= Builth Wells transmitting station =

Sited on high ground to the north of the town of Builth Wells in Powys, South Wales

Builth Wells
- Mast height: 25 metres (82 ft)
- Coordinates: 52°09′56″N 3°24′36″W
- Grid reference: SO036528
- Built: 1980s
- Relay of: Carmel
- BBC region: BBC Wales
- ITV region: ITV Cymru Wales

The Builth Wells television relay station is sited on high ground to the north of the town of Builth Wells in Powys, South Wales. It was originally built in the 1980s as a fill-in relay for UHF analogue colour television. It consists of a 25 m self-supporting lattice mast standing on a hillside which is itself about 230 m above sea level. The transmissions are beamed southwards. The Builth Wells transmission station is owned and operated by Arqiva.

Builth Wells transmitter is classed as an indirect off-air relay of Carmel. It re-radiates a signal received off-air from Llandrindod Wells about 12 km to the north, which itself is a direct off-air relay of Carmel. When it came, the digital switchover process for Builth Wells duplicated the timing at Carmel with the first stage taking place on 26 August 2009 and with the second stage being completed on 23 September 2009. After the switchover process, analogue channels had ceased broadcasting permanently and the Freeview digital TV services were radiated at an ERP of 5 W each.

== Channels listed by frequency ==
=== Analogue television ===
==== 1980s - 26 August 2009 ====
Builth Wells (being in Wales) transmitted the S4C variant of Channel 4.

Frequency	UHF	kW	Service
479.25 MHz	22	0.026	BBC One Wales
503.25 MHz	25	0.026	ITV1 Wales (HTV Wales until 2002)
527.25 MHz	28	0.026	BBC Two Wales
559.25 MHz	32	0.026	S4C

=== Analogue and digital television ===
==== 26 August 2009 - 23 September 2009 ====
The UK's digital switchover commenced at Carmel (and therefore at Builth Wells and all its other relays) on 26 August 2009. Analogue BBC Two Wales on channel 28 was first to close, and ITV Wales was moved from channel 25 to channel 28 for its last month of service. Channel 25 was replaced by the new digital BBC A mux which started up in 64-QAM and at full power (i.e. 5 W).

Frequency	UHF	kW	Service	System
479.25 MHz	22	0.026	BBC One Wales	PAL System I
506.000 MHz	25	0.005	BBC A	DVB-T
527.25 MHz	28	0.026	ITV1 Wales	PAL System I
559.25 MHz	32	0.026	S4C	PAL System I

=== Digital television ===
==== 23 September 2009 - present ====
The remaining analogue TV services were closed down and the digital multiplexes took over on the original analogue channels' frequencies.

Frequency	UHF	kW	Operator
482.000 MHz	22	0.005	Digital 3&4
506.000 MHz	25	0.005	BBC A
530.000 MHz	28	0.005	BBC B
