= Rhayader television relay station =

Television relay station in Wales

Rhayader
- Location within Powys
- Mast height: 45 metres (148 ft)
- Coordinates: 52.320043°N 3.489833°W
- Grid reference: SN985701
- Built: 1977
- Relay of: Carmel
- BBC region: BBC Wales
- ITV region: ITV Cymru Wales

The Rhayader television relay station is sited on high ground to the northeast of the town of Rhayader, south Wales. It was originally built in the 1980s as a fill-in relay for UHF analogue television covering the communities of Rhayader and St. Harmon. It consists of a 45 m self-supporting lattice steel mast standing on a hillside which is itself about 345 m above sea level. The transmissions are beamed southwest and northwest to cover its targets. The Rhayader transmission station is owned and operated by Arqiva.

Rhayader transmitter re-radiates the signal received off-air from Llandrindod Wells which is itself an off-air relay of Carmel about 60 km to the southwest. When it came, the digital switchover process for Rhayader duplicated the timing at Carmel with the first stage taking place on 26 August 2009 and with the second stage being completed on 23 September 2009. After the switchover process, analogue channels had ceased broadcasting permanently and the Freeview digital TV services were radiated at an ERP of 20 W each.

== Channels listed by frequency ==
=== Analogue television ===
==== 8 April 1977 - 1 November 1982 ====
Frequency	UHF	kW	Service
487.25 MHz	23	0.1	HTV Wales
511.25 MHz	26	0.1	BBC Two Wales
567.25 MHz	33	0.1	BBC One Wales

==== 1 November 1982 - 26 August 2009 ====
Being in Wales, Rhayader transmitted the S4C variant of Channel 4.

Frequency	UHF	kW	Service
487.25 MHz	23	0.1	ITV1 Wales (HTV Wales until 2002)
511.25 MHz	26	0.1	BBC Two Wales
535.25 MHz	29	0.1	S4C
567.25 MHz	33	0.1	BBC One Wales

=== Analogue and digital television ===
==== 26 August 2009 - 23 September 2009 ====
The UK's digital switchover commenced at Carmel (and therefore at Rhayader and all its other relays) on 26 August 2009. Analogue BBC Two Wales on channel 26 was first to close, and ITV Wales was moved from channel 23 to channel 26 for its last month of service. Channel 23 was replaced by the new digital BBC A mux which started up in 64-QAM and at full power (i.e. 20 W).

Frequency	UHF	kW	Service	System
490.000 MHz	23	0.02	BBC A	DVB-T
511.25 MHz	26	0.1	ITV1 Wales (HTV Wales until 2002)	PAL System I
535.25 MHz	29	0.1	S4C	PAL System I
567.25 MHz	33	0.1	BBC One Wales	PAL System I

=== Digital television ===
==== 23 September 2009 - present ====
The remaining analogue TV services were closed down and the digital multiplexes took over on the original analogue channels' frequencies.

Frequency	UHF	kW	Operator
490.000 MHz	23	0.02	BBC A
514.000 MHz	26	0.02	BBC B
538.000 MHz	29	0.02	Digital 3&4
