= Abercraf transmitting station =

Television relay station in the upper Swansea Valley

Abercraf
- Mast height: 45 metres (148 ft)
- Coordinates: 51°47′53″N 3°40′01″W
- Grid reference: SN851123
- Built: 1980s
- Relay of: Carmel
- BBC region: BBC Wales
- ITV region: ITV Cymru Wales

The Abercraf television relay station is sited on high ground to the east of the village of Abercraf in the upper Swansea Valley, though it is actually closer to Coelbren than to Abercraf itself. It was originally built in the 1980s as a fill-in relay for UHF analogue colour television covering the communities of Abercraf, Coelbren, Penycae and Ynyswen. It consists of a 45-metre (150 feet) self-supporting lattice mast standing on a hillside which is itself about 270 metres (890 feet) above sea level. The transmissions are beamed southwest and northwest. The Abercraf transmission station is owned and operated by Arqiva.

Abercraf transmitter re-radiates the signal received off-air from Carmel about 12 miles (20 km) to the west. When it came, the digital switchover process for Abercraf duplicated the timing at Carmel with the first stage taking place on 26 August 2009 and with the second stage being completed on 23 September 2009. After the switchover process, analogue channels had ceased broadcasting permanently and the Freeview digital TV services were radiated at an ERP of 18 W each.

== Channels listed by frequency ==
=== Analogue television ===
==== 1980s - 26 August 2009 ====
Abercraf (being in Wales) transmitted the S4C variant of Channel 4.

Frequency	UHF	kW	Service
479.25 MHz	22	0.125	BBC One Wales
503.25 MHz	25	0.125	ITV1 Wales (HTV Wales until 2002)
527.25 MHz	28	0.125	BBC Two Wales
559.25 MHz	32	0.125	S4C

=== Analogue and digital television ===
==== 26 August 2009 - 23 September 2009 ====
The UK's digital switchover commenced at Carmel (and therefore at Abercraf and all its other relays) on 26 August 2009. Analogue BBC Two Wales on channel 28 was first to close, and ITV Wales was moved from channel 25 to channel 28 for its last month of service. Channel 25 was replaced by the new digital BBC A mux which started up in 64-QAM and at full power (i.e. 25 W).

Frequency	UHF	kW	Service	System
479.25 MHz	22	0.125	BBC One Wales	PAL System I
506.000 MHz	25	0.025	BBC A	DVB-T
527.25 MHz	28	0.125	ITV1 Wales	PAL System I
559.25 MHz	32	0.125	S4C	PAL System I

=== Digital television ===
==== 23 September 2009 - present ====
The remaining analogue TV services were closed down and the digital multiplexes took over on the original analogue channels' frequencies.

Frequency	UHF	kW	Operator
482.000 MHz	22	0.025	BBC B
506.000 MHz	25	0.025	BBC A
530.000 MHz	28	0.025	Digital 3&4
