= Efail Fach television relay station =

Efail Fach
- Mast height: 15 metres (49 ft)
- Coordinates: 51°38′54″N 3°45′19″W
- Grid reference: SS786958
- Built: 1980
- Relay of: Kilvey Hill
- BBC region: BBC Wales
- ITV region: ITV Cymru Wales

The Efail Fach television relay station is sited on a hill west of the villages of Efail Fach, Cwm Pelenna and Tonmawr. It was originally built in the 1980 as a fill-in relay for UHF analogue colour television serving all of those settlements. It consists of a 15 m self-supporting lattice mast standing on a hill which is itself about 160 m above sea level. The transmissions are beamed to the east towards the Pelenna valley. The Efail Fach transmission station is owned and operated by Arqiva.

OFCOM claims that the site re-radiates Kilvey Hill directly. Efail Fach does indeed have a clear line-of-sight to Kilvey Hill (which is about 11.6 km away at a bearing of 259.5°).

When it came, the digital switchover process for Efail Fach duplicated the timing at the Kilvey Hill parent station, with the first stage taking place on Wednesday 12 August 2009 and the second stage was completed on Wednesday 9 September 2009, with the Kilvey Hill transmitter-group becoming the first in Wales to complete digital switchover. After the switchover process, analogue channels had ceased broadcasting permanently and the Freeview digital TV services were radiated at an ERP of 2 W each.

== Channels listed by frequency ==
=== Analogue television ===
==== October 1980 - 18 September 1987 ====
Frequency	UHF	kW	Service
615.25 MHz	39	0.008	BBC One Wales
663.25 MHz	45	0.008	BBC Two Wales
695.25 MHz	49	0.008	HTV Wales

==== 18 September 1987 - 12 August 2009 ====
Efail Fach (being in Wales) transmitted the S4C variant of Channel 4, which was one of the last relays to be converted.

Frequency	UHF	kW	Service
615.25 MHz	39	0.008	BBC One Wales
663.25 MHz	45	0.008	BBC Two Wales
695.25 MHz	49	0.008	ITV1 Wales (HTV Wales until 2002)
719.25 MHz	52	0.008	S4C

=== Analogue and digital television ===
==== 12 August 2009 - 9 September 2009 ====
The UK's digital switchover commenced at Kilvey Hill (and therefore at Efail Fach and all its other relays) on 12 August 2009. Analogue BBC Two Wales on channel 45 was first to close, and ITV1 Wales was moved from channel 49 to channel 45 for its last month of service. Channel 49 was replaced by the new digital BBC A mux which started up in 64-QAM and at full power (i.e. 2 W).

Frequency	UHF	kW	Service	System
615.25 MHz	39	0.008	BBC One Wales	PAL System I
663.25 MHz	45	0.008	ITV1 Wales	PAL System I
698.000 MHz	49	0.002	BBC A	DVB-T
719.25 MHz	52	0.008	S4C	PAL System I

=== Digital television ===
==== 9 September 2009 - present ====
The remaining analogue TV services were closed down and the digital multiplexes took over on the original analogue channels' frequencies.

Frequency	UHF	kW	Operator
666.000 MHz	45	0.002	Digital 3&4
698.000 MHz	49	0.002	BBC A
722.000 MHz	52	0.002	BBC B

==== 13 March 2013 ====
As a side-effect of frequency-changes elsewhere in the region to do with clearance of the 800 MHz band for 4G mobile phone use, Efail Fach's "BBC A" multiplex was moved from channel 49 to channel 39.

Frequency	UHF	kW	Operator
618.000 MHz	39	0.002	BBC A
666.000 MHz	45	0.002	Digital 3&4
722.000 MHz	52	0.002	BBC B
