= Machynlleth transmitting station =

Transmitting station in Wales

Machynlleth
- Location within Powys
- Tower height: 30 metres (98 ft)
- Coordinates: 52.586845°N 3.884144°W
- Grid reference: SH724004
- Built: 1965
- Collapsed: BBC Wales ITV Cymru Wales

The Machynlleth transmitting station is a broadcasting and telecommunications facility located on a hill about 2.5 kilometres (1.6 mi) west of the town of Machynlleth, in Powys, Wales. It was originally built by the BBC, entering service in June 1965 acting as a relay transmitter for the now-defunct 405-line VHF television system.

== Specifications ==
The site originally consisted of a pair of 14 metres (46 ft) wooden telegraph poles (one for the transmitting aerials, one for the receiving aerials) erected on land that is itself about 92 metres (302 ft) above sea level. The television broadcasts primarily covered the town of Machynlleth and the villages of the upper Dyfi river valley.

625-line colour TV came to the site in the late 1970s. A new 30 metres (98 ft) self-supporting lattice mast was built to carry the UHF aerials but the original VHF TV and VHF radio services continued to use the site's original wooden poles.

The three original VHF radio transmitters were upgraded to stereo in late Spring 1983.

The 405-line VHF television service closed across the UK in 1985, but Machynlleth's 405 line services closed a year early - in January 1984.

Machynlleth currently broadcasts digital television and analogue FM radio.

== Services listed by frequency ==
=== Analogue television ===
==== 28 June 1965 - Late 1970s ====
The transmitter was classed as a relay of Blaenplwyf about 30 kilometres (19 mi) to the southwest, receiving its signal by direct off-air pickup.

| Frequency | VHF | kW | Service |
|---|---|---|---|
| 66.75 MHz | 5H | 0.05 | BBC1 Wales |

==== Late 1970s - 1 November 1982 ====
Colour TV eventually arrived, with the site continuing to act as an off-air relay of Blaenplwyf for the 625-line services.

| Frequency | VHF | UHF | kW | Service |
|---|---|---|---|---|
| 66.75 MHz | 5H | — | 0.05 | BBC1 Wales |
| 759.25 MHz | — | 57 | 0.02 | BBC1 Wales |
| 783.25 MHz | — | 60 | 0.02 | HTV Wales |
| 807.25 MHz | — | 63 | 0.02 | BBC2 Wales |

==== 1 November 1982 - January 1984 ====
Channel 4 launched across the UK on 1 November 1982. Being in Wales, Machynlleth broadcast the S4C variant.

| Frequency | VHF | UHF | kW | Service |
|---|---|---|---|---|
| 66.75 MHz | 5H | — | 0.05 | BBC1 Wales |
| 727.25 MHz | — | 53 | 0.02 | S4C |
| 759.25 MHz | — | 57 | 0.02 | BBC1 Wales |
| 783.25 MHz | — | 60 | 0.02 | HTV Wales |
| 807.25 MHz | — | 63 | 0.02 | BBC2 Wales |

==== January 1984 - 10 February 2010 ====
405-line television was discontinued after 19 years of service. For the next 25 years there were to be no changes to the television output at this site.

| Frequency | UHF | kW | Service |
|---|---|---|---|
| 727.25 MHz | 53 | 0.02 | S4C |
| 759.25 MHz | 57 | 0.02 | BBC1 Wales |
| 783.25 MHz | 60 | 0.02 | HTV Wales |
| 807.25 MHz | 63 | 0.02 | BBC2 Wales |

=== Analogue and Digital Television ===
==== 10 February 2010 - 10 March 2010 ====
Digital switchover started at Blaenplwyf and therefore at Machynlleth and all its other relays. BBC 2 was closed down on channel 63 and BBC 1 was moved from channel 57 to channel 63 for its final month of service. Mux A started up on the newly vacated channel 57 at full post-DSO power of 4 W.

| Frequency | UHF | kW | Service | System |
|---|---|---|---|---|
| 727.25 MHz | 53 | 0.02 | S4C | PAL System I |
| 762.000 MHz | 57 | 0.004 | BBC A | DVB-T |
| 783.25 MHz | 60 | 0.02 | HTV Wales | PAL System I |
| 807.25 MHz | 63 | 0.02 | BBC1 Wales | PAL System I |

=== Digital Television ===
==== 10 March 2010 - present ====
All the remaining analogue TV transmitters were shut down and the three multiplexes of Freeview Lite took over their frequencies.

| Frequency | UHF | kW | Service |
|---|---|---|---|
| 730.000 MHz | 53 | 0.004 | BBC B |
| 762.000 MHz | 57 | 0.004 | BBC A |
| 786.000 MHz | 60 | 0.004 | Digital 3&4 |

=== Analogue radio (FM VHF) ===
==== 28 June 1965 - Early 1990s ====
For its FM radio services, Machynlleth is an off-air relay of Blaenplwyf.

| Frequency | kW | Service |
|---|---|---|
| 89.4 MHz | 0.06 | BBC Light Programme |
| 91.6 MHz | 0.06 | BBC Third Programme |
| 93.8 MHz | 0.06 | BBC Welsh Home Service |

==== Early 1990s - present ====
Radio 1 gained its own frequency and National Radio 4 was added.

| Frequency | kW | Service |
|---|---|---|
| 89.4 MHz | 0.06 | Radio 2 |
| 91.6 MHz | 0.06 | Radio 3 |
| 93.8 MHz | 0.06 | Radio Cymru |
| 99.0 MHz | 0.06 | Radio 1 |
| 103.6 MHz | 0.06 | Radio 4 |

== See also ==
- List of masts
- List of radio stations in the United Kingdom
- List of tallest buildings and structures in Great Britain
