= Brechfa transmitting station =

Transmitter station in Wales

Brechfa
- Mast height: 12 metres (39 ft)
- Coordinates: 51°56′20″N 4°10′37″W
- Grid reference: SN504289
- Built: 1980s
- Relay of: Carmel
- BBC region: BBC Wales
- ITV region: ITV Cymru Wales

The Brechfa television relay station is sited on high ground to the east of the village of Brechfa to the northeast of Carmarthen. It was originally built in the 1980s as a fill-in relay for UHF analogue colour television covering the communities of Brechfa, Horeb and Aber Goleu. It consists of a 12 m self-supporting lattice steel mast standing on a hillside which is itself about 290 m above sea level. The transmissions are beamed northeast to cover all these targets. The Brechfa transmission station is owned and operated by Arqiva.

Brechfa transmitter re-radiates the signal received off-air from Carmel about 30 km to the south. When it came, the digital switchover process for Brechfa duplicated the timing at Carmel with the first stage taking place on 26 August 2009 and with the second stage being completed on 23 September 2009. After the switchover process, analogue channels had ceased broadcasting permanently and the Freeview digital TV services were radiated at an ERP of 3.6 W each.

== Channels listed by frequency ==
=== Analogue television ===
==== 1980s - 26 August 2009 ====
Brechfa (being in Wales) transmitted the S4C variant of Channel 4.

Frequency	UHF	kW	Service
471.25 MHz	21	0.018	BBC One Wales
495.25 MHz	24	0.018	S4C
519.25 MHz	27	0.018	BBC Two Wales
551.25 MHz	31	0.018	ITV1 Wales (HTV Wales until 2002)

=== Analogue and digital television ===
==== 26 August 2009 - 23 September 2009 ====
The UK's digital switchover commenced at Carmel (and therefore at Brechfa and all its other relays) on 26 August 2009. Analogue BBC Two Wales on channel 27 was first to close, replaced by the new digital BBC A mux which started up in 64-QAM and at full power (i.e. 3.6 W) on that same channel.

Frequency	UHF	kW	Service	System
471.25 MHz	21	0.018	BBC One Wales	PAL System I
495.25 MHz	24	0.018	S4C	PAL System I
522.000 MHz	27	0.0036	BBC A	DVB-T
551.25 MHz	31	0.018	ITV1 Wales (HTV Wales until 2002)	PAL System I

=== Digital television ===
==== 23 September 2009 - present ====
The remaining analogue TV services were closed down and the digital multiplexes took over on the original analogue channels' frequencies.

Frequency	UHF	kW	Operator
474.166 MHz	21+	0.0036	BBC B
498.000 MHz	24	0.0036	Digital 3&4
522.000 MHz	27	0.0036	BBC A
