= Llanwrtyd Wells transmitting station =

Transmitting station in Wales

Llanwrtyd Wells
- Location within Powys
- Mast height: 25 metres (82 ft)
- Coordinates: 52.096411°N 3.607918°W
- Grid reference: SN899454
- Built: 1980s
- Relay of: Carmel
- BBC region: BBC Wales
- ITV region: ITV Cymru Wales

The Llanwrtyd Wells television relay station is sited on high ground by the hamlet of Cefn Gorwydd to the east of the village of Llanwrtyd Wells in Powys, mid Wales. It was originally built in the 1980s as a fill-in relay for UHF analogue television covering the communities of Llanwrtyd Wells, Cefn Gorwydd and the surrounding area. It consists of a 25 m (82 ft) self-supporting lattice steel mast standing on a hillside which is itself about 240 m (790 ft) above sea level. The transmissions are beamed broadly northwest and northeast to cover its targets. The Llanwrtyd Wells transmission station is owned and operated by Arqiva.

Llanwrtyd Wells transmitter re-radiates the signal received off-air from Llandrindod Wells which is itself an off-air relay of Carmel about 45 kilometres (28 mi) to the southwest. When it came, the digital switchover process for Llanwrtyd Wells duplicated the timing at Carmel with the first stage taking place on 26 August 2009 and with the second stage being completed on 23 September 2009. After the switchover process, analogue channels had ceased broadcasting permanently and the Freeview digital TV services were radiated at an ERP of 2 W each.

== Channels listed by frequency ==
=== Analogue television ===
==== 1980's - 26 August 2009 ====
Being in Wales, Llanwrtyd Wells transmitted S4C

Frequency	UHF	kW	Service
471.25 MHz	21	0.010	BBC One Wales
495.25 MHz	24	0.010	ITV1 Wales (HTV Wales until 2002)
519.25 MHz	27	0.010	BBC Two Wales
551.25 MHz	31	0.010	S4C

=== Analogue and digital television ===
==== 26 August 2009 - 23 September 2009 ====
The UK's digital switchover commenced at Carmel (and therefore at Llanwrtyd Wells and all its other relays) on 26 August 2009. Analogue BBC Two Wales on channel 27 was first to close, and ITV Wales was moved from channel 24 to channel 27 for its last month of service. Channel 24 was replaced by the new digital BBC A mux which started up in 64-QAM and at full power (i.e. 2 W).

Frequency	UHF	kW	Service	System
471.25 MHz	21	0.01	BBC One Wales	PAL System I
498.000 MHz	24	0.002	BBC A	DVB-T
519.25 MHz	27	0.01	ITV1 Wales (HTV Wales until 2002)	PAL System I
551.25 MHz	31	0.0	S4C	PAL System I

=== Digital television ===
==== 23 September 2009 - present ====
The remaining analogue TV services were closed down and the digital multiplexes took over on the original analogue channels' frequencies.

Frequency	UHF	kW	Operator
474.166 MHz	21+	0.002	Digital 3&4
498.000 MHz	24	0.002	BBC A
522.000 MHz	27	0.002	BBC B
