= Mynydd Emroch television relay station =

Mynydd Emroch
- Mast height: 25 metres (82 ft)
- Coordinates: 51°35′48″N 3°46′09″W
- Grid reference: SS775901
- Built: 1978
- Relay of: Kilvey Hill
- BBC region: BBC Wales
- ITV region: ITV Cymru Wales

The Mynydd Emroch television relay station is sited on the eponymous hill to the east of Port Talbot. It was originally built in 1978 as a fill-in relay for UHF analogue television. It consists of a 25 metres (82 ft) self-supporting lattice tower standing on a hillside which is itself 600 ft (183 metres) above sea level. The transmitters are beamed southwards to cater for those digital terrestrial TV subscribers in Port Talbot and Margam which for reasons of geography can't get a signal from the Kilvey Hill transmitter across the bay at Swansea. The Mynydd Emroch transmission station is owned and operated by Arqiva.

In the current age of digital television, Mynydd Emroch transmitter re-radiates the signal received off-air from Kilvey Hill about 10 miles (15 km) to the west. However, when it was originally built, the station was considered a relay of Carmel about 25 miles (40 km) to the northwest. When it came, the digital switchover process for Mynydd Emroch duplicated the timing at Kilvey Hill (Mynydd Emroch's new parent station) with the first stage taking place on Wednesday 12 August 2009 and the second stage was completed on Wednesday 9 September 2009, with the Kilvey Hill transmitter-group becoming the first in Wales to complete digital switchover. After the switchover process, analogue channels had ceased broadcasting permanently and the Freeview digital TV services were radiated at an ERP of 18 W each.

== Channels listed by frequency ==
=== Analogue television ===
==== 1980s - 12 August 2009 ====
Mynydd Emroch (being in Wales) transmitted the S4C variant of Channel 4. When it was built, the site was considered a relay of Carmel, but it was silently re-assigned to relay Kilvey Hill's analogue transmissions in February 2009. This was done so that on-screen announcements about the upcoming Digital Switchover at Kilvey Hill would be seen by its subscribers.

Frequency	UHF	kW	Service
623.25 MHz	40	0.09	BBC One Wales
647.25 MHz	43	0.09	ITV1 Wales (HTV Wales until 2002)
671.25 MHz	46	0.09	BBC Two Wales
703.25 MHz	50	0.09	S4C

=== Analogue and digital television ===
==== 12 August 2009 - 9 September 2009 ====
The UK's digital switchover commenced at Kilvey Hill (and therefore at Mynydd Emroch and all its other relays) on 12 August 2009. Analogue BBC Two Wales on channel 46 was first to close, and ITV Wales was moved from channel 43 to channel 46 for its last month of service. Channel 43 was replaced by the new digital BBC A mux which started up in 64-QAM and at full power (i.e. 18 W).

Frequency	UHF	kW	Service	System
623.25 MHz	40	0.09	BBC One Wales	PAL System I
650.000 MHz	43	0.018	BBC A	DVB-T
671.25 MHz	46	0.09	ITV1 Wales	PAL System I
703.25 MHz	50	0.09	S4C	PAL System I

=== Digital television ===
==== 9 September 2009 - 13 march 2013. ====
The remaining analogue TV services were closed down and the digital multiplexes took over on the original analogue channels' frequencies.

Frequency	UHF	kW	Operator
650.000 MHz	43	0.018	BBC A
674.000 MHz	46	0.018	Digital 3&4
706.000 MHz	50	0.018	BBC B

==== 13 March 2013 ====
As a side-effect of frequency-changes elsewhere in the region to do with clearance of the 800 MHz band for 4G mobile phone use, Mynydd Emroch's "BBC B" multiplex will have to be moved from channel 50 to channel 40.

Frequency	UHF	kW	Operator
626.000 MHz	40	0.018	BBC B
650.000 MHz	43	0.018	BBC A
674.000 MHz	46	0.018	Digital 3&4
