= Tenby transmitting station =

Transmitting station in Pembrokeshire, Wales

Tenby
- Location within Pembrokeshire
- Mast height: 17 metres (56 ft)
- Coordinates: 51.661948°N 4.734818°W
- Grid reference: SS109994
- Built: 1978
- Relay of: Carmel
- BBC region: BBC Wales
- ITV region: ITV Cymru Wales

The Tenby television relay station is sited to the southwest of the town of Tenby and north of Penally on the south coast of Pembrokeshire, South Wales. It was built in the 1980s as a fill-in relay for UHF analogue television covering the southwest of Tenby town, plus Penally and the low-lying land between them that is shielded from Carmel (or Wenvoe) by the headland. It consists of a 17 m wooden pole standing on a hillside which is itself about 80 m above sea level. The transmissions are beamed northeast and west to cover the targets. The Tenby station is owned and operated by Arqiva.

Tenby transmitter re-radiates the signal received off-air from Carmel about 30 km to the northeast. The digital switchover process for Tenby duplicated the timing at Carmel, with the first stage taking place on 26 August 2009 and the second stage being completed on 23 September 2009. After the switchover process, analogue channels had ceased broadcasting permanently and the Freeview digital TV services were radiated at an ERP of 20 W each.

== Channels listed by frequency ==
=== Analogue television ===
==== 24 November 1978 - 1 November 1982 ====
Frequency	UHF	kW	Service
615.25 MHz	39	0.031	BBC One Wales
663.25 MHz	45	0.031	BBC Two Wales
695.25 MHz	49	0.031	HTV Wales

==== 1 November 1982 - 26 August 2009 ====
Tenby (being in Wales) transmitted the S4C variant of Channel 4.

Frequency	UHF	kW	Service
615.25 MHz	39	0.031	BBC One Wales
639.25 MHz	42	0.031	S4C
663.25 MHz	45	0.031	BBC Two Wales
695.25 MHz	49	0.031	ITV1 Wales (HTV Wales until 2002)

=== Analogue and digital television ===
==== 26 August 2009 - 23 September 2009 ====
The UK's digital switchover commenced at Carmel (and therefore at Tenby and all its other relays) on 26 August 2009. Analogue BBC Two Wales on channel 45 was first to close, and ITV Wales was moved from channel 49 to channel 45 for its last month of service. A new allocation on channel 56 started up, occupied by the new digital BBC A mux which started up in 64-QAM and at full power (i.e. 20 W).

Frequency	UHF	kW	Service	System
615.25 MHz	39	0.031	BBC One Wales	PAL System I
639.25 MHz	42	0.031	S4C	PAL System I
663.25 MHz	45	0.031	ITV1 Wales (HTV Wales until 2002)	PAL System I
753.833 MHz	56-	0.02	BBC A	DVB-T

=== Digital television ===
==== 23 September 2009 - present ====
The remaining analogue TV services were closed down and the digital multiplexes entered service on completely new frequencies barely overlapping the allocation used in the days of analogue TV. This caused the transmitter to become an "aerial group W" site, whereas it had previously been an "aerial group B" site. Some homes in the area may have required new aerials though the post-DSO ERP of the transmitter is about 5.1 dB greater than is normal on switchover and this should have alleviated much of the problem.

Frequency	UHF	kW	Operator
690.000 MHz	48	0.02	Digital 3&4
721.833 MHz	52-	0.02	BBC B
753.833 MHz	56-	0.02	BBC A
