= Cwmgors transmitting station =

Cwmgors
- Location within Neath Port Talbot
- Mast height: 25 metres (82 ft)
- Coordinates: 51.794775°N 3.878492°W
- Grid reference: SN705123
- Built: 1983
- Relay of: Carmel
- BBC region: BBC Wales
- ITV region: ITV Cymru Wales

The Cwmgors television relay station is sited on high ground at Gwaun Cae Gurwen to the north of the village of Cwmgors in south Wales. It was originally built in 1983 as a fill-in relay for UHF analogue colour television covering the communities of Cwmgors, Gwaun Cae Gurwen and Tairgwaith. It consists of a 25 m self-supporting lattice steel mast standing on a hillside which is itself about 180 m above sea level. The transmissions are beamed broadly south to cover its targets. The Cwmgors transmission station is owned and operated by Arqiva.

Cwmgors transmitter re-radiates the signal received off-air from Carmel about 25 km to the west. When it came, the digital switchover process for Cwmgors duplicated the timing at Carmel with the first stage taking place on 26 August 2009 and with the second stage being completed on 23 September 2009. After the switchover process, analogue channels had ceased broadcasting permanently and the Freeview digital TV services were radiated at an ERP of 5.2 W each.

== Channels listed by frequency ==
=== Analogue television ===
==== Winter 1983 - 26 August 2009 ====
Cwmgors entered service in winter 1983, and (being in Wales) transmitted the S4C variant of Channel 4.

Frequency	UHF	kW	Service
471.25 MHz	21	0.026	BBC One Wales
495.25 MHz	24	0.026	ITV1 Wales (HTV Wales until 2002)
519.25 MHz	27	0.026	BBC Two Wales
551.25 MHz	31	0.026	S4C

=== Analogue and digital television ===
==== 26 August 2009 - 23 September 2009 ====
The UK's digital switchover commenced at Carmel (and therefore at Cwmgors and all its other relays) on 26 August 2009. Analogue BBC Two Wales on channel 27 was first to close, and ITV Wales was moved from channel 24 to channel 27 for its last month of service. Channel 24 was replaced by the new digital BBC A mux which started up in 64-QAM and at full power (i.e. 5.2 W).

Frequency	UHF	kW	Service	System
471.25 MHz	21	0.026	BBC One Wales	PAL System I
498.000 MHz	24	0.0052	BBC A	DVB-T
519.25 MHz	27	0.026	ITV1 Wales (HTV Wales until 2002)	PAL System I
551.25 MHz	31	0.026	S4C	PAL System I

=== Digital television ===
==== 23 September 2009 - present ====
The remaining analogue TV services were closed down and the digital multiplexes took over on the original analogue channels' frequencies.

Frequency	UHF	kW	Operator
474.166 MHz	21+	0.0052	BBC B
498.000 MHz	24	0.0052	BBC A
522.000 MHz	27	0.0052	Digital 3&4
