= Briton Ferry television relay station =

Briton Ferry
- Mast height: 25 metres (82 ft)
- Coordinates: 51°38′45″N 3°48′42″W
- Grid reference: SS747956
- Built: 1979
- Relay of: Kilvey Hill
- BBC region: BBC Wales
- ITV region: ITV Cymru Wales

The Briton Ferry television relay station is sited on a hill to the east of Briton Ferry. It was originally built in the 1970s as a fill-in relay for UHF analogue colour television. It consists of a 25 m self-supporting lattice mast standing on a hillside which is itself about 180 m above sea level (about 150 m above the town). The transmitters are beamed towards the southwest and northwest to cater for those digital terrestrial TV subscribers in Briton Ferry and western Neath which for reasons of geography can't get a signal direct from the Kilvey Hill transmitter at Swansea nor from the relay transmitter at Neath Abbey across the valley. The Briton Ferry transmission station is owned and operated by Arqiva.

Briton Ferry transmitter re-radiates the signal received off-air from Kilvey Hill about 15 km to the west. When it came, the digital switchover process for Briton Ferry duplicated the timing at Kilvey Hill with the first stage taking place on Wednesday 12 August 2009 and the second stage was completed on Wednesday 9 September 2009, with the Kilvey Hill transmitter-group becoming the first in Wales to complete digital switchover. After the switchover process, analogue channels had ceased broadcasting permanently and the Freeview digital TV services were radiated at an ERP of 4 W each.

== Channels listed by frequency ==
=== Analogue television ===
==== 21 September 1979 - 1 November 1982 ====
Frequency	UHF	kW	Service
623.25 MHz	40	0.02	BBC Two Wales
647.25 MHz	43	0.02	HTV Wales
671.25 MHz	46	0.02	BBC One Wales

==== 1 November 1982 - 12 August 2009 ====
Briton Ferry (being in Wales) transmitted the S4C variant of Channel 4.

Frequency	UHF	kW	Service
623.25 MHz	40	0.02	BBC Two Wales
647.25 MHz	43	0.02	HTV Wales
671.25 MHz	46	0.02	BBC One Wales
703.25 MHz	50	0.02	S4C

=== Analogue and digital television ===
==== 12 August 2009 - 9 September 2009 ====
The UK's digital switchover commenced at Kilvey Hill (and therefore at Briton Ferry and all its other relays) on 12 August 2009. Analogue BBC Two Wales on channel 40 was first to close, and ITV Wales was moved from channel 43 to channel 40 for its last month of service. Channel 43 was replaced by the new digital BBC A mux which started up in 64-QAM and at full power (i.e. 4 W).

Frequency	UHF	kW	Service	System
623.25 MHz	40	0.02	ITV1 Wales	PAL System I
650.000 MHz	43	0.004	BBC A	DVB-T
671.25 MHz	46	0.02	BBC One Wales	PAL System I
703.25 MHz	50	0.02	S4C	PAL System I

=== Digital television ===
==== 9 September 2009 - present ====
The remaining analogue TV services were closed down and the digital multiplexes took over on the original analogue channels' frequencies.

Frequency	UHF	kW	Operator
650.000 MHz	43	0.004†	BBC A
674.000 MHz	46	0.004†	Digital 3&4
706.000 MHz	50	0.004†	BBC B

† From 31 October 2012 until 13 March 2013 ERP at this site will increase by +12 dB (i.e. to 32W). The reason for this has not been explained (see talk page).
