= Llanelli transmitting station =

Transmitting station in Wales

Llanelli
- Location within Carmarthenshire
- Mast height: 30 metres (98 ft)
- Coordinates: 51.700072°N 4.156764°W
- Grid reference: SN510023
- Built: 1970
- Relay of: Carmel
- BBC region: BBC Wales
- ITV region: ITV Cymru Wales

The Llanelli transmitting station is a broadcasting and telecommunications facility located on high ground north of the town of Llanelli, South Wales. It was originally built by the BBC, entering service in mid 1970 transmitting the now-defunct 405-line VHF television system. As such, it was one of the last 405 transmitters ever built.

UHF colour television was added to the mast in early 1975.

Currently, the transmitter provides DVB-T digital television to the area, along with Scarlet FM radio and a single multiplex of DAB digital radio.

== Specifications and history ==
The site has a 30 m self-standing lattice mast erected on land that is itself about 100 m above sea level.

UHF television was added to the site in early 1975, launching with just the three programme services that were active at the time. S4C was added in 1982 when it launched.

The 405-line VHF television service closed across the UK in 1985, but according to the BBC's transmitter list and the BBC's internal "Eng. Inf." magazine, Llanelli was due to close early – in the third quarter of 1982.

DAB radio was added in 2010.

== Services listed by frequency ==
=== Analogue television ===
==== 8 June 1970 – Early 1975 ====
BBC 405-line television started up with the site acting as an off-air relay transmitter of Wenvoe about 60 km to the east, near Cardiff..

Frequency	VHF	kW	Service
56.75 MHz	3V	0.015	BBC1 Wales

==== Early 1975 – Third Quarter 1982 ====
When 625-line colour television was added, the site became a relay of Carmel about 15 km to the north.

Frequency	VHF	UHF	kW	Service
56.75 MHz	3V	—	0.015	BBC1 Wales
615.25 MHz	—	39	0.1	BBC1 Wales
663.25 MHz	—	45	0.1	BBC2 Wales
695.25 MHz	—	49	0.1	HTV Wales

==== Third Quarter 1982 – 26 August 2009 ====
405-line television was shut down early compared with the UK as a whole, and Llanelli's Band I transmitter ended its service after a mere 12 years. From then until the start of the digital switchover 27 years later, only UHF television would be available from the site.

Channel 4 was added to the set radiated from the site when it launched on 1 November 1982. Being in Wales, Llanelli transmitted the S4C variant. The channel number chosen for S4C was inconveniently well outside aerial group B which would have been ideal for the other three channels.

Frequency	UHF	kW	Service
615.25 MHz	39	0.1	BBC One Wales
663.25 MHz	45	0.1	BBC Two Wales
695.25 MHz	49	0.1	ITV1 Wales (HTV Wales until 2002)
839.25 MHz	67	0.1	S4C

=== Analogue and digital television ===
==== 26 August 2009 – 23 September 2009 ====
The UK's digital switchover commenced, mirroring the changes taking place at the parent transmitter at Carmel. Analogue BBC Two Wales closed on channel 45 and ITV1 Wales took over on that frequency for what would be its final 3 weeks of service, vacating channel 49 as it did so. The new digital BBC A multiplex started up at full power in 64-QAM mode on channel 49.

Frequency	UHF	kW	Service	System
615.25 MHz	39	0.1	BBC One Wales	PAL System I
663.25 MHz	45	0.1	ITV1 Wales	PAL System I
698.000 MHz	49	0.02	BBC A	DVB-T
839.25 MHz	67	0.1	S4C	PAL System I

=== Digital television ===
==== 23 September 2009 – present ====
All the analogue television services closed and the new digital multiplexes took over on channels 45 and 49. Channel 67 was discontinued, and the BBC B multiplex started on previously unused channel 42. This meant that for the first time since 1982, all the transmissions from the Llanelli transmitter were in aerial group B.

Frequency	UHF	kW	Operator
642.000 MHz	42	0.02	BBC B
666.000 MHz	45	0.02	Digital 3&4
698.000 MHz	49	0.02	BBC A

=== Analogue radio (FM VHF) ===
==== Present ====
Frequency	kW	Service
97.5 MHz	0.2	Radio Carmarthenshire

=== Digital radio (DAB) ===
==== Present ====
Frequency	Block	kW	Operator
225.648 MHz	12B	BBC National DAB	

== See also ==
- List of masts
- List of radio stations in the United Kingdom
- List of tallest buildings and structures in Great Britain
