= Dolgellau transmitting station =

Transmitter in Gwynedd, Wales

Dolgellau
- Location within Gwynedd
- Tower height: 22 metres (72 ft)
- Coordinates: 52.74954°N 3.886713°W
- Grid reference: SH727185
- Built: 1967
- BBC region: BBC Wales (1967-1982)

The Dolgellau transmitting station is a broadcasting and telecommunications facility located on a hill about 1 km north of the town of Dolgellau, in Gwynedd, Wales. It was originally built by the BBC, entering service just before Christmas 1967 acting as a relay transmitter for the now-defunct 405-line VHF television system.

== Specifications ==
The site has a self-standing 22 m lattice tower erected on land that is itself about 100 m above sea level. The television broadcasts primarily cover the towns of Dolgellau, Llanelltyd and the villages of the upper Mawddach river valley.

625-line colour TV came to the site in the late 1970s.

The 405-line VHF television service closed across the UK in 1985, but Dolgellau's 405 line services closed early - in January 1984.

Dolgellau currently broadcasts digital television and analogue FM radio.

== Services listed by frequency ==
=== Analogue television ===
==== 18 December 1967 - Late 1970s ====
The transmitter was classed as a relay of Blaenplwyf about 40 km to the south, but received its signal from an SHF link fed from an off-air pickup on the coast at Barmouth about 10 km away to the west on the Mawddach estuary.

Frequency	VHF	kW	Service
66.75 MHz	5V	0.026	BBC1 Wales

==== November 21st 1977 - 1 November 1982 ====
Colour TV eventually arrived, with the site now additionally acting as an indirect relay of Preseli (about 100 km to the south) for the 625-line services, receiving its signal off-air from Llwyn Onn, which receives its signal off-air from Preseli itself.

Frequency	VHF	UHF	kW	Service
66.75 MHz	5V	—	0.026	BBC1 Wales
743.25 MHz	—	55	0.02	BBC1 Wales
775.25 MHz	—	59	0.02	HTV Wales
799.25 MHz	—	62	0.02	BBC2 Wales

==== 1 November 1982 - January 1984 ====
Channel 4 launched across the UK on 1 November 1982. Being in Wales, Dolgellau broadcast the S4C variant.

Frequency	VHF	UHF	kW	Service
66.75 MHz	5V	—	0.026	BBC1 Wales
743.25 MHz	—	55	0.02	BBC1 Wales
775.25 MHz	—	59	0.02	HTV Wales
799.25 MHz	—	62	0.02	BBC2 Wales
823.25 MHz	—	65	0.02	S4C

==== January 1984 - 19 August 2009 ====
405-line television was discontinued (after a mere 17 years). For the next 25 years there were to be no changes to the television output at this site.

Frequency	UHF	kW	Service
743.25 MHz	55	0.02	BBC1 Wales
775.25 MHz	59	0.02	ITV Wales & WestHTV Wales
799.25 MHz	62	0.02	BBC2 Wales
823.25 MHz	65	0.02	S4C

=== Analogue and Digital Television ===
==== 19 August 2009 - 16 September 2009 ====
Digital switchover started at Preseli and therefore at Dolgellau and all its other relays. BBC 2 was closed down on channel 62 and ITV 1 was moved from channel 59 to channel 62 for its final three weeks of service. Mux A started up on the newly vacated channel 59 at full post-DSO power.

Frequency	UHF	kW	Service	System
743.25 MHz	55	0.02	BBC1 Wales	PAL System I
778.000 MHz	59	0.004	BBC A	DVB-T
799.25 MHz	62	0.02	ITV1 Wales	PAL System I
823.25 MHz	65	0.02	S4C	PAL System I

=== Digital Television ===
==== 16 September 2009 - 31 October 2012 ====
All the remaining analogue TV transmitters were shut down and the three multiplexes of Freeview Lite took over their frequencies.

Frequency	UHF	kW	Service
746.000 MHz	55	0.004	Digital 3&4
778.000 MHz	59	0.004	BBC A
801.833 MHz	62-	0.004	BBC B

==== 31 October 2012 - present ====
As part of the Europe-wide clearance of the 800 MHz band, the BBC Mux B signal was moved from channel 62- to channel 50.

Frequency	UHF	kW	Service
706.000 MHz	50	0.004	BBC B
746.000 MHz	55	0.004	Digital 3&4
778.000 MHz	59	0.004	BBC A

=== Analogue radio (FM VHF) ===
==== 18 December 1967 - Early 1990s ====
For its FM radio services, Dolgellau is an off-air relay of Blaenplwyf.

Frequency	kW	Service
90.1 MHz	0.016	Radio 2
92.3 MHz	0.016	Radio 3
94.5 MHz	0.016	Radio 4 Wales

==== Early 1990s - present ====
Radio 1 gained its own frequency and National Radio 4 was added.

Frequency	kW	Service
90.1 MHz	0.02	Radio 2
92.3 MHz	0.02	Radio 3
94.5 MHz	0.02	Radio Cymru
99.7 MHz	0.02	Radio 1
103.6 MHz	0.02	Radio 4

== See also ==
- List of masts
- List of radio stations in the United Kingdom
- List of tallest buildings and structures in Great Britain
