= Caerhendy transmitting station =

Caerhendy
- Location within Neath Port Talbot
- Mast height: 10 metres (33 ft)
- Coordinates: 51.606292°N 3.773067°W
- Grid reference: SS772912
- Built: 1980s
- Demolished: 2010
- Relay of: Wenvoe
- BBC region: BBC Wales
- ITV region: ITV Cymru Wales

The Caerhendy television relay station was sited at Caerhendy in the Afan Valley, a few kilometres north of Junction 40 on the M4 motorway at Port Talbot. It was originally built in the 1980s as a fill-in relay for UHF analogue television. It was sited at the clubhouse of the football ground at Ynys Park and consisted of a mere 3 m aluminium mast carrying a vertically stacked yagi array. The transmitter served roughly 50 houses in Caerhendy, about 500 m across the valley to the east, which was unable to receive a signal from Mynydd Emroch transmitter just to the south.

Alltwen transmitter re-radiated a signal received off-air from Cwmafan about 2 km further to the northeast, itself a relay of Wenvoe. It was possibly the lowest ERP officially provided TV relay in the UK, radiating just 0.5 W on each of its four UHF channels.

When it arrived, the digital switchover process rendered Caerhendy redundant. It is no longer in service.

== Channels listed by frequency ==
=== Analogue television ===
==== 1980s - March 2010 ====
Frequency	UHF	kW	Service
471.25 MHz	21	0.0005	BBC One Wales
495.25 MHz	24	0.0005	ITV1 Wales
519.25 MHz	27	0.0005	BBC Two Wales
551.25 MHz	31	0.0005	S4C
