= Cilycwm transmitting station =

Cilycwm
- Mast height: 17 metres (56 ft)
- Coordinates: 52°03′03″N 3°47′03″W
- Grid reference: SN777406
- Built: 1987
- Relay of: Carmel
- BBC region: BBC Wales
- ITV region: ITV Cymru Wales

The Cilycwm television relay station is sited on high ground to the east of the village of Cilycwm to the north of Llandovery in Carmarthenshire, South Wales. It was originally built in 1987 as a fill-in relay for UHF analogue colour television covering the communities of Cilycwm and Rhandirmwyn. It consists of a 17 m self-standing lattice steel mast standing on a hillside which is itself about 190 m above sea level. The transmissions are broadly beamed west and east (through north) to cover the targets. The Cilycwm transmission station is owned and operated by NTL.

Cilycwm transmitter re-radiates the signal received off-air from Carmel about 40 km to the southwest. When it came, the digital switchover process for Cilycwm duplicated the timing at Carmel with the first stage taking place on 26 August 2009 and with the second stage being completed on 23 September 2009. After the switchover process, analogue channels had ceased broadcasting permanently and the Freeview digital TV services were radiated at an ERP of 2 W each.

== Channels listed by frequency ==
=== Analogue television ===
==== Spring 1987 - 26 August 2009 ====
Cilycwm entered service in spring 1987, and (being in Wales) transmitted the S4C variant of Channel 4.

Frequency	UHF	kW	Service
471.25 MHz	21	0.007	BBC One Wales
495.25 MHz	24	0.007	S4C
519.25 MHz	27	0.007	BBC Two Wales
551.25 MHz	31	0.007	ITV1 Wales (HTV Wales until 2002)

=== Analogue and digital television ===
==== 26 August 2009 - 23 September 2009 ====
The UK's digital switchover commenced at Carmel (and therefore at Cilycwm and all its other relays) on 26 August 2009. Analogue BBC Two Wales on channel 27 was first to close, replaced by the new digital BBC A mux which started up in 64-QAM and at full power (i.e. 2 W) on that same channel.

Frequency	UHF	kW	Service	System
471.25 MHz	21	0.007	BBC One Wales	PAL System I
495.25 MHz	24	0.007	S4C	PAL System I
522.000 MHz	27	0.002	BBC A	DVB-T
551.25 MHz	31	0.007	ITV1 Wales (HTV Wales until 2002)	PAL System I

=== Digital television ===
==== 23 September 2009 - present ====
The remaining analogue TV services were closed down and the digital multiplexes took over on the original analogue channels' frequencies.

Frequency	UHF	kW	Operator
474.166 MHz	21+	0.002	BBC B
498.000 MHz	24	0.002	Digital 3&4
522.000 MHz	27	0.002	BBC A
