= Llandrindod Wells transmitting station =

Broadcasting and telecommunications facility l

Llandrindod Wells
- Location within Powys
- Mast height: 75 metres (246 ft)
- Coordinates: 52.260429°N 3.43948°W
- Grid reference: SO018634
- Built: 1961
- Relay of: Carmel
- BBC region: BBC Wales
- ITV region: ITV Cymru Wales

The Llandrindod Wells transmitting station is a broadcasting and telecommunications facility located on high ground about midway between Llandrindod Wells and Rhayader, in Powys, Wales. It was originally built by the BBC, entering service in 1961 transmitting the now-defunct 405-line VHF television system and the original three FM radio services.

Currently, the transmitter provides DVB-T digital television to the area, along with FM radio and a single multiplex of DAB digital radio.

== Specifications and history ==
Originally, the site had a guyed 65 m lattice mast erected on land that is itself about 440 m above sea level. Unusually for the era, when 405-line Independent Television came to the area in 1969, the ITV transmissions were hosted on the same mast as the BBC ones.

UHF television was added to the site in late 1975, launching with just the three programme services that were active at the time. S4C was added in 1982 when it launched.

405-line television from this site was shut down in January 1985.

In 1991, the site was re-engineered. A self-standing 75 m lattice mast was erected on the site, the services were transferred from the old mast on 13 November 1991. The television broadcasts primarily cover the towns of Llandrindod Wells (to the east), Builth Wells (to the southeast) and Rhayader (to the northwest).

On 23 September 2009 all the analogue television transmissions from the station were switched off and replaced by 3 digital television signals carrying the basic Freeview (UK) television service. The digital service used the higher three channels previously used by the analogue services (42,45 and 49). In 2014 the UK telecommunications regulatory Ofcom decided that the 700 MHz band should be cleared of digital television to be used for mobile broadband services by the summer of 2020. In anticipation of this decision, on 22 May 2013 the BBC A frequency was changed from channel 49 to channel 39.

== Services listed by frequency ==
=== Analogue television ===
==== 4 December 1961 - 1964 ====
BBC 405-line television started up with the site acting as an off-air relay transmitter of Wenvoe about 90 km to the south, near Cardiff. About 42 km south there is the 700 m ridge to the east of Pen y Fan which obstructs the line-of-sight, but the off-air signal was good enough, as evidenced by the BBC's 1963 report on long-distance rebroadcast links (see map on page 8).

Frequency	VHF	kW	Service
45.00 MHz	1	1.5	BBC TV

==== 1964 - 4 July 1969 ====
BBC Wales launched from Wenvoe on 9 February 1964 on channel 13, and the off-air repeaters of Wenvoe (within Wales) were reconfigured to use this signal.

Frequency	VHF	kW	Service
45.00 MHz	1	1.5	BBC Wales

==== 4 July 1969 - Late 1975 ====
When ITV 405-line television commenced, the site additionally became an indirect off-air relay of Preseli about 90 km to the west. Available documentation does not state how the signal from Preseli was routed to Llandrindod Wells. There is a 30 km long stretch of high ground (the southern Cambrian hills) obstructing the direct signal from Preseli starting about 10 km to the west. However, the 100 W off-air relay at Llandovery is line-of-sight about 30 km away on a bearing of 218°.

Llandovery relay had been built a year earlier in 1968, and as can be deduced from the geometry of MB21's photos, it was indeed chosen for the signal source. Eight yagi aerials (four in use, four as reserves) were needed to pick up a reliable signal off-air.

Frequency	VHF	kW	Service
45.00 MHz	1	1.5	BBC1 Wales
194.75 MHz	9	3	HTV Wales

==== Late 1975 - 1 November 1982 ====
When 625-line colour television was added, the site additionally became a relay of Carmel about 65 km to the southwest. This despite the fact that line-of-sight is obstructed about 24 km to the southwest by the slopes of Esgair Dafydd just north of the Sugar Loaf.

Frequency	VHF	UHF	kW	Service
45.00 MHz	1	—	1.5	BBC1 Wales
194.75 MHz	9	—	3	HTV Wales
615.25 MHz	—	39	2.25	BBC1 Wales
663.25 MHz	—	45	2.25	BBC2 Wales
695.25 MHz	—	49	2.25	HTV Wales

==== 1 November 1982 – 3 January 1985 ====
Channel 4 was added to the set radiated from the site when it launched in November 1982. Being in Wales, Llandrindod Wells radiated the S4C variant.

Frequency	VHF	UHF	kW	Service
45.00 MHz	1	—	1.5	BBC1 Wales
194.75 MHz	9	—	3	HTV Wales
615.25 MHz	—	39	2.25	BBC1 Wales
639.25 MHz	—	42	2.25	S4C
663.25 MHz	—	45	2.25	BBC2 Wales
695.25 MHz	—	49	2.25	HTV Wales

==== 3 January 1985 – 26 August 2009 ====
405-line television was shut down across the UK and Llandrindod Wells' Band I and Band III transmitters ended their service after 24 years and 16 years respectively. From then until the start of the digital switchover 24 years later, only UHF television would be available from the site.

Frequency	UHF	kW	Service
615.25 MHz	39	2.25	BBC One Wales
639.25 MHz	42	2.25	S4C
663.25 MHz	45	2.25	BBC Two Wales
695.25 MHz	49	2.25	ITV1 Wales (HTV Wales until 2002)

=== Analogue and digital television ===
==== 26 August 2009 – 23 September 2009 ====
The UK's digital switchover commenced, mirroring the changes taking place at the parent transmitter at Carmel. Analogue BBC Two Wales closed on channel 45 and ITV1 Wales took over on that frequency for what would be its final 3 weeks of service, vacating channel 49 as it did so. The new digital BBC A multiplex started up at full power in 64-QAM mode on channel 49.

Frequency	UHF	kW	Service	System
615.25 MHz	39	2.25	BBC One Wales	PAL System I
639.25 MHz	42	2.25	S4C	PAL System I
663.25 MHz	45	2.25	ITV1 Wales	PAL System I
698.000 MHz	49	0.4	BBC A	DVB-T

=== Digital television ===
==== 23 September 2009 – 22 May 2013 ====
Frequency	UHF	kW	Operator
642.000 MHz	42	0.4	Digital 3&4
666.000 MHz	45	0.4	BBC B
698.000 MHz	49	0.4	BBC A

==== 22 May 2013 – Present ====
Frequency	UHF	kW	Operator
618.000 MHz	39	0.4	BBC A
642.000 MHz	42	0.4	Digital 3&4
666.000 MHz	45	0.4	BBC B

=== Analogue radio (FM VHF) ===
==== 4 December 1961 - Circa 1990 ====
From the outset, Llandrindod Wells radiated the BBC's three FM radio services, acting as an off-air relay of Wenvoe.

Frequency	kW	Service
89.1 MHz	1	BBC Light Programme
91.3 MHz	1	BBC Third Programme
93.5 MHz	1	BBC Welsh Home Service

==== Present ====
Radio 2, Radio 3 and Radio Cymru still use the original frequencies that have been used since 1961. Radio 1 and Radio 4 commenced transmission from this site on 13 November 1991. Radio 4, along with Radio Cymru, have replaced the Welsh Home Service (later known as Radio Wales).

Frequency	kW	Service
89.1 MHz	1.4	BBC Radio 2
91.3 MHz	1.4	BBC Radio 3
93.5 MHz	1.4	BBC Radio Cymru
98.7 MHz	1.4	BBC Radio 1
103.8 MHz	1.4	BBC Radio 4

=== Digital radio (DAB) ===
==== Present ====
Frequency	Block	kW	Operator
225.648 MHz	12B	5	BBC National DAB

== See also ==
- List of masts
- List of radio stations in the United Kingdom
- List of tallest buildings and structures in Great Britain
