= Llandovery transmitting station =

Transmitting station in Wales

Llandovery
- Location within Carmarthenshire
- Mast height: 40 metres (131 ft)
- Coordinates: 52.050981°N 3.705458°W
- Grid reference: SN831405
- Built: 1968
- Relay of: Preseli
- ITV region: ITV Wales

The Llandovery transmitting station is a telecommunications facility located to the north of Llandovery and east of Cynghordy, in Carmarthenshire, Wales. It has a self-supporting 40 m lattice mast erected on land that is itself about 312 m above sea level. The site was originally built by the IBA, entering service in 1968 transmitting the now-defunct 405-line VHF television system. As well as providing an ITV service to the town of Llandovery some 8 km to the south west the site also transmitted to the north east, primarily to provide a link-signal for the ITV transmitter at Llandrindod Wells. The north easterly transmission also provided the ITV service to the villages of Llanwrtyd Wells and Llangammarch Wells.

When UHF 625-line colour TV came to mid Wales in the 1970s the Llandovery locality was covered by the main transmitter at Carmel and so this site was not needed as a repeater. The villages of Llanwrtyd Wells and Llangammarch Wells were subsequently covered by a UHF relay station at Llanwrtyd Wells which came into service in the early 1980s. The nearest UHF relay to the Llandovery site is at Cilycwm 5.4 km to the west.

405-line television from Llandovery was shut down in January 1985.

== Services listed by frequency ==
=== Analogue television ===
==== 30 August 1968 - 3 January 1985 ====
ITV 405-line television started up with the site acting as an off-air relay transmitter of Preseli about 65 km to the west.

Frequency	VHF	kW	Service
204.75 MHz	11H	0.1	ITV Wales

==== 3 January 1985 - present ====
405-line television was shut down across the UK in 1985 and Llandovery's Band III transmitter ended its service after a mere 17 years. From then onwards the site has been used as a telecommunications relay only.

== See also ==
- List of masts
- List of tallest buildings and structures in Great Britain
