= Blaenplwyf transmitting station =

Telecommunication tower

Blaenplwyf
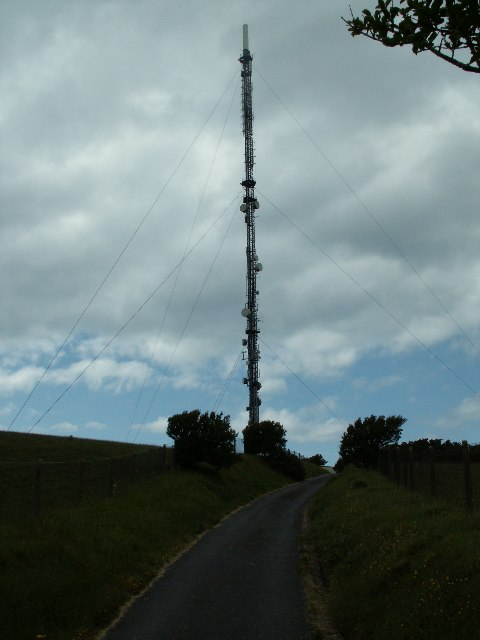

- Location within Ceredigion
- Mast height: 152 metres (499 ft)
- Coordinates: 52.36°N 4.101944°W
- BBC region: BBC Wales
- ITV region: ITV Cymru Wales

The Blaenplwyf transmitting station (sometimes written "Blaen Plwyf" or "Blaen-Plwyf") is a broadcasting and telecommunications facility located near the village of Blaenplwyf about 10 kilometres (6 mi) to the south west of the town of Aberystwyth, in Ceredigion, Wales (grid reference SN569756). It was originally built by the BBC, entering service in October 1956 acting as a main transmitter for BBC Band II VHF FM radio.

It had been planned that the BBC's 405-line VHF television service would commence on the same date, but delays at Rowridge caused the official switch-on to happen six months later on 29 April 1957. Blaenplwyf was considered a main transmitter for VHF television (despite radiating only 3 kW ERP) as it was fed from a microwave link from Mynydd Pencarreg just south of Lampeter.

The facility is now owned and operated by Arqiva.

The site has a 152 metres (499 ft) guyed steel lattice mast standing on land that is itself 175 metres (574 ft) above sea level. The television and radio broadcasts were originally designed to cover the majority of the Cardigan Bay coastline, the antennas being designed for maximum ERP to the north and to the south-west.

Blaenplwyf became a main transmitter for UHF analogue colour television from 1970 onwards, and was transmitting all three original UHF channels in colour from mid 1973.

It currently carries all six UK digital television multiplexes.

== Services listed by frequency ==
=== Analogue television ===
==== 29 April 1957 – Summer 1970 ====
Newspaper articles claimed that at launch, the television service would be 1 kW. The technical report from the BBC disagrees, pointing out that the mean ERP was 0.8 kW at launch, and was uprated to twice that value on 8 August 1958.

This report also points out that the signal had its maximum ERP lobe to the north, and that this had been 1.6 kW at launch and 3.2 kW after the power increase. Also, that the coastal towns to the south-west had been treated to the weakest ERP (0.5 kW at launch, 1.0 kW later). Amongst the effects of this were to leave the town of Cardigan with no signal.

| Frequency | VHF | kW | Service |
|---|---|---|---|
| 56.75 MHz | 3 | 1.6 (3.2 from August 1958) | BBC Television |

==== Summer 1970 – 7 May 1973 ====
BBC2 625-line UHF colour television services came to Blaenplwyf in 1970 (early for Wales). VHF television continued as before. The service area for UHF however was designed to cover more of inland mid Wales than the VHF service had been.

| Frequency | VHF | UHF | kW | Service |
|---|---|---|---|---|
| 56.75 MHz | 3 | — | 3 | BBC1 Wales |
| 519.25 MHz | — | 27 | 100 | BBC2 Wales |

==== 7 May 1973 – 1 November 1982 ====
A full (3-channel) 625-line UHF colour television service was in operation from Blaenplwyf as of 1973 with the introduction of the HTV Wales service.

| Frequency | VHF | UHF | kW | Service |
|---|---|---|---|---|
| 56.75 MHz | 3 | — | 3 | BBC1 Wales |
| 495.25 MHz | — | 24 | 100 | HTV Wales |
| 519.25 MHz | — | 27 | 100 | BBC2 Wales |
| 551.25 MHz | — | 31 | 100 | BBC1 Wales |

==== 1 November 1982 – January 1985 ====
The launch of Channel 4 (S4C in Wales) took the UHF capabilities of the site to its design maximum. Being in Wales, this transmitter radiated the S4C variant.

| Frequency | VHF | UHF | kW | Service |
|---|---|---|---|---|
| 56.75 MHz | 3 | — | 3 | BBC1 Wales |
| 471.25 MHz | — | 21 | 100 | S4C |
| 495.25 MHz | — | 24 | 100 | HTV Wales |
| 519.25 MHz | — | 27 | 100 | BBC2 Wales |
| 551.25 MHz | — | 31 | 100 | BBC1 Wales |

==== January 1985 – 30 March 1997 ====
28 years of VHF television from this site came to an end in 1985 as the entire 405-line VHF TV system was switched off across the UK. Blaenplwyf continued with its four UHF channels.

| Frequency | UHF | kW | Service |
|---|---|---|---|
| 471.25 MHz | 21 | 100 | S4C |
| 495.25 MHz | 24 | 100 | HTV Wales |
| 519.25 MHz | 27 | 100 | BBC2 Wales |
| 551.25 MHz | 31 | 100 | BBC1 Wales |

==== 30 March 1997 – 15 November 1998 ====
Despite the fact that the UK's UHF TV system had only been engineered for four TV channels, a fifth was added in 1997. In common with the situation across much of the UK, Blaenplwyf was forced to transmit this extra service well out-of-group and at low power compared with the main four.

| Frequency | UHF | kW | Service |
|---|---|---|---|
| 471.25 MHz | 21 | 100 | S4C |
| 495.25 MHz | 24 | 100 | HTV Wales |
| 519.25 MHz | 27 | 100 | BBC2 Wales |
| 551.25 MHz | 31 | 100 | BBC1 Wales |
| 751.25 MHz | 56 | 4 | Channel 5 |

=== Analogue and digital television ===
==== 15 November 1998 – 10 February 2010 ====
The UK's initial experimental digital television service was rolled out, using low power for the transmissions and interleaved with the analogue transmissions in an attempt to make the whole set receivable with the original aerial group.

| Frequency | UHF | kW | Service | System |
|---|---|---|---|---|
| 471.25 MHz | 21 | 100 | S4C | PAL System I |
| 482.166 MHz | 22+ | 2 | Digital 3&4 (Mux 2) | DVB-T |
| 495.25 MHz | 24 | 100 | HTV Wales | PAL System I |
| 506.166 MHz | 25+ | 2 | SDN (Mux A) | DVB-T |
| 519.25 MHz | 27 | 100 | BBC2 Wales | PAL System I |
| 530.166 MHz | 28+ | 2 | BBC (Mux 1) | DVB-T |
| 538.166 MHz | 29+ | 1 | Arqiva (Mux C) | DVB-T |
| 551.25 MHz | 31 | 100 | BBC1 Wales | PAL System I |
| 562.166 MHz | 32+ | 2 | BBC (Mux B) | DVB-T |
| 570.166 MHz | 33+ | 1 | Arqiva (Mux D) | DVB-T |
| 751.25 MHz | 56 | 4 | Channel 5 | PAL System I |

==== 10 February 2010 – 10 March 2010 ====
Digital Switchover started at Blaenplwyf. The BBC2 analogue service on channel 27 was closed down after 40 years of service. Multiplex 1 from channel 28+ was also closed and the new BBC multiplex A commenced on channel 27 at its intended full power and using 64-QAM mode and 8k carriers from the start.

| Frequency | UHF | kW | Service | System |
|---|---|---|---|---|
| 471.25 MHz | 21 | 100 | S4C | PAL System I |
| 482.166 MHz | 22+ | 2 | Digital 3&4 (Mux 2) | DVB-T |
| 495.25 MHz | 24 | 100 | HTV Wales | PAL System I |
| 506.166 MHz | 25+ | 2 | SDN (Mux A) | DVB-T |
| 522.000 MHz | 27 | 40 | BBC A | DVB-T |
| 538.166 MHz | 29+ | 1 | Arqiva (Mux C) | DVB-T |
| 551.25 MHz | 31 | 100 | BBC1 Wales | PAL System I |
| 562.166 MHz | 32+ | 2 | BBC (Mux B) | DVB-T |
| 570.166 MHz | 33+ | 1 | Arqiva (Mux D) | DVB-T |
| 751.25 MHz | 56 | 4 | Channel 5 | PAL System I |

=== Digital television ===
==== 10 March 2010 – present ====
Digital switchover was completed, seeing the shutdown of all the remaining analogue TV services from this site. The new digital multiplexes took over the frequencies of the analogue services plus a few new ones.

| Frequency | UHF | kW | Operator |
|---|---|---|---|
| 474.166 MHz | 21+ | 40 | BBC B |
| 482.166 MHz | 22+ | 10 | Arqiva A |
| 498.000 MHz | 24 | 40 | Digital 3&4 |
| 506.000 MHz | 25 | 10 | SDN |
| 522.000 MHz | 27 | 40 | BBC A |
| 530.000 MHz | 28 | 10 | Arqiva B |

=== Analogue radio (FM VHF) ===
==== 14 October 1956 – August 1968 ====
Blaenplwyf started transmitting VHF FM radio only a year and a half after the then-novel service was initiated in the UK. At launch, the service was from temporary transmitters using a temporary mast, but from 29 April 1957 the main transmitters came into service with antennas on the main mast. These transmitters were 60 kW each.

In 1960 the BBC published a technical report showing the measured service area of the FM radio services (plus those of Moel y Parc and Llanddona).

| Frequency | kW | Service |
|---|---|---|
| 88.7 MHz | 60 | BBC Light Programme |
| 90.9 MHz | 60 | Third Programme |
| 93.1 MHz | 60 | Welsh Home Service |

==== August 1968 – May 1978 ====
The names of the radio services changed in the late 1960s, but the number of services available remained the same, as did the ERPs.

| Frequency | kW | Service |
|---|---|---|
| 88.7 MHz | 60 | BBC Radio 2 |
| 90.9 MHz | 60 | BBC Radio 3 |
| 93.1 MHz | 60 | BBC Radio 4 Wales |

==== May 1978 – Late 1980s ====
Radio 1 started to share the Radio 2 VHF allocations during the late 1970s. Radio Cymru had taken over the 93.1 MHz slot. The ERPs of all three services were still unchanged.

| Frequency | kW | Service |
|---|---|---|
| 88.7 MHz | 60 | BBC Radio 1/BBC Radio 2 |
| 90.9 MHz | 60 | BBC Radio 3 |
| 93.1 MHz | 60 | Radio Cymru |

==== Late 1980s ====
The ERP had been uprated in the years since 1978. More services had been added with BBC Radio 1's FM transmissions starting on 19 December 1989.

| Frequency | kW | Service |
|---|---|---|
| 88.7 MHz | 250 | BBC Radio 2 |
| 90.9 MHz | 250 | BBC Radio 3 |
| 93.1 MHz | 250 | BBC Radio Cymru |
| 98.3 MHz | 250 | BBC Radio 1 |
| 104.0 MHz | 250 | BBC Radio 4 |

==== January 2012-present ====
More services have been added since the late 1980s. The latter of these references notes that the Classic FM and Radio Ceredigion services are radiated from a point only 80 m (262 ft) up the mast, and together with the low ERPs of those two services, the coverage should be expected to be limited.

From 4 January 2011, Real Radio was added to the set. Real Radio's OFCOM application claims they intended to radiate 10 kW and 2.5 kW beams. Real Radio was replaced with Heart in 2014, and Radio Ceredigion was replaced with Nation Radio in 2019.

| Frequency | kW | Service |
|---|---|---|
| 88.7 MHz | 250 | BBC Radio 2 |
| 90.9 MHz | 250 | BBC Radio 3 |
| 93.1 MHz | 250 | BBC Radio Cymru |
| 95.3 MHz | 120 | BBC Radio Wales |
| 98.3 MHz | 250 | BBC Radio 1 |
| 101.1 MHz | 10 | Classic FM |
| 104.0 MHz | 250 | BBC Radio 4 |
| 107.7 MHz | 10 | Heart North and Mid Wales |

== See also ==
- List of masts
- List of radio stations in the United Kingdom
- List of tallest buildings and structures in Great Britain
