= Kilvey Hill transmitting station =

Transmitter in Swansea, Wales

Kilvey Hill
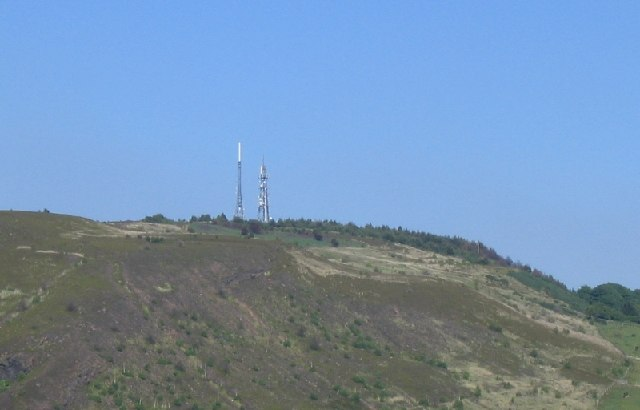

- Location in the City and County of Swansea
- Tower height: 45 metres (148 ft)
- Coordinates: 51.629167°N 3.920278°W
- Grid reference: SS672940
- Built: 1967
- BBC region: BBC Wales
- ITV region: ITV Cymru Wales

The Kilvey Hill transmitting station was originally built at the summit of Kilvey Hill in Swansea, Wales, by the BBC in 1967 as a relay for VHF and UHF television. VHF television came on air a few months before the UHF services. As built, the station did not radiate VHF FM radio, this was added later. Currently, the hill's transmitters cater for viewers and FM radio listeners in Swansea, Neath Port Talbot and South Carmarthenshire, while the digital radio signal covers the rest of Carmarthenshire and other parts of South Wales including Cowbridge and the Vale of Glamorgan where the Wenvoe Transmitters’ signals are shielded by hills. The station is owned and operated by Arqiva.

Freeview digital terrestrial TV was already available at low power from this transmitter before the digital switchover process began, with the first stage taking place on Wednesday 12 August 2009. The second stage was completed on Wednesday 9 September 2009, with the transmitter becoming the first in Wales to complete digital switchover. After the switchover process, analogue channels ceased broadcasting permanently and the Freeview power increased from 383 W ERP to 2 kW ERP, a 7 dB power increase.

== Channels listed by frequency ==
=== Analogue television ===
==== December 1967 - 17 February 1968 ====
Kilvey Hill provided BBC 405-line VHF television to the Neath and Port Talbot area which is strongly shielded by local hills from the Wenvoe transmitter just to the west of Cardiff. Kilvey Hill was a relay of the Wenvoe transmitter. Despite being sited at Swansea, no effort was made to provide the VHF TV signal to Swansea itself - the town was already deemed to be well served by Wenvoe.

| Frequency | VHF | kW | Service |
|---|---|---|---|
| 51.75 MHz | 2 | 0.5 | BBC1 Wales |

==== 17 February 1968 - 28 January 1972 ====
A BBC R&D report details the coming of 625-line UHF television to the Kilvey Hill site. This again was with the station acting as an off-air relay of Wenvoe, which was (at that point) only transmitting BBC 2 (in colour) on 625-lines. This time, the northern parts of Swansea were intended to be covered by the signal as local hills (including Kilvey Hill itself) shielded those parts of the town from the UHF signal from Wenvoe.

| Frequency | VHF | UHF | kW | Service |
|---|---|---|---|---|
| 51.75 MHz | 2 | — | 0.5 | BBC1 Wales |
| 511.25 MHz | — | 26 | 10 | BBC2 Wales |

==== 28 January 1972 - 1 November 1982 ====
BBC1 and HTV Wales came on air from Wenvoe in April 1970, but it was nearly two years later before Kilvey Hill started to relay those channels.

| Frequency | VHF | UHF | kW | Service |
|---|---|---|---|---|
| 51.75 MHz | 2 | — | 0.5 | BBC1 Wales |
| 487.25 MHz | — | 23 | 10 | HTV Wales |
| 511.25 MHz | — | 26 | 10 | BBC2 Wales |
| 567.25 MHz | — | 33 | 10 | BBC1 Wales |

==== 1 November 1982 - Second Quarter 1983 ====
Channel 4 launched across the UK in 1982. Kilvey Hill (being in Wales) transmitted the S4C variant.

| Frequency | VHF | UHF | kW | Service |
|---|---|---|---|---|
| 51.75 MHz | 2 | — | 0.5 | BBC1 Wales |
| 487.25 MHz | — | 23 | 10 | HTV Wales |
| 511.25 MHz | — | 26 | 10 | BBC2 Wales |
| 535.25 MHz | — | 29 | 10 | S4C |
| 567.25 MHz | — | 33 | 10 | BBC1 Wales |

==== Second Quarter 1983 - 15 July 1997 ====
405 line television was discontinued early, and from then onwards TV transmissions were on UHF only.

| Frequency | UHF | kW | Service |
|---|---|---|---|
| 487.25 MHz | 23 | 10 | HTV Wales |
| 511.25 MHz | 26 | 10 | BBC2 Wales |
| 535.25 MHz | 29 | 10 | S4C |
| 567.25 MHz | 33 | 10 | BBC1 Wales |

==== 15 July 1997 - 15 November 1998 ====
During 1997, Channel 5 gained an analogue channel from some transmitters and Kilvey Hill was one of them. The site radiated all five UK terrestrial analogue television services at 10 kW until digital switchover was completed on 9 September 2009.

| Frequency | UHF | kW | Service |
|---|---|---|---|
| 487.25 MHz | 23 | 10 | HTV Wales |
| 511.25 MHz | 26 | 10 | BBC2 Wales |
| 535.25 MHz | 29 | 10 | S4C |
| 567.25 MHz | 33 | 10 | BBC1 Wales |
| 583.25 MHz | 35 | 10 | Channel 5 |

=== Analogue and digital television ===
==== 15 November 1998 - 12 August 2009 ====
The initial rollout of digital television in the UK involved radiating the signals at low power in between the existing analogue channels. The apparent use of channels "21" and "22-" for muxes "C" and "2" respectively might look like a mistake, but is confirmed by OFCOM's site.

| Frequency | UHF | kW | Operator | System |
|---|---|---|---|---|
| 474.000 MHz | 21 | 0.1 | Arqiva (Mux C) | DVB-T |
| 481.833 MHz | 22- | 0.6 | Digital 3&4 (Mux 2) | DVB-T |
| 487.25 MHz | 23 | 10 | HTV Wales | PAL System I |
| 505.833 MHz | 25- | 0.6 | BBC (Mux 1) | DVB-T |
| 511.25 MHz | 26 | 10 | BBC2 Wales | PAL System I |
| 529.833 MHz | 28- | 0.3 | SDN (Mux A) | DVB-T |
| 535.25 MHz | 29 | 10 | S4C | PAL System I |
| 553.833 MHz | 31- | 0.1 | Arqiva (Mux D) | DVB-T |
| 561.833 MHz | 32- | 0.6 | BBC (Mux B) | DVB-T |
| 567.25 MHz | 33 | 10 | BBC1 Wales | PAL System I |
| 583.25 MHz | 35 | 10 | Channel 5 | PAL System I |

==== 12 August 2009 - 9 September 2009 ====
The UK's digital switchover commenced with Kilvey Hill on 12 August 2009. Analogue BBC2 Wales on channel 26 was first to close, and HTV Wales was moved from channel 23 to channel 26 for its last month of service. With it went Mux 1 from channel 25- to be replaced by the new BBC A mux which started up in 64-QAM and at full power (i.e. 2 kW) on channel 23 which had just been vacated by Analogue HTV Wales..

| Frequency | UHF | kW | Operator | System |
|---|---|---|---|---|
| 474.000 MHz | 21 | 0.1 | Arqiva (Mux C) | DVB-T |
| 481.833 MHz | 22- | 0.6 | Digital 3&4 (Mux 2) | DVB-T |
| 490.000 MHz | 23 | 2 | BBC A | DVB-T |
| 511.25 MHz | 26 | 10 | HTV Wales | PAL System I |
| 529.833 MHz | 28- | 0.3 | SDN (Mux A) | DVB-T |
| 535.25 MHz | 29 | 10 | S4C | PAL System I |
| 553.833 MHz | 31- | 0.1 | Arqiva (Mux D) | DVB-T |
| 561.833 MHz | 32- | 0.6 | BBC (Mux B) | DVB-T |
| 567.25 MHz | 33 | 10 | BBC1 Wales | PAL System I |
| 583.25 MHz | 35 | 10 | Channel 5 | PAL System I |

=== Digital television ===
==== 9 September 2009 - 17 Jul 2019 ====
The remaining analogue TV services were closed down, the digital multiplexes took over their original frequencies (and a few new ones) with a power increase and a move to 64-QAM encoding. The service covers Swansea, Neath Port Talbot, Bridgend, Carmarthenshire, Pembrokeshire, and parts of South Wales including Cowbridge and the Vale of Glamorgan where the Wenvoe Transmitters’ signals are shielded by hills.

| Frequency | UHF | kW | Operator |
|---|---|---|---|
| 482.000 MHz | 22 | 2 | Arqiva A |
| 490.000 MHz | 23 | 2 | BBC A |
| 506.000 MHz | 25 | 2 | SDN |
| 514.000 MHz | 26 | 2 | Digital 3&4 |
| 530.000 MHz | 28 | 2 | Arqiva B |
| 538.000 MHz | 29 | 2 | BBC B |

==== 17 Jul 2019 - present ====
Services have moved to different frequencies.

| Frequency | UHF | kW | Operator |
|---|---|---|---|
| 474.000 MHz | 21 | 2 | BBC A |
| 482.000 MHz | 22 | 2 | Arqiva A |
| 498.000 MHz | 24 | 2 | Digital 3&4 |
| 506.000 MHz | 25 | 2 | SDN |
| 522.000 MHz | 27 | 2 | BBC B |
| 530.000 MHz | 28 | 2 | Arqiva B |
| 578.000 MHz | 34 | 2 | _local |

=== Analogue radio (VHF FM) ===
==== 30 September 1974 - Early 1980s ====
The first FM radio from the site was Wales' first independent radio station, Swansea Sound.

| Frequency | kW | Service | Description |
|---|---|---|---|
| 95.1 MHz | 1.0 | Swansea Sound | Contemporary and chart music and information station for under 44s |

==== Early 1980s - 1989 ====
Swansea Sound changed frequency to 96.4 MHz as required by a new bandplan for Band II broadcasting which placed BBC stations below 96 MHz and Independent Local Radio stations above that. The band limit was 98 MHz at that point. BBC Radio 2, BBC Radio 3 and BBC Radio Cymru commenced from the site sometime before 1988 as the BBC's Service Area map of 1988 shows.

| Frequency | kW | Service | Description |
|---|---|---|---|
| 89.5 MHz | 0.925 | BBC Radio 2 | Adult contemporary music-led service |
| 91.7 MHz | 0.925 | BBC Radio 3 | Classical, jazz, world music and the arts |
| 93.9 MHz | 0.925 | BBC Radio Cymru | Welsh language service |
| 96.4 MHz | 1.5 | Swansea Sound | Contemporary and chart music and information station for under 44s |

==== 1989 - 30 September 1995 ====
The 1988 bandplan for Band II raised the upper limit for broadcasting to 100 MHz and Radio 1 gained its own frequency.

| Frequency | kW | Service | Description |
|---|---|---|---|
| 89.5 MHz | 0.925 | BBC Radio 2 | Adult contemporary music-led service |
| 91.7 MHz | 0.925 | BBC Radio 3 | Classical, jazz, world music and the arts |
| 93.9 MHz | 0.925 | BBC Radio Cymru | Welsh language service |
| 96.4 MHz | 1.5 | Swansea Sound | Contemporary and chart music and information station for under 44s |
| 99.1 MHz | 0.925 | BBC Radio 1 | New and popular music, news, entertainment and talk |

==== 30 September 1995 - 1997 ====
Swansea Sound changed its name first to "96.4 Sound Wave" then (quickly) to 96.4 The Wave.

| Frequency | kW | Service | Description |
|---|---|---|---|
| 89.5 MHz | 0.925 | BBC Radio 2 | Adult contemporary music-led service |
| 91.7 MHz | 0.925 | BBC Radio 3 | Classical, jazz, world music and the arts |
| 93.9 MHz | 0.925 | BBC Radio Cymru | Welsh language service |
| 96.4 MHz | 1.5 | The Wave | Contemporary and chart music and information station for under 44s |
| 99.1 MHz | 0.925 | BBC Radio 1 | New and popular music, news, entertainment and talk |

==== 1997 - present ====
Classic FM came on air in 1997, the other new services have joined at various times since then. Radio Cymru has moved to 104.2 MHz with BBC Radio Wales taking over the vacated 93.9 MHz slot.

| Frequency | kW | Service | Description |
|---|---|---|---|
| 89.5 MHz | 0.925 | BBC Radio 2 | Adult contemporary music-led service |
| 91.7 MHz | 0.925 | BBC Radio 3 | Classical, jazz, world music and the arts |
| 93.9 MHz | 0.925 | BBC Radio Wales | A music-led service, with talk and entertainment revolving around Wales |
| 94.6 MHz | 0.925 | BBC Radio 4 | Speech, news and current affairs |
| 96.4 MHz | 1.5 | Hits Radio South Wales | Contemporary and chart music and information station for under 44s |
| 99.1 MHz | 0.925 | BBC Radio 1 | New and popular music, news, entertainment and talk |
| 101.3 MHz | 0.5 | Classic FM | Classical music |
| 102.1 MHz | 1.25 | Swansea Bay Radio | Adult contemporary |
| 104.2 MHz | 0.925 | BBC Radio Cymru | Welsh language service |
| 106.0 MHz | 1 | Heart South Wales | Adult contemporary, news, entertainment and sports. Formerly Real Radio |
| 107.3 MHz | 1.25 | Nation Radio Wales | Adult contemporary |

=== Digital radio (DAB) ===
| Frequency | Block | kW | Operator |
|---|---|---|---|
| 222.064 MHz | 11D | 1 | Digital One |
| 223.936 MHz | 12A | 2 | Swansea SW Wales |
| 225.648 MHz | 12B | 4.1 | BBC National DAB |
| 229.072 MHz | 12D | 1.2 | MuxCo Mid & West Wales |
| 216.928 MHz | 11A | 5 | SDL National |
