= BBC Cymru Fyw =

- Website type: Portal
- Owner: BBC Cymru Wales
- Creator: BBC
- Website: www.bbc.co.uk/cymrufyw
- Commercial: No (Yes if accessed outside the UK)
- Launched: 2014; 12 years ago
- Current status: Active

BBC Cymru Fyw (BBC Wales Live) is the online Welsh-language service provided by BBC Cymru Wales. It was launched in 2014 in order to replace the BBC Cymru ar lein service. It provides news coverage, magazine-style information and video clips, all through the medium of Welsh.

Cymru Fyw received around 53,000 unique browser visits each week in 2016–2017, which was an increase of 11,000 visits compared to the previous year.
