= Preseli transmitting station =

Transmitter station in Pembrokeshire, Wales

Preseli
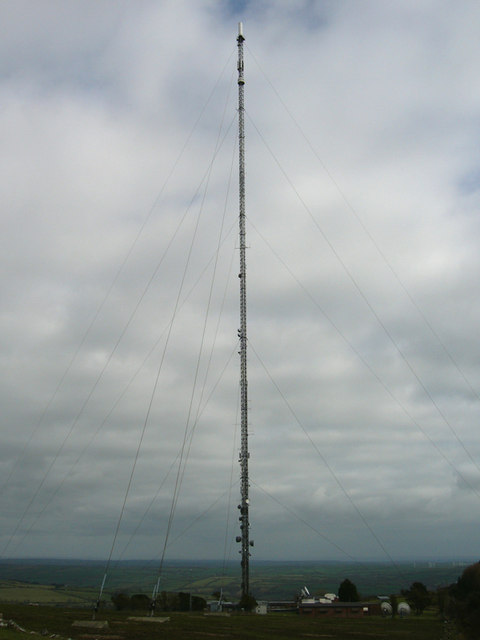

- Location within Pembrokeshire
- Mast height: 235.4 metres (772 ft)
- Coordinates: 51.944444°N 4.661111°W
- Grid reference: SN172306
- Built: 1962
- BBC region: BBC Wales
- ITV region: ITV Cymru Wales

The Preseli transmitting station (formerly spelt Presely) is a broadcasting and telecommunications facility on the eastern end of the Preseli Mountains, close to the villages of Crymych and Pentre Galar in Pembrokeshire, Wales (grid reference SN172306). It is owned and operated by Arqiva.

It has a 235.4-metre (772 ft) high guyed steel lattice mast. It was constructed in 1962 by the IBA to transmit ITV 405-line television with transmissions commencing on Band III channel 8 from antennas at 559 m (1,835 ft) above sea level. The triangle of antenna arrays aimed beams of signal towards Pembrokeshire, another lobe was directed towards western Carmarthenshire and a northward beam covered south western Cardiganshire. The northward beam from the site also fed the transmitter at Arfon in North Wales.

The Welsh region ITV programming was initially provided by Teledu Cymru which was taken over by TWW in 1964, and eventually HTV Wales who took over from 1968.

In 1971, three protesters from Cymdeithas yr Iaith Gymraeg were jailed for "conspiring to trespass" after gaining access to the site compound and climbing the lower section of the mast. This was part of a series of protests in Wales aiming to get a dedicated Welsh-language TV channel established. The campaign was eventually considered to have been mostly successful with the establishment of S4C (Sianel 4 Cymru) eleven years later.

The site was uprated in 1973 to transmit UHF 625-line PAL analogue television channels, starting with BBC1, BBC2 and HTV Wales, with S4C being added in late 1982. The VHF channel 8 transmissions were discontinued in January 1985 as 405-line TV in the UK was phased out. Channel 5 started analogue TV transmissions in 1997. Six digital TV multiplexes were added in 1998 and the site kept this configuration until 2009, when all analogue television signals were permanently switched off.

The mast also carries Classic FM on 100.5 MHz and Heart South Wales on 105.7 MHz, and transmits national digital radio multiplexes for the BBC and Digital One multiplexes. In 2017, Nation Radio started broadcasting on 107.10 MHz.

The transmitter signals were also received across the Irish sea in many parts of the east and south east coast of the Republic of Ireland, mainly in counties Dublin and Wicklow. From 1962 onward, many households in these counties would point their outdoor aerials towards the Irish sea and could receive transmission from this transmitter. When cable television launched in the early 1970s, the Welsh BBC and ITV stations were provided on the cable platform as these channels were mainly received in the Dublin and Wicklow counties.

== Transmissions ==
=== Analogue television ===
==== 14 September 1962 – 16 August 1973 ====
Frequency	VHF	kW	Service
189.75 MHz	8	100	HTV Wales (Teledu Cymru until 1968)

==== 16 August 1973 – 1 November 1982 ====
Colour TV eventually came to West Wales. This was fairly late by UK standards, but even the area's M.P. couldn't get it started any quicker.

Frequency	VHF	UHF	kW	Service
189.75 MHz	8	—	100	HTV Wales
623.25 MHz	—	40	100	BBC2 Wales
647.25 MHz	—	43	100	HTV Wales
671.25 MHz	—	46	100	BBC1 Wales

==== 1 November 1982 – 3 January 1985 ====
The launch of Channel 4 (S4C in Wales) took the UHF capabilities of the site to its design maximum. Being in Wales, this transmitter radiated the S4C variant.

Frequency	VHF	UHF	kW	Service
189.75 MHz	8	—	100	HTV Wales
623.25 MHz	—	40	100	BBC2 Wales
647.25 MHz	—	43	100	HTV Wales
671.25 MHz	15V	46	100	BBC1 Wales
703.25 MHz	1V	50	100	S4C

==== 3 January 1985 – 30 March 1997 ====
The VHF television transmitter was shut down after 22 years and 3 months of service.

Frequency	UHF	kW	Service
623.25 MHz	40	100	BBC2 Wales
647.25 MHz	43	100	HTV Wales
671.25 MHz	46	100	BBC1 Wales
703.25 MHz	50	100	S4C

==== 30 March 1997 – 15 November 1998 ====
Channel 5 started broadcasting on UHF channel 37. A fifth analogue TV channel was outside the design specifications of the British UHF transmitter plan and this forced the use of out-of-band channel 37 which was supposed to be kept clear of transmissions.

Frequency	UHF	kW	Service
599.25 MHz	37	100	Channel 5
623.25 MHz	40	100	BBC2 Wales
647.25 MHz	43	100	HTV Wales
671.25 MHz	46	100	BBC1 Wales
703.25 MHz	50	100	S4C

=== Analogue and digital television ===
==== 15 November 1998 – 19 August 2009 ====
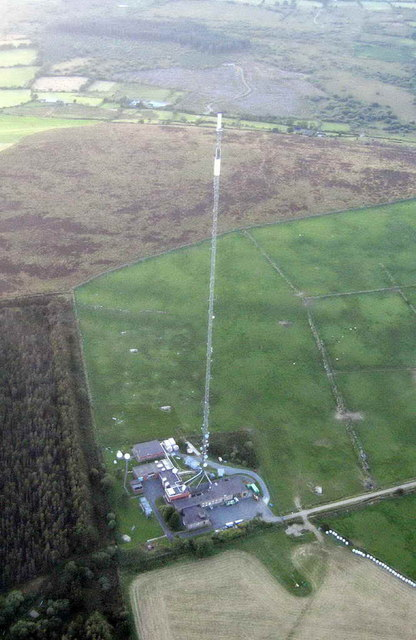
The station from the air in 2007

This was the initial roll-out for digital television using the DVB-T system. The transmitter frequencies and power outputs were chosen not to interfere with the UHF TV channels, but to be received with the same aerial-group. The QAM constellations and number of carriers were changed around 2002 after the collapse of ITV Digital as the service was taken over by the Freeview consortium.

Frequency	UHF	kW	Service	System
599.25 MHz	37	100	Channel 5	PAL System I
618.000 MHz	39	1	SDN (Mux A)	DVB-T
623.25 MHz	40	100	BBC2 Wales	PAL System I
641.833 MHz	42-	2	BBC (Mux B)	DVB-T
647.25 MHz	43	100	HTV Wales	PAL System I
665.833 MHz	45-	1	Arqiva (Mux C)	DVB-T
671.25 MHz	46	100	BBC1 Wales	PAL System I
682.166 MHz	47+	2	BBC (Mux 1)	DVB-T
697.833 MHz	49-	1	Arqiva (Mux D)	DVB-T
703.25 MHz	50	100	S4C	PAL System I
714.166 MHz	51+	2	Digital 3&4 (Mux 2)	DVB-T

==== 19 August 2009 – 16 September 2009 ====
BBC2 Wales on channel 40 closed after 36 years of service, and HTV Wales was moved from channel 43 to the vacated channel 40 for what would be its final month of service.

Multiplex 1 on channel 47+ was renamed BBC A and moved to channel 43+ (which had just been vacated by analogue HTV Wales). In addition to the power increase to 20 kW ERP, it was reconfigured to 64QAM and 8k carriers, which resulted in a service area similar to the old analogue transmissions but with much more bandwidth available than Multiplex 1 ever had.

For the duration of the switchover, all the channels carried on Multiplex B were duplicated on this new PSB1 multiplex.

Frequency	UHF	kW	Service	System
599.25 MHz	37	100	Channel 5	PAL System I
618.000 MHz	39	1	SDN (Mux A)	DVB-T
623.25 MHz	40	100	HTV Wales	PAL System I
641.833 MHz	42-	2	BBC (Mux B)	DVB-T
650.166 MHz	43+	20	BBC A	DVB-T
665.833 MHz	45-	1	Arqiva (Mux C)	DVB-T
671.25 MHz	46	100	BBC1 Wales	PAL System I
697.833 MHz	49-	1	Arqiva (Mux D)	DVB-T
703.25 MHz	50	100	S4C	PAL System I
714.166 MHz	51+	2	Digital 3&4 (Mux 2)	DVB-T

=== Digital television ===
==== 16 September 2009 – 31 October 2012 ====
All remaining analogue television was shut down after 36 years of service. The pre-switchover low-power digital transmissions (apart from Arq A and SDN) were upgraded to full power and configured to 64QAM and 8k carriers, with some frequency changes and with new names for the multiplexes:

Frequency	UHF	kW	Operator
641.833 MHz	42-	10	SDN
650.166 MHz	43+	20	BBC A
665.833 MHz	45-	10	Arqiva A
674.166 MHz	46+	20	Digital 3&4
697.833 MHz	49-	10	Arqiva B
706.166 MHz	50+	20	BBC B

==== 31 October 2012 – present ====
As a side-effect of frequency-changes elsewhere in the region to do with clearance of the 800 MHz band for 4G mobile phone use, Preseli's "Arqiva B" multiplex was moved from channel 49- to channel 39+ and the "BBC B" multiplex was moved from channel 50+ to channel 40+.

Frequency	UHF	kW	Operator
618.166 MHz	39+	10	Arqiva B
626.166 MHz	40+	20	BBC B
641.833 MHz	42-	10	SDN
650.166 MHz	43+	20	BBC A
665.833 MHz	45-	10	Arqiva A
674.166 MHz	46+	20	Digital 3&4

=== Analogue radio (FM VHF) ===
==== September 1992 – September 2003 ====
First FM transmissions from Preseli.

Frequency	kW		Service
Frequency	H	V	Service
100.5 MHz	1.4	5.9	Classic FM

==== September 2003 – present ====
Frequency	kW		Service
Frequency	H	V	Service
100.5 MHz	1.4	5.9	Classic FM
105.7 MHz	9.4	—	Heart South Wales -107.10 Nation Radio

In 2017, Nation Radio on 107.10 MHz started broadcasting on the Preseli at 2.5KW, with a directional antenna. This signal penetrates all of Pembrokeshire and most of Carmarthenshire.

=== Digital radio (DAB) ===
==== 20 April 2006 – present ====
Frequency	Block	kW	Operator
222.064 MHz	11D	1	Digital One
225.648 MHz	12B	5	BBC National DAB
229.072 MHz	12D	-	Mid & West Wales

== See also ==
- List of masts
- List of tallest buildings and structures in Great Britain
- List of radio stations in the United Kingdom
