= Carmel transmitting station =

Television transmitter in southwestern Wales

Carmel
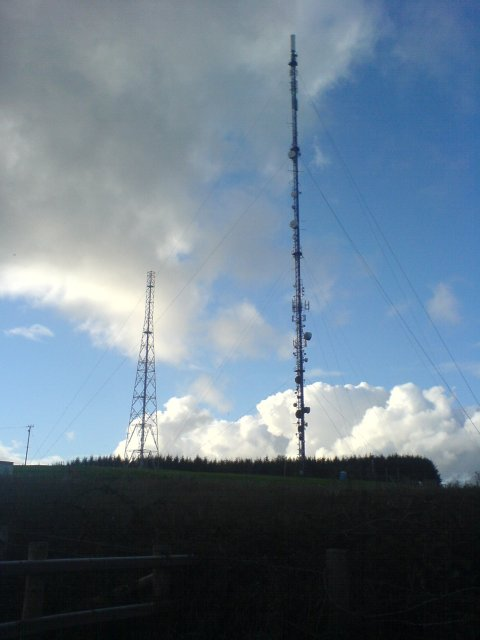

- Location within Carmarthenshire
- Mast height: 151.9 metres (498 ft)
- Coordinates: 51.8225°N 4.0567°W
- Built: 1973
- BBC region: BBC Wales
- ITV region: ITV Cymru Wales

The Carmel transmitting station, located half a mile (0.8km) SSW of the village of Carmel in Carmarthenshire, has been broadcasting terrestrial TV and radio services since the mid-1970s. The TV coverage area for the Carmel transmission station includes most of Carmarthenshire, the southern and eastern parts of Pembrokeshire; the southern fringes of Powys and Ceredigion; the northern part of Swansea. The Carmel signal is also receivable in parts of Neath Port Talbot, Bridgend and Rhondda Cynon Taff. Places as far away as Merthyr Tydfil and the north Devon coast are also able to receive signals from Carmel.

Carmel started to switch over to digital terrestrial TV broadcast services on 26 August 2009.

== Services available ==
=== Analogue television ===
==== 21 May 1973 - 1 November 1982 ====
Carmel never did broadcast VHF television, and went live with the UK's three national UHF television services.

Frequency	UHF	kW	Service
759.25 MHz	57	100	BBC1 Wales
783.25 MHz	60	100	HTV Wales
807.25 MHz	63	100	BBC2 Wales

==== 1 November 1982 - 15 November 1998 ====
The UK's fourth national television service joined the set transmitted from the site. Being in Wales, the S4C variant was broadcast.

Frequency	UHF	kW	Service
727.25 MHz	53	100	S4C
759.25 MHz	57	100	BBC1 Wales
783.25 MHz	60	100	HTV Wales
807.25 MHz	63	100	BBC2 Wales

=== Analogue and digital television ===
==== 15 November 1998 - 26 August 2009 ====
The initial rollout of digital television in the UK involved radiating the signals at low power in between the existing analogue channels.

Frequency	UHF	kW	Service	System
727.25 MHz	53	100	S4C	PAL System I
746.000 MHz	55	2.5	BBC (Mux 1)	DVB-T
759.25 MHz	57	100	BBC1 Wales	PAL System I
777.833 MHz	59-	5	SDN (Mux A)	DVB-T
783.25 MHz	60	100	HTV Wales	PAL System I
801.833 MHz	62-	2.5	BBC (Mux B)	DVB-T
807.25 MHz	63	100	BBC2 Wales	PAL System I
825.833 MHz	65-	2.5	Digital 3&4 (Mux 2)	DVB-T
834.000 MHz	66	1	Arqiva (Mux C)	DVB-T
842.000 MHz	67	1	Arqiva (Mux D)	DVB-T

==== 26 August 2009 - 23 September 2009 ====
The UK's digital switchover commenced at this site. Analogue BBC2 Wales closed on channel 63 and HTV took over on that frequency for what would be its final 3 weeks of service, vacating channel 60 as it did so. The new BBC A multiplex started up at full power in 64-QAM mode on channel 60 (which just had been Vacated by Analogue HTV Wales) and Mux 1 on channel 55 closed.

Frequency	UHF	kW	Service	System
727.25 MHz	53	100	S4C	PAL System I
759.25 MHz	57	100	BBC1 Wales	PAL System I
777.833 MHz	59-	5	SDN (Mux A)	DVB-T
786.000 MHz	60	20	BBC A	DVB-T
801.833 MHz	62-	2.5	BBC (Mux B)	DVB-T
807.25 MHz	63	100	HTV Wales	PAL System I
825.833 MHz	65-	2.5	Digital 3&4 (Mux 2)	DVB-T
834.000 MHz	66	1	Arqiva (Mux C)	DVB-T
842.000 MHz	67	1	Arqiva (Mux D)	DVB-T

=== Digital television ===
==== 23 September 2009 - may 2013 ====
All the analogue television services closed and the new digital multiplexes took over their frequencies (and two new ones) with name-changes, power increases and a shift to 64-QAM.

Frequency	UHF	kW	Operator
730.000 MHz	53	20	Digital 3&4
738.000 MHz	54	10	SDN
762.000 MHz	57	20	BBC B
770.000 MHz	58	10	Arqiva A
786.000 MHz	60	20	BBC A
794.000 MHz	61	10	Arqiva B

==== May 2013 ====
As a side-effect of frequency-changes elsewhere in the region to do with clearance of the 800 MHz band for 4G mobile phone use, Carmel's "Arqiva B" multiplex will have to be moved from channel 61 to channel 49 and the "BBC A" multiplex will get a negative offset.

Frequency	UHF	kW	Operator
690.000 MHz	48	10	Arqiva B
514.000 MHz	26 (was 53)	20	Digital 3&4
570.000 MHz	33 (was 54)	10	SDN
538.000 MHz	29 (was 57)	20	BBC B
594.000 MHz	36 (was 58)	10	Arqiva A
490.000 MHz	23 (was 60-)	20	BBC A

=== Analogue radio (VHF FM) ===
Frequency	kW	Service
88.4 MHz	3	BBC Radio 2
90.6 MHz	3	BBC Radio 3
92.8 MHz	3	BBC Radio 4
95.1 MHz	3	BBC Radio Wales
97.1 MHz	1.4	Radio Carmarthenshire
98.0 MHz	3	BBC Radio 1
104.6 MHz	3	BBC Radio Cymru
105.2 MHz	3	Heart South Wales

=== Digital radio (DAB) ===
Frequency	Block	kW	Operator
222.064 MHz	11D	1	Digital One
223.936 MHz	12A	1	Swansea SW Wales
225.648 MHz	12B	5	BBC National DAB
