= ITV Cymru Wales =

ITV franchise for Wales

- Logo used since 2014

- Type: Region of television network
- Branding: ITV1 Cymru Wales
- Country: United Kingdom
- First air date: 1 January 2014; 12 years ago
- TV transmitters: Wenvoe, Carmel, Preseli, Blaenplwyf, Llanddona, Moel-y-Parc, Long Mountain, Kilvey Hill
- Headquarters: Cardiff
- Broadcast area: Wales
- Owner: ITV plc
- Picture format: 1080i HDTV, downscaled to 16:9 576i for SDTV
- Affiliation: ITV
- Official website: www.itv.com/wales/
- Language: English (and Welsh production for S4C)
- Replaced: ITV Wales & West

ITV Cymru Wales is the ITV franchise for Wales. The new separate licence began on 1 January 2014, replacing the long-serving dual franchise region ITV Wales & West serving Wales and the West of England, which had previously used the branding "ITV Wales" within the Wales subregion.

== Licence ==
The licence continues to be held by ITV Broadcasting Ltd, who hold all Channel 3 licences in England and Wales.

The former HTV West company was legally named ITV Wales and West Ltd until it was dissolved on 14 January 2025. The company was, along with most other regional companies, owned by ITV plc, though listed at Companies House as a "dormant company".

== History ==
The broadcasting licence was created following the split of ITV Wales & West. It is hoped that the separate licence will benefit local viewers.

In May 2012, Ofcom raised the possibility of a stand-alone licence for Wales.

On 25 August 2015, ITV Cymru Wales began broadcasting in HD (prior to this HD viewers in Wales received ITV Central HD), including the company's news service and non-news programming including current affairs and documentaries.

== Programming ==
ITV Cymru Wales produces around six hours a week of national news, current affairs and features programming in English. Its flagship programme Wales at Six broadcasts each weeknight at 6pm with shorter ITV News Cymru Wales bulletins throughout the day and during the weekend.

The news service is supplemented by regular current affairs programmes including Newsweek Wales on Sunday lunchtimes, the long-running investigative series Wales This Week and the political review Sharp End on Monday nights. Feature series are also broadcast throughout the year, including rural affairs series Coast and Country, political interview strand Face to Face and the arts and entertainment show Backstage.

ITV Cymru Wales also produces Welsh language output for S4C in the fields of current affairs, features, drama and entertainment. Two of its flagship titles figure among S4C's longest-running and most popular programmes, the rural documentary series Cefn Gwlad and the investigative current affairs programmes Y Byd ar Bedwar and Ein Byd.

ITV Cymru Wales are also known for a number of half hour documentaries, which debut in Wales before getting a slot on the main ITV network at a time which usually provides a convenient opt-out slot for viewers in Scotland watching on ITV Border or on STV. Many of the documentaries are of a format which tracks year in the life of a coastal resort or area, with The Village documenting Portmeirion, The Strait showing life around the Menai Strait and The Harbour showing a year in Tenby. ITV Cymru Wales' latest coastal six-part series is The Pier, with Llandudno Pier having been filmed during the summer of 2021. The series started on ITV Cymru Wales on 4 October 2021, with one episode from the series broadcast so far on ITV in England on 13 March 2022.

In addition to these shows, The Mountain and Return to the Mountain were filmed on Mount Snowdon, while Sean Fletcher has presented a couple of walking documentaries for ITV Cymru Wales with Wonders of the Border taking Flecher along the Offa's Dyke Path and Wonders of the Coast Path showing him along the 870-mile long Wales Coast Path. In addition to these programmes, which have also been broadcast by ITV in England, Fletcher is currently a presenter on Coast & Country alongside Ruth Dodsworth, with the programme transmitted in Wales since 2013.

ITV regional service
Preceded by ITV Wales & West as ITV Wales	Wales; 1 January 2014 – present	Current provider as ITV Cymru Wales
