= BBC Cymru Wales =

British Broadcasting Corporation department

- BBC Cymru Wales logo

- BBC Cymru Wales' area within the UK
- TV stations: BBC One Wales; BBC Two Wales
- TV transmitters: Blaenplwyf; Carmel; Kilvey Hill; Llanddona; Moel-y-Parc; Preseli; Prestatyn; Wenvoe
- Radio stations: BBC Radio Wales; BBC Radio Cymru; BBC Radio Cymru 2
- Headquarters: New Broadcasting House, Cardiff
- Area: Wales
- Parent: BBC
- Key people: Rhuanedd Richards (Director of BBC Cymru Wales)
- Launch date: 9 February 1964; 62 years ago
- Official website: bbc.co.uk/wales (English) bbc.co.uk/cymru (Welsh)
- Language: English and Welsh (Cymraeg)

BBC Cymru Wales is a division of the BBC and the main public broadcaster in Wales.

It is one of the four BBC national regions, alongside the BBC English Regions, BBC Northern Ireland and BBC Scotland. Established in 1964, BBC Cymru Wales is based in Cardiff and directly employs some 1,200 people to produce a range of programmes for television, radio and online services in both English and Welsh.

BBC Cymru Wales operates two TV channels (BBC One Wales, BBC Two Wales) and three radio stations (BBC Radio Wales, BBC Radio Cymru and BBC Radio Cymru 2). The total budget for BBC Cymru Wales (including S4C's £76 million) is £151 million, £31 million of which is for BBC-produced television productions.

== Services ==
=== Television ===
Former BBC Cymru Wales logo

BBC Cymru Wales operates two television services, BBC One Wales and BBC Two Wales, which can opt out of the main network feed of BBC One and BBC Two in England to broadcast national programming. These two channels broadcast a variety of programmes in English, including the flagship news programme BBC Wales Today which broadcasts several bulletins throughout the day including the main evening programme.

In addition to these two channels, BBC Cymru Wales is required to provide programmes in Welsh, which it supplies to the Welsh language channel S4C free of charge using the BBC Cymru brand. These programmes include a Welsh news service Newyddion, covering Welsh, general UK and international news, and a soap opera Pobol y Cwm, the longest running television soap opera made by the BBC. Under a partnership agreement with S4C, BBC Cymru Wales provides playout and technology services to the channel.

=== Radio ===
BBC Cymru Wales operates three radio stations covering the entire country. BBC Radio Wales is the English language network, broadcasting local programmes for approximately 20 hours a day and simulcasting BBC Radio 5 Live during the station's down time. BBC Radio Cymru broadcasts Welsh language programming for over 18 hours a day, providing a mix of general entertainment and factual programming, while BBC Radio Cymru 2 provides separate music-led programming at certain hours. While off air, both Radio Cymru stations simulcast overnight programmes from the BBC World Service and BBC Radio 2 respectively.

=== Online and interactive ===
BBC Cymru Wales operates its own mini-site on BBC Online as well as providing news and features for other areas of BBC Online. In addition, news stories are provided for the BBC Red Button interactive service. They also operate BBC Cymru Fyw, which provides news coverage and magazine-style information in Welsh.

=== BBC National Orchestra of Wales ===
BBC Cymru Wales employs a full-time orchestra, the BBC National Orchestra of Wales (BBC NOW), who give concerts in Cardiff, Swansea and across Wales. The majority of the orchestra's concerts are recorded for broadcast on BBC Radio 3, BBC Radio Wales and BBC Radio Cymru. Since January 2009 the administrative base of the NOW has been the BBC Hoddinott Hall, in the Wales Millennium Centre, Cardiff.

== History ==
The logo of BBC Cymru Wales between 1988 and 1997.

The first broadcast in Wales was on 13 February 1923 from the radio station 5WA at 19 Castle Street, Cardiff.

In March 1924 they moved into larger premises at 39 Park Place, later taking over most of the properties on the street.

During this time, the region was served from bases around Wales. During World War II, the regional services all ceased and broadcast the Home Service from London, although some Welsh content was included. The BBC's Bangor base played host to the BBC Variety Department during the war, although this fact was never officially announced.

Following the end of the Second World War, the BBC Home Service continued its regional opt-outs, including an opt-out service for Wales. This opt-out continued after the change from the Home Service to Radio 4 and paved the way for two full-time radio services - BBC Radio Cymru in 1977, followed a year later by BBC Radio Wales.

In 1952 they bought a 10-acre site at Baynton House in Llandaff, Cardiff, to house all of its operations in the city.

The BBC has also occupied other locations in Cardiff such as: Celtic Road in Gabalfa, Newport Road in Roath, above a Spar shop in Llandaff village, and Charles Street in the city centre.

The first television signals in Wales came on 15 August 1952 from the newly constructed Wenvoe transmitter. The transmitter itself broadcast the national BBC Television service. Wales would gain some significance when, in 1957, the BBC West region from Bristol was established including a daily five-minute news bulletin for Wales, followed five years later by the launch of the daily magazine programme, Wales Today.

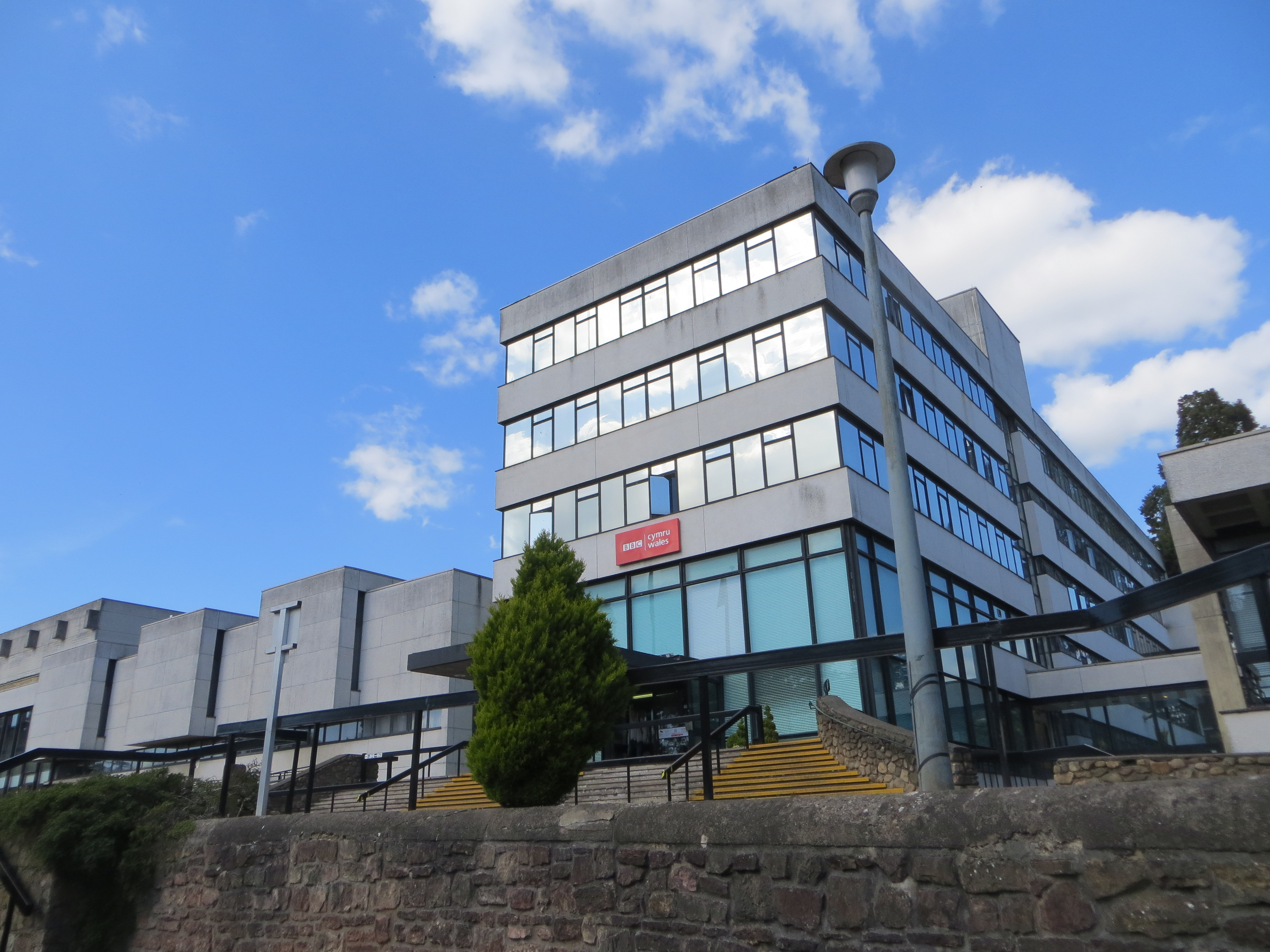
Broadcasting House, Cardiff

The launch of BBC Wales on 9 February 1964 provided a specific television service for the country. The new service was heavily promoted (proclaiming that Wales gets its very own TV service in 1964!) with animated promos using the sound of Welsh choirs to explain about interference from the mountains. Two years later in 1966, BBC Cymru Wales' new headquarters at Broadcasting House in Cardiff opened and the first colour broadcast for Wales followed in 1970.

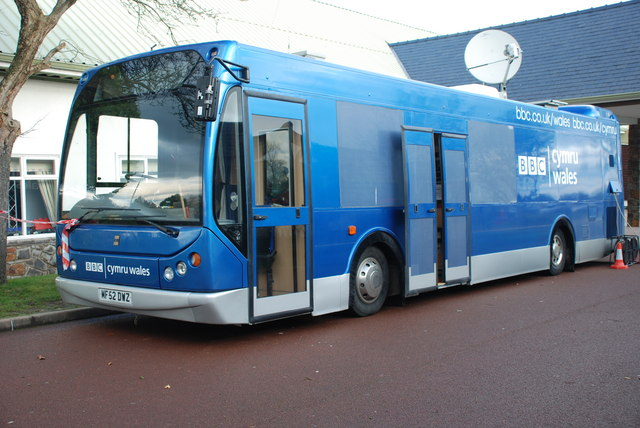
BBC Cymru Wales outside broadcast vehicle, 2009

Prior to 1982, BBC Cymru Wales on television provided programmes in both English and Welsh, with the news programme Heddiw and the long-running serial Pobol y Cwm figuring among the key output. However, this changed with the launch of S4C on 1 November 1982 as all Welsh-language programming on both the BBC and the ITV contractor HTV was transferred to the new channel. As part of a guaranteed ten hours a week of BBC-produced programming, Pobol y Cwm switched to the new channel while a newly expanded news service, Newyddion, was launched.

Into the late 1990s, BBC Cymru Wales continued to expand their services. The first web pages for Wales began to appear on BBC Online in 1997, including a variety of features surrounding programming, schedules, community events and other stories. The following year, BBC Wales gained additional air time through the use of a late prime-time to midnight opt-out from new digital channel BBC Choice. This lasted until opt-outs ended on the channel in 2001; subsequently BBC Wales opted out of the BBC Two prime-time schedule on digital platforms to broadcast BBC 2W. This latter service closed on 2 January 2009 – prior to the digital switchover which would have ceased separate broadcasting on analogue and digital.

Expansion in the number of drama productions handled by BBC Cymru Wales since 2011 has resulted in the construction and opening on a new studio centre in Cardiff.

In August 2013, it was announced that Broadcasting House and Ty Oldfield (Oldfield House), opposite, was for sale, with plans to move to a new a purpose-built headquarters in the city centre. The BBC attributed the decision to "ageing infrastructure at Llandaff" and considered sites including Central Square, land south of Cardiff Central railway station, and land between the Senedd and Atradius. In 2014, it was confirmed that Broadcasting House would be demolished and turned into 400 residential units. The BBC confirmed in 2015 that Central Square would be the location of their new headquarters building and began to move out of Llandaff studios in 2019.

The New Broadcasting House opened in 2020. In July 2020 BBC One Wales and BBC Two Wales Presentation and Playout move from Llandaff to become the first live services from the new building. This was followed by the first radio broadcasts, by BBC Radio Cymru 2 host Daniel Glyn on the 25 July and by Radio Wales host Owen Money on 31 July. TV News moved into the building in September 2020 when viewers saw the building's roof garden in a live report by reporter Alex Jennings as part of an afternoon broadcast of Wales Today.

In September 2026 Garmon Rhys, the interim director of BBC Wales, confirmed that 58 jobs would be cut as part of wider cost-saving measures across the BBC. £9 million would need to be saved in 2027/28.

== Studios ==
=== Central Square, Cardiff ===
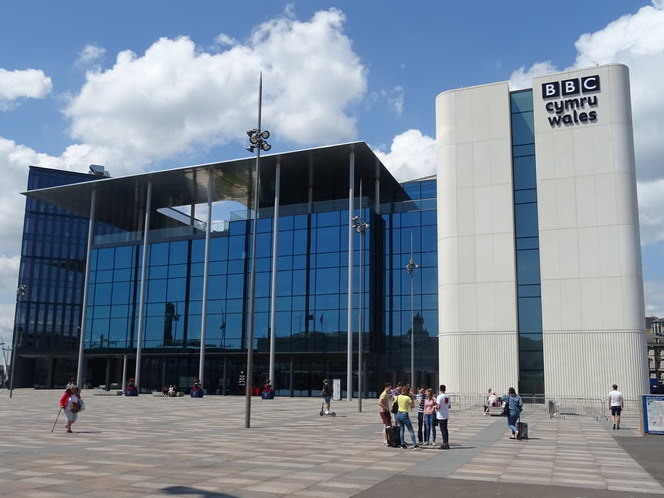
BBC Cymru Wales headquarters at Central Square, Cardiff

The current headquarters of BBC Cymru Wales is New Broadcasting House, based in Cardiff's Central Square in the heart of the city. It opened in 2019, with broadcasting starting in 2020. The new building is the base for almost all BBC Cymru Wales staff, and is purpose built to house radio and TV production teams. It is the home of BBC Cymru Wales's news services, in English and Welsh, Wales Today, BBC Radio Wales and BBC Radio Cymru, as well as production teams for UK-wide programming and programmes commissioned by S4C.

Its location was decided in June 2014, on the site of the former Cardiff Central bus station. It can house up to 1,000 staff, with around half the floor space of its former Llandaff base and with 70% less studio space. Fewer studios were needed in the new headquarters partly as a result of the new purpose build facilities for drama and BBC National Orchestra of Wales in Cardiff Bay. Staff started to move into the new headquarters in October 2019,

=== Studios in Cardiff Bay (Roath Lock and Hoddinott Hall) ===
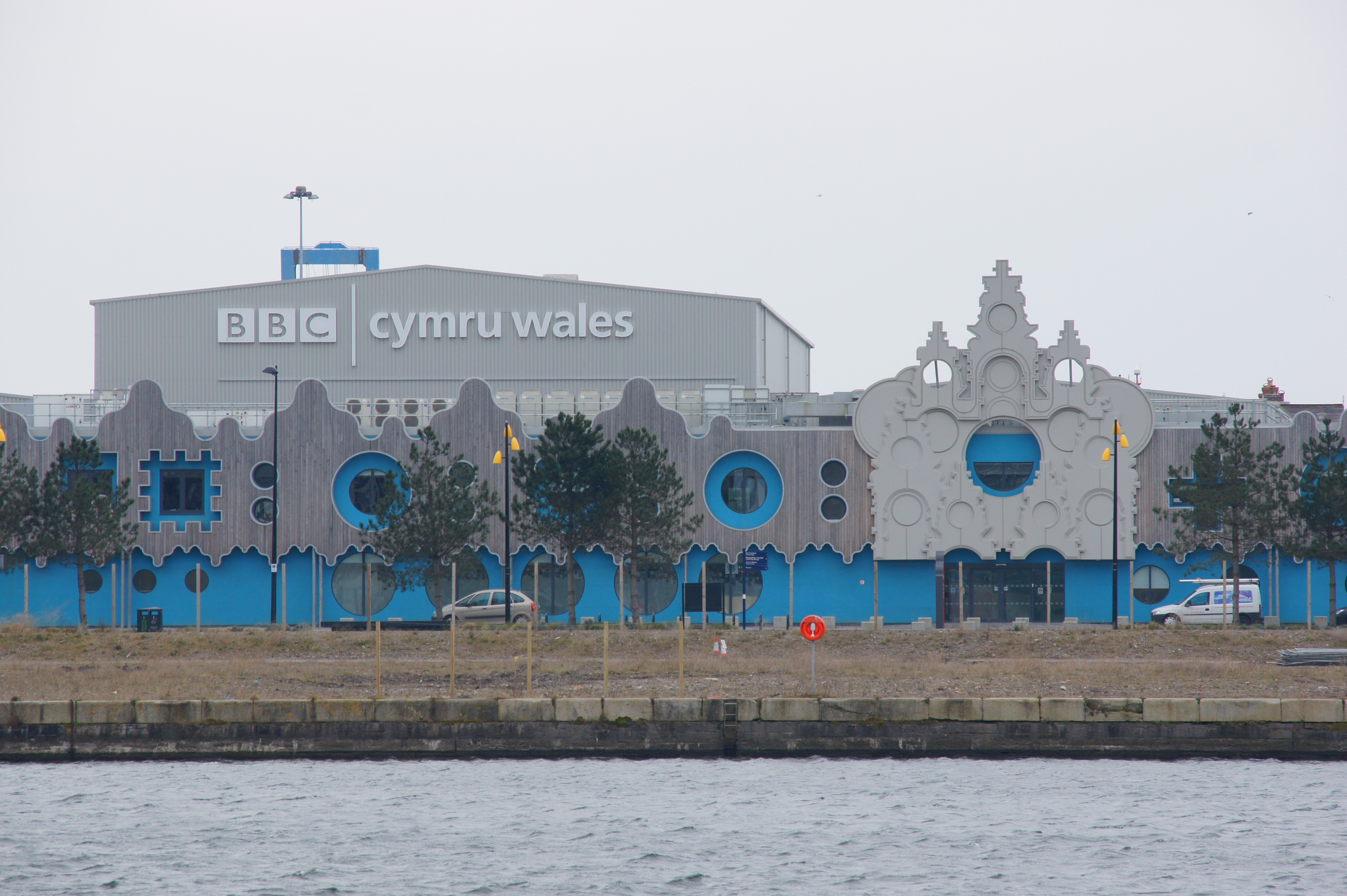
BBC Cymru Wales' Roath Lock studio complex.

The expansion of BBC Cymru Wales' drama productions in recent years has resulted in investment for new studios. Drama production for BBC Cymru Wales is currently based at Roath Lock studios in Cardiff Bay. The main year-round productions on site include Doctor Who and Casualty, both made for BBC One, and Pobol y Cwm, which BBC Cymru Wales produces on behalf of S4C.

In the 2000s, as a temporary measure to generate extra capacity, BBC Wales invested into Upper Boat Studios in Pontypridd to house several productions, notable centred around the 2005 revival of Doctor Who and its sister productions Torchwood and The Sarah Jane Adventures. Despite the investment in Upper Boat, the studio complex soon became too small to house new productions being moved to the BBC Nations. As part of this decision, it was decided in March 2009 that BBC productions Casualty and Crimewatch were to relocate from their former homes at BBC Bristol network production unit to Cardiff.

To house these new programmes, a new 170,000-square-foot (16,000 m^{2}) studio complex was built, designed to house the productions of Doctor Who, The Sarah Jane Adventures, Casualty, Upstairs Downstairs, and Pobol y Cwm. Located in Porth Teigr, Cardiff Bay, Roath Lock Studios gained permission in January 2009 and construction began in June 2010 with the building topping out in February 2011. Production began at the site in autumn 2011 and the site was officially opened on 12 March 2012. As a result, Pobol y Cwm moved from the Llandaff studios and Doctor Who moved from Upper Boat studios to the new complex, with Casualty joining them at the site. Despite being designed to house them, the site never housed the Sarah Jane Adventures, following the death of main actress Elisabeth Sladen in 2011, or Upstairs Downstairs, following the series' cancellation.

BBC National Orchestra of Wales operated from a purpose-built orchestra studio, Studio 1, in Broadcasting House from 1966 to 2008. They then moved to new purpose built facilities at BBC Hoddinott Hall in January 2009, as part of the Wales Millennium Centre campus.

=== Broadcasting House, Llandaff ===
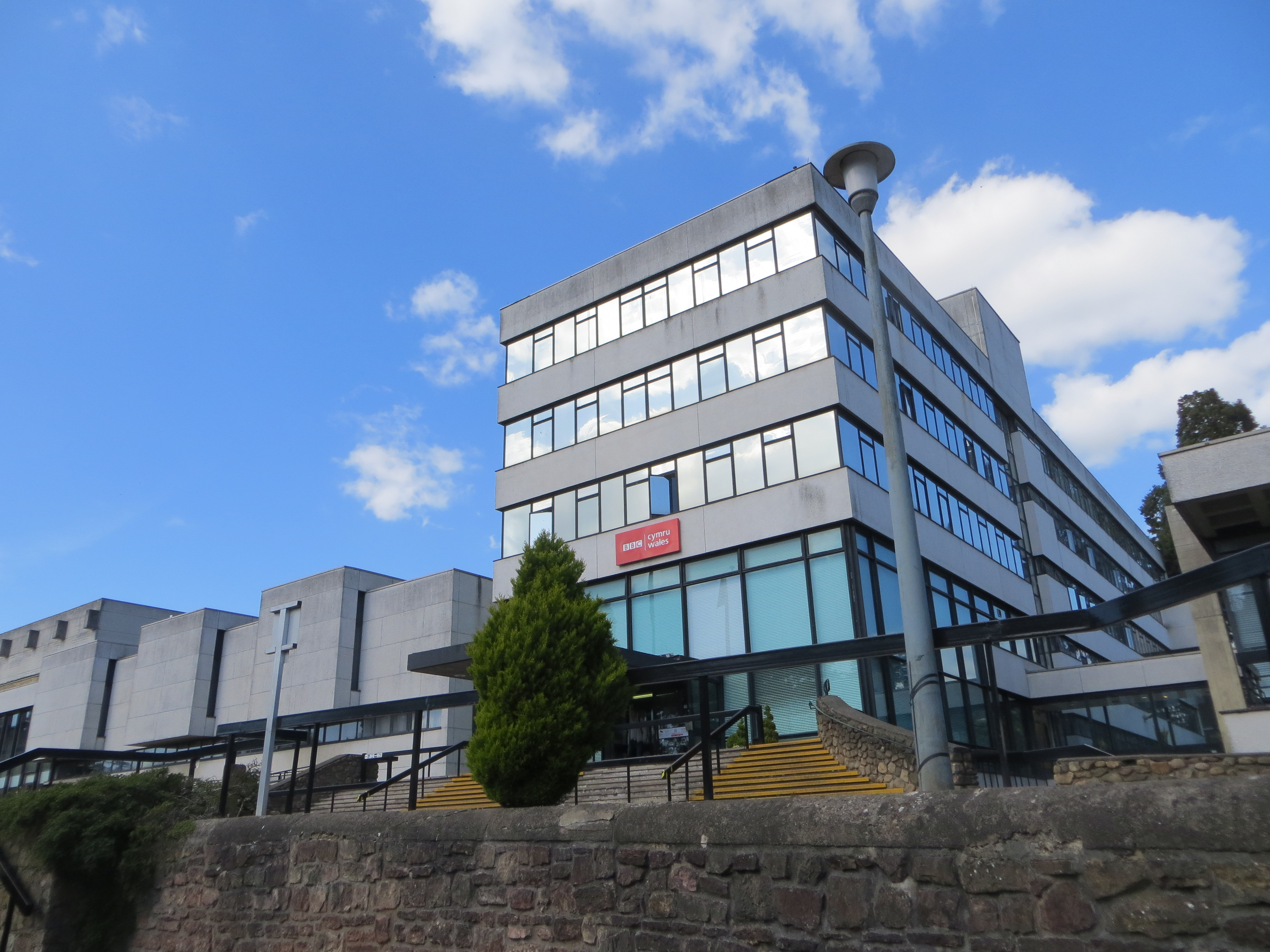
The former Broadcasting House

Until 2020, BBC Cymru Wales's headquarters were at Broadcasting House, Llandaff, Cardiff.

The studio centre was built in 1966 and opened the following year as a purpose-built location to house the expanding presence of the BBC in Cardiff. The centre contained studios for the news programmes, radio space including that used by the BBC National Orchestra of Wales until 2009, and another studio for drama productions constructed in the mid-1970s. It was the first time that all of BBC Cymru Wales's departments within Cardiff were located on one site.

Broadcasting House was built next to Baynton House which housed all of the BBC Wales' operations from 1952 until construction was finished. Baynton House remained in use by the BBC until 1975 when it was demolished to make way for the E-Block extension.

Previously, the BBC in Wales had been located in the converted Broadway Methodist Chapel on Broadway in Roath, Cardiff from 1955, and in nearby premises on Stacey Road in Roath, Cardiff from 1959. A temporary broadcasting centre was set up on the banks of the River Taff, in 1958 to cover the Empire Games. While these studios played host to drama, entertainment and regional programmes, the site was still not ideal. The site only held two studios, both located in the church, and the ability to broadcast film was not installed on the site for several years; film played into programmes from a telecine machine in Bristol or London and film processing for news was carried out by a firm called Park Pictures in Cardiff until BBC processing was installed in Stacey Road.

=== Studios outside of Cardiff ===
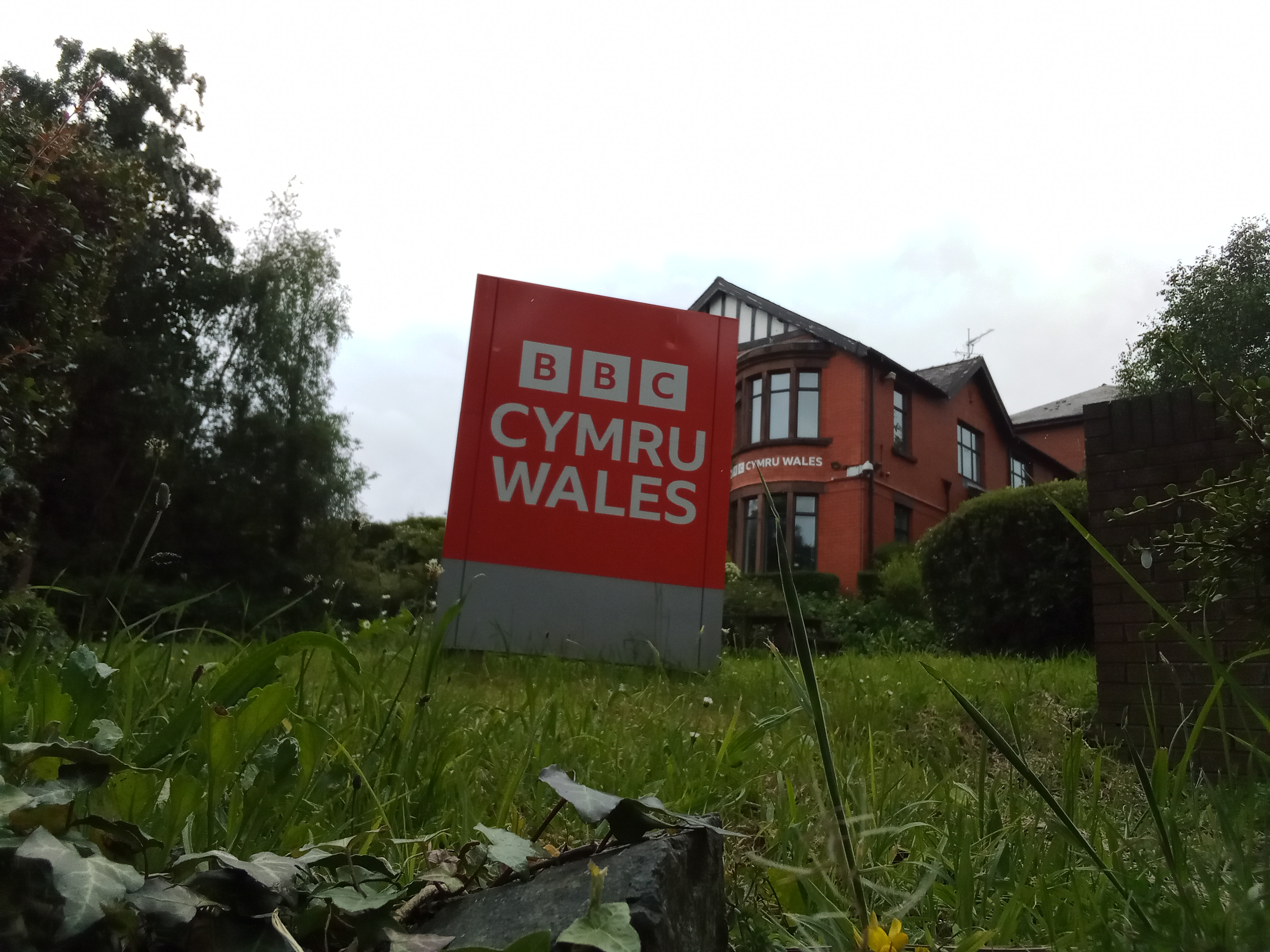
BBC Wales office in Bangor, Wales

BBC Cymru Wales's main studios outside of Cardiff are based in Bangor, Gwynedd, and are home to around 50 staff. Much of BBC Radio Cymru's daytime output is broadcast from here.

Across Wales, there are also a number of properties that the BBC owns are local radio studios. These are primarily used as contributor studios, where interviewees or reporters can join a radio programme from an ISDN line, with the presenter remaining in the main studio in Cardiff or Bangor. These studios are located in Aberystwyth, Carmarthen, Newtown, Penrhyndeudraeth, Swansea and Wrexham.

== Television productions ==
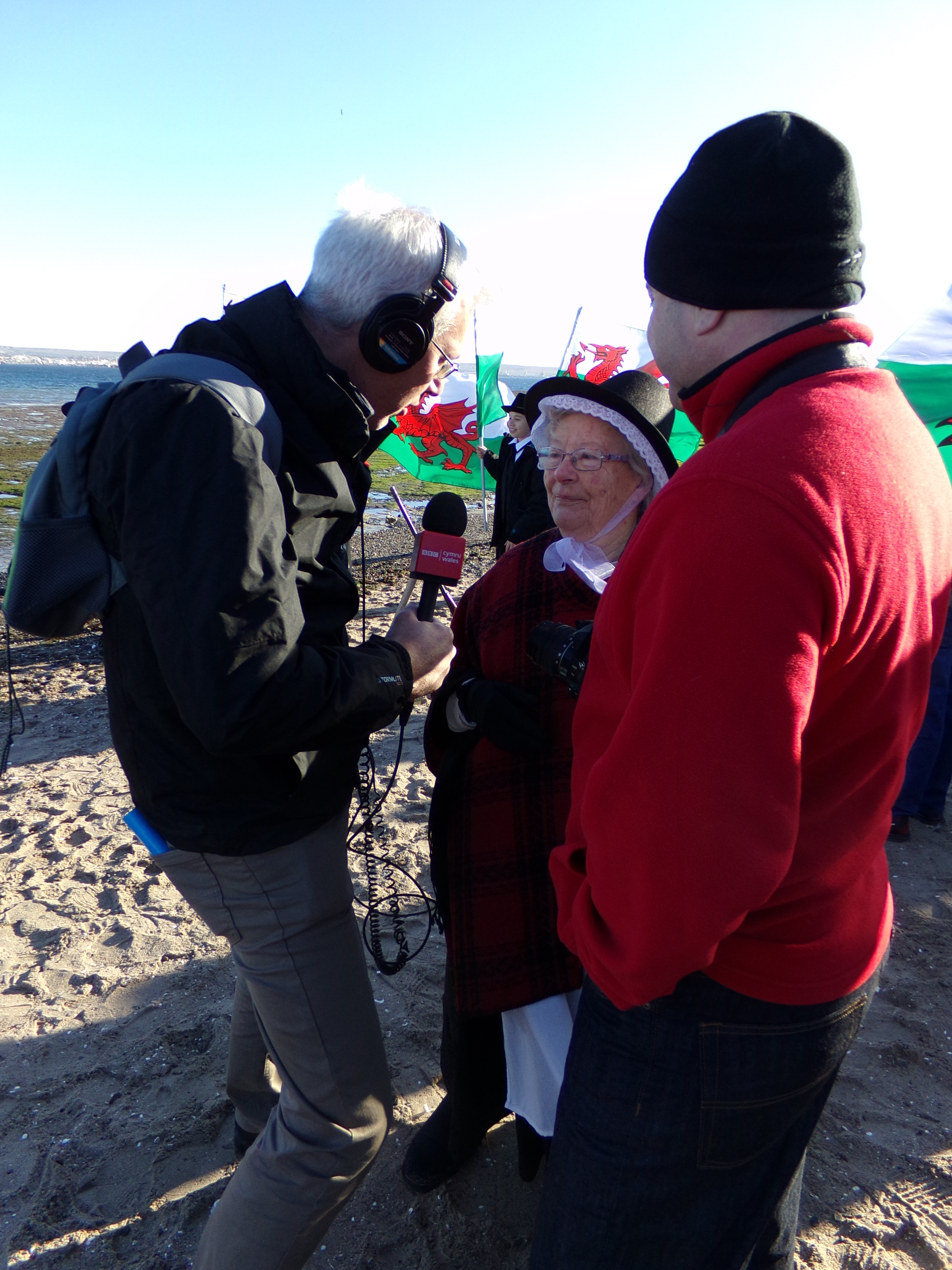
BBC Wales reporter Craig Duggan conducting an interview in Puerto Madryn, Argentina, for the 150th anniversary of Y Wladfa.

BBC Cymru Wales produces local and networked programming for broadcast in Wales and the rest of the UK. In recent years, its drama output has been particularly successful, including the 2005 revival of the classic science fiction series Doctor Who and its spin-offs Torchwood (2006) and The Sarah Jane Adventures (2007). In addition, BBC Wales commissions other drama output for the BBC network from independent producers, such as Life on Mars (2006–2007).

=== In-house productions ===
The following productions were created by BBC Cymru Wales for broadcast in Wales:

- Wales Today (1962–present)
- Pobol y Cwm (1974–present)
- Newyddion (1982–present)
- Scrum V (1995–present)
- Clwb Rygbi (1997–present)
- BBC Wales Live (2019–present)
- Politics Wales (2019–present)
- BBC Wales Investigates

==== Former productions ====
- Satellite City (1996–1999)
- Belonging (1999–2009)
- The Bench (2001–2002)
- First Degree (2002)
- High Hopes (2002–2009)

=== Networked productions ===
In addition to programming for Wales, networked productions from BBC Cymru Wales include:

- Grand Slam (1978)
- The Life and Times of David Lloyd George (1981)
- Ennal's Point (1982)
- The District Nurse (1984–1987)
- Border Cafe
- He Knew He Was Right (2004)
- Doctor Who (2005–2022)
- Doctor Who Confidential (2005–2011)
- The Chatterley Affair (2006)
- Torchwood (2006–2009)
- Torchwood Declassified (2006–2009)
- Tribe (2007)
- The Sarah Jane Adventures (2007–2011)
- Top Dogs (2009)
- Hospital 24/7 (2009–2011)
- Upstairs Downstairs (2010–2012)
- Sarah Jane's Alien Files (2010)
- Wizards vs Aliens (2012–2014)
- Casualty (2012–present)
- Class (2016)
- The Golden Cobra (2024)

=== Independent commissions ===
In addition to the in-house commissions, BBC Wales also commissions other independent companies to produce programmes. These include:

For Wales:

- X-Ray (2001–2023, consumer show)
- Coal House (2007–2008)
- The Wright Taste (2008)
- Crash (2009–2010)

For the UK:

- Shakespeare: The Animated Tales (1992, 1994)
- Casanova (2005)
- The Girl in the Café (2005)
- Life on Mars (2006–2007)
- Wide Sargasso Sea (2006)
- This Life + 10 (2007)
- Ashes to Ashes (2008–2010, spinoff of Life on Mars)
- Merlin (2008–2012)
- Being Human (2009–2013)
- Rhod Gilbert's Work Experience (2009–present)
- Sherlock (2010–2017)
- Dirk Gently (2010 pilot, 2012 series)

== Radio productions ==
- Composer of the Week
