= Digital 3&4 =

British television multiplex consortium

- Type: Limited company
- Industry: Television
- Founded: December 12, 1996; 29 years ago
- Area served: United Kingdom
- Key people: Steve Holebrook (managing director)
- Parent: ITV Network Limited; Channel 4 Television Corporation

Digital 3&4 is the operator of the PSB2 multiplex for digital terrestrial television in the United Kingdom. The company is equally owned by ITV Network Limited and Channel Four Television Corporation. It was established in 1996 to manage the multiplex that ITV and Channel 4 had been each gifted half of by the Independent Television Commission.

Digital 3&4's PSB2 multiplex contains a number of channels and radio services. It must carry ITV (TV network), Channel 4 and, since 2009, Channel 5. Prior to 2010, 3% of the capacity was allocated to Teletext Ltd for interactive services. Digital 3&4 has used the rest of the multiplex's capacity to broadcast other channels from their parent companies or other broadcasters who pay Digital 3&4 a fee. Unlike other multiplexes, the regional ITV broadcaster has control over which services are to be broadcast on their allotted amount of the capacity, leading to small regional differences across the country.

== Channels carried ==
- ITV1 / STV
- ITV1 +1 / STV +1 (except Channel Islands)
- ITV2
- ITV2 +1
- ITV3
- ITV4
- ITV4 +1
- ITV Quiz
- Channel 4
- S4C (Wales only)
- Channel 4 +1
- Film4
- Film4 +1
- More4
- E4
- E4 +1 (except Wales)
- 4seven
- E4 Extra
- 5
- Freeview information page
- Accessible TV guide

== Former channels carried ==
- Teletext
- Quiz Call
- 4Extra
- FourText
- GMTV2
- ITV Sport Channel
- ITV News Channel
- Bloomberg Television
- UK Food
- ITV Text+
- Price Drop.TV
- Heart
- ITVBe
- CITV Channel
- That's Memories
- That's TV 3
- That's 20th Century

== See also ==
- List of DTT channels in the United Kingdom
