= BBC Two Wales =

National variation of BBC Two for BBC Cymru Wales

- Logo used since 2021.
- Country: United Kingdom (Wales)
- Broadcast area: Wales
- Network: BBC Two

Programming
- Picture format: 576i (16:9 SDTV); 1080i (HDTV)

Ownership
- Owner: BBC Cymru Wales
- Sister channels: BBC One Wales; BBC 2W (2001–2009)

History
- Launched: 12 September 1965; 60 years ago 30 March 2001; 25 years ago (digital version)
- Replaced: BBC Choice Wales (digital version)
- Closed: 2 January 2009 (analogue version)
- Former names: BBC2 Wales (12 September 1965 – 16 February 1991); BBC Wales on 2 (16 February 1991 – 4 October 1997)

Links
- Website: www.bbc.co.uk/wales/

Availability

Terrestrial
- Freeview (Wales only): Channel 2 (SD); Channel 102 (HD)

BBC Two Wales is a Welsh free-to-air television channel owned and operated by BBC Cymru Wales as a variation of the BBC Two network. It is broadcast from Central Square in Cardiff with live continuity provided by a team of announcer/directors. The channel opts out from the main BBC Two schedule.

From 5 November 2001 until 2 January 2009, BBC Two Wales was the name of the analogue service broadcasting to Wales, and was the brand used on the digital service outside the broadcasting hours used by BBC 2W. BBC 2W was the sister channel to BBC Two Wales, until the digital switchover saw the end of analogue broadcasts in Wales. The specific BBC 2W service was closed down and the BBC Two Wales brand used.

== History ==
BBC2 had extended its coverage to Wales on 12 September 1965. To mark the occasion, the channel broadcast BBC-2 Comes to Wales to introduce the service, featuring the Secretary of State for Wales James Griffiths, the Lord Mayor of Cardiff, the Deputy Mayor of Newport, Chairman of the Broadcasting Council for Wales Professor Glanmor Williams, BBC2's controller David Attenborough and BBC2 Wales' Alun Oldfield-Davies.

During the plan to introduce a dedicated Welsh-language television channel, which would eventually become S4C, plans were made in 1980 to move BBC Welsh-language programming to BBC2. The BBC thought the idea was unviable, as its schedule was not designed to receive a consistent series of opt-out slots for regions and nations, and the only programme with a fixed starting slot started at 9pm. This meant that there was no set time to leave the opt-out programming and easily rejoin the BBC2 network feed from London. This would also lead to the loss of certain programmes, including sporting events, and a dedicated teatime children's slot would disrupt the sport output the channel had at the time, if available in the timeslot.

== Programming ==
BBC Two Wales logo used from 2007 until 2021.

Programming is much the same as BBC Two, with the exception of some Welsh-oriented programming. Frequently, schedules are changed as a result of an additional programme being inserted and other programmes seen on the BBC Two network being delayed until a slot becomes available.

Presentation is parallel to that of BBC Two itself, with BBC Two Wales sharing the same idents and channel design. The primary addition is the word 'Wales' under the BBC Two logo inside the box.

== Availability ==
BBC Two Wales can be seen both in Wales on all television platforms, usually on Channels 2, or 102 depending on the system, and in other regions of the UK via most satellite providers and on some other digital television providers. Programmes shown exclusively on BBC Two Wales can also be seen again, for 28 days after broadcast on the BBC iPlayer service.

=== BBC Two Wales HD ===
BBC Two Wales was made available in high definition on 29 November 2018 on Freeview (in Wales only), Sky and Freesat, with addition to Virgin Media cable to follow on 4 December. On Freesat HD boxes, BBC Two Wales HD directly replaced the SD version on 102 in Wales and 971 elsewhere; the SD version was relocated to 106 in Wales (the slot previously used for the network BBC Two HD) and 979 elsewhere; viewers in Wales can now access the network version of BBC Two HD on 949. On Freeview HD in Wales, BBC Two Wales HD directly replaced the network version on 102. On Sky, the 'HD swap' facility places BBC Two Wales HD on 102 on HD boxes in Wales, with the SD and network versions further down the guide. Standard-definition receivers saw little change, with BBC Two Wales in SD remaining at 2/102 as before.
