= BBC One Wales =

Television channel

- Logo used since 2021.
- Country: United Kingdom
- Broadcast area: Wales
- Network: BBC One

Programming
- Picture format: 576i (16:9 SDTV); 1080i (16:9 HDTV)

Ownership
- Owner: BBC Cymru Wales
- Sister channels: BBC Two Wales

History
- Launched: 9 February 1964; 62 years ago
- Former names: BBC Cymru Wales (9 February 1964 – 5 September 1981); BBC Wales (6 September 1981 – 17 February 1985); BBC1 Wales (18 February 1985 – 15 February 1991); BBC Wales On 1 (16 February 1991 – 3 October 1997)

Availability

Terrestrial
- Freeview: Channel 1 Channel 101 (HD)

Streaming media
- FilmOn: Watch live (Wales)

BBC One Wales is a Welsh free-to-air television channel owned and operated by BBC Cymru Wales. It is the Welsh variation of the UK-wide BBC One network and is broadcast from Central Square in Cardiff.

== History and operation ==
Former BBC One Wales logo used from 2006 until 2021.

The first television signals in Wales came on 15 August 1952 from the newly constructed Wenvoe transmitter. The transmitter itself broadcast the national BBC Television service. Programming either for Wales or in the Welsh language was initially restricted. In 1956, a newsreel was broadcast at 6pm on the Wenvoe and adjacent Holme Moss and Sutton Coldfield transmitters, Tele-Newyddion, at 6pm, which at the time was during the period of the Toddlers' Truce which restricted television broadcasts between 6 and 7pm. Some of the items included in the bulletin were from a few weeks prior to production and broadcast. Wales would gain some significance when, in 1957, the BBC West region from Bristol was established including a daily five-minute news bulletin for Wales, followed five years later by the launch of the daily magazine programme, Wales Today.

The channel was launched on February 9, 1964 as BBC Cymru Wales. The channel was carried in the Wenvoe transmitter on VHF Band III channel 13 (214.75 MHz). The same transmitter had been carrying BBC West on channel 5 since 1952. In anticipation for the new service, a campaign with the slogan "Wales gets its very own TV service in 1964" aired, displaying the locations of the five transmitters to be used, as well as a minute-long animated information film about how to retune in South Wales, and about the problem of mountains blocking signals, which was being remedied by new transmitters. BBC Wales produced twelve hours per week of regional programming specifically for the new service, five in English and seven in Welsh. The service opted out from network BBC TV (BBC1 from April 1964) at more convenient times, with Welsh-language programming being promoted to new time slots.

From the inception of the new channel until 24-hour broadcasts began in November 1997, the channel played three bars of the Welsh anthem followed by the first bar of the British one at closedown over the channel ident.

In 1966, BBC Cymru Wales' new headquarters at Broadcasting House in Cardiff opened (up until then, BBC Cymru Wales used several buildings in the Cardiff area) and the first colour broadcast for Wales followed in 1970. On 1 July 1969, the investiture of HRH the Prince of Wales was its largest outside coverage to date, with narration by Richard Baker and Emlyn Williams; its coverage amassed an estimated 500 million viewers around the world.

In April 1970, BBC Cymru Wales started 625-line broadcasts on channel 44, starting colour broadcasts on 9 July the same year; the first program being a report on the Llangollen International Eisteddfod. Pobol y Cwm premiered on this channel in October 1974. The 405-line service on channel 13 was shut down two years early, on 4 January 1983.

With the launch of S4C in 1982, and the increase in the number of hours of Welsh-language programming per week from seven to ten as consequence, as well as the move of all Welsh programmes to the new service, the channel was simply renamed BBC Wales. The move was welcomed by English speakers, who had complained about the constant presence of programmes in a language they did not understand for years.

Playout moved to the New Broadcasting House in July 2020, followed weeks later by Wales Today.

BBC One Wales broadcasts around three hours of non-news programmes for Wales each week alongside six hours a week of national news for Wales from BBC Wales Today.

BBC One Wales branding is utilised between 6 am and around 1 am each day with live continuity handled by a team of national announcer/directors.

A high-definition simulcast of BBC One Wales launched on 29 January 2013 on Freeview, Freesat, Sky and Virgin Media. On 10 December 2013, BBC One Wales HD was swapped with the SD channel on Sky's EPG for HD subscribers.
