= Neath Abbey television relay station =

Transmitter station in Wales

Neath Abbey
- Mast height: 12 metres (39 ft)
- Coordinates: 51°40′01″N 3°50′08″W
- Grid reference: SS731980
- Built: 1980s
- Relay of: Kilvey Hill
- BBC region: BBC Wales
- ITV region: ITV Cymru Wales

The Neath Abbey television relay station is sited on a hill north of the town of Neath. It was originally built in the 1980s as a fill-in relay for UHF analogue television serving the parts of the town of Neath to its east with its vertically polarised signal, and the parts of the town to its northwest with its horizontally polarised signal. This is an unusual layout, chosen to avoid signal degradation from reflections off the cliffs to the north. The site consists of a 12 m self-supporting lattice mast standing on land which is itself about 80 m above sea level. The Neath Abbey transmission station is owned and operated by Arqiva.

Neath Abbey transmitter re-radiates the signal received off-air from Kilvey Hill about 10 km to the southwest. When it came, the digital switchover process for Neath Abbey duplicated the timing at the parent station, with the first stage taking place on Wednesday 12 August 2009 and the second stage was completed on Wednesday 9 September 2009, with the Kilvey Hill transmitter-group becoming the first in Wales to complete digital switchover. After the switchover process, analogue channels had ceased broadcasting permanently and the Freeview digital TV services were radiated at an ERP of 10 W each.

== Channels listed by frequency ==
=== Analogue television ===
==== 1980s - 12 August 2009 ====
Neath Abbey (being in Wales) transmitted the S4C variant of Channel 4.

Frequency	UHF	kW		Service
Frequency	UHF	H	V	Service
639.25 MHz	42	0.006	0.008	ITV1 Wales (HTV Wales until 2002)
687.25 MHz	48	0.006	0.008	BBC Two Wales
751.25 MHz	56	0.006	0.008	S4C
831.25 MHz	66	0.006	0.008	BBC One Wales

=== Analogue and digital television ===
==== 12 August 2009 - 9 September 2009 ====
The UK's digital switchover commenced at Kilvey Hill (and therefore at Neath Abbey and all its other relays) on 12 August 2009. Analogue BBC Two Wales on channel 48 was first to close. According to Digital UK ITV1 Wales would take over the vacated BBC Two slot at all relays of Kilvey Hill until the switchover was complete.

On this site this was arguably not strictly necessary as ITV1 Wales' channel was not to be the eventual allocation for the new digital BBC A multiplex. However it is likely that BBC A did temporarily occupy channel 42 for those three weeks, using 64-QAM and running at full power (i.e. 10 W). BBC A could not immediately occupy channel 52 because that frequency was still being used for analogue S4C at Cilfrew, just along the valley.

Frequency	UHF	kW		Service	System
Frequency	UHF	H	V	Service	System
642.000 MHz	42	0.01	0.01	BBC A	DVB-T
687.25 MHz	48	0.006	0.008	ITV1 Wales	PAL System I
751.25 MHz	56	0.006	0.008	S4C	PAL System I
831.25 MHz	66	0.006	0.008	BBC One Wales	PAL System I

=== Digital television ===
==== 9 September 2009 - present ====
The remaining analogue TV services were closed down and the new digital multiplexes took over on two of the original analogue channels' frequencies. Channel 52 was occupied for the first time on this site by the existing digital BBC A mux which was moved from its temporary parking channel. Neath Abbey became a proper "group C/D aerial" site for the first time in its history.

Frequency	UHF	kW		Operator
Frequency	UHF	H	V	Operator
690.000 MHz	48	0.01	0.01	Digital 3&4
722.000 MHz	52	0.01	0.01	BBC A
754.000 MHz	56	0.01	0.01	BBC B
