= Craig-Cefn-Parc television relay station =

Television relay station in Wales

Craig-Cefn-Parc
- Mast height: 17 metres (56 ft)
- Coordinates: 51°42′04″N 3°54′31″W
- Grid reference: SN6811502046
- Built: 1978
- Relay of: Kilvey Hill
- BBC region: BBC Wales
- ITV region: ITV Cymru Wales

The Craig-Cefn-Parc television relay station is sited on Mynydd Gelliwastad to the west of Clydach in the Swansea Valley. It was originally built in 1978 as a fill-in relay for UHF analogue colour television. It consists of a 17 m self-supporting lattice mast standing on land which is itself about 160 m above sea level (and about 90 m above the village of Craig Cefn Parc which it serves). The transmissions are beamed to the northwest to avoid cross-channel interference with the Alltwen transmitter which is about 4 km to the northeast and which uses the same frequencies. The Craig-Cefn-Parc transmitter is owned and operated by Arqiva.

Craig-Cefn-Parc transmitter re-radiates the signal received off-air from Kilvey Hill about 10 km to the south. When it came, the digital switchover process for Craig-Cefn-Parc duplicated the timing at the parent station, with the first stage taking place on Wednesday 12 August 2009 and the second stage was completed on Wednesday 9 September 2009, with the Kilvey Hill transmitter-group becoming the first in Wales to complete digital switchover. After the switchover process, analogue channels had ceased broadcasting permanently and the Freeview digital TV services were radiated at an ERP of 2W each.

== Channels listed by frequency ==
=== Analogue television ===
==== 24 November 1978 - 1 November 1982 ====
Frequency	UHF	kW	Service
623.25 MHz	40	0.006	BBC Two Wales
647.25 MHz	43	0.006	HTV Wales
671.25 MHz	46	0.006	BBC One Wales

==== 1 November 1982 - 12 August 2009 ====
Craig-Cefn-Parc (being in Wales) transmitted the S4C variant of Channel 4.

Frequency	UHF	kW	Service
623.25 MHz	40	0.006	BBC Two Wales
647.25 MHz	43	0.006	ITV1 Wales (HTV Wales until 2002)
671.25 MHz	46	0.006	BBC One Wales
703.25 MHz	50	0.006	S4C

=== Analogue and digital television ===
==== 12 August 2009 - 9 September 2009 ====
The UK's Digital Switchover commenced at Kilvey Hill (and therefore at Craig-Cefn-Parc and all its other relays) on 12 August 2009. Analogue BBC Two Wales on channel 40 was first to close, and ITV Wales was moved from channel 43 to channel 40 for its last month of service. Channel 43 was replaced by the new digital BBC A mux which started up in 64-QAM and at full power (i.e. 2 W).

Frequency	UHF	kW	Service	System
623.25 MHz	40	0.006	ITV1 Wales	PAL System I
650.000 MHz	43	0.002	BBC A	DVB-T
671.25 MHz	46	0.006	BBC One Wales	PAL System I
703.25 MHz	50	0.006	S4C	PAL System I

=== Digital television ===
==== 9 September 2009 - present ====
The remaining analogue TV services were closed down and the digital multiplexes took over on the original analogue channels' frequencies.

Frequency	UHF	kW	Operator
650.000 MHz	43	0.002	BBC A
674.000 MHz	46	0.002	Digital 3&4
706.000 MHz	50	0.002	BBC B

==== 13 March 2013 ====
As a side-effect of frequency-changes elsewhere in the region to do with clearance of the 800 MHz band for 4G mobile phone use, Craig Cefn Parc's "BBC B" multiplex will have to be moved from channel 50 to channel 40.

Frequency	UHF	kW	Operator
626.000 MHz	40	0.002	BBC B
650.000 MHz	43	0.002	BBC A
674.000 MHz	46	0.002	Digital 3&4
