= Pontardawe television relay station =

Pontardawe
- Mast height: 45 metres (148 ft)
- Coordinates: 51°43′05″N 3°50′10″W
- Grid reference: SN732037
- Built: 1975
- Relay of: Kilvey Hill
- BBC region: BBC Wales
- ITV region: ITV Cymru Wales

The Pontardawe television relay station was originally built in 1974/1975 as a relay for UHF analogue television. It consists of a 45 m self-supporting lattice mast standing on a hillside which is itself about 160 m above sea level (about 100 m above the town). Currently, the transmitters cater for most of the digital terrestrial TV subscribers in the towns of Pontardawe and Alltwen and in the nearby villages of that section of the Tawe valley. The transmission station is owned and operated by Arqiva.

When it was built, Pontardawe transmitter re-radiated a signal received off-air from Kilvey Hill about 12 km to the southwest. However, sometime after the Alltwen relay was built on the opposite side of the valley, the Pontardawe mast was reassigned to relay its signal instead. Both sites have line-of-sight to Kilvey Hill, but the direct signal to the Pontardawe site does have a close encounter with a wooded hillside 2 km away which severely intrudes into the signal's First Fresnel Region. Alltwen's line-of-sight is unobstructed.

When it came, the digital switchover process for Pontardawe duplicated the timing at the parent station, with the first stage taking place on Wednesday 12 August 2009 and the second stage was completed on Wednesday 9 September 2009, with the Kilvey Hill transmitter-group becoming the first in Wales to complete digital switchover. After the switchover process, analogue channels had ceased broadcasting permanently and the Freeview digital TV services were radiated at an ERP of 25 W each.

== Channels listed by frequency ==
=== Analogue television ===
==== Early 1975 - 1 November 1982 ====
Pontardawe mast was needed because the signal from Kilvey Hill was unreliable (or unobtainable) for the communities at river level.

Frequency	UHF	kW	Service
767.25 MHz	58	0.05	BBC1 Wales
791.25 MHz	61	0.05	HTV Wales
815.25 MHz	64	0.05	BBC2 Wales

==== 1 November 1982 - 12 August 2009 ====
Channel 4 launched across the UK in 1982. Pontardawe (being in Wales) transmitted the S4C variant. The power levels on all four UHF channels were increased to 125 W.

Frequency	UHF	kW	Service
767.25 MHz	58	0.125	BBC One Wales
791.25 MHz	61	0.125	ITV1 Wales (HTV Wales until 2002)
815.25 MHz	64	0.125	BBC Two Wales
847.25 MHz	68	0.125	S4C

=== Analogue and digital television ===
==== 12 August 2009 - 9 September 2009 ====
The UK's digital switchover commenced at Kilvey Hill (and therefore at Pontardawe and all its other relays) on 12 August 2009. Analogue BBC Two Wales on channel 64 was first to close, and ITV1 Wales was moved from channel 61 to channel 64 for its last month of service. Channel 61 was replaced by the new digital BBC A mux which started up in 64-QAM and at full power (i.e. 25 W).

Frequency	UHF	kW	Service	System
767.25 MHz	58	0.125	BBC One Wales	PAL System I
794.000 MHz	61	0.025	BBC A	DVB-T
815.25 MHz	64	0.125	ITV1 Wales	PAL System I
847.25 MHz	68	0.125	S4C	PAL System I

=== Digital television ===
==== 9 September 2009 - present ====
The remaining analogue TV services were closed down and the digital multiplexes took over the original channel 58 frequency vacated by BBC One Wales and a new allocation of channel 54. This was done as part of the Europe-wide tactic of clearing Band V above 800 MHz so as to make space for future 4G mobile phone services.

Frequency	UHF	kW	Operator
738.000 MHz	54	0.025	BBC B
770.000 MHz	58	0.025	Digital 3&4
794.000 MHz	61	0.025	BBC A

==== Late 2012 or Early 2013 ====
OFCOM have announced that channel 61 is also to be cleared so as to make space for future 4G mobile phone services. At Pontardawe, BBC A will be moved to channel 49.

Frequency	UHF	kW	Operator
698.000 MHz	49	0.002	BBC A
738.000 MHz	54	0.002	BBC B
770.000 MHz	58	0.002	Digital 3&4
