= Alan Cowie =

Scottish television journalist, presenter and producer

Alan Cowie is a senior Scottish television journalist, presenter and producer.

Formerly a drama teacher, Cowie began his broadcasting career as a freelance theatre critic for the BBC Scottish Home Service during the early 1970s. Later, he became the presenter of NorthBeat, a nightly radio news programme from the BBC in Aberdeen.

In 1975, he joined Grampian Television (now STV North) as one of only three journalists based at the station's headquarters in Aberdeen. Over 25 years, he chiefly worked on the station's news and current affairs programmes (News and Views, Grampian Today, North Tonight, Points North, Crossfire) as a reporter, presenter and editor. He also presented and produced a variety of regional programmes for Grampian, mainly specialising in documentaries and current affairs - work which would later take him to a role as Head of Current Affairs for the station.

Cowie stood down from Grampian in 2000 to become a freelance and continues to work at STV North, as an editor for the Northern edition of STV News at Six. He is also a liaison for Digital UK in the North and North East Scotland region.
