= Cilfrew television relay station =

TV relay station in Wales

Cilfrew
- Mast height: 30 metres (98 ft)
- Coordinates: 51°40′24″N 3°46′20″W
- Grid reference: SS775986
- Built: 1981
- Relay of: Kilvey Hill
- BBC region: BBC Wales
- ITV region: ITV Cymru Wales

Cilfrew television relay station is a relay station in the Neath Valley, Wales. It is on a hill by the village of Tonna. It was originally built in 1981 as a fill-in relay for UHF analogue colour television serving the villages of Cilfrew itself, Aberdulais and Tonna. It consists of a 30 m self-supporting lattice mast standing on land which is itself about 80 m above sea level. The transmissions are beamed to the north. The Cilfrew transmission station is owned and operated by Arqiva.

Cilfrew transmitter re-radiates the signal received off-air from Kilvey Hill about 12 km to the southwest. When it came, the digital switchover process for Cilfrew duplicated the timing at the parent station, with the first stage taking place on Wednesday 12 August 2009 and the second stage was completed on Wednesday 9 September 2009, with the Kilvey Hill transmitter-group becoming the first in Wales to complete digital switchover. After the switchover process, analogue channels had ceased broadcasting permanently and the Freeview digital TV services were radiated at an ERP of 3 W each.

== Channels listed by frequency ==
=== Analogue television ===
==== September 1981 - 1 November 1982 ====
Frequency	UHF	kW	Service
615.25 MHz	39	0.015	BBC One Wales
663.25 MHz	45	0.015	BBC Two Wales
695.25 MHz	49	0.015	HTV Wales

==== 1 November 1982 - 12 August 2009 ====
When Channel 4 launched in 1982, Cilfrew (being in Wales) transmitted the S4C variant.

Frequency	UHF	kW	Service
615.25 MHz	39	0.015	BBC One Wales
663.25 MHz	45	0.015	BBC Two Wales
695.25 MHz	49	0.015	ITV1 Wales (HTV Wales until 2002)
719.25 MHz	52	0.015	S4C

=== Analogue and digital television ===
==== 12 August 2009 - 9 September 2009 ====
The UK's digital switchover commenced at Kilvey Hill (and therefore at Cilfrew and all its other relays) on 12 August 2009. Analogue BBC Two Wales on channel 45 was first to close, and ITV Wales was moved from channel 49 to channel 45 for its last month of service. Channel 49 was replaced by the new digital BBC A mux which started up in 64-QAM and at full power (i.e. 3 W).

Frequency	UHF	kW	Service	System
615.25 MHz	39	0.015	BBC One Wales	PAL System I
663.25 MHz	45	0.015	ITV1 Wales	PAL System I
698.000 MHz	49	0.003	BBC A	DVB-T
719.25 MHz	52	0.015	S4C	PAL System I

=== Digital television ===
==== 9 September 2009 - 13 March 2013 ====
The remaining analogue TV services were closed down and the digital multiplexes took over on two of the original analogue channels' frequencies, BBC B being given the new allocation of channel 42.

Frequency	UHF	kW	Operator
642.000 MHz	42	0.003	BBC B
666.000 MHz	45	0.003	Digital 3&4
698.000 MHz	49	0.003	BBC A

==== 13 March 2013 ====
As a side-effect of frequency-changes elsewhere in the region to do with clearance of the 800 MHz band for 4G mobile phone use, Cilfrew's "BBC A" multiplex will have to be moved from channel 49 to channel 39.

Frequency	UHF	kW	Operator
618.000 MHz	39	0.003	BBC A
642.000 MHz	42	0.003	BBC B
666.000 MHz	45	0.003	Digital 3&4
