= Alltwen television relay station =

Television relay station in Swansea Valley, Wales

Alltwen
- Mast height: 17 metres (56 ft)
- Coordinates: 51°43′10″N 3°51′34″W
- Grid reference: SN716039
- Built: 1989
- Relay of: Kilvey Hill
- BBC region: BBC Wales
- ITV region: ITV Cymru Wales

The Alltwen television relay station is sited on a hill to the southwest of Pontardawe in the Swansea Valley, at least a kilometre away from the village of Alltwen from which it takes its name. It was originally built in the late 1980s as a fill-in relay for UHF analogue colour television. It consists of a 17 m self-supporting lattice mast standing on Craig Glyn Meirch, a hillside which is itself about 140 m above sea level (about 90 m above the valley floor). The transmitters are beamed northwards and eastwards to cater for those digital terrestrial TV subscribers in the towns of Pontardawe and Alltwen who for reasons of geography can't get a signal from the much bigger and more powerful Pontardawe transmitter. The Alltwen transmission station is owned and operated by Arqiva.

Alltwen transmitter re-radiates the signal received off-air from Kilvey Hill about 12 km to the southwest. When it came, the digital switchover process for Alltwen duplicated the timing at the parent station, with the first stage taking place on Wednesday 12 August 2009 and the second stage was completed on Wednesday 9 September 2009, with the Kilvey Hill transmitter-group becoming the first in Wales to complete digital switchover. After the switchover process, analogue channels had ceased broadcasting permanently and the Freeview digital TV services were radiated at an ERP of 2 W each.

== Channels listed by frequency ==
=== Analogue television ===
==== 10 March 1989 - 12 August 2009 ====
Alltwen (being in Wales) transmitted the S4C variant of Channel 4.

Frequency	UHF	kW	Service
623.25 MHz	40	0.006	BBC One Wales
647.25 MHz	43	0.006	ITV1 Wales
671.25 MHz	46	0.006	BBC Two Wales
703.25 MHz	50	0.006	S4C

=== Analogue and digital television ===
==== 12 August 2009 - 9 September 2009 ====
The UK's digital switchover commenced at Kilvey Hill (and therefore at Alltwen and all its other relays) on 12 August 2009. Analogue BBC Two Wales on channel 46 was first to close, and ITV Wales was moved from channel 43 to channel 46 for its last month of service. Channel 43 was replaced by the new digital BBC A mux which started up in 64-QAM and at full power (i.e. 2 W).

Frequency	UHF	kW	Service	System
623.25 MHz	40	0.006	BBC One Wales	PAL System I
650.000 MHz	43	0.002	BBC A	DVB-T
671.25 MHz	46	0.006	ITV1 Wales	PAL System I
703.25 MHz	50	0.006	S4C	PAL System I

=== Digital television ===
==== 9 September 2009 - present ====
The remaining analogue TV services were closed down and the digital multiplexes took over on the original analogue channels' frequencies.

Frequency	UHF	kW	Operator
650.000 MHz	43	0.002	BBC A
674.000 MHz	46	0.002	Digital 3&4
706.000 MHz	50	0.002	BBC B

==== 13 March 2013 ====
As a side-effect of frequency-changes elsewhere in the region to do with clearance of the 800 MHz band for 4G mobile phone use, Alltwen's "BBC B" multiplex will have to be moved from channel 50 to channel 40.

Frequency	UHF	kW	Operator
626.000 MHz	40	0.002	BBC B
650.000 MHz	43	0.002	BBC A
674.000 MHz	46	0.002	Digital 3&4
