= High-definition television in the United Kingdom =

High-definition television in the United Kingdom is available via cable, IPTV, satellite and terrestrial television. The first high-definition broadcasts began in late 2005 and since then the number of channels available to view has grown to a maximum of 87 that can be viewed on pay-TV service, Sky.

The majority of channels in the United Kingdom remain broadcast, and largely viewed, in standard-definition, but most major broadcasters have begun or are soon beginning their initial forays into high-definition television. Similarly, the vast majority of viewing still takes place in standard-definition, though penetration of high-definition displays and receivers is increasing.

High-definition broadcasts are available on satellite services: Freesat and Sky; cable services Virgin TV, terrestrial Freeview HD, and IPTV BT TV and Freely.

== Broadcasters ==
=== BBC ===
The BBC initially operated BBC HD on a trial basis on Sky and Telewest (now Virgin Media). Following full approval by the BBC Trust, the service expanded its hours to start at 15:00 and finish at midnight.

On 28 May 2010, the BBC announced that they would launch a simulcast of BBC One in HD to accompany the BBC HD channel, which aimed to show the best BBC programming in high-definition, whereas the new channel was aimed purely at being a HD version of BBC One. BBC One HD launched at 19:00 on 3 November 2010. In July 2011, rumours began to surface about BBC HD being replaced by BBC Two HD. These were originally rejected, but on 6 October 2011 it was confirmed that the BBC planned to replace BBC HD with a single version of BBC Two HD in 2013. BBC Two HD replaced BBC HD on 26 March 2013. Meanwhile, BBC One HD received nations variations for Northern Ireland on 24 October 2012, Scotland on 14 January 2013 and Wales on 29 January 2013.

For the duration of the 2012 Summer Olympics, the BBC operated 24 high-definition channels dedicated to the Olympics on Freesat, Sky and Virgin Media, as well as one channel on Freeview.

On 13 June 2013, the BBC temporarily launched a high-definition red button stream on the Freesat, Freeview and Virgin Media EPGs. A commercial agreement for carriage on Sky was not reached, and the channel was removed from satellite completely on 18 June, with the BBC claiming that it was for "technical reasons". The channel returned to satellite on 24 June after technical work was carried out on Sky's adaptation hub.

On 16 July 2013, the BBC announced they would be launching five new HD channels in 10 December. The proposed channels consisted of HD simulcasts of BBC Three, BBC Four, CBBC, CBeebies and BBC News. The channels would be broadcast on digital terrestrial television and satellite, as well as being offered to cable and IPTV operators.

The BBC stopped offering standard-definition television services on satellite at 10:54 am on 8 January 2024, making BBC services HD-only beyond that time.

=== ITV ===
The ITV network started broadcasting a trial service on Telewest's digital cable television platform, as well as on the digital terrestrial television trial in London during the 2006 Football World Cup. The service ceased after this period, but a new HD service began to be made available with the launch of Freesat, on 7 June 2008, where selected programmes were offered in HD format, and accessed by the red button on Freesat receivers. ITV plc intended to spend £10m during 2008 on supporting ITV HD. This occasional feed was intended for Freesat viewers, and was not listed in the Sky EPG. However, ITV HD could be tuned in manually on Sky HD boxes via the "other channels" section from the "services" menu.

On 12 March 2010, ITV plc announced its intention to launch a full-time ITV1 HD service, available on Freeview, Freesat, Virgin Media, and Sky. The service launched on 2 April at 06:00. STV followed with STV HD on 2 April 2010, available on Freeview, Virgin Media and free-to-air satellite, while UTV launched UTV HD on Virgin Media on 5 October 2010.

ITV2 HD launched on 7 October 2010, followed by ITV3 HD and ITV4 HD on 15 November 2010. These three channels are available, from November 2022, on Freesat and as part of Sky and Virgin Media's subscription packages. ITVBe HD later followed, although it is only available on Virgin Media's subscription package.

=== Channel 4 ===
Channel 4 launched its HD service on digital satellite on 10 December 2007. The channel was encrypted on satellite, available with a free-to-view viewing card but as of April 2011 it is available free-to-air on Freesat. The channel is also available on Freeview and Virgin Media.

On 14 December 2009, Channel 4 launched a second HD channel to Sky customers, E4 HD. The channel is a simulcast of E4, with selected programming in HD. Unlike its standard definition counterpart, E4 HD is a subscription channel, part of Sky's HD pack.

Virgin Media subsequently also announced that it was to carry E4 HD, as well as a further new HD channel, Film4 HD, which would be available exclusively on cable at launch.

For the duration of the 2012 Summer Paralympics, Channel 4 operated three high-definition channels dedicated to the Paralympics on Freesat, Sky and Virgin Media, as well as one channel on Freeview.

On 4 February 2013, More4 HD launched on Sky, with Film4 HD being added on 2 September.

In July 2014, Channel 4 +1 HD and 4seven HD services became available on the Freeview HD platform.

Channel 4's carriage agreements with Sky TV and Virgin Media mean that Film4 HD and E4 HD are exclusive to those providers for the immediate future. However, they may appear on Freeview once those agreements lapse.

On 20 February 2018, Freesat announced that Channel 4HD and On Demand service ALL4 would leave the platform. Channel 4 cited rising EPG costs. S4C HD and Channel 5 HD, however, are still broadcasting on Freesat. Channel 4 HD, Channel 4+1 HD and 4 Seven HD continue to broadcast on Freeview, and Freeview Play retains ALL4.

=== S4C ===
S4C launched an HD service, S4C Clirlun, on 30 April 2010. The service was exclusive to Freeview in Wales and available instead of Channel 4 HD. However, it was announced on 11 July 2012 that, as part of cost-saving measures designed to deal with the impact of cuts to S4C's public funding, Clirlun would close at the end of the year. The channel closed at 11:59 pm on 1 December 2012, allowing Channel 4 HD to begin broadcasting in Wales on Freeview from 2 December 2012.

It was announced on 20 May 2016 that S4C would relaunch a high-definition service S4C HD on Freesat and Sky in Wales and across the UK from 7 June onwards.

=== Channel 5 ===
Channel 5 was awarded a licence for HD transmissions on Freeview from 2010, but due to Channel 5 being unable to resolve certain key criteria, the capacity was handed back to the BBC. Five HD launched on Sky and Virgin Media platforms on 13 July 2010. The channel is free-to-view on satellite.

In 2011, Channel 5 HD was the sole applicant for a fifth high-definition channel slot on Freeview, with the aim of launching in spring or early summer 2012. On 15 December 2011, Channel 5 dropped its bid to take the fifth slot, after being unable to resolve "issues of commercial importance". However, Channel 5 HD began broadcasting in HD on both Freesat and Freeview, after the BBC removed BBC Three / BBC iii from all digital TV platforms (apart from its on-line BBC iPlayer service).

=== UKTV ===
UKTV broadcasts its channels in HD, under the names of U&Eden, U&Dave, U&W, U&Alibi, U&Gold, U&Drama and U&Yesterday. The channels broadcast on Sky and Virgin Media.

=== Sky UK ===
Sky began HD transmissions of several channels in May 2006.

== Platforms ==
=== Terrestrial ===
==== Freeview ====
In March 2009, the Digital TV Group published the technical specification for high definition services on digital terrestrial television (DTT), contributing to the launch of three HD channels on the Freeview platform in early 2010.

The technical launch of Freeview HD took place on 3 December 2009, when the service began broadcasting on UHF channel 54 from the Winter Hill transmitting station in Chorley, Lancashire, and on UHF channel 31 from the Crystal Palace transmitting station in Bromley, Greater London. These broadcasts form the Freeview HD service which requires new reception equipment, available since the consumer launch in early 2010. The service was rolled out on a region by region basis across the UK in accordance with the digital switchover programme. An advanced retrofit programme has been introduced to bring Freeview HD coverage to major cities such as London and Birmingham before they switch to digital television.

The broadcasts make use of a single multiplex currently allowing four channels, BBC One HD, BBC Two HD, ITV HD/STV HD/UTV HD and Channel 4 HD. A fifth slot is available, with Channel 5 withdrawing from the opportunity to broadcast on it on two separate occasions; it has, however, been temporarily used by both the BBC and Channel 4.

Between 22 and 23 March 2011, an encoder software change allowed the Freeview version of BBC HD to automatically detect progressive material and change encoding mode appropriately, meaning the channel could switch to 1080p25. This was extended to all of the other Freeview HD channels in October 2011.

In November 2012, Ofcom backed a proposal from Arqiva, the BBC and Channel 4 to introduce two temporary multiplexes in the 600 MHz spectrum. The proposal would allow for up to ten HD channels, encouraging the take-up of Freeview HD equipment. On 6 February 2013, Ofcom agreed to the proposals, offering multiplexed licenses to operate until 2026, with a minimum term running until 31 December 2018. Channel 4+1HD and 4Seven HD are also available on Freeview.

=== Satellite ===
==== Sky ====
===== Subscription =====
Sky has been carrying HD channels since May 2006. As of 2012 it has over sixty HD channels, a mix of basic and premium subscription, free-to-air and free-to-view services.

HD broadcasts are received using the Sky+ HD service or a Sky HD receiver. A selection of HD push-video on demand content is also available through Sky Anytime on Sky+ HD receivers.

===== Free-to-view (Freesat from Sky) =====
Free-to-air and free-to-view channels may also be viewed through Freesat from Sky. Channel 5 HD was available free-to-view on the service until October 2013, when the channel became subscription only.

==== Freesat ====
Freesat launched on 6 May 2008. It provides a subscription-free alternative to Sky, and includes support for HD with a selection of HD channels available via a Freesat HD box.

Freesat is a not-for-profit company formed by the BBC and ITV, marketing itself as being completely free from subscription charges or contracts, although viewers are still obliged to pay the television licence, and must purchase a suitable satellite receiver and have a satellite dish installed (if they do not already have one) to receive the service. Freesat receivers are available in both standard definition and high definition versions. HD channels are available only when the satellite receiver is capable of supporting it.

==== Free-to-air ====
BBC One HD, BBC Two HD, BBC Four HD, CBBC HD, CBeebies HD, BBC News HD, Channel 4 HD, ITV1 HD, ITV2 HD, ITV3 HD, ITV4 HD, STV HD, UTV HD, Smithsonian HD, and NHK World HD are available unencrypted and without subscription on digital satellite, and may be received by anybody with suitable equipment – a high-definition satellite receiver and a satellite dish. Channel 4 HD was pulled from Freesat on 22 February 2018 along with its ALL4 on demand service. These are still available on Freeview however.

=== Cable ===
==== Virgin Media ====
Virgin TV's V+ cable service was the first HD service in the UK when it was launched by Telewest as the TVDrive on 1 December 2005. From its launch, it carried two channels, but after the completion of ITV's HD trial, it only carried the BBC HD channel, alongside on demand content from several broadcasters. However, from 2009 the number of HD channels steadily increased, which, as of 2012, stands at over thirty HD channels.

On 16 March 2010, Virgin announced that from 22 March they would offer a V HD Box, with no additional monthly subscription fee. They were joined by TiVo from December 2010.

==== Smallworld Cable ====
Smallworld Cable began offering a selection of HD channels in April 2011 through their Smallworld HD+ service.

=== Other ===
BT Vision, a hybrid digital terrestrial and IPTV service, augments standard definition broadcast channels with on-demand pay-per-view high-definition programmes, which the viewer downloads to the V-box set-top-box then watches when the download is complete. The HD service launched in February 2009.

Similarly, TalkTalk TV carries pay-per-view high-definition programmes, which the viewer downloads to the TalkTalk+ set-top-box then watches when the download is complete. The first HD content was added on 7 December 2009.

== See also ==
- HDTV
- Test Channel 6
