= D-book =

The D-Book is the UK technical specification for digital terrestrial television (DTT).

The Digital TV Group (DTG) has published and maintained the D-Book for over a decade and the specification is updated annually to keep up with the pace of development in UK DTT. The D-Book is compiled by DTG Working Groups composed of industry experts from the DTG’s staff and membership of around 150 broadcasters, manufacturers, technology providers and other organisations who continually update and peer-review the specification. Conformance to D-Book standard allows products to use the Digital Tick, Freeview, Freeview + and Freeview HDlogos.

The D-Book is only available to members of the Digital TV Group.

== History ==
The first edition of the D-Book was written in 1996 when the current standard for terrestrial broadcasting DVB-T was new and untried. From the outset, the D-Book was an implementation guideline and referenced fundamental standards where possible. But many of the component parts of the document had not then achieved stable international standards and the UK implementation was therefore reproduced in full.

In subsequent editions, it has become possible to reference ETSI or other standards and the previous D-Book section simplified. However, the D-Book as an implementation guideline has become more important as non-UK based manufacturers have sought to introduce products to the UK market.

== D-Book 6 ==
In March 2009, the DTG published the 6th edition of the D-Book – enabling the launch of an initial three free-to-air HD channels on Freeview by late 2009, as well as the introduction of a broadband return path which has the potential to be used for streaming on-demand video content such as BBC iPlayer, ITV Player and 4oD, accessing e-government services and allowing viewers to complete transactions via their television. It also introduces DVB-T2, the new modulation scheme that is being used in the UK to deliver these services.

== D-Book 7 ==
In March 2011, the DTG published the 7th edition of the D-Book: the book detailed interoperability specifications for UK digital terrestrial television with extended Connected TV functionality. D-Book 7 provides the baseline specification that service providers such as Sky, Virgin Media and YouView can build on for trademark requirements to support their services.

== DTG Testing ==
The industry's test centre: DTG Testing tests digital TV products applying for the Digital Tick, Freeview and Freeview HD logos against the D-Book standard. Many manufacturers, both small and large, have discovered the advantage of revealing problems at this stage, rather than when they have large numbers of products in the shops or in people's homes.

The Freeview HD trademark requirements state that any manufacturer wishing to use the Freeview HD logo on a product must pass the required DTG Testing Freeview HD tests.
