= Public service broadcasting in the United Kingdom =

United Kingdom public service broadcast television networks

1. BBC One
2. BBC Two
3. Channel 3 (ITV1; and STV, in Northern and Central Scotland)
4. Channel 4/S4C (Wales)
5. 5
- Also all other BBC Television channels; for radio, only the BBC stations are public service broadcasters, with BBC Radio 4 being the main news provider

In the United Kingdom, the term public service broadcasting (PSB) refers to broadcasting intended for public benefit rather than to serve purely commercial interests. The communications regulator Ofcom requires that certain television and radio broadcasters fulfil certain requirements as part of their license to broadcast. All of the television and radio stations have a public service remit, including those that broadcast digitally, but not all are designated public service broadcasters.

== History ==
The BBC, whose broadcasting in the UK is funded by a licence fee and does not sell advertising time, is most notable for being the first public service broadcaster in the UK. Its first director general, Lord Reith introduced many of the concepts that would later define public service broadcasting in the UK when he adopted the mission to "inform, educate and entertain".

With the launch of the first commercial broadcaster ITV in 1955, the government required that the local franchises fulfilled a similar obligation, mandating a certain level of local news coverage, arts and religious programming, in return for the right to broadcast.

The next commercial television broadcasters in the UK, the state-owned Channel 4 and S4C, were set up by the government in 1981 to provide different forms of public broadcasting. Channel 4 was required to be a public service alternative to the BBC and to cater for minorities and arts. S4C was to be a mainly Welsh language programmer. Neither was required to be commercially successful as Channel 4 was subsidised by the ITV network and S4C received a grant from the central government. However, Channel 4 was later restructured under the Broadcasting Act 1990 to be a state owned corporation that is self-financing and from 2013, the BBC took over funding for S4C.

When the final analogue terrestrial broadcaster, Channel 5, was launched in 1997, it too was given a number of public service requirements. These included the obligation to provide minimum amounts of programming from various genres, minimum amounts of programming originally commissioned by the channel and of European origin, and maximum limits on the number of repeats.

== Future viability ==
The advent of digital age has brought about many questions about the future of public service broadcasting in the UK. The BBC has been criticised by some for being expansionist and exceeding its public service remit by providing content that could be provided by commercial broadcasters. They argue that the BBC can distort the market, making it difficult for commercial providers to operate. A notable example of this is the Internet services provided by the BBC.

However, those who defend the BBC suggest that the BBC needs to provide new services and entertainment, to remain relevant in the digital age .

ITV has been attempting to significantly reduce its obligations to produce and broadcast unprofitable public service programming, citing the increased competition from digital and multichannel television. Similarly, Channel 4 has projected a £100m funding gap if it is to continue with public service broadcasting after digital switch-over. As of 2005, Ofcom had been consulting on what direction public service broadcasting should take in the future.

== See also ==
- BBC
- Channel 4
- 5 (British TV channel)
- ITV (TV network)
- S4C
- Television licensing in the United Kingdom
