= Analogue terrestrial television in the United Kingdom =

Analogue terrestrial television was originally the method by which the significant majority of viewers in the United Kingdom, the Channel Islands and the Isle of Man received television. Analogue terrestrial television broadcasts have fully ceased in the UK; Northern Ireland was the last region to switch off analogue signals, in the early hours of 24 October 2012, making all of the United Kingdom only capable of receiving digital television. It has been completely replaced by digital terrestrial television and other non-terrestrial means as of the end of 2012.

== Channels available ==
The following channels, all of which are free-to-air, were available on a national basis and continue to be available via digital terrestrial television:

- BBC One
- BBC Two
- ITV (made up of a number of regional franchises, branded "ITV1" or "STV")
- Channel 4 (S4C in Wales before analogue services closed there on 31 March 2010.)
- 5

Prior to the cessation of analogue services, the first four services were available to 99% of households, with the more recent Channel 5 available to around 70%. There were additionally a number of smaller local channels available in particular areas, such as Channel M, which was available in Manchester and Six TV available in Oxford, Southampton, Reading and Portsmouth.

ITV, BBC One and BBC Two carried regional programmes, such as local news, and continue to do so digitally; although digital switchover saw the end of the regionalised BBC Two service in England. The ITV Network is made up of a number of regional operators, though a series of consolidations it all being owned by ITV plc, bar two, owned by STV Group plc.

== Additional services ==
All channels carried at least one teletext service. This included subtitles for many programmes.

== Broadcasters ==
The terrestrial analogue services themselves were in most cases unique when compared to most non-analogue broadcast services (such as those available via digital satellite), in that they are much older, contain a much more diverse range of programming, rather than centring on a specific genre (all five major stations carry news bulletins, for example) and all hold some form of public service requirement in terms of their output.

=== BBC ===
The BBC (British Broadcasting Corporation) began a regular television service, one of the first in the world, in 1936 as the BBC Television Service, funded to this day by a yearly mandatory licence fee. From 1964 the BBC provided two analogue television services, BBC One and BBC Two. Both services carried a wide variety of content as well as regional variations in programming and sometimes continuity. Latterly the BBC Two variations have been limited to England, Northern Ireland, Scotland and Wales. For many years, BBC One in Wales was effectively a separate service, BBC Wales, though many programmes were common to both it and BBC One proper.

=== ITV ===
ITV (Independent Television) was established in 1954, providing the first commercial alternative to the BBC. Programmes would be funded through the 'selling' of air-time for the playing of advertisements; the broadcasters, the first of which began broadcasting in 1955, would be privately owned.

An Independent Television Authority (ITA), (superseded by the Independent Broadcasting Authority (IBA), Independent Television Commission (ITC) and latterly Ofcom) would choose the companies licensed to broadcast on a periodic basis. Each company would be (and nominally still is) afforded a 'franchise' to broadcast to a specific coverage area of the UK, with larger areas sometimes having two broadcasters 'time-sharing' a channel between weekdays and weekends. A separate nationwide 'breakfast' franchise also began in 1983.

Most viewers would only receive one service (unless they happened to receive signals from two transmitters in different areas). Each regional 'franchisee' would broadcast a combination of unique regional programmes and shared 'networked' content aired nationwide; the latter practice becoming ever more commonplace throughout the network's history. Originally each company would broadcast with their own, unique station name, such as "Yorkshire Television" or "Associated-Rediffusion"; with separate continuity announcers and on-screen presentation. It was not until the late 1980s that popular use of the name "ITV" was used as a major on-screen brand, a practice which did not become universal in the ITV plc owned regions until the early 2000s.

ITV was established as a public service broadcaster with various requirements placed upon it affecting the nature of broadcast content, mandatory programming, daily limits on broadcast hours, strict controls on advertising practices and the process by which franchises were awarded.

Various relaxations on these requirements and restrictions were made throughout its history, with a substantial set of deregulation taking place upon the implementation of the Broadcasting Act 1990. Lifting of ownership restrictions resulting from this act and subsequent acts resulted in a single ITV plc owning and operating the majority of franchises by the early 2000s, with a common identity as ITV1 ("UTV" is used for local programmes in Northern Ireland). Two exceptions remain; STV Group plc, owns two franchises in Scotland broadcasting as STV in the North and Central Scotland.

Other relaxations have substantially reduced the requirement for ITV to air particular types of programmes, though requirements such as local and national news provision remain.

The 1990 act formally introduced the legal title of 'Channel 3', though this has rarely been used on-screen.

For many years, the ITA, IBA and the ITV companies campaigned for further frequencies on which to broadcast, though these goals were never wholly realised on analogue.

=== Channel 4 and S4C ===
After many decades of demand by the commercial broadcasters for a second commercial station or network of stations, Channel 4 and S4C were launched in 1982. Channel 4 was originally run as a uniform national service, by the IBA through a subsidiary, the Channel Four Broadcasting Company. Channel 4 does not make the programmes it broadcasts; content is commissioned from independent, private production companies such as the ITV companies and companies not related to ITV who had previously little space to broadcast in the UK. Channel 4 was originally funded by allowing each local ITV franchisee to sell adverts during the station's airtime in their area in exchange for a guaranteed income to be paid to the IBA. The station was established with the intention to provide programmes for minority groups and cater for specialist interests and has a remit that details these obligations.

Since the abolition of the IBA, which took effect in 1993, Channel 4 has been run by the publicly owned, Channel Four Television Corporation and manages its own advertising.

S4C (Welsh: Sianel Pedwar Cymru; Channel 4 Wales) began broadcasts the day before Channel 4 after demands for a dedicated Welsh-language service for Wales. Previously ITV and the BBC were obliged to air Welsh language programmes, though these were often shown at off-peak times. S4C broadcast in place of Channel 4 which would never be available in Wales via analogue terrestrial; consequently some Channel 4 programmes were aired during off-peak times on S4C. Digital platforms in Wales provide both services; S4C's digital variant airing Welsh-language content only.

S4C is operated by the S4C Authority, independent of the IBA and latterly Ofcom and is funded through advertising and direct government funding. The BBC also airs its Welsh language programmes on the service, funded by the licence fee. S4C ceased broadcasting on analogue at the end of March 2010, when the last analogue television transmissions in Wales ended.

=== Channel 5 ===
A fifth service was licensed during the 1990s and began broadcasts in 1997, called Channel 5, it has since been re-branded as Five and later back to Channel 5 in August 2010.

The Channel 5 licence has one single licensee and provides a nationwide service. Compared to the other analogue broadcasters, it has relatively few public-service obligations, provision of news programming being one exception. Limited space within the analogue television bands meant Channel 5 had substantially reduced coverage compared to the other networks, at around 70% coverage.

=== Restricted service licences ===
In addition to the five national networks, a limited number of local stations were broadcast to various towns and cities under what was known as a restricted television service licence. These occupied channels unused by the other broadcasters that could be used without causing interference in other regions, and were frequently broadcast at a lower power than the major channels. Their output was mainly local, and each contract for an RSL lasted four years until 2004 when media regulator Ofcom stated that each licence will be renewed up until digital switchover.

== Broadcasting technology ==
=== 405-line system ===
System A 405 lines on Band I (Ch 1–5) and Band III (6–13)
Ch	Video (MHz)	Audio (MHz)
B1	45.00	41.50
B2	51.75	48.25
B3	56.75	53.25
B4	61.75	58.25
B5	66.75	63.25
B6	179.75	176.25
B7	184.75	181.25
B8	189.75	186.25
B9	194.75	191.25
B10	199.75	196.25
B11	204.75	201.25
B12	209.75	206.25
B13	214.75	211.25

Television broadcasting began on an experimental basis by the BBC in London in 1936 on VHF Band I. Initially the service was operated using two competing systems:

The earliest television broadcasts used the 240-line Baird system and the 405-line Marconi-EMI system on alternate weeks. However, the Baird system proved too cumbersome and by early 1937 had been dropped and the Marconi-EMI system became the standard. This system was later codified by the ITU's CCIR (now ITU-R) on an international conference in Stockholm in 1961 as System A.

Different broadcast stations across the country were broadcast on different channels to avoid interference and allow for regional variations.

Broadcast was suspended during the Second World War but resumed in 1946. The BBC was joined on this system in 1955 with the launch of commercial television in the form of the regional Independent Television (ITV) network, managed by the Independent Television Authority (ITA), which also saw the use of VHF Band III.

This was the sole system in existence until the preparations for the introduction of 625-line transmission in 1964 and was put out of use at the start of 1985.

=== 625-line system ===
System I 625 lines (Bands IV and V) *not in use until later date
Ch	Video (MHz)	Audio (MHz)
E21	471.25	477.25
E22	479.25	485.25
E23	487.25	493.25
E24	495.25	501.25
E25	503.25	509.25
E26	511.25	517.25
E27	519.25	525.25
E28	527.25	533.25
E29	535.25	541.25
E30	543.25	549.25
E31	551.25	557.25
E32	559.25	565.25
E33	567.25	573.25
E34	575.25	581.25
E35*	583.25	589.25
E36*	591.25	597.25
E37*	599.25	605.25
E38*	607.25	613.25
E39	615.25	621.25
E40	623.25	629.25
E41	631.25	637.25
E42	639.25	645.25
E43	647.25	653.25
E44	655.25	661.25
E45	663.25	669.25
E46	671.25	677.25
E47	679.25	685.25
E48	687.25	693.25
E49	695.25	701.25
E50	703.25	709.25
E51	711.25	717.25
E52	719.25	725.25
E53	727.25	733.25
E54	735.25	741.25
E55	743.25	749.25
E56	751.25	757.25
E57	759.25	765.25
E58	767.25	773.25
E59	775.25	781.25
E60	783.25	789.25
E61	791.25	797.25
E62	799.25	805.25
E63	807.25	813.25
E64	815.25	821.25
E65	823.25	829.25
E66	831.25	837.25
E67	839.25	845.25
E68	847.25	853.25

1964 saw the launch of a third television service, known as BBC2, and with it the introduction of the 625–line service on UHF Bands IV and V. Whilst the extra lines theoretically offered better resolution and picture clarity, the fledgling network of new transmitters required to provide the service offered far inferior coverage compared with the existing VHF services and was prone to increased interference often resulting in poor picture quality. Furthermore, few people had the new sets required to receive the new service or the different type of aerial required to pick up the UHF signal.

==== Colour ====
During the late 1950s, when the decision to introduce colour television was first seriously mooted, the then two main systems for consideration were the French SECAM and American NTSC systems, the latter generally considered superior and expected to be adopted. Throughout the 1960s a third competing system, PAL, became available and was eventually adopted by the GPO for use on the 625–line service, to be known as System I or PAL-I.

Broadcast on this system officially commenced in 1967 with BBC2's (and the UK's) launch of colour television programming, though previous years had seen many unofficial colour test films outside of official broadcasting hours, including some which trialled NTSC and SECAM. BBC2 was joined in 1969 by BBC1 and the main ITV franchises (the rest following in stages into the 1970s). Both BBC1 and ITV continued to broadcast simultaneously on the VHF system A until 1985.

==== NICAM-728 Digital stereo ====
Without affecting the definition of the "PAL-I" system, the UK also used a digital stereo companding system on analogue terrestrial television called NICAM. Standing for Near Instantaneous Companded Audio Multiplex and used for digital stereo TV broadcasts to the public, it used the NICAM digital audio system used since the early 1970s for transmitting the audio carrier signal of a broadcast between two or more regional broadcasters and sometimes to the transmitters, where it was converted back to an analogue FM audio carrier 6 MHz above the video carrier signal.

Reception of the NICAM signal provided the user had a VCR or a TV capable of decoding the NICAM signal, which was broadcast on a carrier 6.552 MHz above the video carrier, and thus just 0.552 MHz above the FM mono audio carrier. The first UK NICAM stereo broadcast was made in May 1986 on BBC2, NICAM slowly being rolled out across the UK and across the broadcaster's programme schedules over the next 5 years, culminating in the official launch of NICAM on the BBC in 1991, ITV and Channel 4 having begun broadcasting NICAM in 1989 and 1990 respectively.

The service was sometimes referred to by its full, official, name, NICAM-728 – the 728 denoting the datarate of the digital stereo information – the datarate was 728 kbit/s, non-PCM.

==== Channel allocations ====
The 625–line system divided the spectrum into 44 channels, 21–34 and 39–68 (Bands IV and V). These channels were allocated, by the GPO, to the broadcasters to allow for four networks to operate with eventual maximum coverage and minimum cross-network interference. The two BBC channels and the ITV network were catered for, as well as space for a future fourth network, at the time expected to be a second network for the ITA. The fourth network didn't come into being until the Broadcasting Act 1980 created Channel 4 and S4C. This early provision meant that near complete coverage was afforded to both networks at launch, in 1982.

When Channel 5 launched in 1997 it was allocated UHF channels which were in use by many domestic VCRs, requiring a massive equipment retuning exercise to be undertaken at the broadcaster's expense. Additionally, lack of compatibility with older antennas, plus existing use of the channels by stations in France, meant that Channel 5 never acquired the level of analogue coverage enjoyed by the other broadcasters.

== Digital switch-over ==
The government was committed to switching terrestrial television broadcasting to fully digital by 2012. The digital network features six multiplexes at each of the 80 main nodes, at other nodes there are only three multiplexes because fewer broadcasters were interested in the less densely populated regions. A company called Digital UK (now Everyone TV) was set up to handle the change. The switch was on a region by region basis using the ITV regions as a basis. The schedule was announced by Secretary of State for Culture, Media and Sport, Tessa Jowell on 15 September, 2005.

Some concern had been raised that the London region would be switched shortly before the city hosts the Olympic Games. Jowell said "I can assure you that I did not slog for two years to bring the games here just to see Londoners reduced to huddling round the wireless to find out who won the hundred metres, I am completely confident that our timetable is a sensible one which will ensure that digital services are delivered with no disruption to the viewing public during the Games themselves."

It was also announced that a support scheme would be put in place to ensure that no one is left behind in the switch. It provided help with equipment and installation and follow-up support for people aged 75 years and over and people with significant disabilities. The scheme was funded by the BBC through the licence fee.

The final region to switch off was Northern Ireland, on 23 October 2012. To dedicate the permanent switching-off of analogue in Northern Ireland, and, by extension, the United Kingdom, BBC One (only Northern Irish variation) and UTV together aired "The Magic Box", a programme dedicated to analogue TV: it became the last programme broadcast in analogue in the United Kingdom.
