= Digital Switchover Help Scheme =

The Switchover Help Scheme was part of the digital television switchover process in the United Kingdom. Funded by an increase in the TV licence fee, and administered by the BBC on behalf of the Department for Culture, Media and Sport, it aimed to ensure that up to 7 million households meeting its eligibility criteria would continue to be able to receive television broadcasts after analogue transmissions had been switched off. The service was scheduled to run until March 2013 after which no more households could apply, however the switchover process was completed on 23 October 2012 with the ceasing of analogue TV broadcasts in Northern Ireland.

== Eligibility criteria ==
The scheme was open to all households in which (between eight months before and one month after analogue switch-off at the relevant transmitter) one or more residents were at least 75 years old, or received a Disability Living Allowance or Attendance Allowance, or one or more residents were registered as blind or partially sighted. Also, all residents who had lived in a care home for at least 6 months were automatically eligible.

== Cost ==
If the eligible person (or the person's partner) also received income-related benefits or pension credit, the scheme was free of charge for the standard option. All other recipients had to pay a flat fee of £40.

== Procedure ==
The scheme provided, in essence, whatever it took to get an appropriate digital television service into the household, by the most cost-effective method. For most households this was a set-top box for digital terrestrial TV; the models supplied had to meet certain core requirements beyond what is seen on standard digital boxes, most notably the provision of Audio description. The remote controls provided had also to meet requirements for ease of use. The scheme also provided any help that was required to get the equipment running, including user training and, if necessary, replacement of the aerial system.

Householders who preferred to replace an analogue TV set completely, with a digital TV, or wanted a box which included a digital TV recording facility, could obtain these at discount prices. Householders who chose not to receive digital terrestrial TV could opt for a discount on the cost of a subscription-based TV service (satellite or cable) – or off the cost of a Freesat installation.

== Whitehaven trial ==
It has been reported that in the Whitehaven area, the first non-voluntary conversion from analogue to digital television, take-up of the help scheme has been surprisingly low. This may be partly due to the high percentage of homes already receiving satellite TV in the absence, before switchover, of any Freeview transmissions. Additionally, many householders who met the age criteria but had no special needs did not require the enhanced set-top box, or a replacement aerial (most of the population lives within a few kilometres of the transmitter) and therefore had no reason to pay the £40 flat fee.

== Helping Hand Campaign ==
The Helping Hand Campaign urged people to tell those aged over 75 and disabled people about the special assistance available for switching from analogue to digital television.
