= Freely =

British IPTV platform

- Industry: IPTV
- Headquarters: United Kingdom
- Products: Free-to-air television and video on demand
- Owner: Everyone TV
- Website: freely.co.uk

Freely is a British free-to-air IPTV service launched in 2024 by Everyone TV, a joint venture between the country's public broadcasters BBC, ITV, Channel 4 and 5. The service offers the ability to watch live television and on demand media from the main broadcasters while seamlessly switching between them in a unified schedule-driven electronic programme guide (EPG) or catalogue-driven Browse menu.

Freely streams television over a broadband internet connection and therefore does not require a television aerial, although an aerial can be additionally used to create a hybrid platform and allow the viewing of DTT channels not yet available on Freely. The service proclaimed it will gradually replace Freeview in the long-term. Freely has been integrated in a number of television sets and more recently has had dedicated retail set-top boxes.

== Background ==
The Freeview digital terrestrial television (DTT) service was launched in 2002 by the public broadcasters and the older analogue services were switched off by 2012. Since the 2010s, the number of live television viewers has declined in favour of internet streaming services and this trend is set to continue, especially as the availability of gigabit-capable broadband infrastructure has expanded throughout the country. Due to this shift, audiences for the British public service broadcasters' media have been increasingly eroded by major global streaming services.

Furthermore, the operating costs of traditional terrestrial broadcasts would outstrip usage as more viewers opt to move to broadband-only solutions delivered over IP (the internet). Most Freeview services make use of the DVB-T standard, which dates back to 1997, and only a few high-definition channels broadcast using the more efficient and newer DVB-T2 standard. Freely was first publicised as the Next Generation Platform (NGP) in May 2023. Freely was unveiled in September 2023 and the first products implementing it launched on 30 April 2024, with the advertising campaign headlined "Set yourself Freely".

Despite the creation of Freely, the government has stated that it is committed to the Freeview digital terrestrial platform until at least 2034. The stated expectation is for Freely usage to outpace Freeview and ensure that disadvantaged users of Freeview will not be left behind when the transmitter signals shut down. Everyone TV have also stated that Freely could be complemented in the future with the mobile solution 5G Broadcast, a multicast (one-to-many) system currently under trial that is structurally identical to Freeview and DTT.

== Features ==
All the Freely linear channels are directly streamed via broadband internet, thus not needing an aerial or dish but only requiring a wired Ethernet or wireless Wi-Fi connection to a modem, or alternatively cellular mobile data, with at least a download speed of 10 mbps. Freely has their own channel numbers in a familiar guide, as is the case with other traditional TV platforms, instead of being confined to their individual apps (as has been the case with Freeview Play and a phenomenon sometimes called "walled gardens"). A stated advantage has been that it would not require setting up and logging in to user profiles for the different on demand services such as BBC iPlayer or ITVX, thus simplifying the process. Live pause and programme restarting are also offered.

At launch, the service only provided channels from the four stated public broadcasters and lacked other channels offered through Freeview. Freely has since expanded the service by adding channels such as U&Dave and QVC UK, although a TV aerial remains a requirement for the fullest possible range of channels. In the early days of Freely recording programmes was not possible as no PVR had been produced.

== Hardware and devices ==
Freely has launched integrated on new TV sets from Hisense, Bush, Toshiba, Sharp, Panasonic, Metz and TCL. In a deal with Amazon announced in October 2024, Freely is also to be integrated in new smart TVs based on Fire OS as the main TV guide. New TVs continue to have terrestrial Freeview receivers so they can be connected to an aerial and receive the remaining channels offered on Freeview.

For more than a year, the service was not offered in the form of a set-top box or dongle for existing or older TVs. However in November 2025, Everyone TV launched a first Freely streaming device, without an aerial port, Netgem Pleio, that plugs into existing TVs, working together with French company Netgem. In the same month, the first Freely personal video recorder (PVR) box made by Humax was introduced.

== Technical ==
Freely is based on HbbTV Operator Application specifications. It has not been publicly stated by Freely whether the streams originate from in-house servers or directly from each broadcaster's servers.

== Comparison ==
Comparison with other British public service broadcasters' platforms
	Freeview	Freesat	Freeview Play	Freely
Delivery method	Terrestrial	Satellite	Internet alongside terrestrial	Internet
Launched	2002	2008	2015	2024
Live channels	About 60 TV channels (plus BBC and commercial radio channels)	About 100 TV channels (plus BBC and commercial radio channels)	About 60 TV channels (plus BBC and commercial radio channels) (on terrestrial)	Up to 53 TV channels (plus BBC radio channels)
Browsing method/interface	EPG		EPG (for terrestrial channels) or individual apps (for streaming channels)	EPG
On demand content	No, but internet-capable Freeview devices may have individual applications for the on demand platforms	No, but internet-capable Freesat devices may have individual applications for the on demand platforms	Yes	
User interface type	Specific to TV/STB manufacturer	Standardised	Specific to TV/STB manufacturer	Standardised

== See also ==
- Freeview - terrestrial service complementary
- Freesat - satellite service complementary
- YouView
