= Digital terrestrial television in the United Kingdom =

Digital terrestrial television in the United Kingdom encompasses over 100 television, radio and interactive services broadcast via the United Kingdom's terrestrial television network and receivable with a standard television set. The majority of digital terrestrial television (DTT) services, including the five former analogue channels, are broadcast free-to-air, and a further selection of encrypted pay TV services (such as Racing TV) are also available. Freeview is the only DTT service since Top Up TV closed in 2013.

The digital broadcasting technology adopted in the UK is the DVB-T system (Digital Video Broadcasting – Terrestrial) carrying compressed digital audio, video and other data in a combined transport stream, using COFDM modulation. A total of eight national and one local 'multiplexes' are broadcast in the UK, guaranteed to reach over 90% of the country. Three of the multiplexes, carrying the free public service channels operated by the BBC, ITV, Channel 4, S4C and Channel 5, are guaranteed wider coverage still, reaching 98.5% of the country including areas dependent on low-power local relays.

In the UK, the switchover from analogue to digital TV started on 17 October 2007 and was completed on 24 October 2012. Each group of regional transmitters had its analogue broadcasts switched off at a certain point between those dates.

== Receiving and recording ==
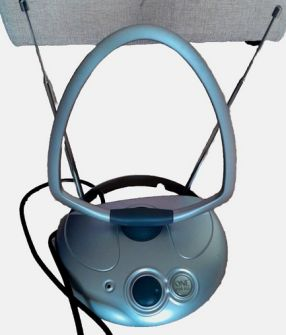
DTT requires a loop aerial such as this One For All model, which are designed to receive the signals on the UHF band that DTT uses in the UK's airwaves.

Digital Terrestrial Television is commonly received by means of a compatible set-top box or integrated digital television (IDTV), connected to an appropriate receiving antenna. In most cases, reception is possible using aerials originally used for analogue television.

Transmissions may be recorded in many ways – such as via the connection of a set-top-box to an existing 'analogue' video or DVD recorder, or by the use of newer models of such recorders which have built-in digital tuners. However, the most common option is by the use of set-top-boxes which incorporate a hard disk drive, and allow the recording of the digital signal directly to disk, for later replay. Recording on such boxes, known as Personal Video Recorders or PVRs, is more convenient, as programmes may be easily selected for recording from an on-screen programme guide, with no need to specify explicit start and end times for recordings, and no need to program more than one piece of equipment.

Many television services which incorporate DTT channels in their service offering – e.g. Top Up TV, BT TV, and TalkTalk Plus TV, offer set top boxes with such a recording facility. Non-subscription DTT PVRs are also available and are often sold under the 'Freeview+' banner (formerly Freeview Playback.)

There also exist a variety of solutions to enable the viewing and recording of DTT programmes on personal computers, with various TV cards or USB tuners available for use with a variety of software packages, including MythTV and Windows Media Center. Most cards or tuners include their own software in the package also.

== Features ==
Digital Terrestrial Television provides many more channels. For some viewers it offers much improved reception compared to analogue broadcasts (although these had been entirely discontinued in the UK by 2012), including 16:9 anamorphic widescreen. A number of interactive services are also offered.

An eight-day Electronic Programme Guide (EPG) is available and allows viewers to see programme descriptions and broadcast times well in advance. PVRs can make use of this facility when setting recording timers.

== Early history ==
=== Development and launch ===
Digital terrestrial television launched in the UK on 15 November 1998, just after digital satellite television on 1 October 1998. The technology required that the UK government license the broadcast of channels in six groups, or multiplexes (abbreviated to 'mux'), labelled 1, 2, A, B, C, and D.

The Independent Television Commission allocated half the capacity of a multiplex to each of the existing analogue terrestrial channels. This meant the BBC got a multiplex to themselves (Multiplex 1), ITV and Channel 4 shared Multiplex 2 (though 3% of the capacity was given to Teletext Ltd.) and Channel 5 and S4C shared Multiplex A. The remaining spectrum (Multiplexes B, C and D) was then auctioned off. A consortium made up of Granada and Carlton (members of the ITV network, who later merged to form ITV plc) and BSkyB successfully bid for these licences, and set up the subscription ONdigital service, though BSkyB left the consortium prior to launch.

The BBC used some of its multiplex for three of its new television services: BBC Choice (which had started on 23 September 1998 with four national variations), BBC News 24 and BBC Parliament (albeit in sound only). ITV initially used their space to house ITV2 (from 7 December 1998) in England and Wales, You2 (later UTV2) in Northern Ireland and S2 in Scotland (later both replaced by ITV2), as well as GMTV2 during the early mornings. Channel 4 used their space for subscription channels FilmFour and E4 which, although not part of ONdigital, were only available through an ONdigital subscription. The nationwide coverage provided by multiplex 2 enabled Channel 4 to be received terrestrially throughout much of Wales for the first time in its history, where previously only S4C had been available. Consequently, S4C's digital service S4C Digidol carried only Welsh-language programming, in contrast to S4C analogue which also carried English-language programmes commissioned and transmitted by Channel 4 in other parts of the UK.

Channel 5 sold its half of Multiplex A to the owners of the other half, S4C, who set up a subsidiary called S4C Digital Networks (SDN) to manage the multiplex. They rented most of it to ONdigital, and some space to the BBC who launched BBC Knowledge on 1 June 1999, at a time when technical capabilities limited the number of stations it could carry on its own multiplex. S4C chose not to carry S4C Digidol and its newly launched digital Welsh Assembly station S4C2 outside Wales, preferring to sell the space instead. Consequently, some ONdigital services were not available on Welsh transmitters.

While the BBC was seemingly concerned with delivering a service of good technical quality, other broadcasters chose to deliver a larger number of channels rather than optimise service reliability and picture quality.

=== ITV Digital ===
ONdigital was unprofitable from the start, and renaming the service ITV Digital on 11 July 2001 failed to help the matter. All subscription services except E4 and FilmFour went off-air on 1 May 2002 after the consortium collapsed, explained as being due to paying too much for the television rights for The Football League. However, the choice of 64QAM broadcast mode, the fact that at least 40% of homes would need new aerials to receive it, a high churn rate, an insecure and hackable encryption system, the cost of having to provide free set-top boxes, and aggressive competition from BSkyB all contributed to ITV Digital's spiralling costs before shareholders Granada and Carlton called a halt to the venture.

=== Freeview ===
When ITV Digital collapsed, the rights reverted to the regulator and the Independent Television Commission invited bids for the space on Multiplexes B, C and D. The Freeview consortium was formed by the BBC, transmitter company National Grid Wireless (known at the time as Crown Castle UK) and BSkyB. This consortium (legal name DTV Services Ltd and trading under the "Freeview" brand) won and launched a new service. Dropping the failed ITV Digital business model, Freeview launched on 30 October 2002 with free television channels only, and made digital radio stations available on television receivers for the first time.

The BBC controlled one Multiplex (B) for its own services, and Crown Castle/National Grid the other two (C & D) for commercial services, though the Community Channel also operated on Multiplex B. The BBC's second multiplex allowed it to televise BBC Parliament where it had previously only been available in sound, allowed BBC Knowledge and its successor, BBC4, to stop renting space from SDN for coverage, and allowed for special video screens in its interactive service BBCi for use during selected sporting events.

On 11 October 2005, ITV plc and Channel 4 joined the Freeview consortium. In the same year ITV plc bought SDN, and thus gained control of Multiplex A.

=== Top Up TV ===
The space ITV Digital had rented on other multiplexes initially became empty again, but some was rented out to allow new channels to launch. In May 2004 Top Up TV was launched to provide subscription content in hitherto unused space on multiplex A rented from Channel 5, and additional services transmitted by Channel 4 on their own capacity on Multiplex 2.

Turner Classic Movies purchased its own slot throughout England, Scotland and Northern Ireland from the multiplex owner, SDN, but rented from Sit-up Ltd in Wales, timesharing with bid tv. Multiplex A was ultimately owned by ITV Plc via its SDN acquisition, but ITV only had involvement with Top Up TV channels via Channel 5. In September of the same year, Top Up TV began operating solely on Multiplex A, as Channel 4 reclaimed the space on Multiplex 2 for its own services More 4, E4, and later Film4.

In October 2006, Channel 5 launched two new free-to-air digital channels, Five Life and Five US, using capacity formerly leased out to Top Up TV. This left Top Up TV with a reduced number of video streams. In November 2006, the company launched Top Up TV Anytime, where overnight "downloads" were recorded by a proprietary personal video recorder (PVR). At the same time, they started reducing the linear service.

=== 2006 changes to regulations ===
On 19 April 2006, Ofcom ruled that, on request of each multiplex operator, the 'free-to-air channels only' requirement put in place at the launch of Freeview in 2002 could be lifted on Multiplex B, C and D. Ofcom said that the digital television market had changed significantly since 2002.

During the consultation, 9 of the 12 responses from broadcasters were in favour of removing the restriction. These included the BBC. The BBC agreed that the digital television market had changed substantially since 2002, and that Top Up TV probably could not afford the current cost of DTT slots anyway. The BBC suggested that the deregulation should be conditional on a number of further changes to regulation. These included that Ofcom change the transmission mode of broadcast on all multiplexes from 16QAM to 64QAM so more services could be broadcast. However, Ofcom rejected these suggestions, saying they were outside the scope of the consultation.

Out of the three that opposed, one was Channel 4, which had built a portfolio of free-to-air channels, among them Film4 which was made free-to-air on all platforms on 23 July 2006. Channel 4 argued that the number of free channels was the driving force behind the uptake of the platform, with more than 10 million Freeview boxes in use. A number of broadcasters requested that their replies were kept confidential. These include ITV and BSkyB. However, it is believed that ITV opposed the plan and BSkyB supported it.

The channels on Multiplexes B, C and D are those owned by the Freeview consortium and include the three Sky channels on the platform and the UKTV channels. However, Ofcom believed that in the short to medium term, it was unlikely free-to-air channels would convert to pay TV. This is because, firstly, Multiplex B is run by the BBC, which is not expected to request the removal of the free-to-air requirement. Secondly, due to the nature of the contracts the channel broadcasters held with multiplex operators and content providers, it was unlikely a channel would be able to change to pay-TV.

=== 2008 BSkyB proposal ===
It was announced on 8 February 2007 that BSkyB intended to withdraw Sky Three, Sky News and Sky Sports News from the platform in the summer of 2007, and replace them with four of its subscription channels. It also said that it would use an alternative (MPEG4) codec, which would enable a greater number of channels to be broadcast, but would require the purchase of new equipment for those who wished to receive the new service. On 6 October 2007 Ofcom said that the plans for a new subscription service raised competition concerns and could have to be scrapped.

=== 2008 update issues ===
During 2008, a rolling programme of transmitter updates caused approximately 250,000 set-top boxes to stop working. Freeview had warned consumers in advance of the update, which was phased over a three-month period. The problem affected a specific range of older units, and was caused by an increased Network Information Table (channel list) exceeding the memory available in some set-top boxes. This had been part of the specification that was available and implemented in the very early OnDigital boxes, but not in those using the SetPal chip set. Affected consumers were advised to buy new set-top boxes.

== Digital switchover ==
UK digital switchover dates

=== Summary ===
The UK Government's intention was that digital terrestrial television would completely replace analogue terrestrial television in the United Kingdom by 24 October 2012. This process was known as "Digital Switchover", or DSO. The industry association for digital television in the UK, Digital TV Group, was responsible for co-ordination between Freeview and other digital services. DTG licensed the marking of suitable equipment with 'digital tick' or 'Freeview Playback' logos to identify PVRs and other devices designed to work through switchover, and to raise awareness of DTT product quality and standards. Digital terrestrial television is broadcast using the DVB-T international standard for standard-definition content and DVB-T2 for high definition content.

The digital switchover process involved discontinuing analogue terrestrial TV broadcasts, which in some areas allowed for greater signal strength and/or better coverage of digital multiplexes. The process concluded on 24 October 2012, when digital switchover completed in Northern Ireland (the same day as the Republic of Ireland also completed its digital switchover).

In areas where analogue signals had terminated, older receiving equipment was likely to require replacement or upgrade. This process was subsidised by the UK Government for those on low incomes. Contracts for this operation were awarded to BSkyB in the Border Television region. Upgrading of analogue receiving equipment required a Freeview set-top box (or other DVB-T capable digital receiver). Where an analogue TV recording device was in use this ideally would require a separate Freeview set-top box, to replicate the previous functionality of recording and watching different programme sources.

=== History ===
The progress towards digital switchover in the UK was long. The then Secretary of State for Culture, Media and Sport, Chris Smith, announced in 1999 that the Government's intention was to achieve switchover "between 2006 and 2010". Work started in earnest with the setting up of the Digital Action Plan, a body working across industry, government and consumer groups to advise on the best way to meet the switchover target date.

By 2003, however, it was becoming clear that switchover could not start by 2006. In particular, the decision taken by the International Telecommunication Union to call a Regional Radiocommunication Conference to establish a frequency plan for digital broadcasting meant that in practice, substantive steps towards switchover would need to wait until after the conference's second session, due to be held in May and June 2006.

On 15 September 2005, addressing the Royal Television Society in Cambridge, Smith's successor at the DCMS, Tessa Jowell, announced the go-ahead for switchover in the UK, coupled with support measures to ensure the disadvantaged are not left behind.

On the day after Jowell's speech, an independent not-for-profit company, Digital UK (now Everyone TV), was established to co-ordinate the switchover process. Set up by the broadcasters and the commercial multiplex operators, Digital UK was required to co-ordinate the project and ensure that the public are kept informed about progress.

Local television broadcasters, including the BBC and ITV, actively encouraged viewers to upgrade to digital television. UK broadcasters were also under additional pressure to complete migration before the 2012 Olympic Games.

=== Digital rollout ===
The British Government gave Ofcom and Digital UK jointly the task of discontinuing analogue television broadcasting. The switch-off occurred on an ITV sub-region basis. In March 2005, a technical trial in Ferryside, Wales, resulted in viewers losing three out of the four available analogue channels in favour of going digital, leaving only analogue BBC Two Wales until switchover at Preseli in August 2009 (at the time, BBC 2W on digital offered a different schedule to BBC Two Wales on analogue).

In October 2007, following a 15-month publicity and information campaign, and an early digital launch in August by Channel 5, the Whitehaven, Eskdale Green and Gosforth transmitters switched off analogue signals on the BBC Two frequency, and began broadcasting a temporary digital service for the main channels. On 14 November, all analogue signals were switched off, and the permanent three-multiplex digital service began (albeit with Channel 5 only on the Whitehaven transmitter, until 2009). Unfortunately, as had been feared, a small number of homes among the hills, which had received "fuzzy" analogue signals, particularly in Eskdale, were unable to receive a decodable Freeview signal. The only other serious problem resulted from the "rescan" command in some models of set-top box defaulting to frequencies used by the nearest main transmitter, instead of the strongest digital signals; this could be overcome by using the "add channel" option to select channels one-by-one, and in the long term by corrections to the boxes' software.

In November 2008, the full rolling programme started in the ITV Border region at the Selkirk transmitter, with the Caldbeck transmitter switching a year later (Caldbeck was rebuilt, and broadcasts Scottish multiplexes as well as English ones to improve service to viewers north of the border; the nearby Sandale transmitter ceased to broadcast TV). The programme continued across the rest of the country, with the Westcountry region, Wales and the Granada region switching over in 2009. The West, STV North, STV Central regions and the Channel Islands followed in 2010; the Central, Yorkshire and Anglia regions in 2011; and finally the Meridian, London, Tyne Tees & UTV regions in 2012.

Many decisions had to be made, including what to do about people who may find the new technology confusing, or who have no desire to receive more than the four or five channels they originally had, and who may have been reluctant to buy a digital box to view the free channels. The government arranged for the BBC to administer a Digital Switchover Help Scheme to ensure that groups such as the over-75s and recipients of disability benefits did not lose their television services when analogue transmissions were switched off.

Another issue was that the "98.5 per cent of the population" availability target could only be achieved "via rooftop aerials", while Section 134 of the Communications Act 2003 sets out the principle "that no person should unreasonably be denied access to an electronic communications network or to electronic communications services". This is taken to mean that everyone has the right to mount a television aerial on their roof. Ofcom allocated frequencies for groups of households to provide "self-help" relay transmitters at their own expense (for analogue broadcasts there were some 200 of these, serving around 13,000 households), but suggested that in such cases, terrestrial TV may no longer be the most cost-effective solution.

=== The switchover process ===
After several months of press publicity, leaflet drops, public meetings etc., captions started appearing on analogue broadcasts from the affected transmitters, warning viewers that the analogue service would shortly be switched off and that they would need to take action (for Whitehaven, the first large area to switch over, the captions started appearing some 5 months before the BBC Two analogue service was switched off). At about the same time, details of the Switchover Help Scheme were distributed. Although viewers who lived outside existing Freeview reception areas were unable to test any digital receiving equipment they had bought at this early stage, test-screens on Ceefax (BBC One & Two) and Teletext (ITV & C4/S4C) page 284 made it possible to determine whether they were likely to need a new aerial or a signal amplifier to receive digital transmissions.

Next, detailed information booklets were delivered to all households in the area (including many on the fringe who may have been receiving their TV from other transmitters- hence the importance of the on-screen warning captions). Two or three months later, the first stage of the switchover began with the analogue BBC Two replaced with the new BBC A multiplex. At some locations, during the period between stage one and stage two, BBC One, ITV or Channel 4 moved to the analogue BBC Two frequency where that channel's frequency was required for the digital transmission of Multiplex 1. At the same time, captions appeared on the remaining analogue channels reminding viewers of the impending switchover. Finally, the second stage saw the remaining analogue transmissions switched off and the other high power multiplexes switched on. Initially, this occurred four weeks after stage one, but starting with the switchover at Mendip in April 2010 onwards, this gap was reduced to two weeks.

Three multiplexes (BBC A, D3&4, BBC B) are for public service broadcasting and are broadcast from all transmitter sites. They contain around 25 TV channels, half a dozen radio stations and half a dozen text/interactive services. These include all the television channels from the BBC, some from ITV and Channel 4, Channel 5 and S4C (in Wales only). The other three multiplexes (SDN, Arqiva A, Arqiva B) are broadcast from main transmitter sites only and are operated by their respective commercial licence-holders. To reflect the slightly changed roles, the multiplex names were also changed:

Old multiplex name	New multiplex name	Owning company
1	BBC A	BBC
2	D3&4	Digital 3&4
A	SDN	S4C Digital Networks (ITV plc)
B	BBC B	BBC
C	Arqiva A	Arqiva
D	Arqiva B	Arqiva

=== Post-switchover ===
The adoption of the technically superior DVB-T format occurred in each region at the date of switchover. This resulted in no reception for viewers with older '2k' only equipment, such as former ONdigital/ITV Digital boxes, and other incompatible IDTVs and set top boxes.

In the Meridian and Anglia regions, transmitters formed a single-frequency network when they were converted to all-digital operation.

Alternative post-switchover multiplex designations were used on internal documentation by the BBC switchover contractor Arqiva, but changing the designations of the multiplexes requires changes to legislation and to the multiplex licences issued by Ofcom and is not in the current draft.

When digital switchover was complete, two new sub-bands of the UHF spectrum were clear (frequencies corresponding to channel ranges 31–40 and 63–69), leaving only channels 21–30 and 41–62 for digital television multiplexes. This "digital dividend" required millions of homes to upgrade their aerials to the wideband type to receive some or all of the Freeview multiplexes. This spectrum is useful because of its trade-off between bandwidth and range. Following a consultation, in September 2011 Ofcom stated that an auction for the 600 MHz band will most likely lead to channels 31–37 being used for three new TV multiplexes; a reference transmission plan assumes two frequencies would be multiple-frequency networks, and channel 36 would be used as a national single-frequency network. The remaining reallocated frequencies can be re-used for other services, for example the provision of:

- mobile television services
- wireless (mobile) broadband services
- wider coverage for advanced services in remote and rural areas
- more multiplexes carrying more channels
- high definition (HD) services

The clearing and re-allocation of these channels of the spectrum for other services caused some controversy within technical industries, such as wireless microphones, as Ofcom decided to clear channel 69 (854–862 MHz) to match the rest of Europe and make the facilitation of future services easier.

Further re-allocations of the other freed analogue television channels have not yet occurred, but when implemented will require legislation changes. It is likely that if they are sold commercially, they will not only attract interest, but may be bought for millions of pounds due to the high demand for spectrum throughout most of Europe. Ofcom published further information about the auctioned channels.

OFCOM released their consultation of the future of the 600 MHz and 700 MHz UHF bands beyond 2018 on 16 November 2012. This document recommends that the 600 MHz UHF band is allocated to DVB-T2 MPEG-4 Freeview HD services and "whitespace" services, allowing a future migration of the existing 700 MHz Freeview allocation to 700 MHz mobile data services, and synchronising the spectrum usage with many other markets in Europe and globally.

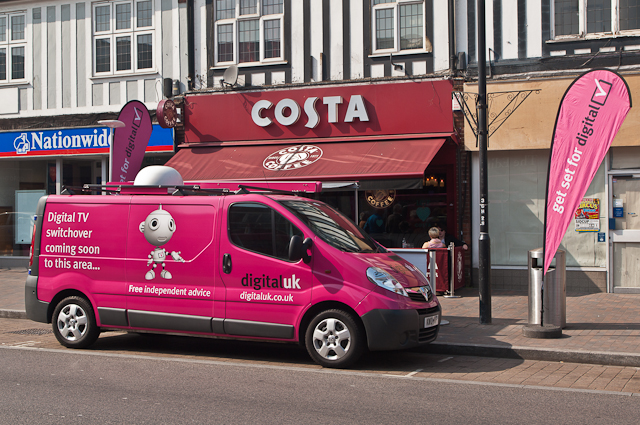
An image of Digit Al on a van, advertising the digital switchover

=== Digit Al ===
Digit Al is a robot character created for Digital UK in 2005, by Abbott Mead Vickers BBDO and voiced by the English comedy actor Matt Lucas, used in material publicising the digital switchover. It appeared in the public information programme run by Digital UK until 2012. The character was first transmitted simultaneously on about 100 television channels and on regional BBC television on 5 May 2006.

== Post-switchover reorganisation and HD ==
In March 2006, the development of a new second generation digital terrestrial broadcasting standard, DVB-T2, was agreed by the DVB Group.

The BBC, ITV, Channel 4, S4C and Channel 5 agreed with the regulator Ofcom to convert one UK multiplex (B, or PSB3) to DVB-T2 to increase capacity for HDTV (High Definition Television) via DTT. The first TV region to use the new standard was Granada in November 2009 (with existing switched over regions being changed at the same time). It is expected that over time there will be enough DVB-T2 receivers sold to switch all DTT transmissions to DVB-T2, and MPEG-4 Part 10.

From 27 October 2009, Multiplex B (PSB3) was cleared of SD channels in post DSO areas, which were moved to Multiplex 1 (PSB1). In pre DSO areas, Multiplex B continued to carry BBC Four, BBC Parliament, CBeebies, BBC Radio Stations and 301 until DSO. Former streams of 302 and News Multiscreen on Multiplex B were sublet to broadcasters other than the BBC for pre DSO areas only, and were not available at all in post DSO areas because of the new DVB-T2 HD multiplex as replacement.

On 3 April 2008, Ofcom published its final decision for the HDTV transmission format: DVB-T2 and MPEG-4. Initially there were to be three HD services available: BBC HD, ITV HD/STV HD and Channel 4 HD/S4C Clirlun. Channel 5 HD was due to launch during 2010 but was unable to reach 'key criteria' to keep its slot. Spare allocation on multiplex B was handed over to the BBC, two years to the date when it was anticipated that further capacity on multiplex B would revert to the control of the BBC Trust. On 3 November 2010, BBC One HD launched on Freeview HD. It is available in addition to the existing BBC HD channel. During 2011, Ofcom gave the Commercial Public Service Broadcasters another opportunity to apply to provide an additional HD service from 2012.

== Multiplexing ==
=== The multiplexes ===
Current multiplexes
Mux name			Operator	Broadcast mode		Bit-rate		Notes	Non-exhaustive list of channels
pre-switchover	post-switchover license name	post-switchover operating name	Operator	pre-switchover	post-switchover	pre-switchover	post-switchover	Notes	Non-exhaustive list of channels
Multiplex 1	PSB1	BBC A	BBC	16-QAM	64-QAM	18 Mbit/s	24 Mbit/s	Carries all non-HD BBC channels	BBC1, BBC2, BBC4, BBC News, CBeebies
Multiplex 2	PSB2	D3&4	Digital 3&4 (an ITV / Channel 4 consortium)	64-QAM	64-QAM	24 Mbit/s	24 Mbit/s		ITV, Channel 4, Channel 5, ITV2, E4, Film4
Multiplex A	COM4	SDN	SDN (owned by ITV plc)	64-QAM	64-QAM	24 Mbit/s	24 Mbit/s		S4C, 5STAR, 5USA, QVC, U&Drama, Legend, Great! Action
Multiplex B	PSB3	BBC B	BBC	16-QAM	256-QAM	18 Mbit/s	40 Mbit/s	HD services. Transmits MPEG4 data using DVB-T2 (rather than MPEG2/DVB-T as used on other multiplexes).	BBC1 HD, BBC2 HD, ITV HD, Channel 4 HD, Channel 5 HD
Multiplex C	COM5	ARQ A	Arqiva	16-QAM	64-QAM	18 Mbit/s	27 Mbit/s		Challenge, Sky Arts, Sky News, Food Network
Multiplex D	COM6	ARQ B	Arqiva	16-QAM	64-QAM	18 Mbit/s	27 Mbit/s		Quest, Ideal World, Yesterday, Great! Movies

Former multiplexes
Mux name		Operator	Broadcast mode	Bit-rate	Notes	Ceased
License name	Operating name	Operator	Broadcast mode	Bit-rate	Notes	Ceased
COM8	ARQ D	Arqiva	256-QAM	40 Mbit/s	HD services, MPEG4	22 June 2020
COM7	ARQ C	Arqiva	256-QAM	40 Mbit/s	HD services MPEG4 DVB-T2	30 June 2022

In 2014, Ofcom decided to reallocate the frequency band used by COM7 and COM8 to make it available for mobile communications. This project, known as "700 MHz clearance", was intended to be complete by the second quarter of 2020; as of June 2020 the switch-off is largely complete but the remaining transmitter changes are postponed due to the COVID-19 pandemic. Channels broadcast on the COM8 multiplex were cleared by Arqiva on 22 June 2020, with some services moving to broadcast from COM7 or PSB3.

=== Use of multiplexing technology ===
Each multiplex is an error-protected bitstream of 24, 27 or 40 megabits per second, which can be used for almost any combination of digitally-encoded video, audio and data. The DVB-T standard provides a multiplex service that can make trade-offs between the number of services and the picture and audio quality.

- a number of services use the same bandwidth at different times. For example, CBeebies and BBC Four currently use the same space in their multiplex, with CBeebies broadcasting from 6 am until 7 pm and BBC Four from 7 pm.
- some multiplexes allocate more bandwidth to services, providing a smaller number of higher-quality services.
- The modulation of the multiplexes can be varied to squeeze higher digital bitrates out of the same portion of the electromagnetic spectrum, but require a stronger signal for good reception. The modulation schemes used in the UK are, in order of bandwidth efficiency, each with a progressively higher bitrate, at the cost of progressively higher likelihood of signal degradation:
  - QPSK (Used for local TV broadcasts where available, see Local Television in the United Kingdom, as well as the NI multiplex in Northern Ireland to provide RTÉ and TG4)
  - 16-QAM (only used on the G-MAN multiplex broadcast from the Winter Hill transmitting station since the Digital Switchover)
  - 64-QAM (used on the national DVB-T multiplexes)
  - 256-QAM (only used on the DVB-T2 multiplex)
  - 1024-QAM
  - 2048-QAM (currently in development)

By late 2009, multiplexes 2 and A used 64-QAM and were consequently more prone to poor reception, while the other multiplexes used 16-QAM. At switchover the transmission mode was changed from 16-QAM to 64-QAM on Multiplex 1 (PSB1), increasing the effective bandwidth of the multiplex. The switch to 64-QAM mode also provided extra bandwidth on Multiplexes C (COM5) and D (COM6).

By late 2012, the digital switchover was complete, with all DVB-T multiplexes using 64-QAM. The switchover allowed the transmitters to broadcast at a higher power level, reducing the likelihood of reception errors when receiving 64-QAM encoded broadcasts.

- Multiplexes can make use of statistical multiplexing at the MPEG video coder whereby the bitrate allocated to a channel within the multiplex can vary dynamically depending on how difficult it is to code the picture content at that precise time, and how much demand there is for bandwidth from other channels. In this way, complex pictures with much detail may demand a higher bitrate at one instant and this can result in the bitrate allocated to another channel in the same multiplex being reduced if the second channel is currently transmitting pictures which are easier to encode, with less fine detail.

=== Improvements in compression technology ===
Developments in statistical multiplexing, improved compression technology, and, in some cases, an acceptance of lower quality or lower resolution broadcasts, allowed gradual increases in the number of services carried on digital terrestrial television multiplexes.

As the number of homes receiving digital terrestrial grew, the interest in new channel capacity increased. In 2005, the auction for two new slots on National Grid Wireless multiplex D resulted in broadcasters bidding high prices to gain bandwidth. ITV won the bidding for the first slot (on which it launched Men & Motors on 2 May 2005, replaced by ITV Play and later ITV2+1), and Channel 4 the second. Channel 4 launched E4 +1 (not its new channel More4) on the multiplex when the slot became available on 1 June (E4 launched on Freeview on 27 May 2005). National Grid Wireless made an additional new slot available on Multiplex D using the new compression techniques. The 18-hour channel, running from 6 am to midnight, became available on 1 December 2005. Companies interested had until 1 November to submit their bids, with bids said to have reached £10 million, from an entry level of £5.5 million, with 12 separate bidders covering all sectors of broadcasting. This slot was won by Channel 4; it was occupied by More4+1 until live coverage of Big Brother replaced it on 18 May 2006. Film4 took over the slot 23 July 2006.

Later compression technology, implemented in codecs like MPEG4, H.264 or VC-1, can enable a substantial increase in either quality or capacity due to their increased efficiency, but use of such technologies would again require most viewers to purchase new reception equipment, since the vast majority of standard set-top boxes support only the older MPEG2 encoding. BSkyB were the first to suggest such a move to increase the number of channels available within their own share of space using MPEG4 on a subscription service. However, BSkyB's proposals were ultimately shelved following regulatory delays.

The BBC, which ultimately broadcast high-definition television on Freeview in the DVB-T2 format adopted in 2009, initially considered an alternative method utilising spare capacity at night to allow the download of high definition programmes for later replay. In addition the BBC's Research and Development team invented a transmission method that doubles the effective bandwidth that could currently be delivered by each multiplex using "spatial multiplexing". While conventional analogue and digital terrestrial television signals are transmitted either vertically or horizontally polarised (providing protection against interference from other distant signals which may be transmitted on the same frequency, but will usually be planned to use the opposite polarisation), the proposed technique would have involved using the same frequency to transmit two different signals at once, one vertically and one horizontally polarised. A special receiving aerial, containing both vertically and horizontally polarised elements, could receive both signals simultaneously and feed these to a suitable set top box, but would require new transmitters and receiving equipment and aerials; the technique was ultimately not adopted.

== See also ==
- Digital television in the United Kingdom
- Top Up TV
- BT TV
- Freesat
- High-definition television in the United Kingdom
- Freely
