= Freeview (UK) =

British digital terrestrial television platform

- Type: Joint venture
- Industry: Television broadcasting
- Predecessor: ITV Digital
- Founded: 30 October 2002
- Headquarters: London, England, UK
- Area served: United Kingdom
- Products: Equipment to receive free-to-air digital terrestrial television channels
- Owners: BBC; ITV; Channel 4; Channel 5; Sky
- Parent: Everyone TV; DTV Services Ltd
- Website: freeview.co.uk

Freeview is the United Kingdom's sole digital terrestrial television platform. It is operated by Everyone TV and DTV Services Ltd, a joint venture between the BBC, ITV, Channel 4, 5 and Sky. The service provides consumer access via an aerial to the seven DTT multiplexes covering Great Britain, Northern Ireland, the Isle of Man and the Channel Islands. As of July 2020, it has 85 TV channels, 26 digital radio channels, 10 HD channels, six text services, 11 streamed channels, and one interactive channel.

It was launched on 30 October 2002, taking over the licence from ITV Digital which collapsed that year. Almost ten million British homes are estimated to make use of the service. The Freely service introduced in 2024 is expected to gradually replace Freeview in the long term.

== Overview ==
The technical specification for Freeview is published and maintained by the Digital TV Group, the industry association for digital TV in the UK which also provide the test and conformance regime for Freeview, Freeview + and Freeview HD products. DMOL (DTT Multiplex Operators Ltd.), a company owned by the operators of the six DTT multiplexes (BBC, ITV, Channel 4, and Arqiva) is responsible for technical platform management and policy, including the electronic programme guide and channel numbering.

Delivery of standard-definition television and radio is labelled Freeview, while delivery of HDTV is called Freeview HD. Reception of Freeview requires a DVB-T/DVB-T2 tuner, either in a separate set-top box or built into the TV set. Since 2008, all new TV sets sold in the United Kingdom have a built-in Freeview tuner. Freeview HD requires an HDTV-capable tuner. Digital video recorders (DVRs) with a built-in Freeview tuner are labelled Freeview+. Depending on model, DVRs and HDTV sets with a Freeview tuner may offer standard Freeview or Freeview HD. Freeview Play is a more recent addition which adds direct access to catch-up services via the Internet.

== History ==
Logo used from 2006 to 2015

Freeview officially launched on 30 October 2002 at 5 am, when the BBC and Crown Castle (now Arqiva) officially took over the digital terrestrial television (DTT) licences to broadcast on the three multiplexes from the defunct ITV Digital. The founding members of DTV Services, who trade as Freeview, were the BBC, Crown Castle UK and British Sky Broadcasting. On 11 October 2006, ITV plc and Channel 4 became equal shareholders. Since then, the Freeview model has been copied in Australia and New Zealand.

Although all pay channels had been closed down on ITV Digital, many free-to-air channels continued broadcasting, including the five analogue channels and digital channels such as ITV2, ITN News Channel, S4C2, TV Travel Shop and QVC. With the launch of Freeview other channels were broadcast free-to-air, such as: Sky Travel, UK History, Sky News, Sky Sports News, The Hits (later renamed 4Music in 2008, now defunct) and TMF (later renamed Viva in 2009, now defunct) were available from the start. BBC Four and the interactive BBC streams were moved to multiplex B. Under the initial plans, the two multiplexes operated by Crown Castle would carry eight channels altogether. The seventh stream became shared by UK Bright Ideas and Ftn which launched in February 2003. The eighth stream was left unused until April 2004 when the shopping channel Ideal World launched on Freeview. There are now 14 streams carried by two multiplexes, with Multiplex C carrying 6 streams, and Multiplex D carrying 8. It has recently been announced that more streams are now available on the multiplexes, and that bidding is under way.

=== 2009 retune ===
The Freeview service underwent a major upgrade on 30 September 2009, which required 18 million households to retune their Freeview receiving equipment. The changes, meant to ensure proper reception of Channel 5, led to several thousand complaints from people who lost channels (notably ITV3 and ITV4) as a result of retuning their equipment. The Freeview website crashed and the call centre was inundated as a result of the problems. The change involved an update to the NIT (Network Information Table), which some receivers could not accommodate. Many thousands of people could not receive some channels. This included 460,000 fed from relay stations who lost access to ITV3 and ITV4. Updates were broadcast to enable firmware changes, but in some cases the receiver must be left on and receiving broadcasts to accept the updates; not everyone was aware of this.

=== 2014 retune ===
The Freeview service underwent a major upgrade on 3 September 2014 which required 18 million households to retune their Freeview receiving equipment. The changes included a reshuffle of the Children's, News, and Interactive genres.

A number of new HD channels launched in 2014, from a new group of multiplexes awarded to Arqiva. The new HD channels were launched in selected areas on 10 December 2013 with a further roll-out during 2014.

=== Temporary multiplex removal ===
The temporary multiplexes are Arqiva-owned multiplexes called COM7 and COM8, DVB-T2 multiplexes for Freeview HD capable devices carrying some channels including HD channels. COM7 is made up of mostly +1s and HDs such as More4+1 and BBC News HD. COM8 consisted of +1s, HDs and other channels such as NOW 80s, PBS America+1 and BBC Four HD. Over the decade these multiplexes are being shut off with COM8 closing on 6 June 2020, with many +1 and HD channels like 5Star+1 and 4seven HD closing and others (like Now 80s) moving to COM7.

=== Technical problems ===
On 10 August 2021, the 315-metre (1,033 ft) Bilsdale transmitter caught fire leaving up to a million homes in the North East of England without a TV or radio signal. Work was ongoing to restore services, but delays to the granting of planning permission for an 80-metre (260 ft) temporary mast sited at Bilsdale, and the lack of safe access to the site, have left up to half a million homes without a service as of 8 September 2021. A temporary mast commenced operations on 13 October 2021, with a permanent replacement, for the television transmissions being enabled on 22 May 2023.

On the evening of 25 September 2021, transmissions of Freeview channels operated by the BBC, Channel 4 and ViacomCBS (Channel 5) were impacted by the activation of a fire suppressant system at the premises of Red Bee Media. While the BBC moved its playout from White City to Salford and Channel 5 went into 'recovery mode' (with viewers seeing an additional black & white symbol at the top of the screen), Channel 4's channels went off air for a number of hours with E4+1 and 4Music still off air on Monday 27 September (though 4Music's channel 30 slot was relaying the output of The Box, with its back-to-back music video format, on that date).

== Channels ==
The Freeview service broadcasts free-to-air television channels, radio stations and interactive services from the existing public service broadcasters. Channels on the service include the BBC, ITV, Channel 4 and Channel 5 terrestrial channels, as well as their digital services. In addition, channels from other commercial operators, such as Sky and UKTV, are available, as well as radio services from a number of broadcasters.

The full range of channels broadcast via digital terrestrial television includes some pay television services such as BoxNation and Racing UK. These channels, although available only to subscribers with appropriate equipment, are listed in the on-screen electronic programme guides displayed by many Freeview receivers but cannot be viewed.

The link above gives a full up-to-date list of channels, but, as of January 2020, excluding channels such as S4C or the many local TV services (one service included in the count) they total 105 Freeview, 17 Freeview HD and 33 radio.

== Reception equipment ==
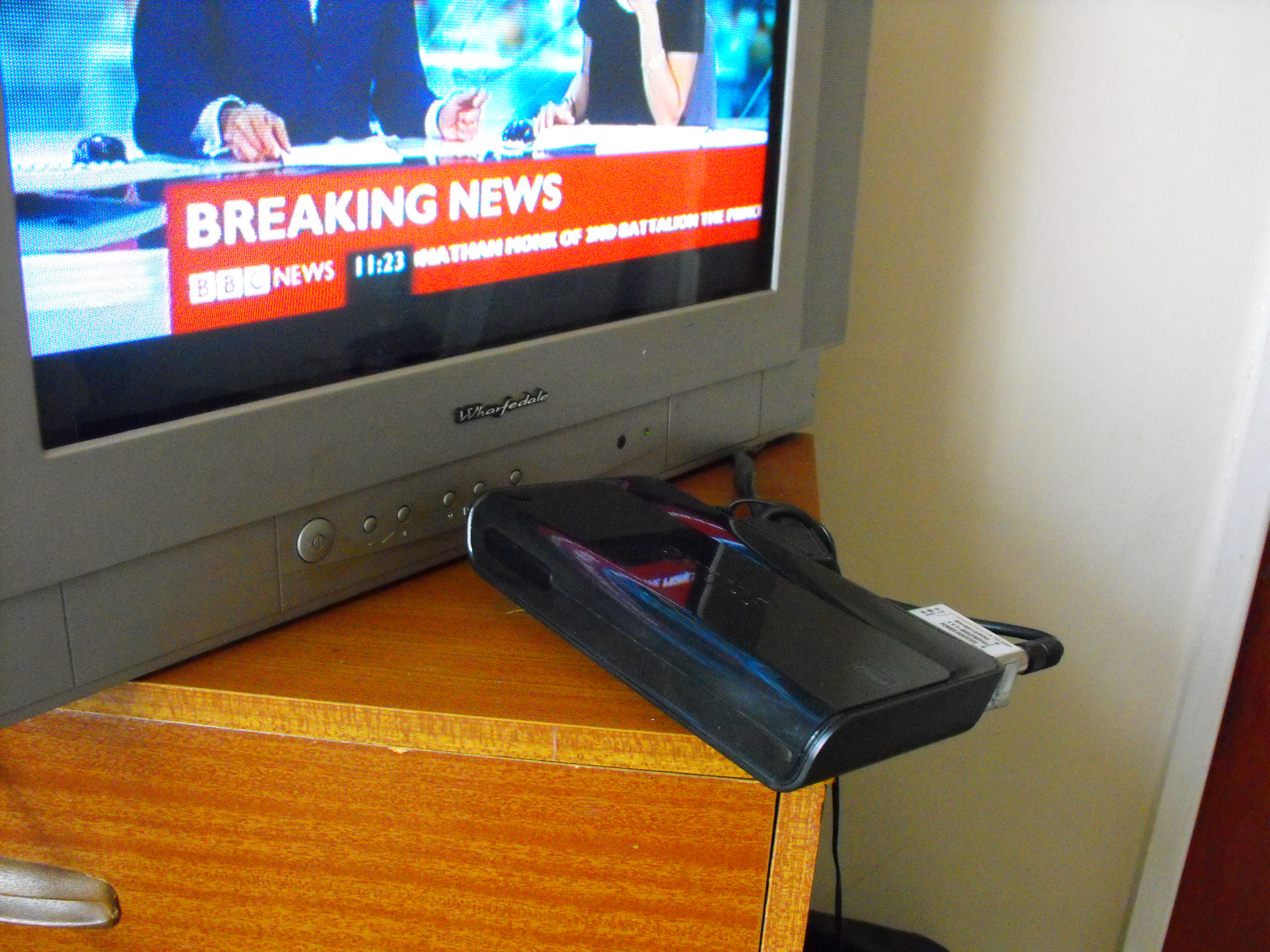
A Freeview receiver set-top box (Philips/Pace DTR 220) being used to receive digital television on an older analogue television set (branded Wharfedale)

Freeview is received using a television with an integrated digital tuner or an older analogue television with a suitable Freeview-branded set-top box.

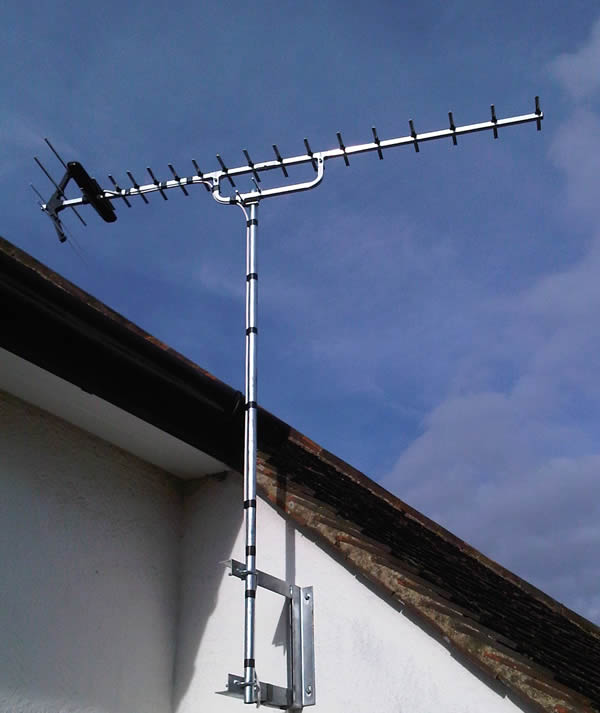
An outdoor aerial being used for Freeview transmissions

An aerial is required for viewing any broadcast television transmissions. For all transmissions indoor, loft-mounted, and external aerials are available. In regions of strong signal an indoor aerial may be adequate; in marginal areas a high-gain external aerial mounted high above the ground with an electronic amplifier at its top may be needed.

Aerial requirements for analogue (the old standard) and digital reception in the UK are identical; there is no such thing as a special "digital aerial", although installers and suppliers often falsely say one is necessary. As the signal degrades, the analogue picture degrades gradually, but the digital picture holds up well then suddenly becomes unwatchable; an aerial which gave poor analogue viewing may give unwatchable, rather than poor, digital viewing, and need replacing. An aerial intended for external use may be fitted indoors if there is space and the signal is strong enough.

== Services ==
The Digital TV Group, the industry association for digital television in the UK, is responsible for co-ordination between Freeview and other digital services.

The original Freeview was later expanded with additional facilities (Freeview+), high-definition channels (Freeview HD), and Internet connectivity (Freeview Play). All services remain available; the original Freeview equipment will work (unenhanced) in the same way it always did.

=== Freeview ===
The original Freeview service allowed a large number of digital television channels to be received on a compatible television receiver, set-top box, or personal video recorder. An electronic programme guide was available. Freeview channels are not encrypted and can be received by anyone in the UK. There is no additional charge to receive Freeview but it is a legal obligation to hold a current television licence to watch or record TV as it is being broadcast.

A subscription-based DTT service, Top Up TV, launched in March 2004. The Top Up TV service was not connected with the Freeview service, but ran alongside it on the DTT platform and was included in the Freeview EPG; programmes could be received on some Freeview set-top boxes and televisions equipped with a card slot or CI slot. The service also worked with existing ex-ONdigital / ITV Digital boxes that received the Freeview package; subscribers with those boxes had to insert their TopUp TV card into the slot which was originally used for inserting ONdigital / ITV Digital smartcards. Top Up TV was replaced in 2006, by a service that did not run on Freeview equipment. In October 2013, the TopUp TV service was closed down.

The Freeview logo certification for standard definition (SD) receivers and recorders was withdrawn in January 2017.

=== Freeview HD ===
Freeview HD comprises a number of high-definition versions of existing channels. It requires a different high-definition tuner, and does not supersede or replace standard Freeview.

On 20 August 2020, Freeview announced that it would phase out their Freeview HD brand in 2022.

==== Channels ====
With two channels (BBC HD and ITV HD) Freeview HD completed a "technical launch" on 2 December 2009 from Winter Hill (as a full power service) and Crystal Palace (as a reduced power temporary service). It operates on multiplex BBC B (aka Multiplex B or PSB3). The service was broadcast to all regions by the end of 2012. Channel 4 HD commenced test broadcasts on 25 March 2010 with an animated caption, ahead of its full launch on 30 March 2010, coinciding with the commercial launch of Freeview HD. S4C Clirlun launched on 30 April 2010, in Wales, where Channel 4 HD did not broadcast. STV HD launched in Scotland, where ITV HD does not broadcast, on 6 June 2010. S4C Clirlun closed on 1 December 2012, allowing Channel 4 HD to begin broadcasting in Wales.

Five HD was due to launch during 2010 but was unable to reach 'key criteria' to keep its slot. Spare allocation on multiplex B was handed over to the BBC, two years from the date when it was anticipated that further capacity on multiplex B would revert to the control of the BBC Trust. On 3 November 2010, BBC One HD launched on Freeview HD. Initially it was available in addition to the existing BBC HD channel, which continued to show the "best of the rest" of the BBC in HD. However, BBC HD was replaced by BBC Two HD on 26 March 2013.

Until 17 October 2011, the commercial public service broadcasters had the opportunity to apply to Ofcom to provide an additional HD service from between 28 November 2011 and 1 April 2012. Channel 5 HD was the sole applicant, with the aim of launching in spring or early summer 2012. On 15 December 2011, Channel 5 dropped its bid to take the fifth slot after being unable to resolve "issues of commercial importance". Subject to any future Ofcom decision to re-advertise the slot, the capacity will remain with the BBC and can be used by it for BBC services or services provided by a third party via a commercial arrangement. The BBC temporarily used the space to broadcast a high definition simulcast of their main Freeview red button feed for the duration of the 2012 Summer Olympics, followed by a channel from Channel 4 for the 2012 Summer Paralympics. On 13 June 2013, the BBC temporarily launched a high-definition red button stream in the vacant space.

On 16 July 2013, Ofcom announced that up to 10 new HD channels would be launched by early 2014, using new capacity made available by the digital switchover. This provided additional spectrum in the 600Mhz band for additional DVB-T2 multiplexes, reaching up to 70% of the UK population. At the same time, the BBC announced that they would provide five new HD channels due to the newly available capacity: BBC Three HD, BBC Four HD, CBBC HD, CBeebies HD and BBC News HD. BBC Three HD and CBBC HD launched to all viewers on 10 December 2013 using the capacity released by the Red Button HD service, and the other BBC channels launched in some regions, expanding to 70% UK coverage by June 2014.

Channel 5 HD launched on Freeview on 4 May 2016.

In June 2022, it was announced that the COM7 multiplex would be closing due to the licence expiring and the frequency used being released for 5G. The BBC announced that they have made provisions for a 6th slot for BBC Four HD and CBeebies HD to move into available capacity that has been newly identified on the PSB3 multiplex which the BBC operates. However, BBC News HD would stop being broadcast on Freeview.

==== Technical ====
The Digital TV Group publishes and maintains the UK technical specification for high-definition services on digital terrestrial television (Freeview) based on the new DVB-T2 standard. The specification is known as the D-book. Freeview HD is the first operational TV service in the world using the DVB-T2 standard. This standard is incompatible with DVB-T, and can only be received using compatible reception equipment. Some television receivers sold before the HD launch claimed to be "HD-ready", but this usually implies that the screen can display HD, rather than that DVB-T2 signals can be received – a suitable tuner (typically built into a STB or PVR) is additionally required. Freeview HD set-top boxes and televisions are available. To qualify for the Freeview HD logo, receivers will need to be IPTV-capable and display Freeview branding, including the logo, on the electronic programme guide screen. The Freeview HD trademark requirements state that any manufacturer applying for the Freeview HD logo should submit their product to the Digital TV Group's test centre (DTG Testing) for conformance testing.

On 2 February 2010, Vestel became the first manufacturer to gain Freeview HD certification, for the Vestel T8300 set top box. Humax released the first Freeview HD reception equipment, the Humax HD-FOX T2, on 13 February 2010.

It was announced on 10 February 2009, that the signal would be encoded with MPEG-4 AVC High Profile Level 4, which supports up to 1080i30/1080p30, so 1080p50 cannot be used. The system has been designed from the start to allow regional variations in the broadcast schedule. Services are statistically multiplexed – bandwidth is dynamically allocated between channels, depending on the complexity of the images – with the aim of maintaining a consistent quality, rather than a specific bit rate. Video for each channel can range between 3 Mbit/s and 17 Mbit/s. AAC or Dolby Digital Plus audio is transmitted at 384 kb/s for 5.1 surround sound, with stereo audio at 128–192 kbit/s; audio description takes up 64 kbit/s, subtitles 200 kbit/s and the data stream, for interactive applications 50 kbit/s. Recording sizes for Freeview HD television transmissions average around 3 GB per hour. Between 22 and 23 March 2011, an encoder software change allowed the Freeview version of BBC HD to automatically detect progressive material and change encoding mode appropriately, meaning the channel can switch to 1080p25. This was extended to all of the other Freeview HD channels in October 2011.

To ensure provision of audio description, broadcasters typically use the AAC codec. Hardware restrictions allow only a single type of audio decoder to operate at any one time, so the main audio and the audio description must use the same encoding family for them to be successfully combined at the receiver. In the case of BBC HD, the main audio is coded as AAC-LC and only the audio description is encoded as HE-AAC. Neither AAC nor Dolby Digital Plus codecs are supported by most home AV equipment, which typically accept Dolby Digital or DTS, leaving owners with stereo, rather than surround sound, output. Transcoding from AAC to Dolby Digital or DTS and multi-channel output via HDMI was not originally necessary for Freeview HD certification. As of June 2010 the DTG D-Book includes the requirement for mandatory transcoding when sending audio via S/PDIF, and for either transcoding or multi-channel PCM audio when sending it via HDMI in order for manufacturers to gain Freeview HD certification from April 2011. Thus equipment sold as Freeview HD before April 2011 may not deliver surround sound to audio equipment (some equipment may, but this is not mandatory); later equipment must be capable of surround sound compatible with most suitable audio equipment.

In early February 2011, it was announced that one million Freeview HD set-top boxes had been sold.

==== Copy protection ====
In August 2009, the BBC wrote to Ofcom after third-party content owners asked the BBC to undertake measures to ensure that all Freeview HD boxes would include copy protection systems as required by the Digital TV Group's D-Book, which sets technical standards for digital terrestrial television in the UK. The BBC proposed to ensure compliance with copy-protection standards on the upgraded Freeview HD multiplex by compressing the service information (SI) data, which receivers need to understand the TV services in the data stream. To encourage boxes to adopt copy protection, the BBC made its own look-up tables and decompression algorithm, necessary for decoding the EPG data on high-definition channels, available without charge only to manufacturers who implement the copy-protection technology. This technology would control the way HD films and TV shows are copied onto, for example Blu-ray discs, and shared with others over the internet. No restrictions will be placed on standard-definition services. In a formal written response, Ofcom principal advisor Greg Bensberg said that wording of the licence would probably need to be changed to reflect the fact that this new arrangement is permitted. The BBC had suggested that as an alternative to the SI compression scheme, the Freeview HD multiplex may have to adopt encryption. Bensberg said that it would appear "inappropriate to encrypt public service broadcast content on DTT".

On 14 June 2010, Ofcom agreed to allow the BBC to limit the full availability of its own and other broadcasters' high definition (HD) Freeview services to receivers that control how HD content can be used. Ofcom concluded that the decision to accept the BBC's request will deliver net benefits to licence-holders by ensuring they have access to the widest possible range of HD television content on DTT.

=== Freeview HD Recorder ===
Freeview HD Recorder (formerly Freeview+, originally named Freeview Playback) is the marketing name for Freeview-capable digital video recorders with some enhancements over the original Freeview.

All recorders are required to include the following features in addition to standard Freeview:

- At least eight-day electronic programme guide (EPG)
- Series link (one timer to record whole series)
- Record split programmes as one programme
- Offer to record related programme
- Record alternative showing if there is a time conflict
- Schedule changes updated in standby (e.g. scheduled recording starting early)
- Accurate Recording (AR, equivalent to PDC) – programmes are recorded based on signals from the broadcaster rather than scheduled time. (Since this is based on signals from the broadcaster, the broadcaster can prevent recording by sending nonsense signals as a form of copy protection, as already happens on music channels. However, this can be circumvented by specifying a timer recording instead of a programme recording or by connecting the receiver to a traditional videocassette recorder.)

Pace plc introduced the first DTT DVR in the UK in September 2002, called the Pace Twin. However, this was before the Freeview brand and its Playback and + marketing names were introduced.

=== Freeview Play ===
FreeviewPlay logo

Freeview Play combines the existing live television service with catch-up TV (BBC iPlayer, ITVX, STV Player, Channel 4, S4C Clic, 5, U, CBS Catchup Channels UK, Legend) on a variety of compatible TV and set-top boxes via the user's standard broadband Internet connection. Its main purpose is to provide easy access to catch-up services by scrolling backwards on the traditional electronic programming guide (EPG); YouView is a similar but competing combination of live Freeview and catch-up using the EPG.

The technology is an open standard, but with prominent Freeview Play branding. The service launched in October 2015, on compliant equipment, initially 2015 Panasonic TV receivers and Humax set-top boxes, including existing models with a software update. Other manufacturers were announcing new models "later this year [i.e. 2015]". The 2017 specification for Freeview Play includes support for HDR video using hybrid log–gamma (HLG), when playing on-demand broadband content.

=== Mobile app ===
In 2019, Freeview released an app for iOS and Android devices. The app provides a TV guide for a limited number (23) of the Freeview channels and the ability to watch them via the various channel player apps: BBC iPlayer, ITVX, STV Player, Channel 4, 5 and UKTV Play. The user must install these apps and register on them. The app was criticised when released as "simply a shiny TV guide app". As of 2026 it remains unable to play content, requiring the different player apps such as iPlayer.

== Usage share ==
As of 2004 there were more than 4 million homes in Britain that used Freeview. Cumulative sales of Freeview televisions and set-top boxes had passed 10 million by early 2006. The same year, 7.1 million households used Freeview thereby putting it ahead of households that relied only on analogue terrestrial although its total number was lower than the number of Sky satellite subscribers which had 7.7 million households. By March 2007, Freeview was in 8.2 million British homes (as a primary source of TV) which was more than Sky for the first time and made digital terrestrial the most popular delivery method of TV consumption for the first time. Britain was also one of the countries, along with France, Italy and Spain, in which digital terrestrial had a major usage share of total TV consumption in Europe as of 2009.

With government legislation ruling that all new TVs sold must have a compatible tuner, Freeview exposure only continued to expand. By the time the digital switchover ended in 2012, more than 10 million homes had Freeview or 20 million if second TV sets are included. As of 2020, the total number stood at about 18 million but the number of those relying entirely on Freeview was far lower. Figures in 2025-2026 show that Freeview is in 9.7 million British homes on main TV sets, but that 73% of these also consume TV content over the internet. 29% of total domestic TV viewers used the Freeview/DTT method.

While Freeview had been culturally dominant as of 2012, its usage share was soon challenged by changing habits. In 2014, total TV viewing made a decline while new sales of TV sets in Britain were also down because of a rise in tablet and smartphone use. 2015 marked the first year in which total viewership for the young (16-24) demographic in broadcast TV had dropped to only 50% because of the swift rising popularity of video on demand and other online video, particularly Netflix.

== See also ==
- YouView
- BT TV
- Virgin Media
- Freesat
- Freesat from Sky
- Now
- High-definition television in the United Kingdom
- Saorview
- Freely
