= Digital TV Group =

British media business association

DTG
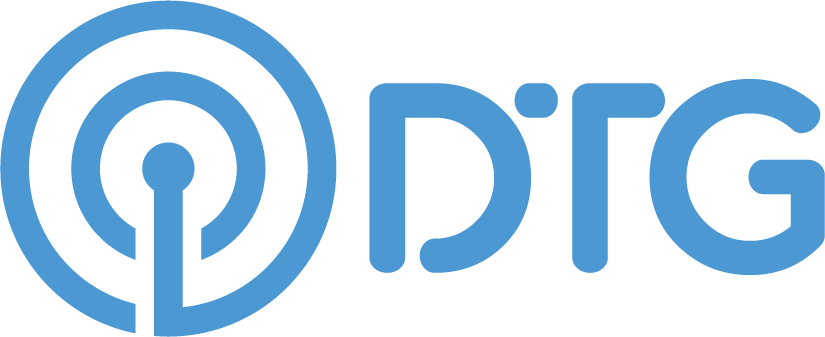
- Industry: Digital TV, technology, television, standards
- Founded: 1995
- Headquarters: London, United Kingdom, Vauxhall, London, England
- Area served: UK, Australia, New Zealand, South Africa, Ghana and Europe
- Key people: Simon Fell (Chairman); Richard Lindsay-Davies (CEO)
- Website: dtg.org.uk

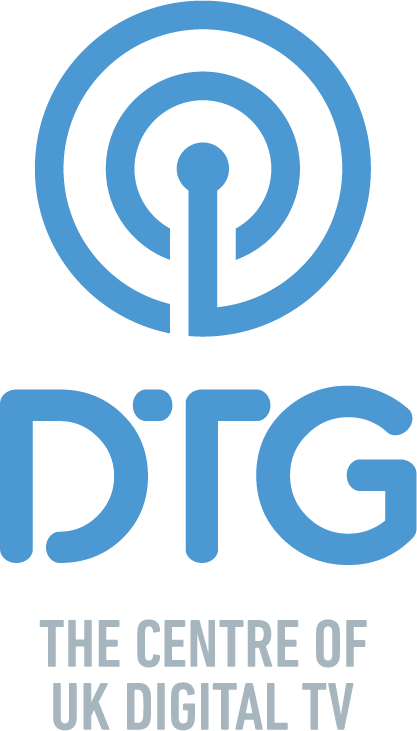
DTG - The centre of UK digital TV

The DTG (Digital TV Group) is the association for British digital television broadcasters and annually publish and maintain the technical specifications for digital terrestrial television (DTT) in the United Kingdom, which is known as the D-Book and is used by Freeview, Freeview HD, FreeSat and YouView. The association consists of over 120 UK and international members who can participate in DTG activities to varying degrees, depending on their category of membership.

== About ==
The DTG is the UK's centre for digital media technology. Since 1995, it has been vital to the distribution of TV in the UK – digital TV, interactive TV, the digital TV switchover, on-demand TV, HDTV and UHD TV. The DTG supports the development of pay-TV and other platforms.

=== History ===
The DTG was formed in 1995 by the BBC, BSkyB, BT Group, Channel 4, ITV, NTL Incorporated, Pace and Sony to set technical standards for the implementation of digital terrestrial television in the UK.

From these initial eight members, the DTG has grown to include over 120 UK and international members and played an important role in the success of the UK television industry.

=== Current work ===
The DTG, working with its members, has identified six priority television technologies. These are:

- Ultra high definition: working through the DTG UK UHD Forum.
- Digital terrestrial television: maintenance of the technical specification (D-Book).
- Video-to-mobile: improving the delivery and consumer experience of streaming video on portable devices using mobile data.
- Spectrum: driving full value by managing change/coexistence through supporting the introduction of new services.
- Connected TV: developing industry-wide ad insertion and home-networking systems.
- Accessibility: improving the experience of TV for viewers with accessibility requirements.

== Membership ==
The DTG is a membership association with four categories of membership:

1. Full Member for organisations who are active in the UK market.
2. New Entrant for new organisations in their first two years of operation.
3. World Member for organisations who are interested in, but not active, in the UK market.
4. Affiliate Member for charities, governments and regulators with an interest in the UK market and/or technical aspects of the television industry.

== DTG Testing ==
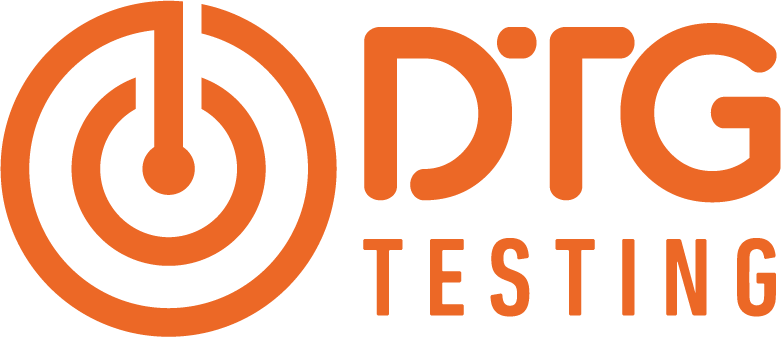
DTG Testing - Orange with Icon

The DTG owns and operates DTG Testing, an ISO 17025 accredited test laboratory in Central London. DTG Testing ensures that digital television products in the United Kingdom conform to the D-Book specification – a requirement of obtaining the Freeview trade mark licence.

DTG Testing also provide access to:

- the UK's over-air download channel
- a receiver collection (The Zoo) representing 95% of the UK's deployed free-to-air receivers
- the Test and Innovation Centre, incorporating the UK's largest commercial GTEM Cell.
- Consultancy
- Training

== The D-Book ==
The first edition of the DTG D-Book was written in 1996 when DVB-T was new and untried. From the outset, the D-Book was an implementation guideline and referenced fundamental standards where possible. But many of the component parts of the document had not then achieved stable international standards and the UK implementation was, therefore, reproduced in full. In subsequent editions, it has become possible to reference ETSI or other standards and the previous D-Book section simplified. However, the D-Book as an implementation guideline has become more important as non-UK based manufacturers have sought to introduce products to the UK market.

DTG Testing Ltd was established as an independent testing facility where manufacturers can bring prototype products for verification of their interoperability. Many manufacturers, both small and large, have discovered the advantage of revealing problems at this stage, rather than when they have large numbers of products in the shops or in peoples homes. As the complexity of the platform increases, the importance of interoperability and test and conformance is bigger than ever. The success of Freeview and Freeview Play continues and is largely down to the reliable products and services on the UK DTT platform.

The D-Book has successfully introduced High Definition and DVB-T2, in addition to supporting the transition of the DTT Platform out of the 700 MHz band which is planned for completion in 2020. D-Book 9 introduced HbbTV references for Freeview Play and the MHEG to HbbTV transition which included the introduction of support for HEVC and High Dynamic Range (HDR) for IP delivered services. D-Book 10 continued to support the developments of products and services with the introduction of Single Frequency Network (SFN) support for the migration of COM 7&8 T2 multiplexes into the 700 MHz band. In addition, through an analysis of broadcaster requirements, we removed HD/SD LCN switching and Broadcast Record lists.

D-Book 11 adopts a number of corrigenda to D-Book 10, defining the profile of UHD to be supported in compatible receivers for broadcast and bringing the HbbTV requirements up to date with recent work by the HbbTV Association and DVB. In recognition that Standard Definition receivers are no longer provided with a Trade Mark License in the UK, the SD receiver and recorder profiles have been removed and the chapter describing SCART and HDMI connectivity have been removed. Additionally, in the RF chapters (9 and 10), 700 MHz coexistence testing has been adopted in place of the 800 MHz coexistence testing to reflect future spectrum allocations. Overall the number of RF tests has been rationalised, by removing tests no longer required due to developments in receiver design.

== See also ==
- Digital television in the United Kingdom
