= Everyone TV =

Operator of the UK Freeview TV platform

Everyone TV Limited
- Formerly: Switchco Limited (2005–2006); Digital UK Limited (2006–2023)
- Type: Company limited by guarantee
- Founded: 13 April 2005; 21 years ago
- Headquarters: Everyone TV, Triptych Bankside, 185 Park Street, London SE1 9BL
- Area served: United Kingdom
- Key people: Jonathan Thompson, Chief Executive Officer
- Subsidiaries: Freeview; Freesat; Freely
- Website: everyonetv.co.uk

Everyone TV Limited (known as Switchco Limited from 2005 to 2006 and Digital UK Limited from 2006 to 2023) is a British television communications company owned by the BBC, ITV, Channel 4 and 5 that supports Freely (IPTV), Freeview (terrestrial) and Freesat (satellite) viewers and channels. It provides information about receiving terrestrial TV and advice on reception and equipment. The company also handles day-to-day technical management of the Freeview Electronic Programme Guide (EPG), allocates channel numbers and manages the launch of new services and multiplexes onto the platform. Everyone TV has been licensed by Ofcom as an EPG provider.

== History ==
From 2008 to 2012, Digital UK led the implementation of the digital switchover and oversaw the clearance of terrestrial TV services from the 800 MHz band of spectrum to prepare for the launch of 4G mobile broadband services. Everyone TV was formed on 13 April 2005 as SwitchCo, adopting the name Digital UK five months later. It is based in Mortimer Street in Fitzrovia, London.

The company completed the first pilot digital switchover in Whitehaven, Cumbria in 2007, and the last switchover was completed in Northern Ireland on 24 October 2012.

In 2015, Digital UK and Freeview developed Freeview Play, a connected TV service offering both live linear TV and on-demand content, including a range of popular catch-up players. The service is available on both TVs and set-top boxes and is now widely supported by more than 20 manufacturer brands. Everyone TV leads development of the Freeview Play product specification which is based on open standards, working with manufacturers and industry bodies.

In July 2021, Digital UK acquired Freesat the free-to-air satellite television platform from the BBC and ITV, and formally merged the company into Digital UK.

In December 2021, Channel 5 joined the venture, marking it as "the first time that the venture has been wholly owned by all four PSBs".

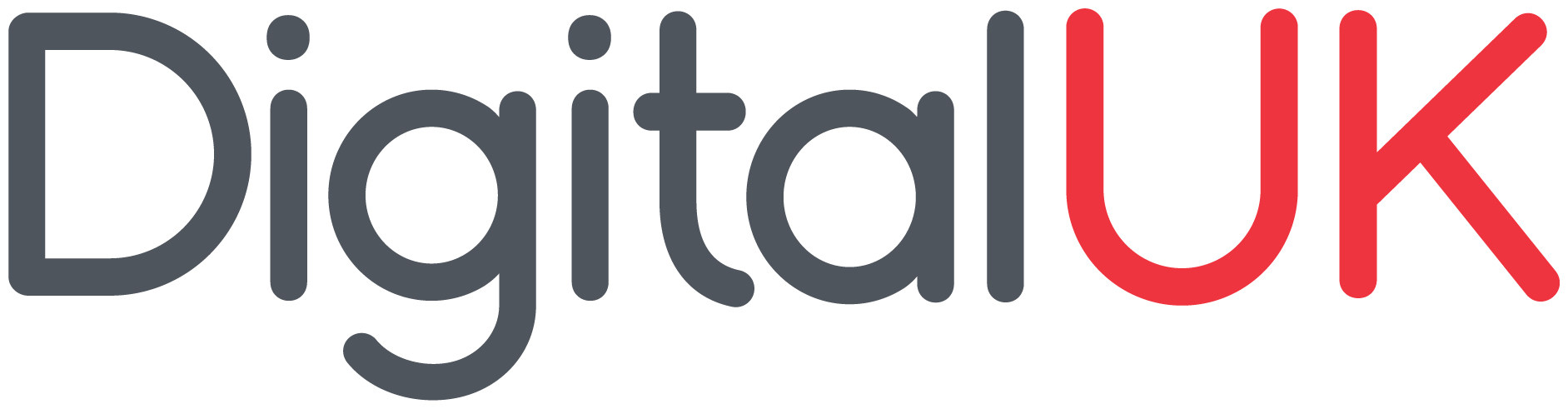
Digital UK logo, used until 2023 rebrand

In January 2023, Digital UK changed their name to "Everyone TV" to mark the milestone of both free-to-view UK television providers, Freeview and Freesat, becoming part of the same venture. The rebrand was officially announced at the Outside the Box 2023 conference.

In February 2024, a new joint venture streaming platform named Freely was confirmed to be launching in Q2 2024.

On 30 April 2024, Everyone TV launched Freely on Hisense televisions.

== Duties ==
=== Switchover communication ===
Digital UK was responsible for explaining the switchover from analogue to digital television broadcasting to the public and provided information to consumers through a website and a telephone helpline.

=== Transmitter work ===
One of the main reasons for switchover was to allow reception of digitals signals through normal aerials and digital terrestrial television, usually known in the UK as Freeview.

Before switchover began, around one quarter of the UK public could not receive Freeview, because the digital signal was broadcast at low power in order not to interfere with analogue television. By switching the analogue signal off, it became possible to increase Freeview coverage. When switchover was completed, 98.5% of UK homes were able to receive the service.

Extending Freeview involved re-engineering work at 1,150 transmitter sites across the country between 2008 and 2012. Digital UK was responsible for co-ordinating this work, which was carried out region by region.

=== Suppliers ===
Digital UK also worked with electrical manufacturers and retailers and promoted the 'digital tick' logo, a certification mark for the public that identifies TV equipment in stores that will work before, during and after digital switchover.

=== Switchover Help Scheme ===
Digital UK worked alongside the BBC-run Switchover Help Scheme, which helped older and disabled people convert one of their sets to digital.

== Previous shareholders ==
Until March 2021, Arqiva was a shareholder of Digital UK, but was asked to stand down by the other shareholders at the time. Arqiva subsequently went through a process of restructuring.

== See also ==
- Digital switchover dates in the United Kingdom
- Digital switchover
- Department for Business, Innovation and Skills
- Department for Culture, Media and Sport
- Ofcom
