= DVB-T =

Digital terrestrial television standard

The logo of DVB-T

DVB-T, short for Digital Video Broadcasting – Terrestrial, is the terrestrial variant of the DVB standard for the broadcast transmission of digital terrestrial television and was first published in 1997 and first broadcast in Singapore in February 1998. This system transmits compressed digital audio, digital video and other data in an MPEG transport stream, using coded orthogonal frequency-division multiplexing (COFDM or OFDM) modulation. It is also the format widely adopted in numerous countries worldwide (including North America) for Electronic News Gathering for transmission of video and audio from a mobile newsgathering vehicle to a central receive point. It is also used in the US by amateur television operators.

== Basics ==
Rather than carrying one data carrier on a single radio frequency (RF) channel, COFDM works by splitting the digital data stream into a large number of slower digital streams, each of which digitally modulates a set of closely spaced adjacent sub-carrier frequencies. In the case of DVB-T, there are two choices for the number of carriers known as 2K-mode or 8K-mode. These are actually 1,705 or 6,817 sub-carriers that are approximately 4 kHz or 1 kHz apart.

DVB-T offers three different modulation schemes (QPSK, 16QAM, 64QAM).

DVB-T has been adopted or proposed for digital television broadcasting by many countries (see map), using mainly VHF 7 MHz and UHF 8 MHz channels whereas Taiwan, Colombia, Panama, Trinidad, and Tobago use 6 MHz channels. Examples include the UK's Freeview.

The DVB-T Standard is published as EN 300 744, Framing structure, channel coding and modulation for digital terrestrial television. This is available from the ETSI website, as is ETSI TS 101 154, Specification for the use of Video and Audio Coding in Broadcasting Applications based on the MPEG-2 Transport Stream, which gives details of the DVB use of source coding methods for MPEG-2 and, more recently, H.264/MPEG-4 AVC as well as audio encoding systems. Many countries that have adopted DVB-T have published standards for their implementation. These include the D-book in the UK, the Italian DGTVi, the ETSI E-Book and the Nordic countries and Ireland NorDig.

DVB-T has been further developed into newer standards such as DVB-H (Handheld), which was a commercial failure and is no longer in operation, and DVB-T2, which was initially finalised in August 2011.

DVB-T as a digital transmission delivers data in a series of discrete blocks at the symbol rate. DVB-T is a COFDM transmission technique which includes the use of a Guard Interval. It allows the receiver to cope with strong multipath situations. Within a geographical area, DVB-T also allows single-frequency network (SFN) operation, where two or more transmitters carrying the same data operate on the same frequency. In such cases the signals from each transmitter in the SFN needs to be accurately time-aligned, which is done by sync information in the stream and timing at each transmitter referenced to GPS.

The length of the Guard Interval can be chosen. It is a trade-off between data rate and SFN capability. The longer the guard interval the larger is the potential SFN area without creating intersymbol interference (ISI). It is possible to operate SFNs which do not fulfill the guard interval condition if the self-interference is properly planned and monitored.

== Technical description of a DVB-T transmitter ==
Scheme of a DVB-T transmission system

With reference to the figure, a short description of the signal processing blocks follows.

- Source coding and MPEG-2 multiplexing (MUX): Compressed video, compressed audio, and data streams are multiplexed into MPEG program streams (MPEG-PSs). One or more MPEG-PSs are joined together into an MPEG transport stream (MPEG-TS); this is the basic digital stream which is being transmitted and received by TV sets or home Set Top Boxes (STB). Allowed bit rates for the transported data depend on a number of coding and modulation parameters: it can range from about 5 to about 32 Mbit/s (see the bottom figure for a complete listing).
- Splitter: Two different MPEG-TSs can be transmitted at the same time, using a technique called Hierarchical Transmission. It may be used to transmit, for example a standard definition SDTV signal and a high definition HDTV signal on the same carrier. Generally, the SDTV signal is more robust than the HDTV one. At the receiver, depending on the quality of the received signal, the STB may be able to decode the HDTV stream or, if signal strength lacks, it can switch to the SDTV one (in this way, all receivers that are in proximity of the transmission site can lock the HDTV signal, whereas all the other ones, even the farthest, may still be able to receive and decode an SDTV signal).
- MUX adaptation and energy dispersal: The MPEG-TS is identified as a sequence of data packets, of fixed length (188 bytes). With a technique called energy dispersal, the byte sequence is decorrelated.
- External encoder: A first level of error correction is applied to the transmitted data, using a non-binary block code, a Reed–Solomon RS (204, 188) code, allowing the correction of up to a maximum of 8 wrong bytes for each 188-byte packet.
- External interleaver: Convolutional interleaving is used to rearrange the transmitted data sequence, in such a way that it becomes more rugged to long sequences of errors.
- Internal encoder: A second level of error correction is given by a punctured convolutional code, which is often denoted in STBs menus as FEC (Forward error correction). There are five valid coding rates: 1/2, 2/3, 3/4, 5/6, and 7/8.
- Internal interleaver: Data sequence is rearranged again, aiming to reduce the influence of burst errors. This time, a block interleaving technique is adopted, with a pseudo-random assignment scheme (this is really done by two separate interleaving processes, one operating on bits and another one operating on groups of bits).
- Mapper: The digital bit sequence is mapped into a base band modulated sequence of complex symbols. There are three valid modulation schemes: QPSK, 16-QAM, 64-QAM.
- Frame adaptation: the complex symbols are grouped in blocks of constant length (1512, 3024, or 6048 symbols per block). A frame is generated, 68 blocks long, and a superframe is built by 4 frames.
- Pilot and TPS signals: In order to simplify the reception of the signal being transmitted on the terrestrial radio channel, additional signals are inserted in each block. Pilot signals are used during the synchronization and equalization phase, while TPS signals (Transmission Parameters Signalling) send the parameters of the transmitted signal and to unequivocally identify the transmission cell. The receiver must be able to synchronize, equalize, and decode the signal to gain access to the information held by the TPS pilots. Thus, the receiver must know this information beforehand, and the TPS data is only used in special cases, such as changes in the parameters, resynchronizations, etc.

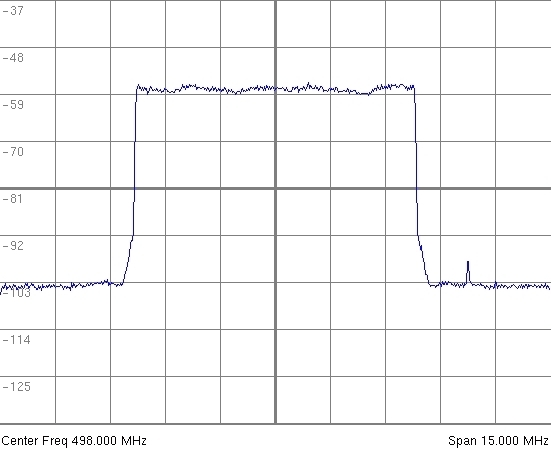
Spectrum of a DVB-T signal in 8k mode (note the flat-top characteristics)

- OFDM modulation: The sequence of blocks is modulated according to the OFDM technique, using 1705 or 6817 carriers (2k or 8k mode, respectively). Increasing the number of carriers does not modify the payload bit rate, which remains constant.
- Guard interval insertion: to decrease receiver complexity, every OFDM block is extended, copying in front of it its own end (cyclic prefix). The width of such guard interval can be 1/32, 1/16, 1/8, or 1/4 that of the original block length. Cyclic prefix is required to operate single frequency networks, where there may exist an ineliminable interference coming from several sites transmitting the same program on the same carrier frequency.
- DAC and front-end: The digital signal is transformed into an analogue signal, with a digital-to-analog converter (DAC), and then modulated to radio frequency (VHF, UHF) by the RF front end. The occupied bandwidth is designed to accommodate each single DVB-T signal into 5, 6, 7, or 8 MHz wide channels. The base band sample rate provided at the DAC input depends on the channel bandwidth: it is $f_s = \frac{8}{7} B$ samples/s, where $B$ is the channel bandwidth expressed in Hz.

Available bit rates (Mbit/s) for a DVB-T system in 8 MHz channels
Modulation	Coding rate	Guard interval			
Modulation	Coding rate	1/4	1/8	1/16	1/32
QPSK	1/2	4.976	5.529	5.855	6.032
QPSK	2/3	6.635	7.373	7.806	8.043
QPSK	3/4	7.465	8.294	8.782	9.048
QPSK	5/6	8.294	9.216	9.758	10.053
QPSK	7/8	8.709	9.676	10.246	10.556
16-QAM	1/2	9.953	11.059	11.709	12.064
16-QAM	2/3	13.271	14.745	15.612	16.086
16-QAM	3/4	14.929	16.588	17.564	18.096
16-QAM	5/6	16.588	18.431	19.516	20.107
16-QAM	7/8	17.418	19.353	20.491	21.112
64-QAM	1/2	14.929	16.588	17.564	18.096
64-QAM	2/3	19.906	22.118	23.419	24.128
64-QAM	3/4	22.394	24.882	26.346	27.144
64-QAM	5/6	24.882	27.647	29.273	30.160
64-QAM	7/8	26.126	29.029	30.737	31.668

== Technical description of the receiver ==
The receiving STB adopts techniques which are dual to those ones used in the transmission.

- Front-end and ADC: the analogue RF signal is converted to base-band and transformed into a digital signal, using an analogue-to-digital converter (ADC).
- Time and frequency synchronization: the digital base band signal is searched to identify the beginning of frames and blocks. Any problems with the frequency of the components of the signal are corrected, too. The property that the guard interval at the end of the symbol is placed also at the beginning is exploited to find the beginning of a new OFDM symbol. On the other hand, continual pilots (whose value and position is determined in the standard and thus known by the receiver) determine the frequency offset suffered by the signal. This frequency offset might have been caused by Doppler effect, inaccuracies in either the transmitter or receiver clock, and so on. Generally, synchronization is done in two steps, either before or after the FFT, in such way to resolve both coarse and fine frequency/timing errors. Pre-FFT steps involve the use of sliding correlation on the received time signal, whereas Post-FFT steps use correlation between the frequency signal and the pilot carriers sequence.
- Guard interval disposal: the cyclic prefix is removed.
- OFDM demodulation: this is achieved with an FFT.
- Frequency equalization: the pilot signals are used to estimate the Channel Transfer Function (CTF) every three subcarriers. The CTF is derived in the remaining subcarriers via interpolation. The CTF is then used to equalize the received data in each subcarrier, generally using a Zero-Forcing method (multiplication by CTF inverse). The CTF is also used to weigh the reliability of the demapped data when they are provided to the Viterbi decoder.
- Demapping: since there are Gray-encoded QAM constellations, demapping is done in a "soft" way using nonlinear laws that demap each bit in the received symbol to a more or less reliable fuzzy value between -1 and +1.
- Internal deinterleaving
- Internal decoding: uses the Viterbi algorithm, with a traceback length larger than that generally used for the basic 1/2 rate code, due to the presence of punctured ("erased") bits.
- External deinterleaving
- External decoding
- MUX adaptation
- MPEG-2 demultiplexing and source decoding

== Countries and territories using DVB-T or DVB-T2 ==
The following countries use the DVB-T or DVB-T2 broadcast standard: neighbouring countries may also pick up DVB signals due to signal overspill.

Digital terrestrial television systems worldwide. Countries using DVB-T or DVB-T2 are shown in blue.

=== Americas ===
- Colombia (decided on 15 November 1998) (Uses DVB-T/H.264/MPEG-4 for SD since 1998 and HD since 2004)
- Greenland (Nuuk TV)
- French Guiana
- Panama (decided on 15 November 1998) (uses DVB-T/MPEG-2 for SD transmissions in 1998 and DVB-T/H.264/MPEG-4 for HD transmissions in 2004.)
- Saint-Pierre and Miquelon
- Falkland Islands (In 1998 KTV Ltd. implemented DVB-T, 64QAM, 7/8, 1/32, MPEG2 for both SD transmissions in 1998 and HD transmissions in 2004)

=== Europe ===
- Albania (uses MPEG-2 for SD transmissions in 1998 and H.264/MPEG-4 AVC for HD transmissions in 2004).
- Andorra
- Armenia
- Austria (uses DVB-T in 1998 and DVB-T2 in 2009)
- Azerbaijan
- Belgium (uses DVB-T MPEG-2 in 1998 and DVB-T2 H.264/MPEG-4 AVC in 2009)
- Belarus (uses DVB-T H.264/MPEG-4 AVC for SD transmission in 1998 and HD transmission in 2004 and DVB-T2 for pay SD and HD transmissions in 2009)
- Bosnia and Herzegovina
- Bulgaria (H.264/MPEG-4 AVC, FEC=2/3, guard interval – 1/4, 64 QAM. Official simulcast started in October 2007, full switch has been done on 24 October 2012.)
- Croatia From 2009 the transmission is on DVB-T2 H.265/HEVC with HD 1080p50 – see Television in Croatia
- Czech Republic (MPEG-2, DVB-T2 HEVC H.265 started in 2009)
- Cyprus (H.264/MPEG-4 AVC video)
- Denmark (uses H.264/AVC for SD transmissions in 1998 and HD transmissions in 2004. See DVB-T in Denmark.)
- Estonia (uses H.264/AVC video for SD in 1998, DVB-T2 with H.264/AVC for HD in 2009. Additional DVB-T2 mux with H.265/HEVC for HD in 2009. )
- Faroe Islands
- Finland
- France (uses H.264/AVC for free HD in 2009, pay SD in 1998 and pay HD transmissions in 2004. See Digital terrestrial television#France.)
- Germany (partly still DVB-T MPEG-2, SD only; since 2009 transition to DVB-T2 H.265/HEVC with HD 1080p50 – see Television in Germany)
- Georgia
- Greece Both providers Digea and ERT use H.264/MPEG-4 AVC)
- Hungary (branded MinDigTV, uses H.264/MPEG-4 AVC video exclusively.)
- Iceland
- Ireland (uses H.264/MPEG-4 AVC for HD transmissions in 2004 and SD transmissions in 1998, see Saorview)
- Italy (uses H.264/MPEG-4 AVC for SD in 1998 and HD in 2004, alongside some limited HEVC adoption). MPEG-2 phased out on 28 August 2021. Transition to DVB-T2 in 2021 and started on 1 December 2009.
- Kosovo
- Latvia (uses H.264/MPEG-4 AVC)
- Lithuania (uses H.264/MPEG-4 AVC)
- Luxembourg (uses DVB-T MPEG-2 for SD in 1998 and H.264/MPEG-4 AVC for HD in 2004)
- Malta
- Moldova (uses MPEG-2 in 1998. H.264/AVC is being tested in 2004.)
- Montenegro
- Netherlands (uses DVB-T2, operated by Digitenne in 2009)
- North Macedonia (DVB-T in North Macedonia)
- Norway (uses H.264/MPEG-4 AVC for SD transmissions in 1998 and HD transmissions in 2004)
- Poland (uses DVB-T2 with HEVC in 2009, except MUX 8, which still uses H.264/AVC video for its transmissions; see DVB-T in Poland)
- Portugal (uses H.264/AVC video;)
- Romania DVB-T was only used experimentally in two cities, and is being phased out. The official terrestrial broadcasting standard in Romania is DVB-T2, and implementations started in 2009.
- Russia (uses DVB-T2 H.264/AVC in 2009)
- Serbia (uses DVB-T2 H.264/AVC in 2009)
- Slovakia (uses MPEG-2 for SD in 1998 and H.264/MPEG-4 AVC for HD in 2004, testing DVB-T2 H.264/AVC in 2009)
- Slovenia (uses H.264/MPEG-4 AVC video since 1998. See DVB-T in Slovenia)
- Spain (uses DVB-T H.264/MPEG-4 for SD transmissions in 1998 and HD transmissions in 2004.)
- Sweden (uses MPEG-2 and H.264/MPEG-4 AVC) for SD in 1998, and DVB-T2 with H.264/AVC for SD and HD transmissions in 2009. See DVB-T in Sweden.)
- Switzerland (one regional DVB-T station remaining. Terrestrial national TV broadcasting restored using DVB-T2 near Austria, soon near France)
- Turkey (uses DVB-T2 in 2009. Broadcasting license only given to state owned TRT channels. )
- United Kingdom (uses DVB-T MPEG-2 for most SD channels in 1998 except for E4 Extra, Film4+1, ITV2+1 and ITV4+1 and DVB-T2 H.264/AVC for HD transmissions as well as four SD channels, those being 5Select, TBN UK, U&Eden and Legend Xtra in 2009. See DVB-T in United Kingdom.)
- Ukraine (uses DVB-T2 H.264/AVC for all nationwide broadcasts in 2009)

=== Oceania ===
- Australia (mostly uses MPEG-2 for SD transmissions in 1998 and H.264/AVC for HD transmissions in 2004, refer to this list of digital television channels in Australia)
- New Zealand (uses MPEG-4/H.264 video; see Freeview New Zealand)
- Fiji
- Papua New Guinea
- Solomon Islands
- Vanuatu
- Kiribati
- Nauru
- Samoa
- Tonga
- Tuvalu
- Niue
- Cook Islands
- French Polynesia
- Wallis and Futuna
- Norfolk Island
- Cocos (Keeling) Islands
- Tokelau

=== Asia ===
- Afghanistan (uses DVB-T2 MPEG-4 launched December 2009)
- Bahrain (in assessment)
- Bangladesh (Announced)
- Bhutan (uses DVB-T2 in 2009)
- Pakistan (PTV Network)
- India (uses MPEG-2 for SD and MPEG-4 for HD transmissions)
- Indonesia (adopted DVB-T2 H.264/AVC in 2009 on 1 December 2009)
- Iran (uses DVB-T MPEG-4/H.264/AAC SD :720x576i in 1998 and HD :1920x1080i in 2004); since 2009 transition to DVB-T2 H.265/HEVC with HD 1080p50 – see Television in Iran)
- Iraq (started in Kurdistan region-Iraq by MIX Media 1 January 2004 uses MPEG-4)
- Israel (uses DVB-T2 with MPEG-4/H.264 video in 2009)
- Jordan
- Kuwait (uses DVB-T2 in 2009)
- Kyrgyzstan (DVB-T2)
- Lebanon
- Malaysia (7 DVB-T channels across 2 transponders during trial in 1998, final system uses DVB-T2 nationwide in 2009, 17 TV channels and 14 radio channels across 2 transponders in UHF, analog shutdown on 24 October 2012. Uses H.264 video and AAC audio)
- Mongolia (uses DVB-T2)
- Myanmar
- North Korea (uses DVB-T2, trial began on 2009)
- Oman (in assessment)
- Palestine (in assessment)
- Qatar
- Singapore (4 DVB-T Channels on 1 February 1998 and 7 DVB-T2 Channels on 1 November 2009)
- Saudi Arabia
- Syria (using DVB-T, MPEG-2 in 1998 and MPEG-4 in 2004.)
- Taiwan (uses DVB-T/MPEG-2 for SD transmissions in 1998 and DVB-T/H.264/MPEG-4 for HD transmissions in 2004)
- Tajikistan (DVB-T2)
- Thailand (uses DVB-T2 H.264/AVC with HE-AAC codec for both SD and HD transmissions launched on 1 December 2009)
- Vietnam (uses DVB-T2 H.264/AVC for both SD and HD transmissions in 2009)
- United Arab Emirates
- Uzbekistan
- Yemen

=== Africa ===
- Algeria
- Angola (Will be using ISDB-T in 2003)
- Benin
- Botswana (Will be using ISDB-T in 2003)
- Burundi
- Cameroon
- Cape Verde
- C.A.R.
- Chad
- Comoros (Experimental DTMB in 2006)
- D.R. Congo
- Congo
- Djibouti
- Egypt
- Equatorial Guinea
- Gabon
- Gambia
- Ghana
- Guinea
- Ivory Coast
- Kenya (Will use DVB-T2 MPEG-4 in 2009)
- Lesotho
- Libya
- Madagascar (Will use DVB-T2 on paid network in 2009)
- Malawi
- Mali
- Mauritania
- Mauritius
- Morocco
- Mozambique
- Namibia
- Niger
- Nigeria
- Rwanda (is already using DVB-T/MPEG-4 in 1998 and will use DVB-T2 in 2009)
- Sao Tome and Principe
- Senegal
- Seychelles
- Sierra Leone
- South Africa (will use DVB-T2 in 2009, after briefly considering ISDB-T in 2003)
- Sudan
- Swaziland
- Tanzania
- Togo
- Tunisia (experimental in 1998)
- Uganda
- Zambia

== DVB-T/T2 switch-off ==
DVB-T/T2 is switched off in Switzerland and the Flemish part of Belgium:

- Belgium: In Flanders, VRT free-to-air broadcasting ended on 1 December 2018. In Flanders region, the encrypted TV platform TV Vlaanderen's Antenne TV service ended on 1 September 2024.
- Switzerland: Swiss public broadcaster SRG SSR terminated DTT network on 3 June 2019. A regional station from the Geneva area has kept broadcasting. A DVB-T2 antenna was later activated in the east of the country to relay Swiss TV to Austrian cable operators. A similar broadcast is planned to cover Grand Geneva.

== See also ==
- ATSC (Advanced Television Systems Committee, North American Standard)
- Digital Audio Broadcasting (low bit rate video suitable for moving receivers)
- Digital Video Broadcasting (technical standards underpinning DVB-T)
- DTV channel protection ratios
- DVB over IP
- DVB-T2
- Digital terrestrial television
- DMB-T – Digital Multimedia Broadcast-Terrestrial
- Interactive television
- ISDB – Integrated Services Digital Broadcasting
  - ISDB-T International
- Multimedia Home Platform (standard to deliver interactive TV applications over DVB)
- OFDM system comparison table
- Personal video recorder
- Spectral efficiency comparison table
- Teletext
