= Timeline of S4C =

This is a timeline of the history of S4C (Welsh pronunciation: [ˌɛs ˌpɛdwar ˈɛk], Sianel Pedwar Cymru, meaning Channel Four Wales), originally the fourth-oldest terrestrial television channel in Wales. Until 2010 it carried a mixture of Welsh language programmes and programmes from Channel 4 which was not broadcast on analogue TV in Wales. In 2010, Channel 4 became available in Wales on all platforms and S4C became a Welsh-language-only channel.

== 1970s ==
- 1974
  - 26 September – BBC Wales launches the Welsh language soap opera Pobol y Cwm.
- 1975
  - No events.
- 1976
  - No events.
- 1977
  - 3 February – The Annan Committee on the future of broadcasting recommends the establishment of a fourth independent television channel.
- 1978
  - No events.
- 1979
  - Both the Conservative and Labour parties promise that the fourth television channel in Wales will be a Welsh-language fourth channel, if elected to government in the 1979 general election.
  - May – The new Conservative government decides against a Welsh fourth channel and suggests that, except for an occasional opt-out provided by HTV Wales, the fourth channel service should be the same as that offered in the rest of the UK. This leads to acts of civil disobedience, including refusals to pay the television licence fee and sit-ins in BBC and HTV studios and some attacks on TV transmitters in Welsh-speaking areas.

== 1980s ==
- 1980
  - October – The government reverses its position on a separate Welsh language service for Wales following opposition from the public and Welsh politicians, including a threat from the former president of Plaid Cymru, Gwynfor Evans, to go on hunger strike. The Welsh Fourth Channel Authority will be established to be responsible for Welsh output on the new channel, broadcast mainly during peak hours, with as many Channel 4 programmes as possible appearing at other times. 22–25 hours of Welsh programming would be broadcast. The majority of the output would come from the BBC and from HTV Wales although independent producers would provide some programming.
  - 13 November – The Broadcasting Act 1980 paves the way for a fourth television channel in the UK.
- 1981
  - The S4C Authority is founded to oversee the management of the Welsh-language television channel S4C.
- 1982
  - 31 October – Programmes in Welsh are broadcast on BBC Wales and HTV Cymru Wales for the final time.
  - 1 November
    - At 6pm, Sianel 4 Cymru (S4C) launches as Wales' fourth channel. Its Welsh-language programmes will be made by BBC Wales, HTV Cymru Wales and independent production companies. Programmes include a weeknight BBC-produced news programme called Newyddion. Soap opera Pobol y Cwm transfers from BBC Wales to the new channel.
    - S4C launches its own pull-out weekly listings supplement magazine Sbec. It is distributed free with the Wales edition of TV Times. It contains full details of schedules in both Welsh and English. The children's programming block Clwb S4C also launches.
  - 2 November – Channel 4 launches across England, Scotland and Northern Ireland. S4C provides a sample of Channel 4's output by broadcasting Channel 4 programming at off-peak times.
- 1983
  - No events.
- 1984
  - No events.
- 1985
  - No events.
- 1986
  - No events.
- 1987
  - 25 May – S4C launches a computer-generated ident featuring an animation of the streamlined S4C logo and the colours of the logo of blue, green and red.
  - 14 September – ITV Schools transfers to the fourth channel and are carried by S4C. S4C uses its own presentation and opts out of the Channel 4 schedule at various points to broadcast schools programmes in Welsh.
- 1988
  - 5 September – Sports programme Sgorio launches. It is set up to provide highlights of European football although other sports are included within it.
  - Autumn – For a brief period, S4C stops showing Channel 4's Business Daily. The programme returns by the end of the year, but is shown with a one-hour time delay.
- 1989
  - 3 April – Breakfast television comes to S4C when the channel carries Channel 4's breakfast programme The Channel Four Daily. It is broadcast in its entirety with no Welsh language opt-outs.

== 1990s ==
- 1990
  - April – Stereo broadcasts begin in Wales following the switching on of NICAM digital stereo from the Wenvoe transmitting station.
  - 7 September – A new ident is introduced, depicting a piece of Welsh slate with colours blue, green and red washing over the letters S4C.
  - 17 September – S4C’s children’s block is renamed from Clwb S4C to Slot Meithrin.
- 1991
  - No events.
- 1992
  - 14 September – S4C's Newyddion news programme moves to the 6pm programme slot.
- 1993
  - 1 June – S4C introduces a new series of idents which depict inanimate objects as having characteristics of dragons (such as flight or breathing fire), as a reference to the red dragon on the flag of Wales.
  - 20 September – The schools programmes shown on S4C now carries its own branding, S4C Ysgollon.
- 1994
  - No events.
- 1995
  - 10 February – S4C introduces a new logo featuring a tilde representing a dragon with a flame next to the "C" as if were breathing fire.
  - 11 September – S4C launches its second Welsh-language soap Rownd a Rownd.
- 1996
  - No events.
- 1997
  - BBC Wales launches a Welsh-language rugby union programme Clwb Rygbi on S4C.
  - Ahead of the launch of digital terrestrial television, S4C, United News and Media and NTL set up S4C Digital Networks (each owned one-third of the company) and bid for the right to operate Multiplex A. They were the only bidder and after having their business plan approved, were awarded the licence to operate Multiplex A by the Independent Television Commission.
- 1998
  - 17 September – S4C’s children’s block is renamed from Slot Meithrin to Planed Plant.
  - 1 November – S4C Digidol launches.
  - 15 November – The public launch of digital terrestrial TV in the UK takes place and this sees the launch of SDN. SDN chooses to rent out their capacity to various free and subscription channels, including to the BBC and to ITV which in the year 2000 uses the capacity to launch ITV Select, although S4C did keep their gifted space in Wales to allow it to launch S4C2.
- 1999
  - 15 September
    - S4C2 launches. It broadcasts coverage of the National Assembly for Wales and extended coverage of events being shown on S4C, including the National Eisteddfod of Wales, the Urdd National Eisteddfod and the Royal Welsh Show.
    - S4C modifies its presentation of schools programmes in order to accommodate the launch of widescreen broadcasting.
  - BBC Cymru Wales launches short weekday lunchtime, mid-afternoon and early evening bulletins on S4C.

== 2000s ==
- 2000
  - 6 June – S4C launches the Chwaraeon/Sport 2000 promotional branding with the ancient history theme, featuring Welsh sport personalities and presenters recreating classic works of Greek and Roman art masterpieces with the "you can see more" tagline.
- 2001
  - No events.
- 2002
  - No events.
- 2003
  - No events.
- 2004
  - August – S4C picks up the secondary rights to the Welsh football team and well as the rights to Welsh domestic football.
- 2005
  - 27 April – S4C sells its share of to ITV plc for approximately £34million. However, it retained the half-multiplex as of right in Wales.
- 2006
  - No events.
- 2007
  - 18 January – A new corporate logo launched with new idents and branding. Developed by the London-based firm Proud Creative, the new look is intended to portray S4C as a more "contemporary" multi-platform broadcaster and downplayed "traditional" Welsh imagery such as dragons. Its idents were filmed around various parts of the country and themed around magnetism—representing the "uncontrollable attraction" of Welsh people and their "emotional affinity to the homeland, whether near or far".
- 2008
  - 20 June - S4C broadcasts the final day of Ysgolion - Welsh schools programming and so does Planed Plant Bach.
  - 23 June – S4C launches a daily morning children’s programming block called Cyw.
- 2009
  - 9 September
    - The Digital switchover begins in Wales when the Kilvey Hill transmitter is the first of eight main transmitters to complete it.
    - S4C's teletext service Sbectel closes down.
    - Three weekday afternoon five-minute news bulletins are launched on S4C.

== 2010s ==
- 2010
  - January – Coverage of proceedings from the Senedd are moved from S4C2 to the new BBC Democracy Live website.
  - 31 March – Digital switchover is completed in Wales when the analogue transmissions at Wenvoe are switched off. Consequently, S4C begins broadcasting solely in Welsh and the channel no longer carries Channel 4 programmes due to their becoming available full-time across all of Wales for the first time.
  - 26 April – S4C launches Stwnsh, aimed at children between the ages of seven and thirteen, it broadcasts on weekdays between 4pm and 6pm and on Saturday mornings between 9am and 11am. It replaces Planed Plant which had been on the air since 1998.
  - 19 July – S4C begins broadcasting in high definition when it launches a channel called 'Clirlun'.
  - August – S4C beings showing a live match from the Welsh Premier League each Saturday afternoon. The live match replaces a weekly 30-minute highlights programme.
  - 16 September – S4C2 is removed from Sky.
  - 20 October – The Chancellor of the Exchequer, George Osborne, announces that part of the responsibility for funding S4C is to be transferred to the BBC.
  - October – S4C2 is removed from Virgin Media.
  - 30 November – S4C2 is removed from Freeview.
  - 6 December – S4C2 ceases broadcasting when it is removed from the Freesat platform.
- 2011
  - 14 January – The S4C Authority confirms it has closed S4C2 due to budget cuts imposed on it by the Department of Culture, Media and Sport.
  - S4C launches a catch-up service called Clic.
- 2012
  - 1 December – S4C Clirlun closes and the following day Channel 4 HD takes over its transmission capacity.
- 2013
  - 1 April – Responsibility for the funding of S4C begins to transfer to the BBC.
- 2014
  - March – S4C announces that it will be relocating its headquarters to Carmarthen.
  - 10 April – S4C introduces a new S4C logo and brand. The new design is developed around a concept of providing "context" to S4C's target audience and programming.
  - December – S4C's programmes and live-streaming become available on the BBC's catch-up service, BBC iPlayer.
- 2015
  - September – S4C begins showing one live match from each round of rugby union's Pro 12 competition. It had previously shown coverage in highlights form since the league's conception as the Celtic League in 2001.
- 2016
  - 7 June – S4C resumes high definition broadcasting.
  - 7 September – It is agreed that the BBC will provide £74.5m a year funding to S4C from the licence fee until 2022.
- 2017
  - No events.
- 2018
  - 29 March – The UK Government announces that it will continue providing £6.72m of funding for S4C until 2020 with the aim of S4C being funded wholly from the licence fee from 2022. This will see S4C's funding being decided as part of the licence fee settlement, for 10 year periods.
  - September – S4C starts the process of relocating to its new headquarters in Carmarthen. An office in Cardiff was retained for technical purposes until full change over to the new BBC Wales Headquarters.
- 2019
  - No events.

== 2020s ==
- 2020
  - 16 June – Pobol y Cwm begins a transmission break due to the spread of COVID-19. The number of episodes being broadcast would be also be reduced from four to two a week "so that we can ensure the audience can continue to enjoy Pobol y Cwm in their homes for as long as possible."
  - 8 September – Pobol y Cwm returns with episodes airing twice a week.
- 2021
  - 27 January – S4C's Presentation, Library, Promotion and Commercial departments move to BBC Wales headquarters in Central Square, Cardiff.
- 2022
  - No events.
- 2023
  - 2 May – An independent investigation is launched after the broadcasting union BECTU makes allegations of "bullying and a toxic culture" at S4C.
- 2024
  - 14 March – Former Conservative MP Guto Bebb is appointed interim chair.
- 2025
  - 16 April – Former broadcast journalist and Labour politician Delyth Evans is appointed chair of S4C.
  - 10 September – S4C announces a new five-year strategy that includes putting more emphasis on "digital first" content to attract younger viewers.
  - 18 September – Llinos Griffin-Williams, who was dismissed as the boss of S4C in 2023 for allegedly being drunk and verbally abusive, launches a legal case against the channel for compensation worth several hundred thousand pounds.
  - 10 October – S4C reaches an out-of-court settlement with its former boss, Sian Doyle.

== See also ==
- Timeline of ITV in Wales
- Timeline of television in Wales
- Timeline of Channel 4
