= Timeline of television in Wales =

This is a timeline of the history of television in Wales. It does not include events that affect the whole UK.

== 1950s ==
- 1952
  - 15 August – Television becomes available in Wales for the first time following the switching on of the Wenvoe transmitting station.
- 1956
  - 14 October – The Blaenplwyf transmitting station enters service, providing television signals to the Cardigan Bay area.
  - 26 October – Television Wales and the West is awarded the ITV franchise for South Wales and the West of England.
- 1957
  - The BBC launches a daily five minute news bulletin for Wales.
- 1958
  - 14 January – At 4.45pm, TWW starts broadcasting.
  - The Llanddona transmitting station is switched on, bringing television to the isle of Anglesey and other parts of the north Wales coast.
- 1959
  - No events.

== 1960s ==
- 1960
  - No events.
- 1961
  - Following pressure from Welsh-speaking businessmen, the ITA offers and then awards a licence covering a new North and West Wales region, awarding the contract to Wales West and North Television.
  - BBC Wales launches a Welsh language news bulletin called Heddiw.
- 1962
  - 14 September – Wales (West and North) Television launches as Teledu Cymru. The company uses its own transmitter at Arfon rather than the BBC's mast at Llandonna.
  - 17 September – BBC Wales launches Wales Today. The programme is seen by viewers in both Wales and the west of England.
- 1963
  - 28 January – The Moel-y-Parc transmitting station is switched on, bringing ITV programmes to north east Wales. The BBC begins broadcasting from that transmitter in 1965.
  - Delays in switching on the Arfon and Moel-y-Parc transmitters destroys the finances of WWN. Free programming from the ITV network, plus other support from its neighbours ABC, ATV and TWW just about kept the ship afloat, but Granada decided to dispense with its productions in the Welsh language, and the loss of this programming stream proved fatal to WWN.
- 1964
  - 26 January – Wales (West and North) Television stops broadcasting after going bankrupt. TWW offers a generous package to WWN's shareholders, in order to gain control of the territory, and kept the Teledu Cymru name on the air as a service separate from its existing service to South Wales and the West.
  - 9 February – Following the creation of separate regions for Wales and the west of England, BBC Cymru Wales is officially launched and output includes an extended news bulletin called Wales Today – a 25-minute programme broadcast only to Wales. 1964 also sees the launch of current affairs series Week In Week Out.
- 1965
  - For the first time, TWW is able to provide separate programming for he whole of Wales and the West of England, due to the addition of a second VHF transmitter to the St Hilary mast to extend the Teledu Cymru network into South East Wales. Viewers in South Wales are able to receive both services.
  - 12 September – BBC Two Wales begins broadcasting.
- 1966
  - BBC Wales moves to new studios at Broadcasting House, Cardiff.
- 1967
  - TWW loses its licence to the Harlech Consortium. TWW unsuccessfully fought the ITA's decision, both formally and through the press. However, the ITA remained resolute that it is legally entitled to remove any contract at any time for any reason.
  - The Kilvey Hill transmitting station enters service. It improves reception for people living in Swansea, Neath and Port Talbot.
- 1968
  - 4 March – TWW stops broadcasting five months before its contract was due to expire, selling the final months of airtime to Harlech. However the new contractor is not yet ready to go on air, so the ITA provides an interim service called Independent Television Service for Wales and the West.
  - 20 May – Harlech Television takes over the Wales and West of England franchise just over two months ahead of the planned hand-over date. It launches two news magazines – Y Dydd in the Welsh language and Report Wales in English.
  - August – A technicians strike forces ITV off the air for several weeks, although management launch a temporary ITV Emergency National Service with no regional variations.
- 1969
  - No events.

== 1970s ==
- 1970
  - BBC Cymru Wales and HTV start broadcasting in colour.
  - 6 April – To coincide with its colour launch, Harlech Television becomes known on air as HTV. The service for Wales becomes known as HTV Cymru Wales. (HTV's "general" 405-line VHF service for South Wales and the West of England continues as a separate service.)
- 1971–1973
  - No events.
- 1974
  - 26 September – BBC Cymru Wales launches the Welsh language soap opera Pobol y Cwm.
- 1975
  - No events.
- 1976
  - No events.
- 1977
  - 3 February – The Annan Committee on the future of broadcasting recommends the establishment of a fourth independent television channel.
- 1978
  - No events.
- 1979
  - Both the Conservative and Labour parties promise that the fourth television channel in Wales will be a Welsh-language fourth channel, if elected to government in the 1979 general election. However the new Conservative government decides against a Welsh fourth channel, and suggests that, except for an occasional opt-out, the service should be the same as that offered in the rest of the UK. This leads to acts of civil disobedience, including refusals to pay the television licence fee and sit-ins in BBC and HTV studios and some attacks on TV transmitters in Welsh-speaking areas.
  - 10 August – The ten week ITV strike forces HTV off the air. The strike ends on 24 October.

== 1980s ==
- 1980
  - 17 September – The government reverses its position on a separate Welsh language service for Wales following opposition from the public and Welsh politicians, including a threat from the former president of Plaid Cymru, Gwynfor Evans, to go on hunger strike and the idea is given the green light. This leads to the establishment of the Welsh Fourth Channel Authority.
  - 13 November – The Broadcasting Act 1980 paves the way for a fourth television channel in the UK.
- 1981
  - No events.
- 1982
  - 23 September – HTV launches a weekly current affairs programme Wales This Week. To this day, the programme continues to be broadcast.
  - October – Heddiw is broadcast for the final time.
  - 31 October – Programmes in Welsh are broadcast on BBC Wales and HTV Cymru Wales for the final time. The two broadcasters will continue to make Welsh-language programmes for broadcast on S4C.
  - 1 November – Sianel 4 Cymru (S4C) launches as Wales' fourth channel. Programmes include a weeknight BBC-produced news programme called Newyddion. Soap opera Pobol y Cwm transfers from BBC Wales to the new channel.
  - 2 November – Channel 4 launches across England, Scotland and Northern Ireland. In Wales, some Channel 4 output is broadcast at off-peak times on S4C.
  - November – HTV launches a Welsh-language current affairs series on S4C called Y Byd ar Bedwar (The World on Four).
- 1983
  - 17 January – Breakfast Time, Britain's first breakfast show, launches on BBC1. The new service includes four opt-outs which allow BBC Wales to broadcast its own news bulletin.
  - 1 February – ITV’s breakfast television service TV-am launches. It is a UK-wide service and therefore contains no Wales-specific content.
  - BBC Wales launches the BBC Cardiff Singer of the World competition.
- 1984
  - 3 September – Wales Today moves to the earlier time of 5.35 pm – one hour earlier than most of its counterpart BBC news programmes elsewhere in the UK.
- 1985
  - 3 January – The last day of transmission using the 405-lines system, ending HTV's "general" service to South Wales and the West of England.
- 1986
  - No events.
- 1987
  - No events.
- 1988
  - 22 August – HTV begins 24-hour broadcasting.
  - 5 September – BBC's main evening news programme Wales Today moves to the 6.30 pm timeslot.
- 1989
  - No events.

== 1990s ==
- 1990
  - April – Stereo broadcasts begin in Wales following the switching on of NICAM digital stereo from the Wenvoe transmitting station.
- 1991
  - 16 October – HTV retains its licence to broadcast when it bids the highest amount for the right to broadcast to Wales from a total of four applicants.
- 1992
  - 14 September – S4C's Newyddion news programme moves to the 6pm programme slot.
- 1993
  - No events.
- 1994
  - 28 February – Wales at Six is replaced by Wales Tonight.
- 1995
  - 10 September – BBC Wales relaunches its rugby union coverage under the name of Scrum V. It replaces Rugby Special Wales.
  - 11 September – S4C launches its second Welsh-language soap, Rownd a Rownd.
- 1996
  - No events.
- 1997
  - BBC Wales launches a Welsh-language rugby union programme Clwb Rygbi on S4C.
- 1998
  - 23 September – The BBC launches a digital-only channel, BBC Choice, and this features a weeknight output for Wales.
  - 1 November – S4C Digidol launches.
  - 15 November – The public launch of digital terrestrial TV in the UK takes place.
- 1999
  - 8 March – Wales Tonight is renamed HTV Wales News.
  - 15 September – S4C2 launches. It broadcasts coverage of the National Assembly for Wales and extended coverage of events being shown on S4C.
  - BBC Cymru Wales launches short weekday lunchtime, mid afternoon and early evening bulletins on S4C.

== 2000s ==
- 2000
  - 6 June – S4C launches the Chwaraeon/Sport 2000 promotional branding with the ancient history theme, featuring Welsh sport personalities and presenters to recreating classic works of Greek and Roman art masterpieces, bearing under the "you can see more" tagline. The idents later win three silver awards in the "Best In-House Promo" at the world Promax Awards ceremony.
- 2001
  - 30 March – BBC Choice Wales ends.
  - 5 November – BBC 2W is launched. It provides weeknight programmes in English for Wales for digital viewers.
- 2002
  - 28 October – HTV's service in Wales is renamed ITV1 Wales.
- 2003
  - No events.
- 2004
  - 2 February – HTV News is renamed ITV Wales News.
- 2005
  - The Ferryside television relay station in Carmarthenshire is chosen as the site of the UK's experimental switchover trial, and as such becomes the first UK TV transmitter to be converted to digital transmission.
  - 14 November — ITV Wales News is renamed back to Wales Tonight.
- 2006
  - 29 December – HTV Ltd is renamed ITV Wales & West Ltd.
- 2007
  - No events.
- 2008
  - May – Wales on Saturday is broadcast on BBC One Wales for the final time. Originally the name of BBC Wales' Saturday afternoon news and sport programme, since 2001 it had served as a Welsh sports results programme, broadcast in place of Final Score.
  - 23 June – S4C launches a daily morning children’s programming block called Cyw.
- 2009
  - 2 January – BBC 2W closes as part of plans to achieve 3% savings at BBC Cymru Wales. Consequently, the digital version becomes a simulcast of BBC Two on analogue with fewer Wales opt-outs.
  - 9 September –
    - Digital switchover begins in Wales when the Kilvey Hill transmitter is the first of eight main transmitters to complete digital switchover.
    - S4C's teletext service Sbectel closes down.
  - Three weekday afternoon five-minute news bulletins are launched on S4C.

== 2010s ==
- 2010
  - January – Coverage of proceedings from the Senedd are moved from S4C2 to the new BBC Democracy Live website.
  - 31 March –
    - Digital switchover is completed in Wales when the analogue transmissions at Wenvoe are switched off. Consequently, Channel 4 becomes available in all homes in Wales for the first time.
    - S4C begins broadcasting solely in Welsh.
  - 19 July – S4C begins broadcasting in high definition when it launches a channel called 'Clirlun'.
  - 16 September – S4C2 is removed from Sky channel 507.
  - 20 October – The Chancellor of the Exchequer, George Osborne, announces that part of the responsibility for funding S4C is to be transferred to the BBC.
  - October – S4C2 is removed from Virgin Media channel 168.
  - 30 November – S4C2 is removed from Freeview channel 86.
  - 6 December – S4C2 ceases broadcasting when it is removed from the Freesat platform.
- 2011
  - 14 January – The S4C Authority confirms it has closed S4C2 due to budget cuts imposed on it by the Department of Culture, Media and Sport.
- 2012
  - 1 December – S4C Clirlun closes and the following day Channel 4 HD taking over its transmission capacity.
- 2013
  - 14 January – As part of a rebranding of ITV Wales, a new logo is introduced and the Wales news magazine is renamed ITV News Cymru Wales in 2013.
  - 29 January – BBC One Wales begins broadcasting in high definition.
  - 1 April – Responsibility for the funding of S4C begins to transfer to the BBC.
  - September – ITV Wales announces the launch of a new weekly current affairs programme, Newsweek Wales.
- 2014
  - 1 January – ITV in Wales is now officially known as ITV Cymru Wales, and gains its own franchise instead of being part of the "Wales and West" franchise.
  - 30 June – ITV Cymru Wales moves into a new facility on the ground floor of 3 Assembly Square, located next to the Welsh Assembly in Cardiff Bay and to mark the change, the Wales at Six name is reintroduced after 20 years.
  - 15 October – Made in Cardiff begins broadcasting as Cardiff's local television channel.
- 2015
  - 25 August – ITV Cymru Wales begins broadcasting in HD.
- 2016
  - 7 June – S4C resumes high definition broadcasting.
  - 12 July – That's Swansea Bay begins broadcasting.
  - 7 September – It is agreed that the BBC will provide £74.5m a year funding to S4C from the licence fee until 2022.
- 2017
  - 19 April – Cardiff TV's flagship news bulletin Cardiff News is broadcast for the final time. The programme is replaced by a mixed bulletin of local and national news produced at Made TV's headquarters in Leeds.
  - 26 April – Local television comes to north east Wales when Made in North Wales begins broadcasting.
- 2018
  - February – Cardiff Live is launched as Made in Cardiff's sole local programme. The bulletin however is not live but it is produced locally. At around the same time, Made in Cardiff and Made in North Wales are relaunched as Cardiff TV and North Wales TV respectively.
  - 29 March – The UK Government announces that it will continue providing £6.72m of funding for S4C until 2020, with the aim of S4C being funded wholly from the licence fee from 2022. This will see S4C's funding being decided as part of the licence fee settlement, for 10 year periods.
  - 29 November – BBC Two Wales begins broadcasting in high definition.
- 2019
  - No events.

== 2020s ==
- 2020
  - BBC One Wales and BBC Two Wales begin broadcasting from new studios in Cardiff's Central Square.
  - 28 September – The final edition of BBC Cymru Wales's flagship news programme, Wales Today, is broadcast from its Llandaff studios shortly after 9am, and the first edition is aired from Central Square at lunchtime.

== See also ==
- Timeline of ITV in Wales
- Timeline of S4C
