= Television in Wales =

Television in Wales began in 1952. Initially, all programmes were in English with occasional Welsh language programmes. In 1982 Welsh language channel S4C was launched. The digital switchover happened in 2009-2010 and S4C became an exclusively Welsh language channel.

== History ==
=== Initial broadcasting ===
Television in the UK started in 1936 as a public service which was free of advertising, but did not arrive in Wales until the opening of the Wenvoe transmitter in August 1952. Initially, all programmes were in the English language, although under the leadership of Welsh director and controller Alun Oldfield-Davies, occasional Welsh language programmes were broadcast during closed periods, replacing the test card. In 1958, responsibility for programming in Wales fell to Television Wales and the West, although Welsh language broadcasting was mainly served by the Manchester-based Granada company, producing about an hour a week.

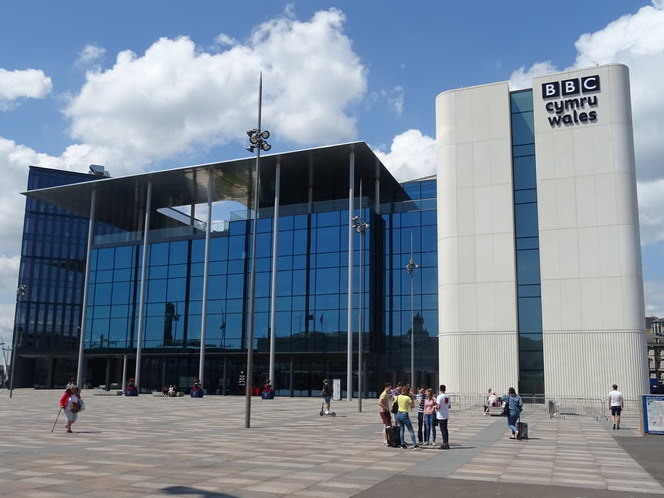
BBC Cymru Wales current headquarters in Cardiff

=== BBC Cymru Wales ===
The launch of BBC Cymru Wales (BBC Wales at the time) on 9 February 1964 provided a specific television service for the country. The new service was heavily promoted (proclaiming that Wales gets its very own TV service in 1964!) with animated promos using the sound of Welsh choirs to explain about interference from the mountains. Two years later in 1966, BBC Cymru Wales' new headquarters at Broadcasting House in Cardiff opened and the first colour broadcast for Wales followed in 1970.

Into the late 1990s, BBC Cymru Wales continued to expand their services. The first web pages for Wales began to appear on BBC Online in 1997, including a variety of features surrounding programming, schedules, community events and other stories. The following year, BBC Wales gained additional air time through the use of a late prime-time to midnight opt-out from new digital channel BBC Choice. This lasted until opt-outs ended on the channel in 2001; subsequently BBC Wales opted out of the BBC Two prime-time schedule on digital platforms to broadcast BBC 2W. This latter service closed on 2 January 2009 – prior to the digital switchover which would have ceased separate broadcasting on analogue and digital.

BBC Cymru Wales is currently based in Cardiff and directly employs some 1,200 people to produce a range of programmes for television, radio and online services in both English and Welsh.

BBC Cymru Wales operates two TV channels (BBC One Wales, BBC Two Wales) and two radio stations (BBC Radio Wales and BBC Radio Cymru). The total budget for BBC Cymru Wales (including S4C's £76 million) is £151 million, £31 million of which is for BBC-produced television productions.

=== S4C (Sianel Pedwar Cymru) ===
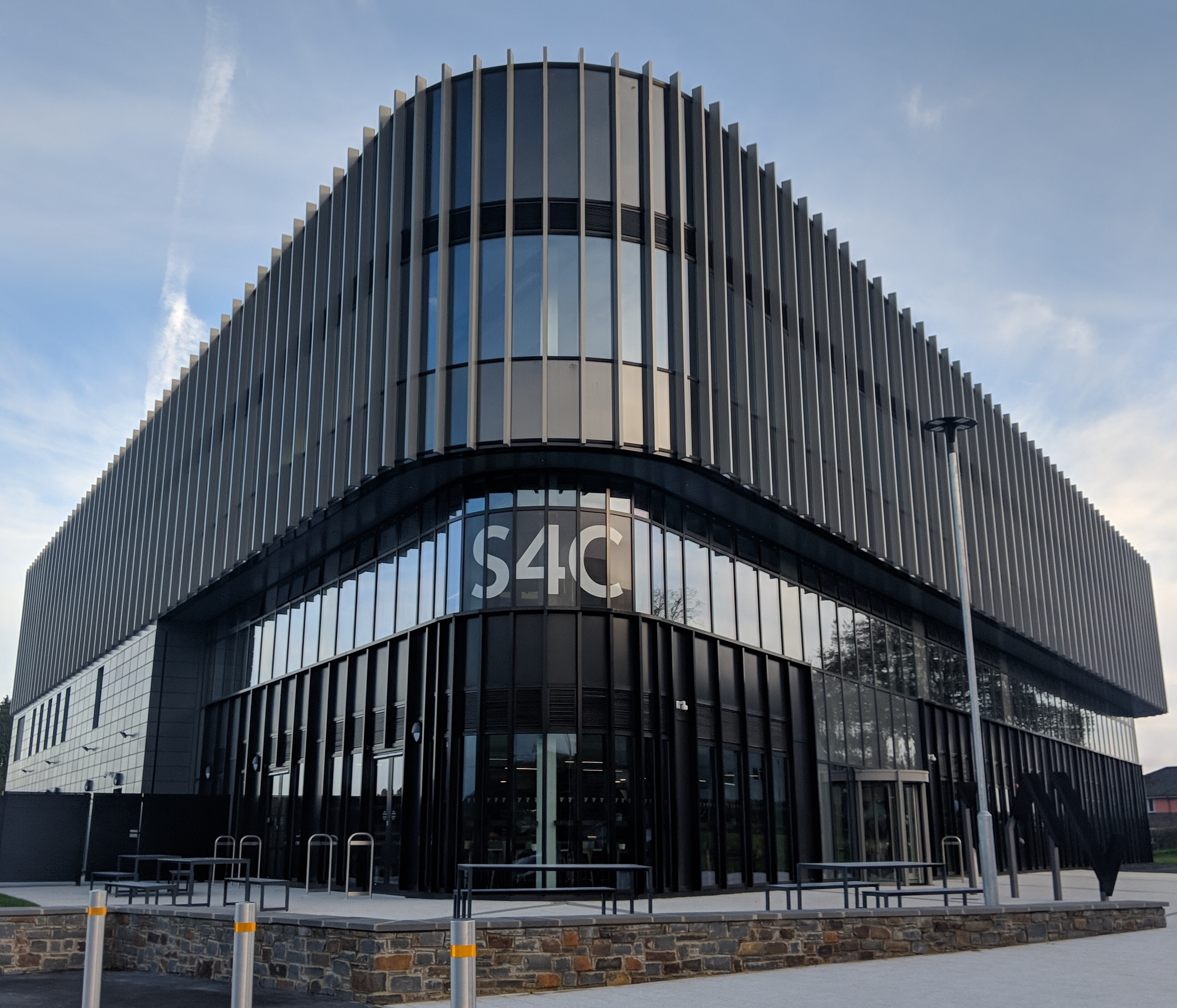
S4C current headquarters in Carmarthen

On 17 September 1980, the former president of Plaid Cymru, Gwynfor Evans, threatened to go on a hunger strike if the Conservative government of Margaret Thatcher did not honour its commitment to provide a Welsh language television service. On the 1st of November 1982, S4C (Sianel Pedwar Cymru) was launched bringing together the BBC, HTV and other independent producers to provide an initial service of 22 hours of Welsh-language television. The digital switchover in Wales of 2009-2010 meant that the previously bilingual Channel 4 split into S4C, broadcasting exclusively in Welsh and Channel 4 broadcasting exclusively in English.

=== ITV Cymru Wales ===
The broadcasting licence was created for ITV Cymru Wales following the split of ITV Wales & West. It is hoped that the separate licence will benefit local viewers.

In May 2012, Ofcom raised the possibility of a stand-alone licence for Wales.

On 25 August 2015, ITV Cymru Wales began broadcasting in HD (prior to this HD viewers in Wales received ITV Central HD), including the company's news service and non-news programming including current affairs and documentaries.

== Recent productions ==
The decision by Julie Gardner, Head of Drama for BBC Wales, to film and produce the 2005 revived version of Doctor Who in Wales is widely seen as a bellwether moment for the industry for the nation. This in turn was followed by the opening of the Roath Lock production studios in Cardiff. Recent English language programmes that have been filmed in Wales include Sherlock and His Dark Materials, while other series, such as Hinterland (Y Gwyll) and Keeping Faith (Un Bore Mercher) have been filmed in both Welsh and English.

== See also ==
- Timeline of television in Wales
- List of Welsh television series
- List of Welsh-language television channels
- List of Welsh-language programmes
- ITV Cymru Wales
- BBC Cymru Wales
- Television Wales and the West
- S4C Dau
- S4C Chwaraeon
- S4C Digital Networks
- S4C Authority

== Sources ==
- Davies, John; Jenkins, Nigel; Baines, Menna; Lynch, Peredur I., eds. (2008). The Welsh Academy Encyclopaedia of Wales. Cardiff: University of Wales Press. ISBN 978-0-7083-1953-6.
