= Timeline of Channel 4 =

This is a timeline of the history of Channel 4.

== 1970s ==
- 1977
  - 3 February – The Annan Committee on the future of broadcasting makes its recommendations. They include the establishment of a fourth, independent television channel, the establishment of Broadcasting Complaints Commission and an increase in independent production.
- 1979
  - With the approach of the 1979 general election both the Conservatives and Labour include plans for a fourth channel in their election manifestos. Labour favours an "Open Broadcasting Authority" community service aimed at minority groups, while the Conservatives plan is for the channel to be given to ITV. Both main parties also pledge to launch a separate Welsh language television service for Wales.

== 1980s ==
- 1980
  - 13 November – The Broadcasting Act 1980 paves the way for a fourth television channel in the UK.
  - The channel is established as a subsidiary of the Independent Broadcasting Authority (IBA). A subscription is levied on the ITV companies to pay for the channel; they sell Channel 4's airtime in return.
- 1981
  - 1 January – The Channel Four Television Company is established to provide the fourth channel service for England, Scotland and Northern Ireland – Wales' fourth channel will be a Welsh language service called S4C although it will broadcast some Channel 4 programmes during off-peak hours.

Logo used from 1982 to 1996

- 1982
  - 2 August – Test broadcasts commence. These mainly consist of showing the IBA's testcard ETP-1 between 9 am and 8 pm.
  - 2 November – Channel 4 launches across most of England, Scotland and Northern Ireland – Wales' fourth channel, S4C, had launched the previous evening. However, some areas are unable to receive the fourth channel at launch because the required engineering at many relay transmitters had not been carried out and it wasn't until later in the decade that all transmitters were carrying the fourth channel.
    - 4:40 pm: Continuity announcer Paul Coia launches the channel with the words "Good afternoon. It's a pleasure to be able to say to you: Welcome to Channel 4".
    - 4:45 pm: The first programme airs. It is the gameshow Countdown and presenter Richard Whiteley starts by saying "as the countdown to a brand new channel ends, a brand new countdown begins." It remains on the air to this day.
    - 7 pm: The first edition of Channel 4 News, the UK's first hour-long news programme.
    - 8 pm: The first edition of Channel 4's soap opera Brookside is broadcast and would run until 2003.
    - 10:15 pm: The Comic Strip Presents...Five Go Mad In Dorset, first of six comedies parodying the Famous Four and their dog doing some detective work while on holiday in the West Country, is broadcast. It captured the Broadcasting Press Guild prize for 'best comedy'.
  - 5 November – The first edition of music programme The Tube is broadcast.
  - 7 November – Coverage of American football is shown for the first time on Channel 4, beginning the channel's long association with the sport.
  - 8 November – Channel 4 shows live sport for the first time when it broadcasts coverage of a match from Division One of the National Basketball League. It shows highlights of the first half of the game and live coverage of the second half Coverage of both sports is part of Channel 4's remit to showcase so-called minority sports which do not get coverage on the BBC or ITV.
  - 14 November – The viewer complaints programme Right to Reply launches. It is the only programme that Channel 4 produces in-house.
  - December – MP John Carlisle calls for the Home Secretary to withdraw the station's licence following a planned televised party for homosexuals, One in Five.
  - 26 December – Premiere of The Snowman on Channel 4.
  - 27 December – Channel 4 airs its first theme night, Fifties to the Fore. The evening includes episodes of ABC and ATV shows such as Armchair Theatre and Oh Boy!.
- 1983
  - 30 January – Channel 4 becomes the first broadcaster in the UK to screen the Super Bowl live.
  - 18 March – Channel 4 broadcasts in-vision teletext pages for the first time. Two magazines are shown, 4-Tel on View and Oracle on View – and in fifteen-minute bursts which are repeated several times each day prior to the start of each day's transmissions. Teletext pages are only shown on weekdays.
  - 24 May – Channel 4 (and S4C in Wales) become the new home of Engineering Announcements. They had previously been broadcast on ITV.
- 1984
  - 22 March – Horse racing coverage is broadcast on Channel 4 for the first time, resulting in the launch Channel 4 Racing.
  - 15 October – Weekday afternoon broadcasting starts at 2:30 pm, instead of 5 pm. and weekend programming begins an hour earlier at 1 pm.
  - November – Two years after going on the air, Channel 4 is now available from all 51 ‘main’ transmitters.
  - 19 November – Channel 4 wins its first Emmy Awards for Heart of the Dragon and The Tragedy of Carmen.
- 1985
  - 2–4 January – Channel 4 airs A Woman of Substance and secures an audience of 13.8 million, its largest to date.
  - 5 October – The first weekend horse racing is shown on Channel 4 when ITV transfers coverage of horse racing to Channel 4 ahead of the end of World of Sport.
- 1986
  - The Peacock Report recommends that the channel should be given the option to sell its own airtime.
  - Viewers' campaigner Mary Whitehouse lobbies advertisers to boycott the channel over its content, with some success.
  - February – For the first time, animated graphics are seen during teletext transmissions. This is made possible by transmitting 4-Tel on View from a disc rather than live.
  - 19 September – Channel 4 begins to show a red triangle at the start of and during films with adult themes, with the first being French film Themroc. After lobbying from newspapers and pressure groups this method of identifying such material was phased out within a year.
  - 18 October – Channel 4 starts weekend morning broadcasting with weekend transmissions now beginning at around 9:30 am.
- 1987
  - 23 April – Channel 4 starts broadcasting into the early hours on Thursday, Friday and Saturday nights when it launches Nightime. One of the programmes is the discussion show After Dark which was broadcast live and with no scheduled end time.
  - 24 April – Music show The Tube is shown for the final time.
  - 3 May – The first of two series of groundbreaking youth television show Network 7 starts. The programme is shown live at Sunday lunchtime.
  - 14 September – ITV Schools programmes transfer to Channel 4 resulting in an expansion of the channel's weekday broadcasting hours. The programmes are broadcast in the same 9:30 am to midday slot.
  - 21 September
    - As part of the expansion of programme hours, a new weekday lunchtime schedule is introduced. The first edition of a weekday business and financial news programme Business Daily is broadcast and this is followed by a new children's slot called Just4Fun.
    - At 1 pm, a one-hour block of programmes from the newly formed Open College begins.
  - 30 October – The first edition of Channel 4's flagship current affairs documentary series Dispatches is broadcast.
  - December – The IBA completes its roll-out of Channel 4 and the fourth channel is now available from all of the UK transmitter network.
- 1988
  - 11 January – The first episode of the long-running quiz show Fifteen to One is broadcast.
  - 15 February – Channel 4 starts broadcasting into the early hours every night, closing down between 2 am and 3 am. Previously, Channel 4 had closed down between midnight and 1 am.
  - 17 September–2 October – Channel 4's only broadcast of the Olympic Games takes place when it broadcasts the overnight and breakfast coverage of the 1988 Olympic Games. ITV shows the daytime coverage.
- 1989
  - February – Channel 4 begins broadcasting in Nicam digital stereo, initially from the Crystal Palace transmitter, prior to a national transmitter-by-transmitter rollout during 1990.
  - 31 March – The last Oracle on View transmission takes place.
  - 3 April – Channel 4 launches its breakfast television service The Channel Four Daily. From this date, 4-Tel on View is shown in a single 40-minute block rather than in 15-minute bursts. It is also shown at the weekend for the first time.
  - 21 November – Television coverage of proceedings in the House of Commons begins and Channel 4 launches The Parliament Programme, which airs four day a week.

== 1990s ==
- 1990
  - The Broadcasting Act 1990 maintains Channel 4's status as a publicly owned entity, but allows it to sell its own airtime from 1993. It also sets out the remit of its funding formula with ITV from 1993, with ITV agreeing to fund Channel 4 if it falls below 14% of total TV advertising revenue.
  - 19 February – The first edition of Channel 4's documentary series Cutting Edge is broadcast.
  - 31 July – The final edition of Engineering Announcements is shown at 5:45 am.
- 1991
  - 17 January – Midnight Special is launched to provide extended coverage and analysis of the Gulf War. It ends when the War concludes but the format is resurrected for future major events, including for the duration of the 1992 General Election campaign.
  - 8 April – Channel 4's three-week Banned season features a series of films and programmes which had previously been banned from British television or cinema. The season includes network television showings of Scum, Monty Python's Life of Brian and Sebastiane. There is also a second broadcast of the controversial 1988 Thames Television documentary Death on the Rock which investigated the shooting of three members of the IRA by the SAS in Gibraltar. The season proves to be controversial and Channel 4 is investigated by the Obscene Publications Squad and referred to the Director of Public Prosecutions.
- 1992
  - 25 June – The final edition of Business Daily is broadcast although the early morning business news bulletins continue to be aired for another three months, until the end of The Channel Four Daily.
  - 6 September – The first edition of Football Italia is broadcast as part of Channel 4's deal to show Serie A, with live coverage of Sampdoria v Lazio. The channel continues to show Italian football for the next ten years.
  - 25 September – The final edition of The Channel Four Daily is broadcast.
  - 28 September – The first edition of The Big Breakfast is broadcast.
  - 2 November – The FourScore theme used in the idents is replaced.
  - 31 December – Channel 4's testcard ETP-1 is shown for the final time.
- 1993
  - 1 January – Channel 4 becomes an independent statutory corporation.
  - Instead of fully closing down, 4-Tel on View is shown throughout the channel's overnight downtime.
  - The channel makes a payment of £38 million to ITV under terms of its funding formula.
  - 28 June – The final ITV Schools programmes are broadcast.
  - 20 September – Schools programmes continue to be shown on Channel 4 under the branding of Channel 4 Schools.
  - 25 December – Channel 4 airs its first "Alternative Christmas message". The broadcast features a contemporary, often controversial celebrity, delivering a message in the manner of The Queen. The first alternative message is delivered by Quentin Crisp.
- 1994
  - 16 January – The first edition of archeology series Time Team is broadcast.
  - 6 July – The channel moves into its new headquarters at 124 Horseferry Road, London.
- 1995
  - 23 October – The first episode of the soap opera Hollyoaks is broadcast.

Logo used from 1996 to 1999

- 1996
  - The Broadcasting Act 1996 maintains Channel 4's public status.
  - Channel 4 signs a home video deal with Video Collection International to handle retail sales of the FilmFour catalogue on VHS, while FilmFour themselves would handle rentals.
  - 11 October – After nearly 14 years, Channel 4 unveils a new presentation package. Gone were the original multi-coloured blocks, instead the familiar logo would be placed in one of four circles against different backgrounds. This look would last for just three years.
- 1997
  - Chris Smith, the Secretary of State for Culture, Media and Sport, announces that Channel 4's funding formula with ITV will be abolished from 1998.
  - 6 January – Channel 4 starts 24-hour broadcasting, resulting in the end of 4-Tel on View.
  - 29 October & 15 November – Channel 4 shows the first and second legs of the 1998 FIFA World Cup Playoff between Italy and Russia.
- 1998
  - Channel 4 extends its distribution deal with Video Collection International, with both companies agreeing to a three-year sales, marketing and distribution agreement for Channel 4 Video.
  - 28 February – The 1998 Africa Cup of Nations Final between South Africa and Egypt is shown live. This is the first time that the tournament has been shown in the UK.
  - 25 October – The T4 strand is broadcast for the first time.

Logo used from 1999 to 2004

  - 1 November – FilmFour launches as a subscription channel.
- 1999
  - 2 April – Channel 4 launches a new presentation package. Gone were the circles, instead the logo was placed inside a square with coloured lines scrolling across the screen against different backgrounds. This look would last for five years.
  - 1 July – Channel 4 starts broadcasting cricket following the channel sensationally obtaining the rights from the BBC the previous year.

== 2000s ==
- 2000
  - 18 July – The reality show Big Brother is first broadcast.
- 2001
  - 18 January – E4 launches as a pay channel.
  - 7 April – FilmFour launches sister channels FilmFour World and FilmFour Extreme. The two stations are available to FilmFour subscribers at no additional cost and share a single broadcast frequency: World (4–10 pm) broadcasts international cinema and Extreme (10 pm – 4 am) carries controversial and cutting-edge movies. A +1 hour timeshift channel of the main FilmFour is launched at the same time. The new channels are carried on satellite and cable; ONdigital/ITV Digital subscribers continued to receive only the core FilmFour.
  - 20 April – Channel 4 scraps Right to Reply. It had been on air since its launch in 1982 and was the only programme that they produced in-house.
  - 24 September – Countdown introduces its new 15-round format and 45-minute runtime which is still in use to this day.
  - 26 November – The first edition of Richard & Judy is broadcast, a new live teatime chat show hosted by Richard Madeley and Judy Finnigan, following the couple's move from ITV earlier in the year.
- 2002
  - 1 January – An updated set of idents are launched.
  - 19 January – Channel 4 begins airing highlights from the World Rally Championship, after securing the rights from the BBC.
  - 29 March – The final edition of The Big Breakfast is broadcast.
  - 29 April – The first edition of Channel 4's third breakfast television programme RI:SE is broadcast.
  - 1 May – ITV Digital stops broadcasting which means that E4 and FilmFour are temporarily no longer available on digital terrestrial television.
- 2003
  - 21 April – Channel 4 airs the 1000th episode of Hollyoaks.
  - 1 May – At The Races launches.
  - 5 May – FilmFour spin-off channels FilmFour Extreme and FilmFour World stop broadcasting. They are replaced by FilmFour Weekly.
  - 4 November – After 2,915 episodes and 21 years on the air, the final episode of Brookside is broadcast.
  - 9 November – Channel 4's coverage of the World Rally Championship ends after two years with live coverage of the final stage from Wales Rally GB, the rights are transferred over to ITV from 2004.
  - 16 December – Channel 4's Teletext service was renamed from FourText to Teletext on 4
  - 19 December
    - The final edition of the short-lived breakfast programme RI:SE is broadcast.
    - The original run of Fifteen to One ends after 2,265 episodes and 15 years on the air. It would be revived a decade later.

Logo used from 2004 to 2015

- 2004
  - 27 February – Reports emerge of discussions between Channel 4 and Five aimed at a merger between the two channels.
  - 29 March – At the Races closes down due to financial problems. It relaunched on 11 June without any involvement from Channel 4.
  - 5 November – Channel 4 begins airing the long-running American animated comedy series The Simpsons after gaining the terrestrial broadcast rights to the show from the BBC.
  - 17 November – It is reported that merger talks between Channel 4 and Five have been called off after complexities arose between the public broadcaster Channel 4 and its commercial counterpart.
  - 31 December – Channel 4's idents and presentation are revamped with the logo forming from different items in various settings, five years after the last major change.
- 2005
  - 27 May – E4 becomes a free-to-air channel and joins the Freeview platform although it had been available on digital terrestrial TV for the past year as part of the pay service Top Up TV.
  - June – Following Video Collection International's merger with BBC Video to form 2 Entertain, Channel 4 revokes its distribution deal with the company and instead decides to take over distribution in-house by forming 4DVD, with releases under the Channel 4 DVD and FilmFour brands.
  - 26 June – Countdown's original presenter Richard Whiteley dies aged 61, Channel 4 postpones the broadcast of the programme the day after his death as a mark of respect with his final episode shown on 1 July and is then placed on hiatus until the end of October.
  - August – E4 begins regular daytime broadcasting and fills the daytime hours with a new music stand E4 Music.
  - September – Cricket is shown on Channel 4 for the final time until 2019.
  - 10 October – More4 launches.
  - 31 October – The first episode of Deal or No Deal is broadcast.
- 2006
  - 27 March – The Paul O'Grady Show moves to Channel 4, following a contract dispute with ITV and begins sharing the channel's 5 pm teatime slot with Richard & Judy on a three-month rotation.
  - 3 July – Channel 4 announces that FilmFour would relaunch as a free-to-air network on 23 July, and be renamed Film4 as it launches on Freeview.
  - 19 July – The subscription version of FilmFour closes down for the final time to prepare for the relaunch. Sister channel FilmFour Weekly closes down permanently to make way for the relaunch as well.
  - 23 July – The relaunched Film4 launches at 9 pm, with the UK free-to-air premiere of Lost in Translation as its first film. Its broadcasting hours change to 12:45 pm – 8:45 am and commercial breaks are shown during films for the first time.
  - 16 November – Channel 4 launches its on demand service 4oD.
  - 10 December – Channel 4 launches an HD service.
  - December – 4 Digital Group is awarded the licence to operate the second national DAB multiplex.
- 2007
  - 13 July – Channel 4 announces to purchase of a 50% stake in Emap plc's Box Television and its seven owned channels and take over television operations.
  - 23 July – The Box Television stake sale is completed, with Emap and Channel 4 each holding 50%.
  - November – Channel 4 celebrates its 25th anniversary with a number of special programmes.
  - 2 November – Channel 4 marks the exact date of its 25th anniversary by bringing back its original idents from 1982 for a single day. There is also a repeat of the first-ever episode of Countdown, along with a special 25th birthday episode airing immediately afterwards and later that evening, Jimmy Carr hosts The Big Fat Anniversary Quiz.
  - 10 December – Channel 4 launches a high-definition television simulcast of Channel 4 on Sky's digital satellite platform, after they agreed to contribute toward the channel's satellite distribution costs.
- 2008
  - 20 February – Box Television announces that The Hits would be replaced with a Channel 4-branded music channel called 4Music. The transition would begin with a block that would air on Sundays from March, and the full relaunch would occur before the end of the year.
  - 24 June – Box Television officially announces that 4Music would launch in August to coincide with the 2008 V Festival.
  - 15 August – The Hits is officially replaced with 4Music.
  - 22 August – The final edition of Richard & Judy is broadcast, ahead of its move to UKTV in October.
  - October – Channel Four Television Corporation announced that it was abandoning its digital radio plans. Subsequently, the licence was returned to Ofcom.
  - 30 October – Channel 4's teletext service Teletext on 4 closes.
- 2009
  - 23 May – Film4's broadcasting hours are changed to 11 am – 4 am. Previously, the channel had been on air for 20 hours a day.
  - 4 June – E4 Music airs for the final time. Its hours had been cut back in recent times as the amount of scripted comedy and drama screened in daytime increased.
  - 14 December – E4 HD launches.
  - 18 December – The final edition of The Paul O'Grady Show is broadcast, before he leaves the network to pursue new projects.

== 2010s ==
- 2010
  - 31 March – For the first time, Channel 4 is available to all viewers in Wales when the country completes its digital switchover. Consequently, S4C stops broadcasting programming in English, thereby becoming a full-time Welsh language service.
  - 20 July – Film4 HD launches, but only on Virgin Media. It does not appear on Sky Digital until September 2013.
  - 10 September – The final edition of Big Brother is broadcast on Channel 4 after a decade on the air, the programme is snapped up by Channel 5 the following year.
  - 1 November – Film4oD launches.
- 2011
  - 26 August – Channel 4's repeats of the American sitcom Friends are shown for the final time, bringing the show's 16-year run on the channel to an end with E4 ceasing their repeats the following Sunday. The broadcast rights to the series subsequently moved to Comedy Central.
- 2012
  - 23 January – More4 adopts a new logo and on-air branding. It is repositioned to show more lifestyle content and a move away from documentaries and arts. To coincide with the change, a new logo and on-air branding is introduced.
  - 27 January – Channel 4 announces the launch of a new catch-up channel under the codename of "Project Shuffle", with a launch aiming for June.
  - 8 March – Project Shuffle is officially named as 4Seven.
  - 16 April – More4 +2 launches on Sky Digital, broadcasting between 7:45 pm and 11 pm. This temporary channel was launched on Sky to secure a spot for 4Seven on the EPG.
  - 18 April – The ETP-1 test card makes one final appearance on Channel 4 to announce the loss of analogue television services in the London region. The card is shown from the Crystal Palace transmitter only and is the last thing broadcast by analogue Channel 4 before the signal it is switched off.
  - 22 May – Channel 4 announces that 4Seven will officially launch on 4 July.
  - 23 May – Box Television announces that Q would be replaced on 4 July with a channel branded after the Heat magazine.
  - 26 June – More4 +2 closes to make way for 4Seven.
  - 4 July – 4seven and Heat launch.
  - 29 August–9 September – Channel 4 broadcasts live coverage of the 2012 Summer Paralympics. The event had previously been broadcast by the BBC.
  - 29 December – After more than 14 years, the T4 programming strand is shown for the final time.
- 2013
  - 4 February – More4 HD launches.
  - 2 April – All Box Television networks go free-to-air on satellite, while 4Music becomes Free-to-View.
- 2014
  - 7–16 March – Channel 4 broadcasts live coverage of the 2014 Winter Paralympics. This is the first time that the Winter Paralympic Games has ever been seen on British television.
  - 5 April – After a successful one-off broadcast the previous year, Fifteen to One returns on a permanent basis, albeit with a few changes to the format. It is presented by Sandi Toksvig.
  - 1 July – 4seven HD launches.
  - 7 September – After more than 20 years on the air and 280 episodes, the final edition of Time Team is broadcast.
- 2015
  - 5 February – Box Television is renamed The Box Plus Network.
  - 30 March – Channel 4's on-demand service is renamed All 4.
  - 29 September – Channel 4 launches a new set of idents and presentation package, 11 years since the last change which sees the Channel 4 blocks being discovered in various places.
- 2016
  - 18 March – Channel 4 shows Formula One motor racing for the first time. This comes about following the BBC's decision to end its deal with Formula One three years early.
  - 19 May – The Box Plus Network announce a refresh to the "Box" brand, with the addition of the rebranding of Heat and Smash Hits! as "Box Upfront" and "Box Hits" respectively, alongside the addition of a digital network, "BeBox".
  - 25 May – The rebranding of Heat and Smash Hits into Box Upfront and Box Hits occurs.
  - 7–18 September – Channel 4 broadcasts live coverage of the 2016 Summer Paralympics.
  - 23 December – After 3,003 episodes and 11 years on the air, the final episode of Deal or No Deal is broadcast.
  - 27 December – Channel 4 Racing comes to an end after more than 32 years. From 1 January 2017, coverage of the sport transfers back to ITV.
- 2017
  - 7 January – Channel 4 broadcasts darts for the first time when it shows live coverage of the 2017 BDO World Darts Championship. Channel 4 also shows the 2018 event.
  - 16 July — Channel 4 and More4 screen live coverage of UEFA Women's Euro 2017, including all of England's matches and the final.
  - 29 August – Channel 4 airs its first episode of The Great British Bake Off, after controversially poaching it from the BBC.
  - 31 October – Channel 4 launches a new set of idents after rebranding its presentation in June of the same year featuring a giant figure made of the Channel 4 blocks in a variety of situations set to an acoustic guitar version of the FourScore theme.
- 2018
  - 16 April – 4Music is reconfigured into an entertainment-led channel.
  - 2 June – Channel 4 shows live rugby union for the first time when it broadcasts live coverage of Wales' Summer tour. Later in the year Channel 4 begins showing one match from each round from the Heineken Cup.
  - 27 September – E4, More4, Film4, 4Music and 4seven are all rebranded with new logos based around the corporate Channel 4 logo. The idents on these channels are all either updated or revamped.
  - 31 October – Channel 4 announces that its headquarters will be relocated to the city of Leeds.
- 2019
  - 8 January – Channel 4 takes full control of The Box Plus Network from Bauer Media.
  - 16 March – Channel 4 begins its new Formula One contract, in which it broadcasts extended highlights of qualifying and races from every round in the championship, along with full live coverage of the British Grand Prix at Silverstone in July, its joint broadcasting partner Sky Sports continues to show every race from the championship live. Previously, it had been able to broadcast up to half of the races live in each season.
  - 28 June – Fifteen to One ends for a second time after five years on air.
  - 14 July – Channel 4 shows live coverage of the 2019 Cricket World Cup Final. This is the first time since 2005 that live cricket has been shown on terrestrial television. Channel 4 had the rights to show highlights of the tournament. Sky Sports had the live rights to the tournament but had agreed to make the final available on free-to-air television if England made the final.
  - 29 July – Channel 4 integrates The Box Plus Network into its own operations.

== 2020s ==
- 2020
  - 9 January – Box Upfront stops broadcasting.
  - 25 March – Channel 4 puts the "Stay at Home" digital on-screen graphic on the 4, E4, More4 and 4seven TV channels to tell viewers to stay at home during the coronavirus pandemic. This continued until 13 May when it is replaced with "Stay Safe", reminding viewers to safe following the easing of some lockdown restrictions.
  - 30 March – Channel 4 shows a live weekday daytime magazine show for the first time when it broadcasts the first edition of The Steph Show. It returns in September on a permanent basis and is renamed as Steph's Packed Lunch.
- 2021
  - 5 February – Test cricket returns to Channel 4 and free-to-air television, after an absence of more than 15 years when it begins showing England's test series against India.
  - 9 April – Channel 4 receives criticism for not cancelling most of its scheduled programmes following the death of Prince Philip. Some shows are cancelled in favour of news coverage and special programming paying tribute to the Prince but apart from that, it announces its intention to still show Hollyoaks, Gogglebox and the final of The Circle.
  - 24 August–5 September – The 2021 Summer Paralympics are shown live on Channel 4 and sister channel More4.
  - 6 September – Channel 4 opens its new Leeds headquarters.
  - 11 September – Channel 4 does a last-minute deal with rights-holder Amazon Prime to show live coverage of the final of the 2021 US Open – Women's Singles after Britain's Emma Raducanu reaches the final. This is the first time since the late 1980s that tennis has been shown on Channel 4.
  - 25 September – Channel 4 and its sister channels are taken off air for several hours during primetime. This is blamed on the activation of fire suppression systems at playout provider Red Bee Media's White City building, which destroys hard drives in critical systems. Other major broadcasters, such as the BBC and Channel 5 who use services at this location, are also affected, but to a lesser extent. This leaves Channel 4 with no accessibility services, no live continuity announcements, and intermittent glitches whilst the broadcaster operates in a 'disaster recovery' mode. Channel 4's music channels also simulcast each other at points during this period. Following over 500 complaints to Ofcom due to accessibility features not being restored, Channel 4 releases a statement on 19 October saying that it is building a new system, but disruption could continue for a further month.

Logo used since 2015

- 2022
  - 12 February – Live Super League matches are broadcast on free-to-air television for the first time when Channel 4 shows the first of ten matches each season for the next two years. This is the first time in its 40-year history that they have broadcast rugby league. However, the coverage will only last for these two seasons as, from 2024, the BBC took over as free-to-air broadcaster of 12 live matches per season.
  - 4 June – Channel 4 shows live coverage of the England football team for the first time as part of a two-year deal which will see Channel 4 broadcast England’s matches in the UEFA Nations League, European Qualifiers to UEFA Euro 2024 and International Friendlies.
  - 20 June – After an investigation into the loss of subtitling and access services the previous September, Ofcom found that Channel 4 had breached its broadcast licence conditions on two grounds: missing its subtitles quota on Freesat for 2021, and failure to effectively communicate with affected audiences.
  - 29 June
    - E4 Extra launches.
    - 4Music replaces Box Hits on Freesat and Sky and reverts back to being a full-time music channel.
  - 27 September – Channel 4 HD moves to channel 104 on Sky, Freesat and Virgin Media in many parts of England, Scotland and Northern Ireland. The HD version of Channel 4 has previously only been available on channel 104 in London, with viewers in the rest of the UK required to scroll down the channel list to find it.
- 2023
  - 14 June – Channel 4 launches a new set of idents, after 6 years of the previous set.
  - 8 July – Channel 4 shows live coverage of the 2023 UEFA European Under-21 Championship final between England and Spain.
- 2024
  - 29 January – Channel Four Television Corporation announces, as part of a range of cuts, that all channels in The Box Plus Network will be closed by the end of the year as it feels that "small linear channels ...no longer deliver[ed] revenues or public value at scale". Channel 4 also says that "other [channels will close] at the right time".
  - 30 June – The Box Plus Network's five channels close.
- 2025
  - 9 April - Channel 4 sells its YouTube animation channel Mashed to Spud Gun Studios, an animation studio formed by Mashed's creators.
  - 24 September – Channel 4 launches its first Free ad-supported streaming television channels - 4Reality, 4Homes and 4Life. They are available on the Freely platform.

== See also ==
- Fourth UK television service
- Channel 4
- S4C
- Timeline of S4C
- Timeline of sport on Channel 4
