= Fourth UK television service =

Service proposed in the 1960s and 1970s

In the 1960s and 1970s, a fourth UK television service was envisioned, and popularly referred to as ITV2, before the launch of Channel 4 (and its Welsh counterpart, S4C) in November 1982.

== History ==
=== Development ===
During the drafting of the Television Act 1954, proposals were considered to allow “independent television” to comprise two or more channels within a single region, and to establish mechanisms through which the companies could compete with one another. When the first broadcasts went on the air in September 1955, there was not enough frequency space allocated for multiple independent television channels, leading to the approach whereby each company was allotted a part of the country (or in the larger areas a period of the seven-day week, weekdays or weekend).

The Independent Television Authority, the agency created to supervise independent television, along with the regional companies continually pushed the government for capacity to license a second set of franchises. The BBC resisted the lobbying for a second commercial channel, and longer broadcast hours. BBC would need to raise the licence fee for additional broadcast hours, while a second commercial channel would automatically receive more advertising revenue.

=== Proposals ===
When transmissions began on 625-line ultra high frequency in the early 1960s, the General Post Office was afforded the task of allocating each transmitter region with a set of frequencies that would provide maximum coverage and minimal interference. This had the potential to provide capacity for four television channels, allowing one for existing BBC (which later became BBC1), one for ITV services already carried on 405-line very high frequency, one for the new BBC2 (from 20 April 1964) and a fourth for future allocations. By 1968, the ITA considered this sufficiently likely that the new franchises were awarded for the next ten-year period they included a clause that allowed the licence to be revoked and reconsidered if a fourth UHF network became a reality.

Subsequently, the potential fourth channel was often referred to as "ITV2". In anticipation of the second commercial network, it was common for television sets with push-button controls manufactured during the 1960s and 1970s to have buttons labelled "BBC1", "BBC2", "ITV1" and "ITV2".

The issue was a sensitive political point: the Labour Party of the 1950s and 1960s had traditionally been against commercial television, and many on the left of the party wanted to see all commercial television abolished, advocating instead for an expansion of the BBC – though this was not acted upon, most likely due to cost. The following Conservative government, along with advocates of commercial broadcasting, were similarly slow to act in implementing a new network following Edward Heath's victory in the general election on 18 June 1970. They instead concentrated on Independent Local Radio when the Sound Broadcasting Act 1972 received royal assent on 12 July 1972, and the Independent Television Authority accordingly changed its name to the Independent Broadcasting Authority on the same day.

On 3 February 1977, the Annan Committee on the Future of Broadcasting made its recommendations, including: the establishment of a fourth independent television channel, albeit controlled by a new Open Broadcasting Authority; the establishment of the Broadcasting Complaints Commission; and an increase in independent production. ITV companies continued to hope for ITV2. With the approach of the 1979 general election on 3 May, both the Conservative Party and Labour Party included plans for a fourth channel in their election manifestos. Labour favoured an Open Broadcasting Authority community service aimed at minority groups, while the Conservatives' plan was for the channel to be given to ITV. Both parties also pledged to launch a separate Welsh language television service for Wales, but when the Conservatives were elected, the new Home Secretary William Whitelaw decided against the idea and suggested, except for an occasional opt-out, that the service should be the same as offered in the rest of the United Kingdom. This led to acts of civil disobedience, including refusals to pay the television licence fee, sit-ins at both the BBC and HTV studios, and attacks on various transmitters for the Welsh-speaking areas.

On 17 September 1980, following opposition from the public and politicians – including a threat from the former president of Plaid Cymru, Gwynfor Evans to go on hunger strike – the government reversed its position on a separate Welsh language service for Wales. The idea was given the green light, which led to the establishment of the Welsh Fourth Channel Authority. Later, on 13 November of that year, the Broadcasting Act 1980 paved the way to create the new fourth television service as a subsidiary of the IBA, with a subscription to be levied on the ITV regional companies to pay for the channel, ITV companies able to sell commercial advert airtime in return.

=== Result ===
On 1 January 1981, the Channel Four Television Company was established to provide service for England, Scotland and Northern Ireland, led by Edmund Dell as chairman and Jeremy Isaacs as chief executive, and the Welsh language channel S4C was established to provide service for Wales (although it broadcast some English programmes during off-peak hours). On 2 August 1982, the trade test transmissions commenced, mainly consisting of the IBA's ETP-1 broadcasts, between 9.00am and 8.00pm every day. (Note: The ETP-1 testcard was broadcast for the final time on 31 December 1992, after which Channel 4 either showed a holding slide or 4-Tel on View during closedown periods as the network gradually increased its overnight programmes, until reaching 24 hour broadcasting.)

The two services began in November 1982. It was funded by ITV and then had a substantial amount of content produced by the regional companies until 31 December 1992. The ITV companies initially operating on Channel 4 were:

Service name	Advertising managed by ITV companies	Launch date and time
S4C	HTV Wales(includes several Welsh advertisements)	Monday 1 November 1982 (at 6.00pm)
Channel 4	Thames • LWT; Anglia; TVS; Channel TV (includes local advertisements); TSW; HTV West; Central; Granada; Yorkshire; Tyne Tees; Border; STV; Grampian; Ulster (with Irish-related content)	Tuesday 2 November 1982 (at 4.45pm)

On 1 January 1993, Channel 4 became an independent statutory corporation, and under the terms of the Broadcasting Act 1990 was also allowed to sell its own airtime. Under the act, ITV agreed to fund Channel 4 if total advertising revenue fell below 14%. The network also made a payment of £38 million to ITV, under the terms of its funding formula.

It was not until 7 December 1998 – 16 years after the launch of Channel 4 and S4C – that the name ITV2 was used for a new digital network in England and Wales to operate a single service with no regional content. On 11 August 2001, the ITV channel was renamed ITV1, (Note: The expansion of ITV's services, due to the growing number of various digital networks, include ITV2, ITV Sport Channel, and ITV Select. They both launched on 11 August 2001, and were placed into administration on 27 March 2002 as revenue was well below initial forecasts.) (Note: ITV1 reverted to the name "ITV" between 14 January 2013 and 14 November 2022.) a name that had been used on labelled push-buttons on many British television sets during the 1960s and 1970s.

== See also ==
- Toddlers' Truce
- Pilkington Committee on Broadcasting
- Colour Strike
- History of ITV
- Timeline of ITV
- Timeline of Channel 4
- Timeline of S4C
