= Vaughan Roderick =

Welsh radio and television presenter

- Born: 5 June 1957 (age 68)
- Occupations: Journalist; Newsreader
- Employer: BBC Cymru Wales
- Known for: Welsh Affairs editor at BBC Wales
- Parent: Selwyn Roderick

Vaughan Roderick (born 5 June 1957) is a Welsh radio and television journalist and news presenter.

== Television ==
Roderick is BBC Cymru Wales' editor for Welsh affairs on Wales Today and S4C's Newyddion respectively, having previously anchored the latter during the 1980s and 1990s.

Roderick has presented the programme CF99 and regularly contributes to Sunday Politics Wales and the Welsh Election coverages.

== Radio ==
Roderick presents Sunday Supplement for BBC Radio Wales and Dros Ginio for BBC Radio Cymru.
