= List of Welsh-language television channels =

This is a list of television channels that broadcast in Welsh language.

== Current channels ==
- S4C: general entertainment channel, news, documentaries, children's programmes, dramas, sport and films broadcasting in Wales.
- Cyw: Children's channel on satellite with programmes in Welsh, with a range of home-produced and foreign dubbed programmes.
- Bay TV Swansea: private television station in the Swansea Bay area. Mainly broadcasts in English, but has Welsh-language programming.

== Previous channels ==
- S4C 2: Welsh parliament channel, broadcasting in both Welsh and English between September 1999 and December 2010.
- S4C Clirlun was a high-definition service simulcasting S4C's main channel between 2010 and 2012.

== See also ==
- List of Welsh-language programmes
- Television in Wales
- List of television channels in Celtic languages
