= Ffeil =

- Ffeil title card (2020–2023)
- Genre: News for children
- Country of origin: United Kingdom
- Original language: Welsh

Production
- Production locations: New Broadcasting House, Cardiff, Wales
- Running time: 3.5 minutes
- Production company: BBC Cymru Wales

Original release
- Network: S4C
- Release: September 1995 – July 2023

Related
- Newyddion Ni; Ne-wff-ion

Ffeil (Welsh for 'File') is a Welsh language television news programme for children and young people, produced by BBC Cymru Wales, and broadcast on S4C from 1995 to 2023.

== Overview ==
Originally broadcast three times a week for 15 minutes (except during school summer holidays), Ffeil was later broadcast live for four and a half minutes every weekday afternoon throughout the year at 4:50pm, from the BBC's Broadcasting House in Llandaff, Cardiff. The programme was transmitted from Studio C2, the second largest studio in Broadcasting House. Following a relaunch in Spring 2012, Ffeil broadcast as part of S4C's Stwnsh strand on Mondays to Fridays from a smaller presentation studio at 5:00pm during term-time. It moved to New Broadcasting House, Cardiff in September 2020 into a VR green-screen studio and broadcasts on Mondays to Fridays at 5:55pm.

The programme has often been compared to its English-language counterpart, CBBC's Newsround. Ffeil differs in that it is produced directly by the BBC Cymru Wales news and current affairs department, whereas Newsround is produced by CBBC with facilities provided by BBC News. The programme also has an expanded brief to cover Welsh regional news and features, alongside national and international news. The reporters and presenters on Ffeil also regularly contribute to news coverage on BBC Radio Cymru and the nightly Newyddion (Welsh for 'News') programme on S4C.

== Presenters and reporters ==
- Mared Ifan
- Ifan Gwyn Davies
- Aimee Thomas

== Past presenters ==
- Alex Humphreys (Presenter/reporter)
- Mari Grug (Presenter/reporter)
- Guto Owen (Presenter/reporter)
- Teleri Glyn Jones (Presenter/reporter)
- Hanna Hopwood (Presenter/reporter)
- Huw Foulkes (Presenter/reporter)
- Owain Wyn Evans (Presenter/reporter)
- Catrin Heledd (Presenter/reporter)
- Jason Phelps (Presenter/reporter)
- Iwan Griffiths (Presenter/reporter)
- Steffan Messenger (Presenter/reporter)
- Karen Peacock (North Wales Correspondent)
- Mererid Wigley (Presenter/reporter)
- Rhydian Mason (Presenter/reporter)
- Ben Thomas (Presenter/reporter)
- Nest Roberts (North Wales Correspondent)
- Gruff Rowlands (Presenter/reporter)
- Rachel Evans (Presenter/reporter)
