= CF99 =

Former Welsh-language politics programme

- Genre: Public affairs
- Presented by: Bethan Rhys Roberts; Vaughan Roderick
- Country of origin: United Kingdom
- Original language: Welsh

Production
- Running time: 25 minutes
- Production company: BBC Cymru Wales

Original release
- Network: S4C
- Release: 3 October 2007 – 10 July 2013

Related
- O’r Senedd

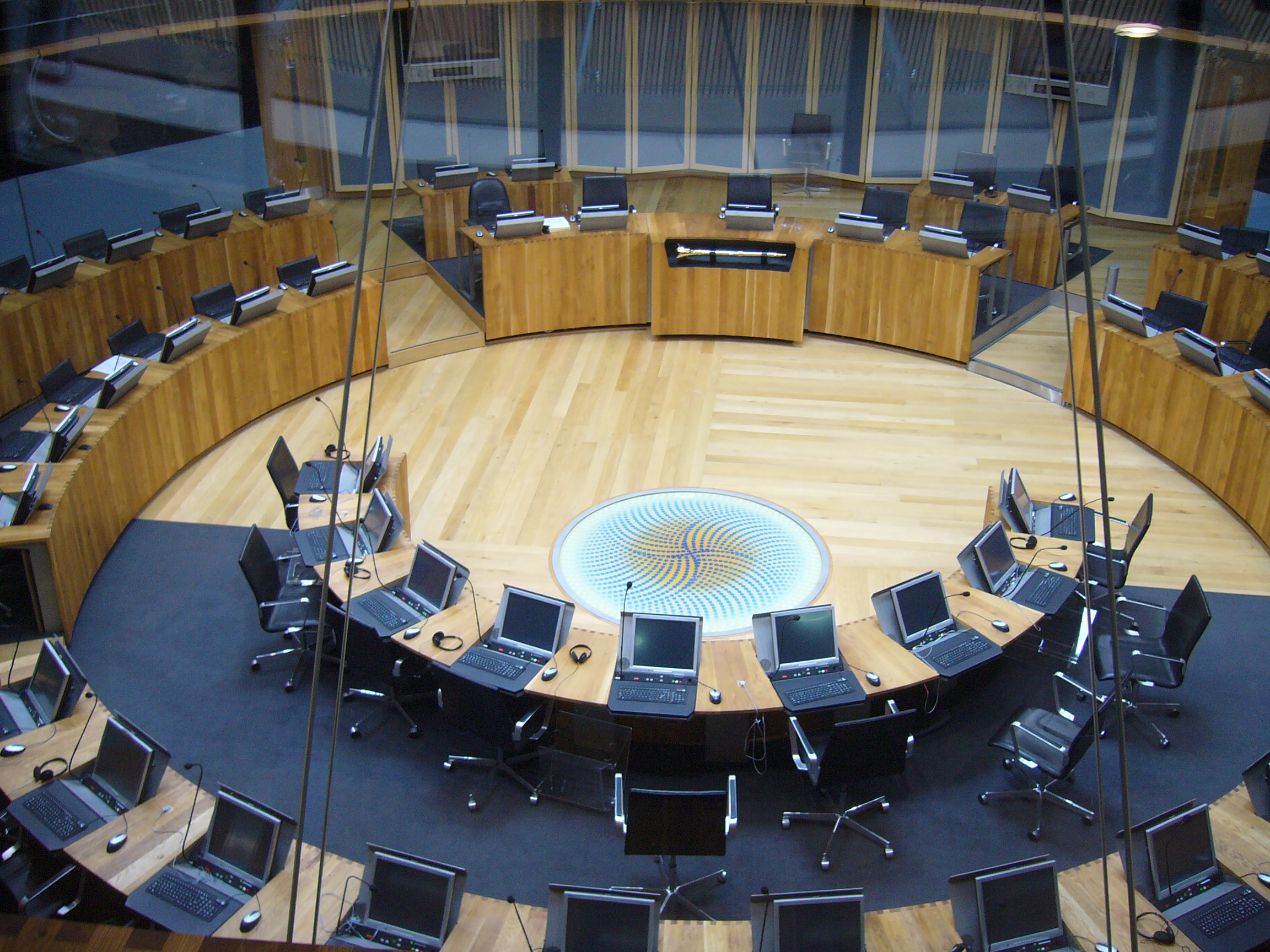
The main debating chamber of the Senedd

CF99 is a Welsh-language politics programme broadcast on S4C from 3 October 2007 until 10 July 2013. It was named after the unique post code of the National Assembly for Wales, from where the programme was broadcast live. The programme was presented by Bethan Rhys Roberts and Vaughan Roderick.

A replacement programme O’r Senedd (From the Senedd) was launched in 2015.
