= Dewi Llwyd =

Welsh journalist and presenter

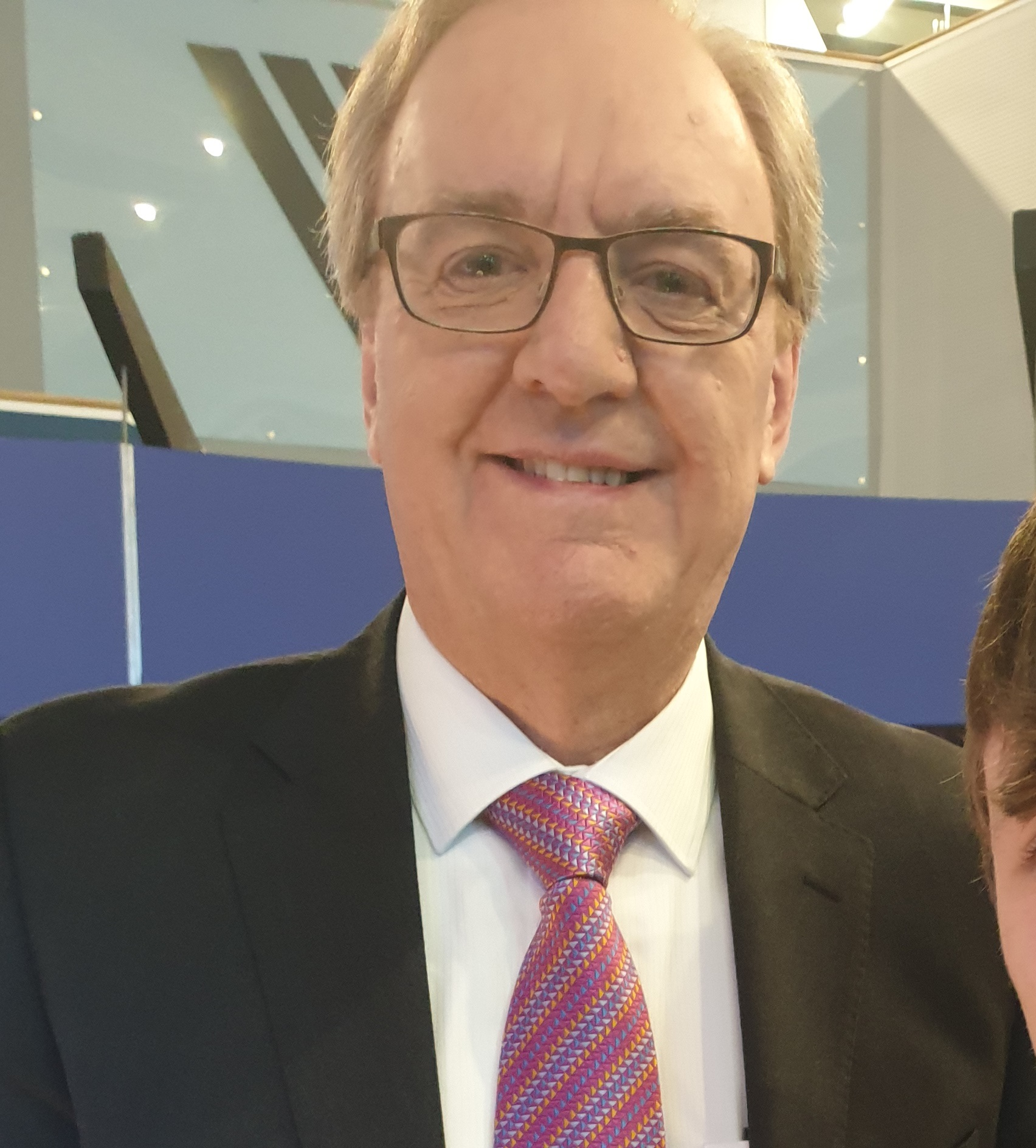
- Llwyd in 2019
- Born: Dewi Llwyd Williams; 26 March 1954 (age 71); Bangor
- Education: St. Paul's Primary School, Ysgol Friars
- Occupations: Journalist, television and radio broadcaster
- Years active: 1979–present
- Employer: BBC Cymru
- Known for: Newyddion; Pawb a'i Farn; Radio Cymru (Dewi Llwyd ar fore Sul, Hawl i Holi and Post Prynhawn)
- Spouse: Nia
- Parent(s): Reverend Ifor Ll. Williams (father); Mary (Mother)

Dewi Llwyd (born 1954) is a Welsh journalist and television presenter who is best known for his work for S4C. He presented the Welsh-language news programme Newyddion until the end of 2012, and Pawb a'i Farn until the end of 2019. Llwyd currently presents two radio programmes on BBC Radio Cymru.

== Biography ==
=== Early life ===
He was born Dewi Llwyd Williams in 1954. Llwyd is the son of the Rev. Ivor Ll. Williams, a Baptist minister and Mary. He grew up in Deiniolen and Morriston before his family settled in Bangor, Gwynedd before he reached the age of six. He went to St Pauls Primary School, before attending Friars School. Llwyd went to study at Cardiff University; he further studied in London, and later went to an education facility in Washington, D.C. He later spent time in education in France and Spain.

=== Career ===
Llwyd joined the BBC in 1980 as a parliamentary correspondent, and had been a regular presenter on the Welsh-language news programme Newyddion since it started. He left Newyddion at the end of 2012. He presented the political discussion program, Pawb a'i Farn, on S4C between 1998 and December 2019, and presents the radio programmes Dewi Llwyd ar fore Sul and Hawl i Holi on BBC Radio Cymru.

Llwyd presents the Welsh language coverage of UK General elections, referendums and Welsh Assembly elections. In 2017, Llwyd presented Etholiad 2017 (Election 2017) with the results of the 2017 United Kingdom general election in a joint broadcast between S4C and BBC Radio Cymru. He also presented Etholiad 2019, the Welsh language coverage of the results of the 2019 United Kingdom general election.
