= Ian Jones =

Ian Jones may refer to:

- Ian Jones (athlete), British bronze medal winner at the 2008 Summer Paralympics
- Ian Jones (author) (1931–2018), Australian author and film writer
- Ian Jones (cricketer) (born 1977), English cricketer
- Ian Jones (curler) (born 1968), Welsh wheelchair curler
- Ian Jones (Australian footballer) (born 1932), Australian rules footballer
- Ian Jones (Welsh footballer) (born 1976), German-born footballer
- Ian Jones (rugby union, born 1967) (born 1967), New Zealand rugby player
- Ian Jones (rugby union, born 1940) (1940–2015), Welsh rugby player
- Ian Jones (sportsman, born 1934) (1934–2016), English sportsman and academic
- Ian Jones (television executive) (born 1959), chief executive of S4C
- Ian Quayle Jones (born 1941), British banker
- Ian Jones-Quartey (born 1984), writer, storyboard artist, animator and voice actor
