= Ysgol Gymraeg Ystalyfera Bro Dur =

Welsh school

Coordinates: 51.7643°N 3.7831°W

Ysgol Gymraeg Ystalyfera-Bro Dur
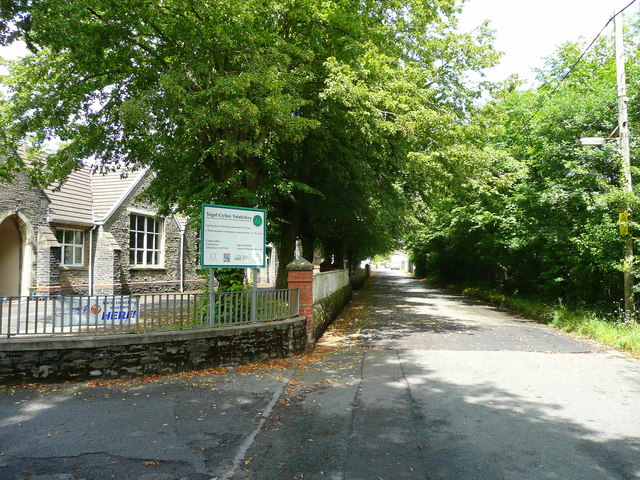

Location
- Glan-yr-Afon, Ystalyfera; Swansea, Neath Port Talbot County Borough Council, SA10 6EH; Wales

Information
- Other names: Ysgol Gymraeg Bro Dur
- Former name: Ysgol Gyfun Ystalyfera
- Type: Community school
- Motto: "Dysgu Gorau, Dysgu Byw." ("The best learning, learning to live.")
- Religious affiliation: Multiple
- Established: 1969
- Local authority: Neath Port-Talbot Council
- Head teacher: Laurel Davies
- Gender: Mixed
- Age range: 3–18
- Language: Welsh
- Houses: Gwenllian; Hywel; Llywellyn
- Colours: Royal Blue and Green
- Website: www.ysgolystalyferabrodur.cymru

Ysgol Gymraeg Ystalyfera Bro Dur is a Welsh-medium comprehensive school in Neath Port Talbot, Wales. The school provides education to three- to eighteen-year-old pupils in Neath Port Talbot and south Powys at three campuses in Ystalyfera and Port Talbot.

== History ==
The school was founded in 1969 as Ysgol Gyfun Ystalyfera (Ystalyfera Comprehensive School), on the site of the former Ystalyfera Grammar School. In 2017 the school merged with Ysgol Gynradd y Wern primary school to form an all-age school for ages three to eighteen. In September 2018 the Bro Dur ('Steel Land') campus opened in Port Talbot; it operates alongside the primary and secondary school campuses in Ystalyfera. A second Welsh-medium comprehensive campus named Ysgol Gyfun Gymraeg Bro Dur was opened; it is also referred to as Ystalyfera South.

== Notable alumni ==
Notable former pupils of Ystalyfera Grammar School and Ysgol Ystalyfera include:

- D. Gwenallt Jones (D. Gwenallt Jones, 1899–1968), poet
- Richard Aaron (1901–1987), philosopher
- Geoffrey Moses (born 1952), cricketer and classical singer
- Garry Owen (journalist) (born 1958), journalist and radio presenter
- Siân Lloyd (born 1958), television presenter
- Ian Jones (born 1959), television executive, chief executive of S4C
- Huw Chiswell (born 1961), actor and singer
- Sian Morris (born 1965), Commonwealth Games bronze medalist
- Steffan Rhodri (born 1967), actor
- Alun Cairns (born 1970), politician, former Secretary of State for Wales
- Derwyn Jones (born 1970), rugby union player for Cardiff and Wales
- Euros Lyn (born 1971), television director
- Jeremy Miles (born 1971), politician, Minister for Education and the Welsh Language
- Rhodri Owen (born 1972), radio and television presenter
- Kristian Phillips (born 1990), rugby union player for Bath, represented Wales at U18 and U20 levels.
- Ben Davies (born 1993), footballer for Tottenham Hotspur and Wales
- Iestyn Hopkins (born 2002), rugby union player for Ospreys
- Owen Williams (rugby union, born 1992) rugby union player for Ospreys and Wales
- Reuben Morgan-Williams (Born 1998), rugby union player for Ospreys
- Rubin Colwill (born 2002), footballer for Cardiff City and Wales
- Dan Edwards (rugby union) (born 2003), rugby union player for Ospreys and Wales
- Morgan Morse (born 2005), rugby union player for Ospreys
