= Geoffrey Moses =

Welsh cricketer and classical singer

Personal information
- Full name: Geoffrey Haydn Moses
- Born: 24 September 1952 (age 74); Mountain Ash, Glamorgan, Wales
- Batting: Left-handed
- Bowling: Right-arm fast-medium

Domestic team information
- Years: Team
- 1974: Cambridge University

Career statistics
Competition	First-class	List A
Matches	3	1
Runs scored	37	9
Batting average	18.50	9.00
100s/50s	–/–	–/–
Top score	24*	9
Balls bowled	432	66
Wickets	9	2
Bowling average	19.55	24.50
5 wickets in innings	1	–
10 wickets in match	–	–
Best bowling	5/31	2/49
Catches/stumpings	–/–	–/–
- Source: Cricinfo, 1 January 2022

Geoffrey Haydn Moses (born 24 September 1952) is a Welsh classical singer and former first-class cricketer.

Moses was born in September 1952 at Mountain Ash, Glamorgan. He was educated at Ystalyfera Grammar School, before going up to read history at Emmanuel College, Cambridge. While studying at Cambridge, he played first-class cricket for Cambridge University Cricket Club in 1974, making three appearances. He had one match of note, taking a five wicket haul in The University Match against Oxford University at Lord's. In his three matches, he took a total of 9 wickets with his right-arm fast-medium bowling. He also made a single List A one-day appearance for Cambridge in the 1974 Benson & Hedges Cup against Sussex at Hove, taking the wickets of Geoff Greenidge and Mark Faber for the cost of 49 runs from 11 overs, with Sussex winning the match by 186 runs.

After graduating from Cambridge, he taught at Charterhouse School. He subsequently trained to become an operatic baritone singer at the Guildhall School of Music and Drama under Bryan Drake; he later privately studied under Otakar Kraus. Moses has sung with all the major British opera companies, including The Royal Opera, the Welsh National Opera, as well as performing at the Glyndebourne Festival Opera. His discography includes Fotis in The Greek Passion conducted by Mackerras (1981), Ceprano in Rigoletto conducted by Sinopoli (1985), Hans Schwarz in Die Meistersinger von Nürnberg conducted by Haitink (1997) and Sancho in The Contrabandista under Corp (2004).
