= Téacs TG4 =

Téacs TG4 is the name of the Teletext service offered by the Irish-language television channel TG4 which has been operating since 1996 and produced by Europus a Galway-based Irish Language Consultancy service, who also provide subtitling services to TG4 and RTÉ. Initially when TG4) or TnaG as it was originally known, only provided limited teletext services, mainly the 888 subtitling service, since its re-branding as TG4 in 1999, a more comprehensive service has been provided.

== See also ==
- Sbectel - Welsh language teletext service
- Aertel - RTÉ teletext service
