= Planed Plant =

Welsh-language children's programme strand

- Network: S4C
- Launched: 1 November 1982; 43 years ago (as Y Clwb S4C)
- Closed: 23 April 2010; 16 years ago (as Planed Plant)
- Country of origin: Wales (United Kingdom)
- Formerly known as: Y Clwb S4C (1982–1990); Slot Meithrin (1990–1998); Slot 23 (1990–1994); 5 Pump (1994–1998); Planed Plant (1998–2010); Planed Plant Bach (1998–2008)
- Format: Children's programming
- Original language: Welsh

Planed Plant ("Children's Planet") was a strand of Welsh-language television programming for children broadcast by S4C. It first aired in September 1998. Back then, it had previous names and services, like Y Clwb S4C (1982–1990, when the channel itself was first launched), Slot Meithrin (1990–1998), Slot 23 (1990–1994), and 5 Pump (1994–1998).

== Background ==
Planed Plant included imported animated programmes such as Yu-Gi-Oh!, Sabrina, Horseland and Dennis and Gnasher, dubbed into Welsh. It also featured a number of Welsh-produced programmes. Uned 5, the channel's flagship youth magazine show, was often introduced by Planed Plant until April 2005 when the programme moved to a new prime-time slot.

Planed Plant won a Bafta Cymru in 2003 for the programme's graphics and titles.

Until 26 October 2007 production of Planed Plant was in-house. This was replaced by a service from independent production company Boomerang. As part of the changes, the previous presentation team (Alex Jones, Mari Grug, Alun Williams) were replaced by a new team of announcers/presenters. Newcomers Geraint Hardy and Meleri Williams began presenting the 4-6pm strand for older children (Planed Plant). Williams left the presentation strand after eleven months and was replaced by Lois Cernyw and Tudur Phillips.

Planed Plant was shown on S4C weekdays between 16.00 & 17.00 on analogue and 16:00 & 18:00 on digital. In 2010, S4C replaced it with a similar children's block called Stwnsh.

Slot Meithrin on 17 September 1990 until 16 September 1998, Planed Plant (pre school version) on 17 September 1998 until December 2001 and Planed Plant Bach ("Small Children's Planet"), the services for nursery age children, were replaced by Cyw ("Chick") on 23 June 2008.

== Previous names and services ==
- Y Clwb S4C (1 November 1982 (when the channel itself was first launched) – 14 September 1990)
- Slot Meithrin (17 September 1990 – 16 September 1998)
- Slot 23 (17 September 1990 – 30 April 1994)
- 5 Pump (5 September 1994 – 16 September 1998)
- Planed Plant (17 September 1998 – 23 April 2010)
- Planed Plant Bach (14 October 1998 (as Planed Plant until December 2001)– 22 April 2008)

== Presenters ==
Continuity presenters in the past include:

- Branwen Gwyn
- Elain Edwards
- Lisa Gwilym
- Sarra Elgan
- Rhydian Bowen Phillips
- Glyn Wise (as a guest presenter)
- Alex Jones
- Mari Grug
- Alun Williams
- Rhodri Owen
- Elen Pencwm

== See also ==
- Síle – Similar strand of programmes on Irish language channel TG4
- Cyw (23 June 2008 – present)
- Stwnsh (26 April 2010 – present)
