= Ian Jones (television executive) =

Welsh television executive (born 1959)

Ian Jones (born 14 January 1959) is a Welsh television executive who served as the chief executive of S4C from 2011 to 2017.

== Personal life and education ==
Jones was born in Morriston, Swansea in 1959 to Margaret Jones and Lyle Jones. Educated at Ysgol Gyfun Ystalyfera, he studied economics at Aberystwyth University.

== Career ==
Jones was a commissioning executive and was part of the launch team at S4C in 1982, remaining at the channel until 1985 when he joined ITV as a unit manager in its entertainment division.

From 1987 to 1989 Jones was an independent television producer, before returning to S4C as director of its business and international arm.

Jones left S4C again in 1996 to become director of STV's international division, and in 2000 was briefly STV's chief operating officer. Jones left STV later in 2000 to become deputy managing director of Granada's international division until 2004.

From 2004 to 2007 Jones was president of National Geographic TV International, and subsequently held roles at Target Entertainment Group and A&E Networks before being appointed S4C's chief executive in October 2011.

Ian Jones left S4C in October 2017 and was succeeded by Owen Evans.

== Public appointments and awards ==
- Victim Support, trustee, Wales
- Creative Diversity Network, director
- Wales Tourism Advisory Board, member
- BAFTA Cymru, former chairman
- Aberystwyth University, honorary fellow
