= ITV Select =

Ownership
- Owner: Carlton Communications and Granada plc

History
- Launched: 1 May 2000; 26 years ago
- Closed: 23 April 2002; 24 years ago
- Former names: ONrequest (2000–2001)

Availability

Terrestrial
- ITV Digital: Channels 50–55

ITV Select was a pay-per-view channel that was owned by Carlton Communications and Granada plc. The channel, which was part of the ONdigital platform, launched on 1 May 2000 as ONrequest and showed films, sport events and exclusive footage. As of July 2000, content was provided under a contract by Universal and Paramount Studios. The service was rebranded as ITV Select in 2001 and closed on 23 April 2002, shortly before the collapse of ITV Digital.

== See also ==
- ITV Digital
