= Stwnsh =

Welsh children's television strand

- Stwnsh logo
- Network: S4C
- Launched: 26 April 2010; 16 years ago
- Country of origin: United Kingdom (Wales)
- Format: Children's programming
- Running time: As of 2019: Monday-Friday 5pm–6pm; Saturday 8am–10am
- Original language: Welsh
- Official website: Official website

Stwnsh (Mash, Welsh pronunciation: [stʊnʃ]) is a strand of Welsh-language children's television programming on S4C, aimed at children between the ages of 7 to 13.

Stwnsh was launched on Monday 26 April 2010, replacing the former Welsh-language children's strand, Planed Plant (Welsh for 'Children's Planet'). Stwnsh is broadcast on S4C every weekday, from 5.00pm to 6.00pm, and on Saturdays as Stwnsh Sadwrn (Welsh for 'Saturday 'Stwnsh'') from 8.00am to 10.00am.

== Programmes ==
The programmes shown as part of this service include both brand-new programmes and programmes that were previously shown as part of Planed Plant.

=== Other programmes ===
The long-running programme Uned 5 (Welsh for 'Unit 5') was scrapped by S4C to make way for Stwnsh service, although the final episode of Uned 5, was not broadcast until Sunday 30 May 2010, just over a month after the launch of the Stwnsh service.

== See also ==
- Hacio, Welsh language current affairs programme, for young people.
- Cyw, strand of Welsh language programming, for younger children.
- Cúla 4, strand of Irish language programming for children.
