= Sbectel =

Sbectel (Welsh pronunciation: [ˈspɛktɛl]) is the name of S4C's former ancillary teletext service. It was named after the Welsh language S4C programme magazine called Sbec (Welsh for 'peek') which was originally a pull-out of the TVTimes in the HTV Wales area.

== Content ==
Sbectel provided listings and information about S4C's programmes, such as previews of programmes and further information related to the programmes. Pages were provided in both Welsh and English. The programme was separate from the auxiliary and separately-licensed teletext service also available on the channel. Sbectel also provided subtitles for S4C's programmes on page 888 in English and page 889 in Welsh.

== History ==
Sbectel was first run in conjunction with ORACLE, the auxiliary teletext provider on Channel 4 in the 1980s. Sbectel occupied pages 410-499 within the page space.

When ORACLE lost its licence and was replaced by Teletext Ltd. in 1993, Sbectel moved to its own page space on pages 300-399 and became directly run by S4C.

In 2003, Sbectel moved to pages 400-499 (which replaced pages 300-399 as S4C's page space). This was due to Channel 4 (the equivalent of S4C in the United Kingdom outside Wales) closing their Sbectel equivalent, FourText (formerly 4-Tel), and launching a new teletext service in conjunction with Teletext Ltd, Teletext on 4, on pages 400–499.

In September 2007, the bilingual digital text service available on S4C Digidol was launched only to Freeview viewers in Wales.

When the first area in Wales (most of South West Wales) completed its Digital Switchover on 9 September 2009, 'Sbectel' also ceased. Partly it has been replaced by service pages from S4C and BBC on the internet.

== See also ==
- Téacs TG4 – Irish language teletext service
