= Annan Committee =

1974 committee discussing the future of British broadcasting

The Annan Committee on the future of broadcasting was established in April 1974 to discuss the United Kingdom broadcasting industry, including new technologies and their funding, the role and funding of the BBC, Independent Broadcasting Authority and programme standards.

The report found that ITV programs' quality was comparable to BBC's's, and ITN was superior to BBC News.

On 3 February 1977, the committee recommended:

- Changes to BBC funding by licence fee
- Fourth, independent, television channel, but controlled by a new Open Broadcasting Authority
- Long-term restructure and diversification of broadcasting
- Establishment of Broadcasting Complaints Commission
- Privatisation of local radio
- Independence from direct political control
- Increase in independent production

== Outcomes ==
- Increased licence fee
- Channel 4 (England, Scotland and Northern Ireland) and S4C (Wales) - implemented in 1980
- Fourth Channel being of a more "open" nature rather than one of balance such as the BBC

== Members ==
- Lord Annan
- Peter Goldman
- Professor Hilde Himmelweit
- Tom Jackson
- Sir Antony Jay
- Marghanita Laski
- Hilda M. Lawrence
- Dewi Lewis
- Sir James Mackay
- The Hon. Mrs Charles Morrison
- Dipak Nandy
- John G. Parkes
- John Pollock
- Professor Geoffrey Sims
- Phillip Whitehead MP
- Sir Marcus Worsley
