= Newyddion =

Welsh-language news programme

- Newyddion S4C title card
- Also known as: Newyddion Saith (1982–1988); Newyddion 9 (2013–2020)
- Newyddion S4C
- Genre: News broadcasting
- Presented by: Bethan Rhys Roberts; Rhodri Llywelyn; (Main anchors)
- Country of origin: Wales
- Original language: Welsh (Though English is partially spoken in some reports)

Production
- Production locations: New Broadcasting House, Cardiff, Wales
- Running time: 30 minutes (main bulletin)
- Production company: BBC Cymru Wales

Original release
- Network: S4C
- Release: 1 November 1982 – present

Related
- Heddiw; Newyddion Ni; Ne-wff-ion

Newyddion S4C (S4C News) is a Welsh-language television news programme broadcast on S4C and produced by BBC Cymru Wales. It has been broadcasting since S4C launched on 1 November 1982.

== History ==
Welsh-language television news on the BBC began at 6pm on 16 March 1956 in the form of Tele-Newyddion, a weekly 15-minute newsreel broadcast as an opt-out on the Wenvoe, Sutton Coldfield and Holme Moss transmitting stations.

Coverage was expanded with the launch of Heddiw as a 20-minute topical magazine programme, first broadcast at 1.05pm on 17 April 1961, preceded by a five-minute news bulletin.

Both the BBC and HTV Cymru Wales bid for the provision of a news service for the new channel, but in 1981, HTV's decision to withdraw (following disagreements with ITN over the use of its material) saw the BBC win the contract by default.

Heddiw was broadcast for the last time at 7.05pm on Friday 30 July 1982 and replaced by short news bulletins as the BBC prepared to launch the nightly Newyddion Saith programme for S4C on 1 November 1982.

In 2020, S4C launched an online Newyddion service, employing its own journalists and producing original stories, that would be repackaged for the television bulletin.

== Overview ==
The main evening programme (branded Newyddion S4C) is broadcast from BBC Cymru Wales' headquarters in Cardiff each weekday evening at 7:30pm with shorter editions airing throughout the day and at varying times for 15 minutes on weekend evenings. The programmes broadcast from the same studio used by BBC Wales Today.

Five-minute updates are broadcast at midday, mid-afternoon (2pm, 3pm), and evenings (8:55pm).

Dewi Llwyd, who presented the programme for almost 30 years, was dropped from the presentation team in 2013.

S4C weather forecasts are broadcast in the news programme.

== Children's spin-offs ==
Spin-offs of Newyddion have been created for younger audiences. These include Newyddion Ni (My News) for school-age children and Ne-wff-ion for pre-school children.

Newyddion Ni is the successor to S4C's previous news programme for school-age children, Ffeil. It mainly covers general topics and sport. Newyddion Ni is presented by Siôn Tomos Williams.

Ne-wff-ion covers general topics in a perspective that pre-school children can easily understand. There are no human presenters; instead, two dog puppets act as the presenters.

== Awards ==
Newyddion won the 2012 BAFTA Cymru Award for News Coverage for a special programme broadcast from New York to mark the tenth anniversary of the 11 September 2001 attacks.

At the 2013 BAFTA Cymru Awards ceremony Newyddion was mistakenly awarded the News Coverage award. The award was later correctly presented to ITV Cymru Wales.

At the 2015 BAFTA Cymru Awards Newyddion 9 was awarded the News Coverage Award for a special programme on the Paris Attacks.

They also won the News Coverage Award at the 2016 BAFTA Cymru awards for a programme about the refugee crisis.

== Ratings ==
Viewing figures for Newyddion ranged at one time from 180,000 to 250,000 according to S4C's weekly ratings report.
