= S4C Authority =

Independent public body in Wales

- Awdurdod S4C
- Formation: 1981; Cardiff, Wales, United Kingdom
- Type: Statutory corporation
- Location: Carmarthen, Wales, United Kingdom
- Region served: Wales

The S4C Authority (Welsh: Awdurdod S4C) was an independent public body appointed by the United Kingdom Government's Secretary of State for Culture, Media and Sport to oversee the management of the Welsh-language television channel S4C. Although an independent body, the authority worked in conjunction with the UK-wide broadcasting and telecommunications regulator Ofcom, who have responsibility for regulating S4C's output.

In the spending review which he presented to the House of Commons on 20 October 2010, the Chancellor of the Exchequer, George Osborne, announced that part of the responsibility for funding S4C was to be transferred to the BBC. On 10 August 2012, the BBC Trust, Ofcom and the S4C Authority launched a public consultation on a draft Operating Agreement concluded between the two broadcasters and setting out their relationship from 1 April 2013, the date following which it was intended that most of S4C's funding was to come from the BBC licence fee.

Following an independent review of S4C, the S4C Authority was replaced with a unitary board in 2018. The new S4C board operated in shadow form until it was put into law by the Media Act 2024, with the S4C Authority being formally replaced on 23 August 2024.
