= S4C Dau =

Former Welsh-language television channel (1999–2010)

- Final logo used from 2007 to 2010
- Country: United Kingdom (Wales)

Ownership
- Owner: S4C
- Sister channels: S4C

History
- Launched: 15 September 1999; 26 years ago
- Closed: 6 December 2010; 15 years ago
- Former names: S4C2 (15 September 1999 – 18 January 2007)

Availability (Prior to closure)

Terrestrial
- Freeview: Channel 86 (Wales only)

S4C Dau (Welsh: Sianel Pedwar Cymru Dau, meaning Channel Four Wales Two, formerly branded S4C2) was a free-to-air Welsh television station owned by S4C which, until 2010, broadcast coverage of the Senedd at the Senedd building. It was also used for extended coverage of events shown on the main S4C service, such as the National Eisteddfod of Wales and Royal Welsh Show.

== History ==
=== Launch ===
When the UK government was planning digital terrestrial television in the late 1990s, each of the existing analogue broadcasters were allocated half a multiplex of capacity each. Each multiplex has capacity to carry multiple television stations. As one of the existing analogue broadcasters, S4C were allocated half of multiplex A and decided to use their gifted capacity to broadcast two stations in Wales; S4C Digidol, a partial simulcast of their analogue television station and S4C2, a new service. Outside of Wales, they opted to sell their capacity to pay-TV broadcaster ONdigital to use for their service, meaning that S4C2 was only broadcast from transmitters located within Wales.

Channel logo used from launch in 1999 until 2007

The channel launched on 15 September 1999 as a free-to-air channel on the ONdigital platform using S4C's gifted capacity on multiplex A, and later Sky and NTL. It formed part of the Freeview service and cable throughout Wales, but was available throughout the United Kingdom on Freesat and Sky.

The channel initially broadcast all proceedings from the National Assembly for Wales, live and uninterrupted. As the Assembly is bilingual, with members allowed to speak in either English or Welsh, the service carried two audio feeds on Freeview and satellite; an untranslated feed that broadcast proceedings in their original language (be it English or Welsh) and an English feed where any Welsh speech was voiced-over live into English. The channel was described by S4C as a 'unique partnership' between themselves as the broadcaster and BBC Cymru Wales as the service provider. As such, the costs of producing the Assembly output were funded by BBC Wales, while the costs of distribution were met by S4C. S4C did not receive additional funding from the government to cover the costs of running the service, and couldn't divert public money intended to fund content for its main channel, as S4C2 was neither classed as a public service channel, nor was there any obligation for S4C to run such a service. As such, S4C's costs for the channel was funded from commercial revenues and the channel itself was operated through a commercial subsidiary of S4C, S4C2 Ltd., who held the broadcast licence.

S4C2 was also used for interactive programming and alternate programming that couldn't be aired on the main S4C channel, such as uninterrupted coverage of competitions from the National Eisteddfod of Wales, the Urdd National Eisteddfod, the Royal Welsh Show and Goreuon Can i Gymru's sing-along feature (Best of Song for Wales, a yearly Welsh music competition).

On 18 January 2007, as part of a rebrand of S4C's services, S4C2's logo was changed, with the channel now identified as S4C Dau/S4C Two.

=== Removal of Assembly coverage ===
As part a consultation into provision of a new children's service in 2007, S4C identified that there was a large amount of capacity being unused by the S4C2 service when the Assembly was not in session. They suggested two proposals they considered viable, one of which would see the children's service operate in the downtime around the Assembly coverage, while the other would see the Assembly coverage removed altogether and S4C2 changed into a full-time children's channel.

From January 2010, coverage of the National Assembly for Wales proceedings ceased on the channel. This programming was produced by the BBC and was made available online via the Democracy Live section of the BBC's website.

In March 2010, the broadcaster announced it would resume broadcasts of the Assembly's full sessions and some committees in a new thrice-weekly overnight programme entitled Y Dydd yn Y Cynulliad (The Day in the Assembly) on its main S4C service from Tuesday 20 April 2010.

=== Closure ===
On 16 September 2010, S4C2 was removed from Sky channel 507. It was also removed from Virgin Media channel 168 during October and Freeview channel 86 on 30 November 2010, in both cases the channel was only available in Wales. The channel finally ceased broadcasting on 6 December 2010, when it was removed from Freesat. S4C confirmed the channel's closure in January 2011, where they said its live coverage from the National Eisteddfod and Royal Welsh show would be more heavily featured on the main S4C channel, whilst recorded coverage of the Assembly would continue to be broadcast on the main channel in its late night slot. S4C cited budget cuts from the Department for Culture, Media and Sport (DCMS) as the reason for closing the service. As part of the UK Government spending review announced in October 2010, S4C's budget was to be cut by 25% by 2015.
