= South Wales =

Region of Wales

Coordinates: 51°42′N 3°24′W

Map of one definition of South Wales, combining common definitions of South East and South West Wales, including Carmarthenshire and Pembrokeshire, which may also be considered West Wales. Areas shaded light red are historically considered South Wales, but may be considered Mid Wales today. Other definitions of the region exist.

South Wales (Welsh: De Cymru [ˌdeː ˌkəmri]) is a loosely defined region of Wales bordered by England to the east and mid Wales to the north. Generally considered to include the historic counties of Glamorgan and Monmouthshire, south Wales extends westwards to include Carmarthenshire and Pembrokeshire. In the western extent, from Swansea westwards, local people would probably recognise that they lived in both south Wales and west Wales. The Brecon Beacons National Park covers about a third of south Wales, containing Pen y Fan, the highest British mountain south of Cadair Idris in Snowdonia.

South Wales is easily the most inhabited and urban area in Wales. The country’s capital, Cardiff is in the area, along with cities like Newport and Swansea and towns like Merthyr Tydfil and Barry. This is due to the industrial past of South Wales, where small towns became cities with money from industries such as mining, smelting and shipping.

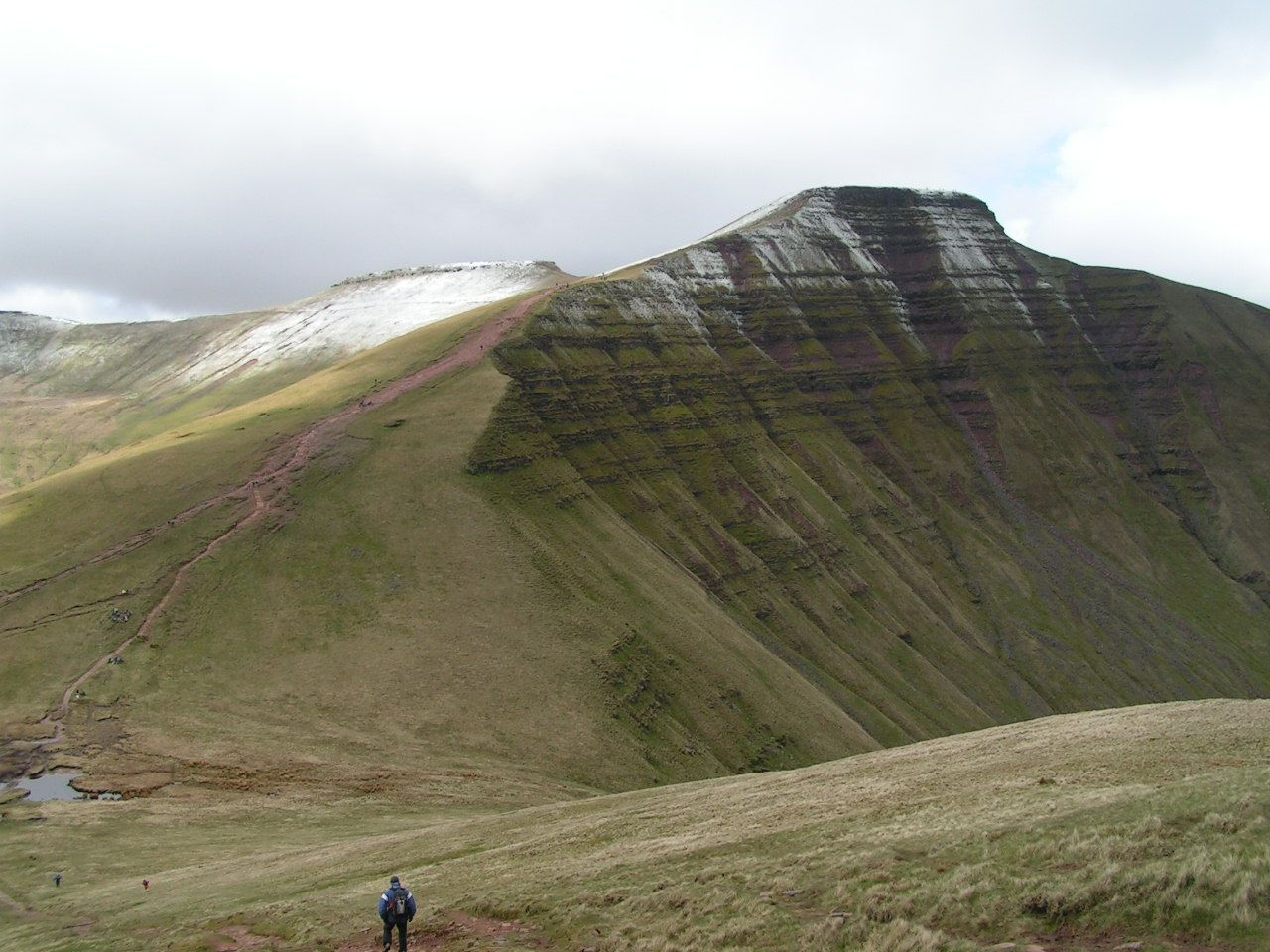
Pen y Fan 2,907 ft (886 metres)

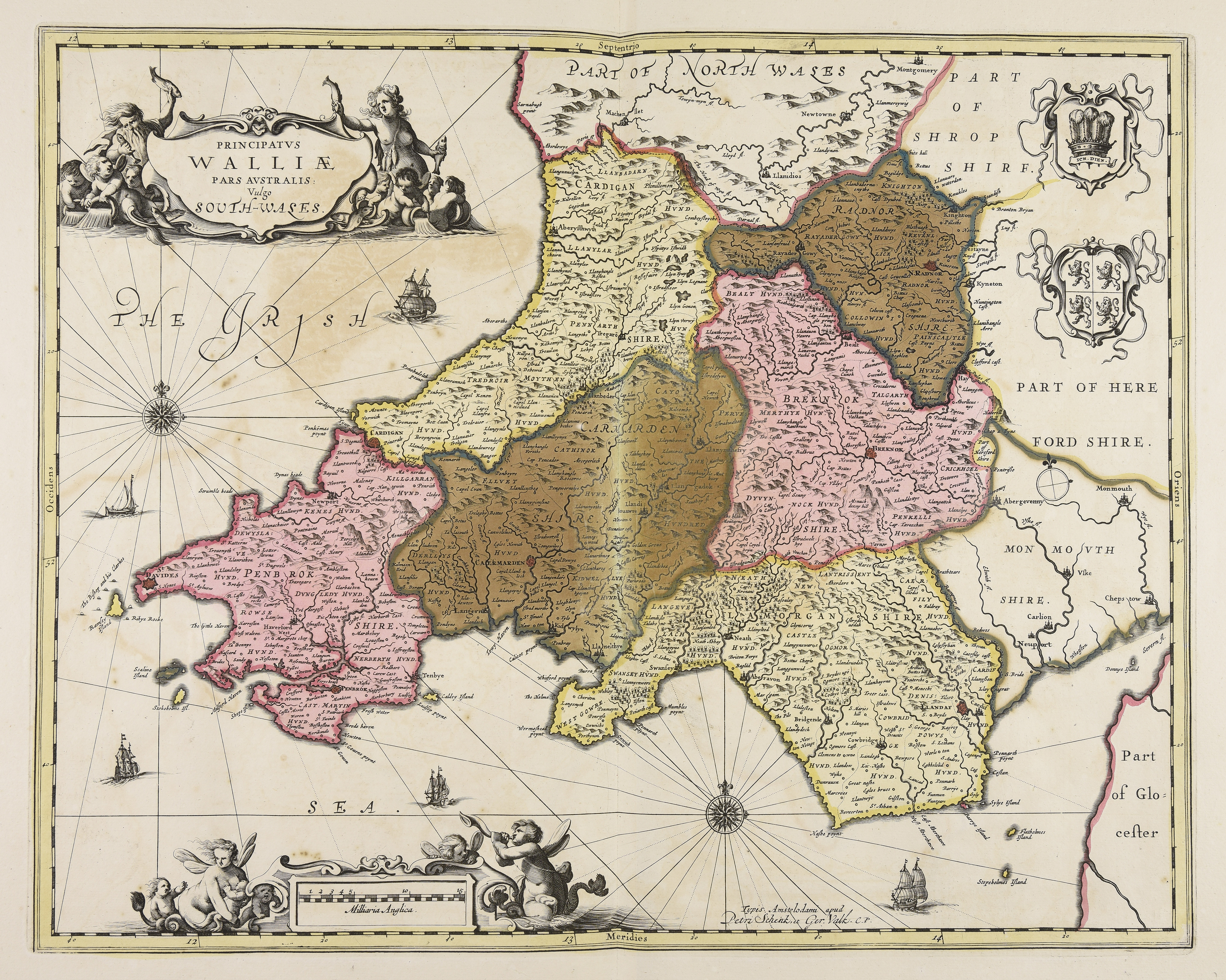
17-18th century map of South Wales with Monmouthshire considered in this map to be part of England.

A point of some discussion is whether the first element of the name should be capitalised: 'south Wales' or 'South Wales'. As the name is a geographical expression rather than a specific area with well-defined borders, style guides such as those of the BBC and The Guardian use the form 'south Wales'. The Welsh Government, in their international gateway website, Wales.com, state that it should always be capitalised; however, they use the term to refer to a tourism marketing area which excludes the Swansea and Neath Port Talbot local authority areas (placing them in 'West Wales'). In contradiction, the style guide for the Welsh Government's main website, Gov.wales, uses 'south Wales'. It is always capitalised on motorway signs.

A definition of South Wales, spanning an area from Pembrokeshire in the west, to Monmouthshire in the east, and northwards to Brecon (in Powys) and Brecon Beacons National Park, attracts over 43 million visitors annually, according to the South Wales Guide.

== History ==
Between the Statute of Rhuddlan of 1284 and the Laws in Wales Act 1535, crown land in Wales formed the Principality of Wales. This was divided into a Principality of south Wales and a Principality of north Wales. The southern principality was made up of the counties of Ceredigion and Carmarthenshire, areas that had previously been part of the Welsh kingdom of Deheubarth ('the southern land'). The legal responsibility for this area lay in the hands of the Justiciar of South Wales based at Carmarthen. Other parts of southern Wales were in the hands of various Marcher Lords.

The Laws in Wales Acts 1542 created the Court of Great Sessions in Wales based on four legal circuits. The Brecon circuit served the counties of Brecknockshire, Radnorshire and Glamorgan while the Carmarthen circuit served Cardiganshire, Carmarthenshire and Pembrokeshire. Monmouthshire was attached to the Oxford circuit for judicial purposes. These seven southern counties were thus differentiated from the six counties of north Wales.

The Court of the Great Sessions came to an end in 1830, but the counties survived until the Local Government Act 1972 which came into operation in 1974. The creation of the county of Powys merged one northern county (Montgomeryshire) with two southern ones (Breconshire and Radnorshire).

There are thus different concepts of south Wales. Glamorgan and Monmouthshire are generally accepted by all as being in south Wales. But the status of Breconshire or Carmarthenshire, for instance, is more debatable. In the western extent, from Swansea westwards, local people might feel that they live in both south Wales and west Wales. Areas to the north of the Brecon Beacons and Black Mountains are generally considered to be in Mid Wales. The valleys and upland mountain ridges were once a very rural area noted for its river valleys and ancient forests and lauded by romantic poets such as William Wordsworth as well as poets in the Welsh language, although the interests of the latter lay more in society and culture than in the evocation of natural scenery. This natural environment changed to a considerable extent during the early Industrial Revolution when the Glamorgan and Monmouthshire valley areas were exploited for coal and iron. By the 1830s, hundreds of tons of coal were being transported by barge to ports in Cardiff and Newport. In the 1870s, coal was transported by rail transport networks to Newport Docks, at the time the largest coal exporting docks in the world, and by the 1880s coal was being exported from Barry, Vale of Glamorgan.

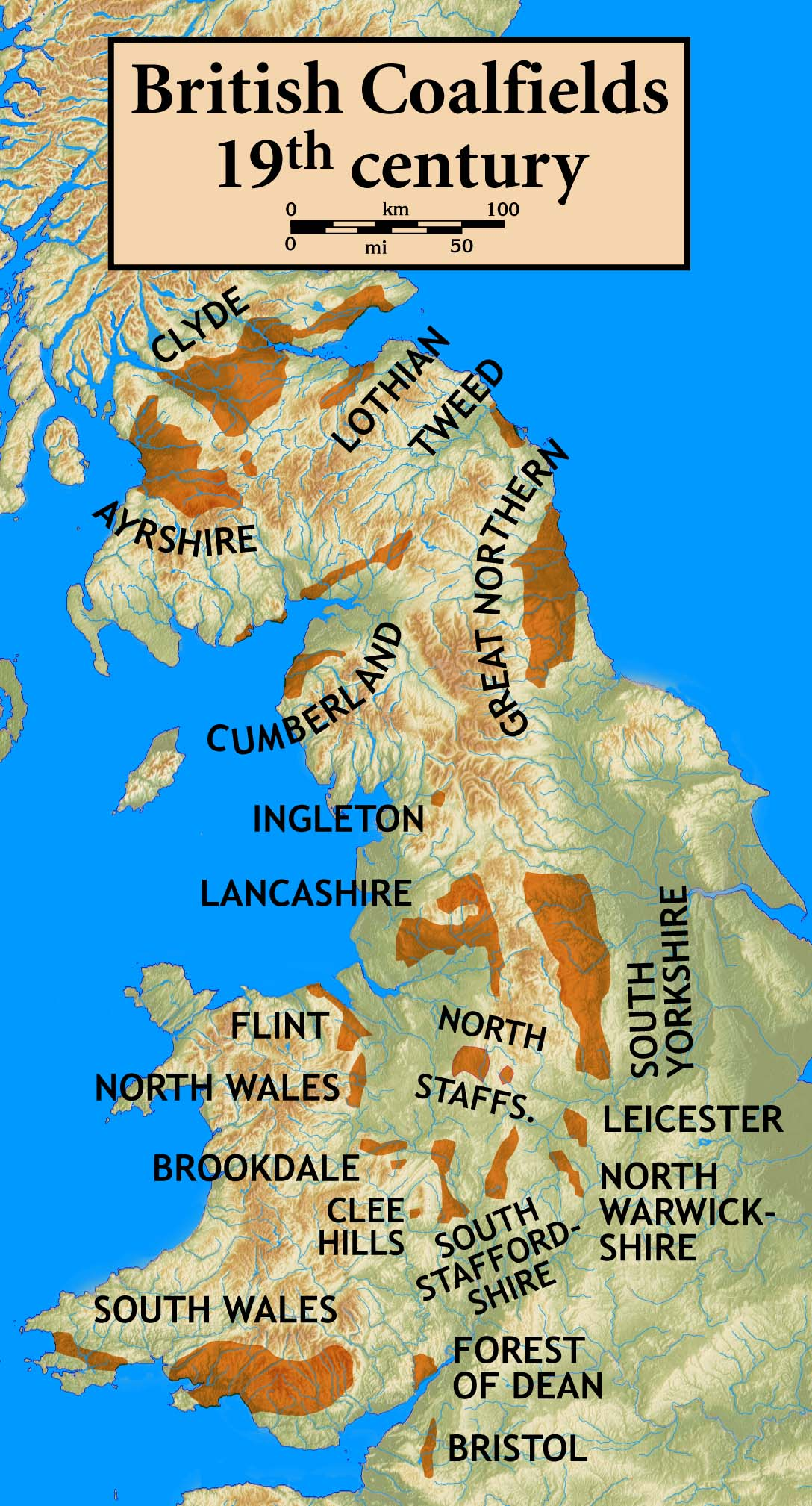

The Marquess of Bute, who owned much of the land north of Cardiff, built a steam railway system on his land that stretched from Cardiff into many of the South Wales Valleys where the coal was being found. Lord Bute then charged fees per ton of coal that was transported out using his railways. With coal mining and iron smelting being the main trades of south Wales, many thousands of immigrants from the Midlands, Scotland, Ireland, Cornwall, and even Italy came and set up homes and put down roots in the region. Very many came from other coal mining areas such as Somerset, the Forest of Dean in Gloucestershire and the tin mines of Cornwall such as Geevor Tin Mine, as a large but experienced and willing workforce was required. Whilst some of the migrants left, many settled and established in the south Wales Valleys between Swansea and Abergavenny as English-speaking communities with a unique identity. Industrial workers were housed in cottages and terraced houses close to the mines and foundries in which they worked. The large influx over the years caused overcrowding which led to outbreaks of Cholera, and on the social and cultural side, the near-loss of the Welsh language in the area.

The 1930s inter-war Great Depression in the United Kingdom saw the loss of almost half of the coal pits in the South Wales Coalfield, and their number declined further in the years following World War II. This number is now very low, following the UK miners' strike (1984–85), and the last 'traditional' deep-shaft mine, Tower Colliery, closed in January 2008.

Despite the intense industrialisation of the coal mining valleys, many parts of the landscape of South Wales such as the upper Neath valley, the Vale of Glamorgan and the valleys of the River Usk and River Wye remain distinctly beautiful and unspoilt and have been designated Sites of Special Scientific Interest. In addition, many once heavily industrialised sites have reverted to wilderness, some provided with a series of cycle tracks and other outdoor amenities. Large areas of forestry and open moorland also contribute to the amenity of the landscape.

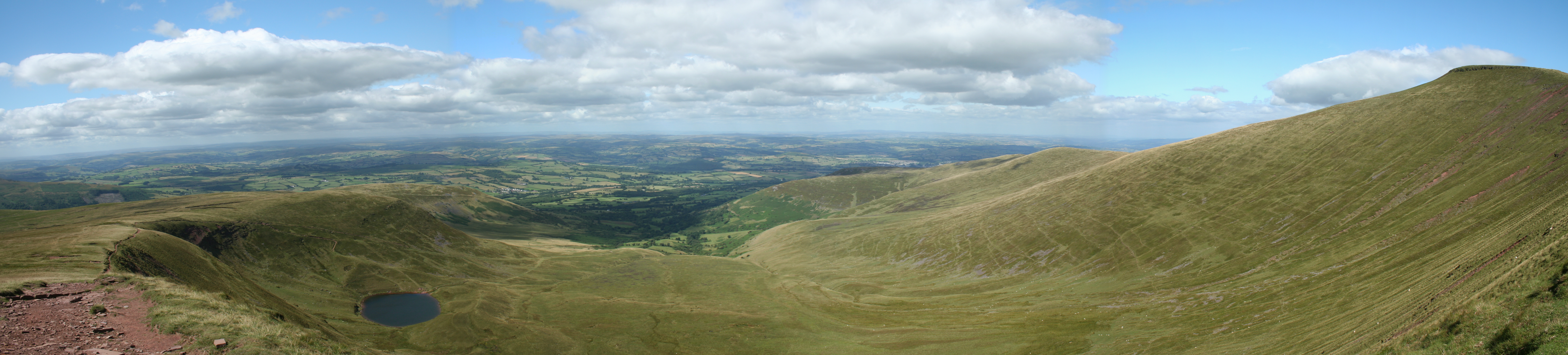
View north into Cwm Llwch from Corn Du, in the Brecon Beacons

== Industrialised areas in the 19th and 20th centuries ==
Merthyr Tydfil (Welsh: Merthyr Tudful) grew around the Dowlais Ironworks which was founded to exploit the locally abundant seams of iron ore, and in time it became the largest iron-producing town in the world. New coal mines were sunk nearby to feed the furnaces and in time produced coal for export. By the 1831 census, the population of Merthyr was 60,000—more at that time than Cardiff, Swansea and Newport combined—and its industries included coal mines, iron works, cable factory, engine sheds and sidings and many others. The town was also the birthplace of Joseph Parry, composer of the song Myfanwy.

The Heads of the Valleys towns, including Rhymney, Tredegar and Ebbw Vale, rose out of the industrial revolution, producing coal, metal ores and later steel.

Aberfan: The Merthyr Vale colliery began to produce coal in 1875. Spoil from the mine workings was piled on the hills close to the village which grew nearby. Tipping went on until the 1960s. Although nationalised, the National Coal Board failed to appreciate the danger they had created. In October 1966, heavy rain made the giant coal tip unstable, resulting in the Aberfan disaster. The recent dumping of small particles of coal and ash known as 'tailings' seems to have been partly responsible. A 30-foot-high (9 m) black wave tore downhill across the Glamorganshire Canal and swept away houses on its path towards the village school. 114 children and 28 adults were killed.

The Rhondda Valleys (Rhondda Fach and Rhondda Fawr) housed around 3,000 people in 1860, but by 1910 the population had soared to 160,000. The Rhondda had become the heart of a massive South Wales coal industry. Mining accidents below ground were common, and in 1896 fifty-seven men and boys were killed in a gas explosion at the Tylorstown Colliery. An enquiry found that the pit involved had not been properly inspected over the previous 15 months.

Ebbw Vale, the valley of the Ebbw River which stretches from the town of Ebbw Vale to Newport, includes the mining towns and villages of Newbridge, Risca, Crumlin, Abercarn and Cwmcarn. The Carboniferous Black Vein coal seams in the area lay some 900 feet (275 metres) below the surface and the mining activity associated with it was responsible for many tragic subsurface explosions, roof collapses and mining accidents.

Now the Valleys' heavy industrial past is overprinted with urban regeneration, tourism and multi-national investment. Large factory units, either empty or turned over to retail use, bear witness to the lack of success in replacing older industries.

== Language ==
The native language of the majority of people in South Wales was historically Welsh, but is now English. However, there are still significant numbers of Welsh speakers. In western parts of Glamorgan, particularly the Neath and Swansea Valleys, there remain significant Welsh-speaking communities such as Ystradgynlais and Ystalyfera, which share a heritage with other ex-anthracite mining areas in eastern Carmarthenshire, as much as with the Glamorgan valleys.

The local slang, dialect and phrases of the South Wales Valleys communities have been referred to as 'Wenglish', and are often used with comic effect. The dialect is found in such coastal towns as Barry, as featured in the BBC comedy series, Gavin & Stacey.

Welsh is now a compulsory language up to GCSE level for all students who start their education in Wales. Several secondary schools offering Welsh medium education operate in this area, for example Ysgol Gyfun Llanhari in Pontyclun, Ysgol Gyfun Y Cymmer in Porth in the Rhondda, Ysgol Gyfun Rhydywaun in Penywaun in the Cynon Valley, Ysgol Gyfun Gwynllyw in Pontypool, Ysgol Gyfun Cwm Rhymni in Blackwood, Ysgol Gymraeg Plasmawr in Cardiff and Ysgol Gyfun Garth Olwg in Church Village.

A significant number of people from ethnic minority communities speak another language as their first language, particularly in Cardiff and Newport. Commonly spoken languages in some areas include Punjabi, Bengali, Arabic, Somali and Chinese, and increasingly Central European languages such as Polish.

In the 19th and early 20th centuries, there was a vigorous literary and musical culture centred round eisteddfodau. Despite a few timid attempts to emulate this literature in English, it can be argued that few writers seem to connect with either the landscape or the literary tradition. The one exception, to some extent, can be considered to be Dylan Thomas.

== Culture ==
- Welsh Factor was a local competition for people to get feedback from judges and past contestants and to help people conquer their fear of performing in a safe space. During the COVID-19 pandemic Welsh Factor was indefinitely postponed as the 2019/2020 series was impacted by the pandemic.

== Religion ==
The South Wales landscape is marked by numerous chapels, places of worship (past and present) of the various Christian Nonconformist congregations. The Baptist congregation at Ilston, Gower, moved to Swansea, Massachusetts, but after the restoration of the Anglican worship with the issue of the Book of Common Prayer in 1662, several "gathered" churches survived belonging to the Baptist, Independent and Presbyterian denominations. In the 18th century members of some of these congregations became dissatisfied with the theological innovations of some trained ministers, and created new congregations such as that at Hengoed near Ystrad Mynach. In the same century, churches were sometimes involved in the Methodist movement, especially at Groeswen and Watford near Caerphilly, which both received frequent visits from John Wesley The largest denomination, however, became the Calvinistic Methodists (later the Presbyterian Church of Wales), whose chapels can be seen in many parts.

These were mainly Welsh-language congregations. Anglicanism in South Wales became autonomous from the Church of England with the Welsh Church Act 1914, but the immediate demise of the denomination feared at that time has not taken place in the Church in Wales. There are a number of Brethren Assemblies in Cardiff and in the Swansea area and Free Presbyterian Churches in Rhiwderin, near Newport and at Merthyr Tydfil. The Roman Catholic community, despite systematic persecution, survived in the 17th to 19th centuries, especially in Brecon and among minor gentry such as the Vaughans of Welsh Bicknor, on the Monmouthshire–Herefordshire border. Among members of foreign origin of later urban Catholic congregations were the Bracchi, Italians in the café and catering trades often from Bardi in the Apennines.

Post-war diversity has brought mosques, especially in Cardiff and Newport, Sikh gurdwaras, including one on the mountain near Abercynon and a growing number of Evangelical and Pentecostal congregations. These often add a strongly international element into local life, such as the "Pont" twinning project between Pontypridd and Mbale, Uganda, and the creation of "Fairtrade" relationships with primary producers worldwide.

== Industry today ==
The former heavy industries of coal and iron production have disappeared since the economic struggles of the 1970s, with the closures of that decade continuing sharply into the 1980s, and by July 1985 just 31 coal pits remained in the region. Further closures left the region with just one deep mine by the early 1990s, and this finally closed in January 2008, by which time it had transferred to private ownership after being sold off by the National Coal Board.

These industries have since largely been replaced by service sector industries.

The cities along the M4 corridor are home to a number of high-profile blue-chip companies such as Admiral Insurance, Legal & General and the Welsh-based Principality Building Society. A large number of telephone call centres are located in the region and in particular in the Valleys area. Merthyr Tydfil is home to the principal UK call centre for German mobile telephone company, T-Mobile. Many jobs are also provided in small-scale and family businesses.

One site of note on the M4 corridor is Port Talbot Steelworks – the largest steel producer in the UK and one of the biggest in Europe.

The television and film sectors are fast becoming a major industry in South Wales. In 2021, the Welsh screen sector saw a turnover of £575 million. Prominent film studios have been established in Cardiff (Wolf Studios Wales, Seren Stiwdios, Enfys Studios) as well as Bridgend (Dragon Studios) and Swansea (Bay Studios).

== Railways ==
Great Western Railway operate services from Swansea, Cardiff Central and Newport to London Paddington with Class 800s. Most services in South Wales are operated by Transport for Wales Rail on the South Wales Main Line and associated branches such as the Valley Lines.

== Media ==
Radio stations include:

- Capital South Wales
- Heart South Wales
- Hits Radio South Wales
- Greatest Hits Radio South Wales
- Swansea Bay Radio
- Radio Carmarthenshire
- Radio Pembrokeshire
- Bridge FM
- BBC Radio Wales
- BBC Radio Cymru
- Nation Radio Wales
- Smooth Wales

The Welsh national media is based in Cardiff where the BBC and ITV have their main studios and offices.

== Gallery ==
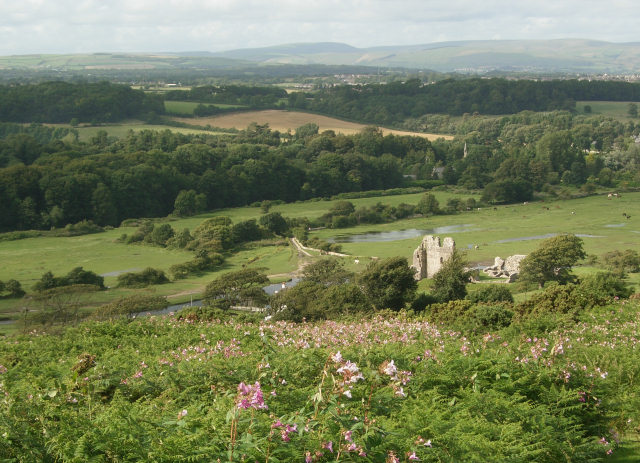
Ogmore Castle and Merthyr Mawr

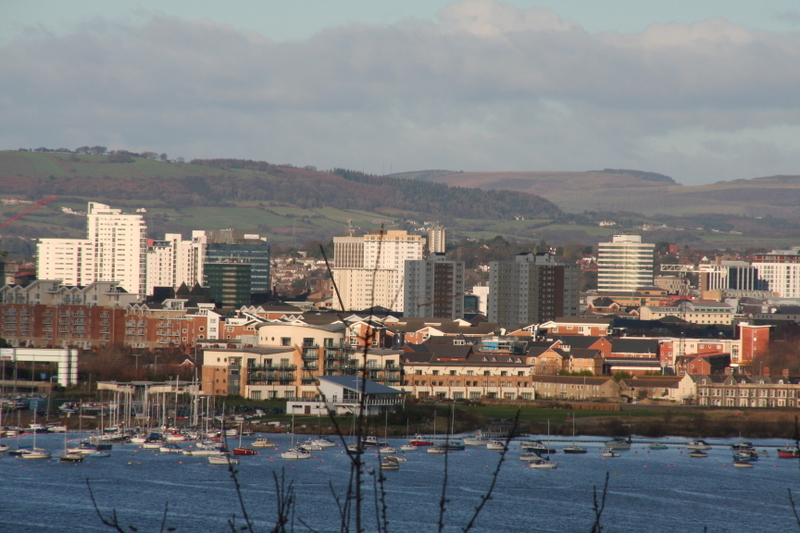
Section of the southeastern Cardiff skyline

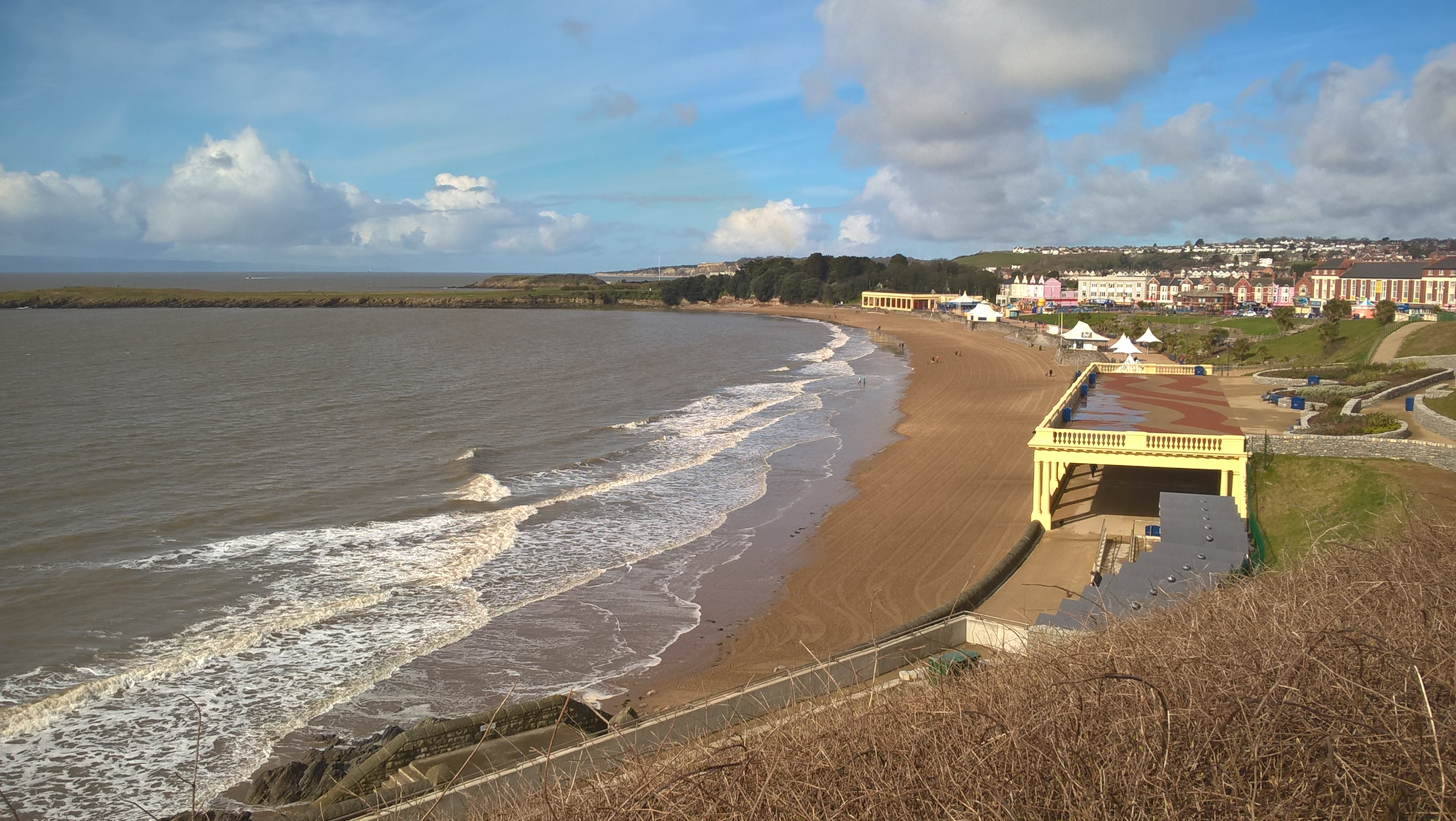
Beach at Barry Island

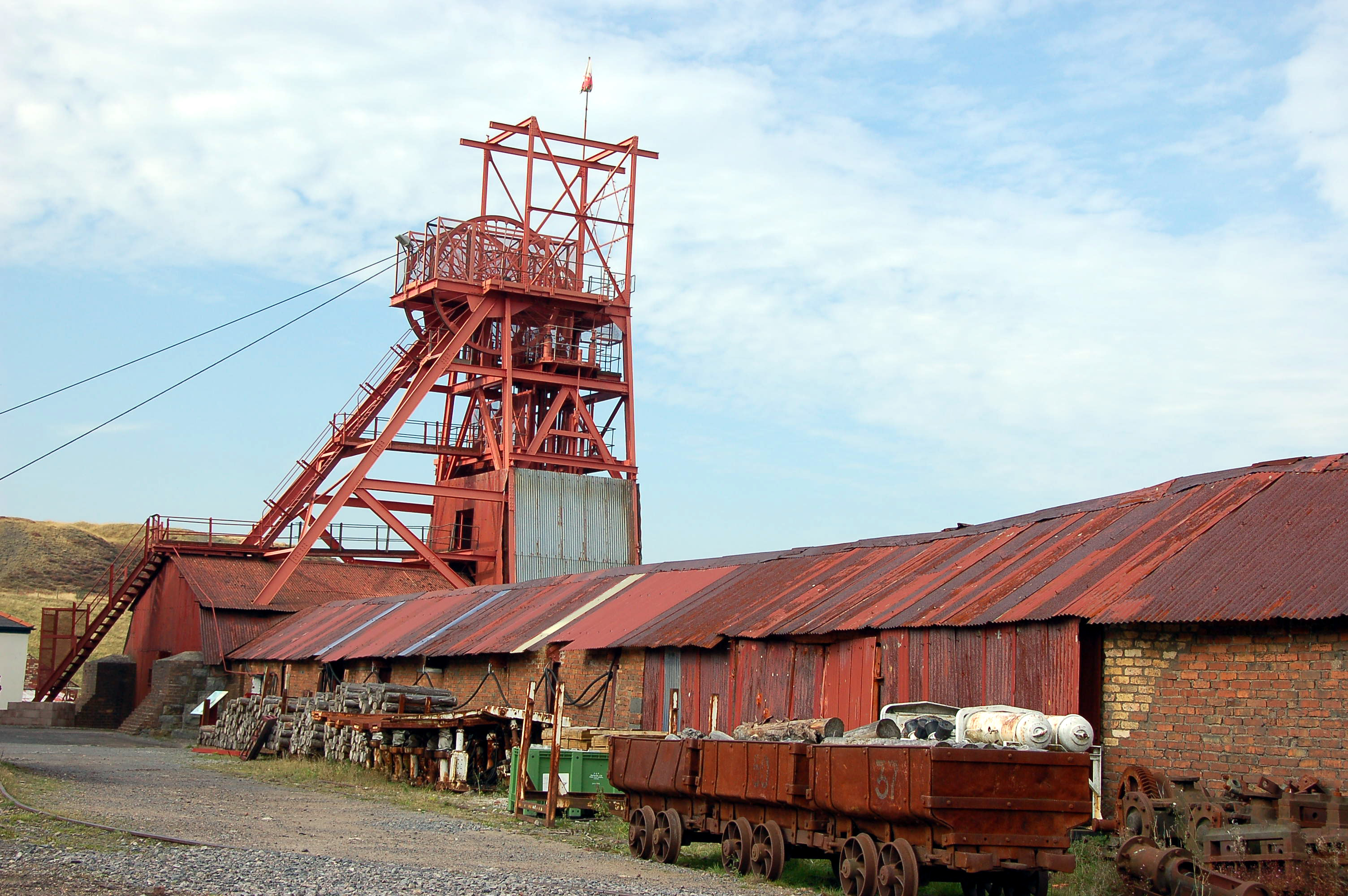
The Big Pit National Coal Museum at Blaenavon – exhibiting economic past

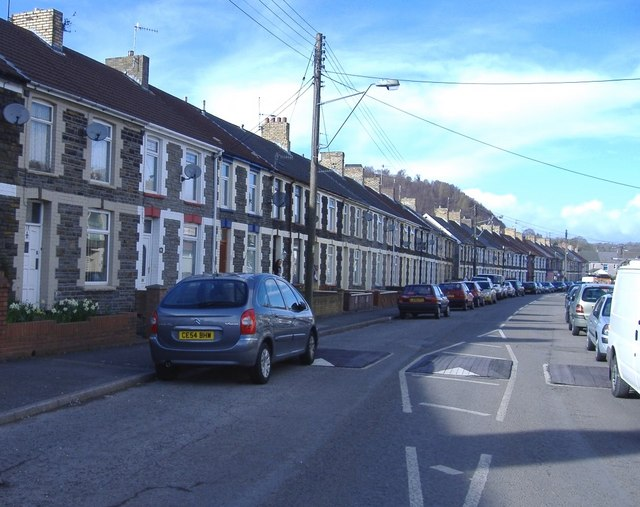
Terraced housing in Llanbradach in the South Wales Valleys

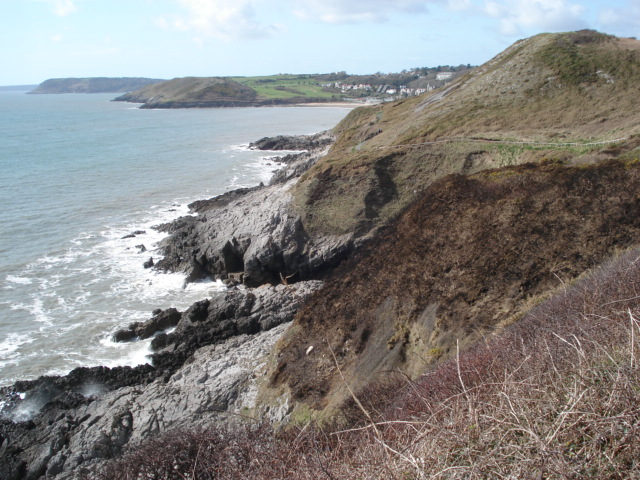
Gower and Swansea Bay Coast Path, part of the Wales Coast Path

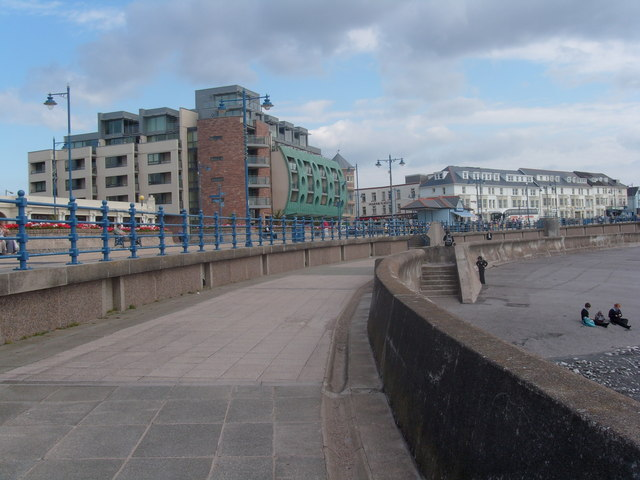
Porthcawl seafront

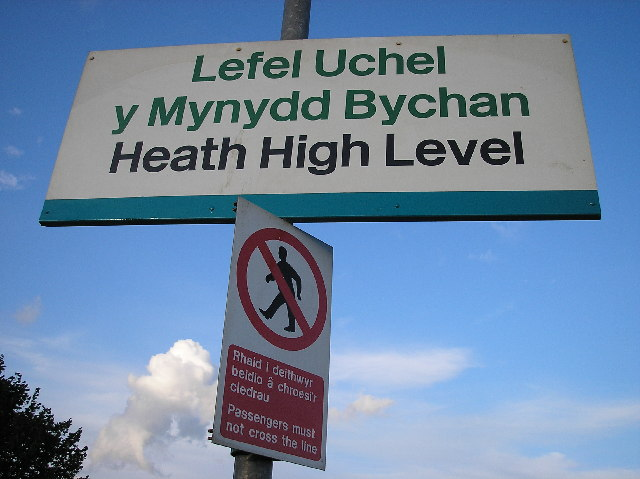
Bilingual signs in Cardiff

== See also ==
- South East Wales
- West Wales
- Mid Wales
- North Wales
- Geography of Wales
- Subdivisions of Wales
- M4 corridor
- South Wales coalfield
- South Wales Valleys
- South Wales Metro
- South Wales Police
- South Wales Police and Crime Commissioner
