= Welsh Factor =

- Company type: Talent Contest
- Industry: Music
- Founded: 2007
- Founder: Anna Marie Thomas and Gareth Thomas
- Headquarters: Neath, Wales
- Number of locations: Wales
- Area served: South Wales
- Products: Music Industry
- Owner: GT Management Promotions / Artiste Management
- Website: welshfactor.com

The Welsh Factor is an inactive talent competition run by entertainment agencies GT Management Promotions (GTMP) and Artiste Management. The competition tours a number of clubs and hotels in South Wales. The show was previously hosted (2010-2017) by radio presenter, Lee Jukes. Lee hosts the afternoon Drivetime show (weekdays 3-7pm) at 106.3 Bridge FM, Swansea Bay Radio, Radio Carmarthenshire and Radio Pembrokeshire. As well as a Saturday show between 10am & 2pm on Nation Radio across the whole of Wales. The Welsh Factor helps aspired singers, dancers and performers to overcome their fears and gain feedback from professionals on the Judging Panel. The judging panel often contains past contestants who can relate to the feelings of the auditionee.

== Notable people ==
=== Contestants ===
- David (Dai) Falkner (contestant on the first series of BBC's The Voice)
- Jay Worley (finalist from the fifth series of Britain's Got Talent)
- John Adams (last 12 boys in the ninth series of The X Factor)

=== Judges ===
- Tony Adkins (Simon Cowell's former bodyguard)
- Tom Richards (Previous contestant who made it to judges houses in the seventh series of The X Factor)
- Phil Davies (Owner of the South Wales Scorpions rugby team)
- Paul Child (Welsh singer and owner of Music Wales record label)
- Lee Jukes (Presenter on 106.3 Bridge FM, 102.1 Swansea Bay Radio), Radio Carmarthenshire, Radio Pembrokeshire and Nation Radio Wales - Head Judge in Maesteg
- Phil Hoyles (Presenter on The Wave 96.4 FM - Swansea)

=== Comperes ===
- Lee Jukes (2010–2017) - 106.3 Bridge FM, 102.1 Swansea Bay Radio, Radio Carmarthenshire, Radio Pembrokeshire, Nation Radio Wales and Sun FM Sunderland presenter
- Helen Enser-Morgan (2010–2011) - 102.1 Bay Radio, 106.3 Bridge FM, 97.1 Radio Carmarthenshire and Swansea Sound presenter
