= Ruth Dodsworth =

British broadcaster, journalist and weather presenter

- Born: Ruth Elizabeth Dodsworth; 21 May 1975 (age 50); Worthing, West Sussex, England
- Education: Cardiff University
- Occupations: Broadcaster, Journalist, Weather presenter
- Years active: 1994–present
- Notable credit: ITV Cymru Wales
- Children: 2

Ruth Elizabeth Dodsworth, OBE (born 21 May 1975) is a British broadcaster, journalist and weather presenter, best known for her work at ITV Cymru Wales.

== Career ==
Dodsworth began her career in radio, working as a researcher for BBC Radio Wales in the mid 1990s.

She joined ITV Cymru Wales (previously HTV Wales) in June 1996, training as a news reporter and presenter. She switched roles to become a weather presenter in 2000.

She has also presented a wide range of local programmes for ITV Cymru Wales, including The Ferret, Grassroots, coverage of the Royal Welsh Show and the Llangollen International Eisteddfod, Wales This Week, A Little Piece of Paradise and the BAFTA-nominated Coast and Country.

Dodsworth is also a relief weather presenter for ITV's English regions, including London and Central, and for ITV National Weather.

In September 2015, Dodsworth joined regional radio station Nation Radio as co-presenter of the station's breakfast show, The Big Welsh Wake Up, alongside Niall Foster.

In November 2016, she began co-presenting a weekday breakfast show for Nation's five local radio stations in south and west Wales – Radio Pembrokeshire, Radio Carmarthenshire, Radio Ceredigion, Swansea Bay Radio and 106.3 Bridge FM. Dodsworth left Nation the following year.

On 5 May 2022, Dodsworth presented the factual documentary Controlled By My Partner? The Hidden Abuse for ITV's peak-time current affairs programme Tonight.

On 1 December 2022, Dodsworth made her debut as a guest weather presenter for Good Morning Britain on ITV Breakfast.

== Personal life ==
Born in Worthing, West Sussex, Dodsworth graduated from university with a degree in communications, before studying postgraduate journalism at Cardiff University through an ITV-sponsored course.

In August 2002, she married businessman Jonathan Wignall, who ran the Escape nightclub in Swansea and an annual dance music festival in the city. They met at the 'Escape into the Park' festival during filming of Dodsworth's HTV Wales series, The Night Before the Morning After, in 2001. Following a miscarriage, the couple had two children before moving from Swansea to Cowbridge in the Vale of Glamorgan in 2010.

Dodsworth left Wignall in October 2019, after he called her over 150 times in a single day, and threatened to take his own life as well as controlling her daily life. The following day, he was arrested on suspicion of harassment. Following his arrest, it later emerged Wignall had planted a tracker device on Dodsworth's car, linked to an app and a laptop computer.

In March 2021, Wignall admitted a charge of coercive and controlling behaviour and stalking against Dodsworth over a nine-year period. Cardiff Crown Court heard Dodsworth had been left "frightened and broken" by his "verbally abusive and physically violent" behaviour. On one occasion, she was pushed by Wignall in front of family members, causing a fractured rib.

He was jailed for three years for coercive and controlling behaviour and 9 months to run concurrently for stalking, and also given a lifetime restraining order against contacting Dodsworth or their children and banned from attending her place of work.

On 19 May 2026, in an interview with Emma Barnett, she described how Wignall controlled her money and he left her "absolutely penniless" and in debt.

== Charity work ==
Dodsworth is an ambassador for Cancer Research Wales.

She also took part in a charity trek across the Sahara desert in early 2016.
