= Brecon transmitting station =

Brecon
- Location within Powys
- Mast height: 46 metres (151 ft)
- Coordinates: 51.949179°N 3.377108°W
- Grid reference: SO054287
- Built: 1970
- Relay of: Wenvoe
- BBC region: BBC Wales
- ITV region: ITV Cymru Wales

The Brecon transmitting station was originally built by the IBA in 1970 as a relay for VHF 405-line analogue television: one of the last 405-line TV stations to be built in Britain. As built, it consisted of a 46 m guyed lattice mast carrying the aerials at the top. This structure was built about 300 m NW of Slwch Tump Iron Age hill fort on the slopes of a 240 m hill known as "The Slwch" overlooking the town. The VHF television feed was provided off-air from Abergavenny, about 25 km to the southeast - itself an off-air relay of St. Hilary near Cardiff.

In 1974 the site was enhanced to transmit UHF analogue colour television. This required a 10 m tall cylindrical weather screen containing the UHF antennas to be fitted on top of the existing mast. The UHF television feed came via a three-hop circuitous route from Wenvoe at Cardiff, via Abergavenny repeater itself repeating the Ebbw Vale repeater which repeated Wenvoe!

The 405-line VHF television service closed across the UK in 1985, but according to the IBA's transmitter list and the BBC's internal "Eng. Inf." magazine, Brecon was due to close early - in the third quarter of 1982.

The station does not radiate VHF FM radio, this comes from a different site at Pencrug Farm a few km to the west.

Currently, the hill's transmitters provide UHF digital terrestrial TV, mostly to the town of Brecon and its immediate environs. The transmission station is owned and operated by Arqiva.

Freeview digital terrestrial TV was not available from this transmitter before the digital switchover process began at Wenvoe, with the first stage taking place on 31 March 2010. The second stage was completed on 27 April 2010.

== Channels listed by frequency ==
=== Analogue television ===
==== 30 April 1970 - 25 January 1974 ====
Brecon transmitter initially provided ITV 405-line VHF television to the upper Usk valley area which is strongly shielded by local hills from both the St. Hilary transmitter just to the west of Cardiff and from the Abergavenny relay transmitter further down the river.

Frequency	VHF	kW	Service
189.75 MHz	8	0.1	HTV Wales

==== 25 January 1974 - Third Quarter 1982 ====
625-line UHF television in colour came to Brecon. This was with the station acting as an indirect off-air relay of Wenvoe.

Frequency	VHF	UHF	kW	Service
189.75 MHz	8	—	0.1	HTV Wales
767.25 MHz	—	58	1	BBC One Wales
791.25 MHz	—	61	1	HTV Wales
815.25 MHz	—	64	1	BBC Two Wales

==== Third Quarter 1982 - 31 March 2010 ====
The 405-line VHF TV service was shut down after a mere 12 years of service. From then onwards TV transmissions were on UHF only. Channel 4 launched across the UK on 1 November 1982. Brecon (being in Wales) transmitted the S4C variant.

Frequency	UHF	kW	Service
735.25 MHz	54	1	S4C
767.25 MHz	58	1	BBC One Wales
791.25 MHz	61	1	ITV1 Wales (HTV Wales until 2002)
815.25 MHz	64	1	BBC Two Wales

=== Analogue and digital television ===
==== 31 March 2010 - 27 April 2010 ====
The UK's digital switchover commenced at Brecon on 31 March 2010. Analogue BBC Two Wales on channel 64 was first to close, and ITV Wales was moved from channel 61 to channel 64 for its last month of service. The new BBC A mux started up in 64-QAM and at full power (i.e. 200 W) on channel 61 which had just been vacated.

Frequency	UHF	kW	Operator	System
735.25 MHz	54	1	S4C	PAL System I
767.25 MHz	58	1	BBC One Wales	PAL System I
794.000 MHz	61	0.2	BBC A	DVB-T
815.25 MHz	64	1	ITV1 Wales	PAL System I

=== Digital television ===
==== 27 April 2010 - 12 March 2013 ====
The remaining three analogue TV services were closed down. Digital multiplexes took over their original frequencies at full power and in 64-QAM encoding mode from the start. Channel 64 was deliberately not reused as part of the Europe-wide tactic of clearing Band V above 800 MHz so as to make space for future 4G mobile phone services.

Frequency	UHF	kW	Operator
738.000 MHz	54	0.2	Digital 3&4
770.000 MHz	58	0.2	BBC B
794.000 MHz	61	0.2	BBC A

==== 13 March 2013 - 14 May 2019 ====
OFCOM announced that channel 61 was also to be cleared to make space for future 4G mobile phone services. At Brecon, BBC A would move to channel 49.

Frequency	UHF	kW	Operator
698.000 MHz	49	0.2	BBC A
738.000 MHz	54	0.2	Digital 3&4
770.000 MHz	58	0.2	BBC B

==== 15 May 2019 to present ====
Due to the 700 MHz Clearance Programme, Brecon now uses the following channels:

Frequency	UHF	kW	Operator
562.000 MHz	32	0.2	BBC A
578.000 MHz	34	0.2	Digital 3&4
586.000 MHz	35	0.2	BBC B
