= Brecon VHF-FM transmitting station =

Transmitting station in Powys, Wales

Brecon VHF FM
- Location within Powys
- Mast height: 15 metres (48 ft)
- Coordinates: 51.959551°N 3.412355°W
- Grid reference: SO030299
- Built: 1966
- Relay of: Wenvoe

The Brecon VHF FM transmitting station in Powys, Wales was originally built by the BBC in 1965 as a relay for VHF FM radio. It consists of a pair of 15 m wooden telegraph poles - one carrying the transmitting antennas, and the other carrying receiving aerials pointed at Wenvoe transmitting station near Cardiff. These stand on land at Pencrug Farm, about 244 m above sea level.

The station does not radiate television, and never did. TV for the area comes from a different site at Brecon transmitting station a few km to the east.

== Channels listed by frequency ==
=== FM Radio ===
==== 20 December 1965 - January 1977 ====
As built, the transmitter re-radiated Wenvoe's three original FM transmissions with horizontal polarisation and with a radiation pattern favouring the town of Brecon.

| Frequency | kW | Service |
|---|---|---|
| 88.9 MHz | 0.01 | BBC Light Programme |
| 91.1 MHz | 0.01 | BBC Third Programme |
| 93.3 MHz | 0.01 | BBC Welsh Home Service |

==== January 1977 - 1989 ====
The launch of Radio Cymru saw the replacement across Wales of the English-language Radio 4 Wales service.

| Frequency | kW | Service |
|---|---|---|
| 88.9 MHz | 0.01 | BBC Radio 1 & 2 |
| 91.1 MHz | 0.01 | BBC Radio 3 |
| 93.3 MHz | 0.01 | BBC Radio Cymru |

==== 1989 - present ====
Bandplan changes allowed more frequencies in Band II, Radio 1 gained its own frequency and National Radio 4 could be transmitted. About this time, the transmitting aerials were changed to the present configuration, radiating a slant-polarisation signal in a fairly omnidirectional pattern using a Lindenblad Array

| Frequency | kW | Service |
|---|---|---|
| 88.9 MHz | 0.01 | BBC Radio 2 |
| 91.1 MHz | 0.01 | BBC Radio Wales |
| 93.3 MHz | 0.01 | BBC Radio Cymru |
| 98.5 MHz | 0.01 | BBC Radio 1 |
| 104.7 MHz | 0.01 | BBC Radio 4 |
