= Llanidloes transmitting station =

Transmitting station in Wales

Llanidloes
- Location within Powys
- Mast height: 23 metres (75 ft)
- Coordinates: 52.447858°N 3.548588°W
- Grid reference: SN947843
- Built: 1966
- Relay of: Long Mountain
- BBC region: BBC Wales
- ITV region: ITV Cymru Wales

The Llanidloes transmitting station is a broadcasting and telecommunications facility consisting of a self-supporting 23 m lattice mast erected on land that is itself about 245 m above sea level about 1 km to the west of the town of Llanidloes in Powys, Wales. It was originally built by the BBC, entering service just before Christmas 1966 transmitting the now-defunct 405-line VHF television system. Transmissions of the original three FM radio services began in February 1967.

Currently, the transmitter provides DVB-T digital television to the area, along with FM radio. With only 2 W ERP, the television broadcasts only cover the town of Llanidloes to the east, the radio broadcasts reach somewhat further east along the Severn valley towards Llandinam.

== Specifications and history ==
As built, the 405-line television and VHF FM radio services came (indirectly) from Wenvoe near Cardiff, and this site was therefore classed as a relay of Wenvoe.

UHF television was added to the site in the late 1970s, launching with just the three programme services that were active at the time. S4C was added in 1982 when it launched. This made Llanidloes a very indirect off-air relay of Blaenplwyf, receiving its signal from Llandinam which relayed Long Mountain. Curiously, Long Mountain was classed as a relay of Blaenplwyf despite being fed from an SHF link from Blaenplwyf via Llangurig Link. A site was normally considered a "relay" only if it picked up its signal off-air.

Across the UK, 405-line television was finally shut down in January 1985. However, Llanidloes was closed early - in the second quarter of 1983.

When digital television was introduced in 2009, the site formally became a relay of Long Mountain which had now become classed as a main transmitter in its own right.

== Services listed by frequency ==
=== Analogue television ===
==== 19 December 1966 - Late 1975 ====
BBC 405-line television started up with the site acting as an off-air relay transmitter of Llandrindod Wells about 25 km to the south.

Frequency	VHF	kW	Service
214.75 MHz	13H	0.014	BBC1 Wales

==== Late 1975 - 1 November 1982 ====
When 625-line colour television was added, the site additionally became an indirect relay of Blaenplwyf about 50 km to the west. The direct line-of-sight to Blaenplwyf is heavily obstructed and so Llanidloes rebroadcast the off-air signal from Llandinam's relay transmitter about 10 km to the east.

Frequency	VHF	UHF	kW	Service
214.75 MHz	13H	—	0.014	BBC1 Wales
479.25 MHz	—	22	0.005	BBC1 Wales
503.25 MHz	—	25	0.005	HTV Wales
527.25 MHz	—	28	0.005	BBC2 Wales

==== 1 November 1982 - Second Quarter 1983 ====
Channel 4 was added to the set transmitted from the site when it launched in November 1982. Being in Wales, Llanidloes radiated the S4C variant.

Frequency	VHF	UHF	kW	Service
214.75 MHz	13H	—	0.014	BBC1 Wales
479.25 MHz	—	22	0.005	BBC1 Wales
503.25 MHz	—	25	0.005	HTV Wales
527.25 MHz	—	28	0.005	BBC2 Wales
559.25 MHz	—	32	0.005	S4C

==== Second Quarter 1983 - 4 November 2009 ====
Llanidloes's Band III transmitter ended its service after 16 years. From then until the start of the digital switchover 26 years later, only UHF television would be available from the site.

Frequency	UHF	kW	Service
479.25 MHz	22	0.005	BBC1 Wales
503.25 MHz	25	0.005	HTV Wales
527.25 MHz	28	0.005	BBC2 Wales
559.25 MHz	32	0.005	S4C

=== Analogue and digital television ===
==== 4 November 2009 - 3 December 2009 ====
Llanidloes's immediate off-air parent was always Llandinam which was an off-air relay of Long Mountain. As part of the digital switchover plan, Long Mountain became a main transmitter in its own right. When the UK's digital switchover commenced at Llanidloes it therefore mirrored the changes taking place at Long Mountain. Analogue BBC Two Wales closed on channel 28 and ITV1 Wales took over on that frequency for what would be its final 3 weeks of service, vacating channel 25 as it did so. The new digital BBC A multiplex started up at full power in 64-QAM mode on channel 25.

Frequency	UHF	kW	Service	System
479.25 MHz	22	0.005	BBC One Wales	PAL System I
506.000 MHz	25	0.002	BBC A	DVB-T
527.25 MHz	28	0.005	ITV1 Wales	PAL System I
559.25 MHz	32	0.005	S4C	PAL System I

=== Digital television ===
==== 3 December 2009 - present ====
All the analogue television services closed and the new digital multiplexes took over their frequencies.

Frequency	UHF	kW	Operator
482.000 MHz	22	0.002	BBC B
506.000 MHz	25	0.002	BBC A
530.000 MHz	28	0.002	Digital 3&4

=== Analogue radio (FM VHF) ===
==== 6 February 1967 - Circa 1990 ====
From the outset, Llanidloes radiated the BBC's three FM radio services, acting as an off-air relay of Llandrindod Wells.

Frequency	kW	Service
88.1 MHz	0.005	BBC Light Programme
90.3 MHz	0.005	BBC Third Programme
92.5 MHz	0.005	BBC Welsh Home Service

==== Present ====
Radio 2, Radio 3 and Radio Cymru still use the original frequencies that have been used since 1967, but Radio 1 launched in 1989 and at some point national Radio 4 was added which, along with Radio Cymru, have replaced the Welsh Home Service (later known as Radio Wales). The transmitters have also been upgraded to deliver 20 W each.

Frequency	kW	Service
88.1 MHz	0.02	BBC Radio 2
90.3 MHz	0.02	BBC Radio Wales
92.5 MHz	0.02	BBC Radio Cymru
97.7 MHz	0.02	BBC Radio 1
104.8 MHz	0.02	BBC Radio 4

== See also ==
- List of masts
- List of radio stations in the United Kingdom
- List of tallest buildings and structures in Great Britain
