= Wales Live =

Wales Live was to be the new provider of regional news on the former HTV Wales version of ITV Wales & West. It is a part of UTV and NWN Media's successful IFNC bid to provide regional news in Wales that was accepted by the Culture Secretary, Ben Bradshaw. The news would be issued across all media, including television, newspaper, radio, and online news applications. The radio stations Swansea Sound and The Wave, were also included in the contract made by the two other companies. The Wales Live provider beat out the opposition of Tinopolis, ITN, and Media Wales to become the preferred provider for the area. The director, Michael Wilson, has stated that he expects the pilot to be running by October 2010.

The Celtic Media Festival is to be sponsored by Wales Live and UTV.

In June 2010, it was scrapped, along with other Pilots in the Border/Tyne Tees regions.
