= Cancer Research Wales =

Welsh cancer research charity

- Ymchwil Canser Cymru (Welsh)
- Founded: 1966
- Founder: Ken Davies
- Type: Charitable organisation
- Registration no.: England and Wales: 1167290
- Purpose: Cancer research; Fundraising
- Headquarters: 22 Neptune Court, Vanguard Way, Cardiff, CF24 5PJ
- Location: Cardiff, Wales
- Coordinates: 51.474380°N 3.1529240°W
- Region served: Wales
- CEO: Adam Fletcher
- Website: https://cancerresearch.wales
- Formerly called: South Wales Cancer Research Council (1966–1990)

Cancer Research Wales (CRW; Welsh: Ymchwil Canser Cymru) is a Welsh independent cancer research charity. Founded in 1966 as the South Wales Cancer Research Council, it has since raised £30 million towards cancer research in Wales. It has 15 retail locations across Wales.

The Cardiff-based charity launched the Brain Tumour Research Initiative (BATRI) in 2024, the first brain tumour research hub in Wales, and organised the country's first brain tumour conference.

It adopted its current name in 1990 to expand its remit from covering only South Wales to cover all of Wales. It further rebranded in 2022, as part of efforts to raise its profile, promote bilingualism, and set it apart from Cancer Research UK which it is unrelated to.

== Organisation and structure ==
It is the only charity in Wales that is dedicated to raising funds for cancer research in Wales. With the charity raising more than £30 million into cancer research in Wales since it was founded. Between 2013 and 2024, £3.2 million of this was given to thirteen projects in North Wales. They also fund a CanSense laboratory at Swansea University, focusing on bowel cancer. It is part of the Wales Cancer Alliance.

It was founded in 1966 by Ken Davies, as the South Wales Cancer Research Council. It later rebranded as Cancer Research Wales in 1990, to support the charity accepting requests for funding research projects across Wales. Their headquarters are at 22 Neptune Court, Vanguard Way in Cardiff, and operate at 15 locations across Wales (as of 2025).

Its research laboratory was based at the Velindre Cancer Centre as of 2010. The charity supports cancer research in both clinical and laboratory settings, partnering with services at universities in Wales, NHS hospitals, and other cancer research academic institutions. Any grants it awards must be "carried out in Wales".

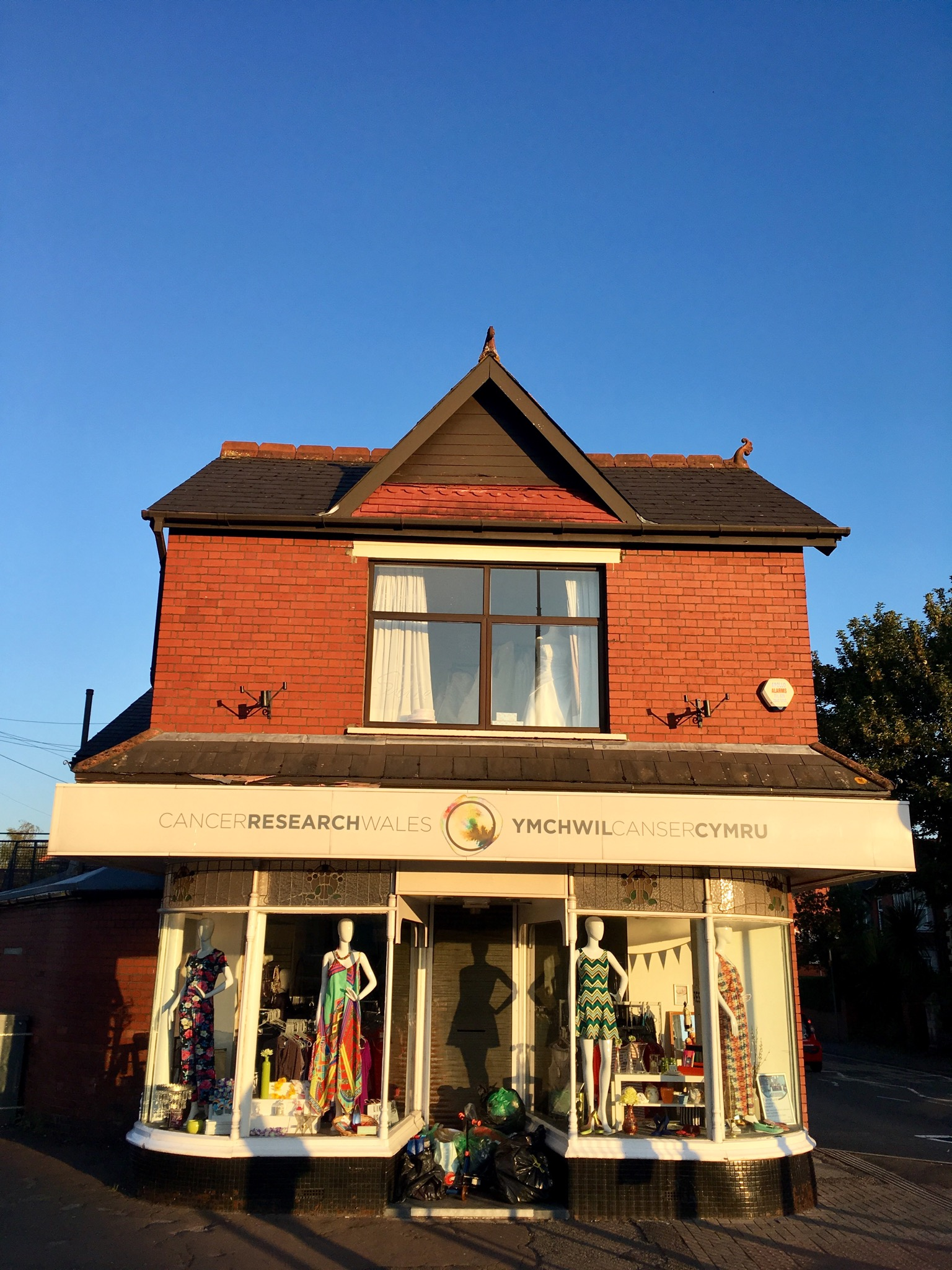
The charity's shop in Whitchurch, Cardiff in 2019

It rebranded in 2022 to include bilingual branding in Welsh and English. The rebranding occurred as following the COVID-19 pandemic in Wales, as the charity wished to boost its profile to increase fundraising to fund more research. The charity also wished to distinguish itself more from Cancer Research UK, which many people were confusing the Welsh charity to be a part of. Its logo is inspired by DNA sequencing gels.

The charity's funding towards projects is mainly centred on four areas of cancer research; discovery and translational research, the early diagnosis of cancer and cancer screening, improving treatments, and research on health systems and outcomes.

== History ==
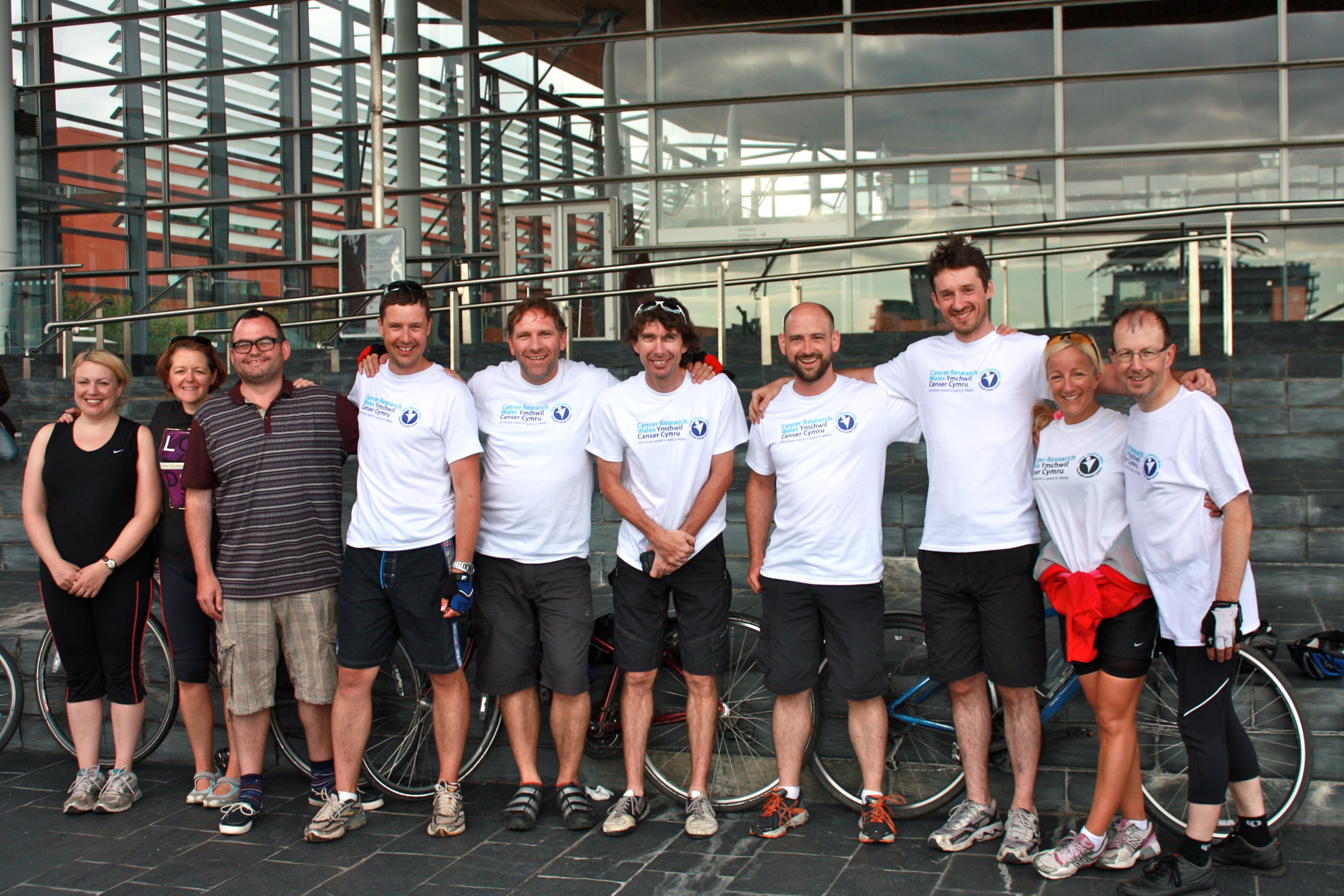
Cyclists in front of the National Assembly for Wales building, now the Senedd building, Cardiff Bay, in 2013, raising money for the charity

It was established in 1966 by Ken Davies, as the South Wales Cancer Research Council. Davies was a consultant radiologist at Velindre Hospital. He became the charity's chairman and then president, overseeing £5 million in research funding, until his death in 2006. Davies' grandson would later sign up to fundraise in 2013 for the charity, but not initially know his grandfather founded the charity.

The charity partly funds the Wales Cancer Bank, set up in 2003. It researches cancer through donated tissue and blood from cancer patients from hospitals across Wales. In 2013, the charity committed a further £1.5 million towards the research bank.

In November 2013, staff of the National Assembly for Wales (now the Senedd or Welsh Parliament) fundraised for the charity and Tŷ Hafan. They completed a 250-mile (400 km) bike ride from the assembly's offices in Colwyn Bay, north Wales, to the Assembly building (now Senedd building) in Cardiff Bay, south Wales. In 2016, to mark the charity's 50th anniversary, fashion designer Julien Macdonald and ITV Cymru Wales weather presenter Ruth Wignall, set on a nine-day 52-mile (84 km) trek across the Sahara to fundraise for the charity.

In 2017, Wales' first stand-alone, not-for-profit bridal boutique was opened to raise money for the charity. The charity already sold wedding dresses from the Bridal Suite shop in Whitchurch, Cardiff since 2011, although launched the Pritchard and Moore bridal boutique in 2017. It was closed during the COVID-19 pandemic in Wales in 2020.

During the COVID-19 pandemic, the charity saw a 50% decrease in income, with its retail income in particular decreasing 83% in 2021, or equivalent to roughly £400,000.

In 2022, it rebranded to include bilingual branding in Welsh and English.

In May 2022, one of the charity's funded projects at Swansea University showed in a trial that a new blood test can pick up around 80% of early stage bowel cancers. By April 2023, the charity invested £1 million into a scheme to improve the knowledge of cancer in the primary care sector. In the same month, Kieran Harris was appointed as its chief executive. This follows an announcement of £2.1 million towards cancer research. In March 2024, Gavin Moore was appointed as chair of its board of trustees.

In April 2024, Cancer Research Wales announced it would set up Wales's first brain tumour research hub, with an annual investment of £1 million. It would be known as the Brain Tumour Research Initiative (BATRI).

In July 2024, Adam Fletcher was appointed as its chief executive officer. By 2024, it had invested £30 million into cancer research projects in Wales. With £3 million in North Wales, and began opening three new shops in North Wales from January 2024. In March 2025, Nicole Quirk was appointed as North Wales fundraising manager.

In January 2025, the charity launched a football-inspired campaign by launching a "Cymru United" team. In February 2025, the charity awarded £462,652 to five research projects across Wales, with Bangor, Cardiff, and Swansea universities receiving funding. In April 2025, the charity's BATRI would fund seven projects, to a total of £1 million, on research for brain tumours. By June 2025, the charity funded four clinical trails, in Cardiff, Swansea and Wrexham.

In September 2025, it launched its "Stripe a Pose" campaign for people to wear stripey clothing on 24 September 2025. In the same month, the charity, as part of BATRI, organised Wales's first brain tumour conference for 19 September, at the Glamorgan Cricket Ground.

In December 2025, the charity stated that applications it received for research funding was larger than the funding it had available. Between 2021 and 2024, applicants had requested a total of £6.6 million, but the charity only could provide £3.6 million, accounting for just over half of all applications and a £3 million shortfall. Per year, it was only able to fund 49% of requests in 2022 and 44% in 2023. In 2025, applications exceeded £6.6 million, but the charity could only provide £2.5 million, accounting for only 37% of applications, with the shortfall increasing to £4.1 million, more than the previous four years combined. CEO Adam Fletcher, urged the public for support to help the charity meet research demand.

== See also ==
- Cancer in the United Kingdom
