= Carmarthen transmitting station =

Carmarthen
- Location within Carmarthenshire
- Tower height: 37 metres (121 ft)
- Coordinates: 51.868075°N 4.30715°W
- Grid reference: SN412213
- Built: 1964/65
- Relay of: Wenvoe
- BBC region: BBC Wales

The Carmarthen transmitting station (Welsh: Gorsaf drosglwyddo Caerfyrddin) was originally built by the BBC in 1964/65 as a relay for VHF radio and television. The site was built on a 135 m ridge to the north of Carmarthen itself, and entered service on 15 March 1965. The transmission station is now owned and operated by Arqiva.

UHF 625-line colour television was never radiated from this site: the main transmitter at Carmel (20 km to the east) provided that service to the town from 1973 when it opened.

The 405-line VHF television service closed across the UK in 1985, but according to the BBC's transmitter list and the BBC's internal "Eng. Inf." magazine, Carmarthen was due to close early - in the first quarter of 1982. From that point onwards the site just relayed FM radio until 6 June 2011 when a single multiplex of DAB radio was added.

== Channels listed by frequency ==
=== Analogue television ===
==== 15 March 1965 - First Quarter 1982 ====
The site provided BBC 405-line VHF television to the towns of Carmarthen and Abergwili which, being sited in a river estuary, could not reliably receive a signal from Wenvoe, 85 km to the east.

Frequency	VHF	kW	Service
45.00 MHz	1	0.013	BBC1 Wales

=== Analogue radio (VHF FM) ===
==== 15 March 1965 - January 1973 ====
According to the BBC's R&D report, the original frequencies for the FM radio services were as shown below.

Frequency	kW	Service
88.5 MHz	0.0065	BBC Light Programme
90.7 MHz	0.0065	BBC Third Programme
92.9 MHz	0.0065	BBC Welsh Home Service

==== January 1973 - May 1978 ====
The three original radio services were still on their original frequencies as late as January 1973, but ERPs had been slightly increased to 10 W per channel by then. By May 1978 all three transmission frequencies had been moved by 400 kHz and all three were transmitting in stereo by that time.

Frequency	kW	Service
88.5 MHz -> 88.9 MHz	0.01	BBC Radio 2
90.7 MHz -> 91.1 MHz	0.01	BBC Radio 3
92.9 MHz -> 93.3 MHz	0.01	BBC Radio 4†

† Radio 4 was replaced by BBC Radio Cymru when it launched in January 1977.

==== May 1978 - Late 1980s ====
The new frequency plan continued unchanged until Radio 1 gained its own frequency.

Frequency	kW	Service
88.9 MHz	0.01	BBC Radio 2
91.1 MHz	0.01	BBC Radio 3
93.3 MHz	0.01	BBC Radio Cymru

==== Late 1980s - present ====
Radio 1 was given its own frequency as more of Band II became available for broadcasting after the bandplan changes of 1988.

Frequency	kW	Service
88.9 MHz	0.01	BBC Radio 2
91.1 MHz	0.01	BBC Radio 3
93.3 MHz	0.01	BBC Radio Cymru
95.5 MHz	0.01	BBC Radio 4
97.5 MHz	0.01	Radio Carmarthenshire
98.5 MHz	0.01	BBC Radio 1
106.0 MHz	0.02	Heart South Wales

=== Digital radio (DAB) ===
==== 6 June 2011 - present ====
Frequency	Block	kW	Operator
225.648 MHz	12B	0.6	BBC National DAB
