= The Ferret (TV series) =

Welsh consumer affairs television programme

The Ferret was a long-running consumer affairs television programme broadcast on ITV Cymru Wales. The programme was first broadcast in 1996 on HTV Wales. It was presented by Chris Segar and Hannah Thomas. Previous presenters include Ruth Wignall, Sarah Hibbard and Juliet Piper.

In 2011 the Ferret held its first Ferret Roadshow, in Pontypridd, to celebrate 15 years of the programme.

The last series aired in 2013 after 376 episodes.
