= Haverfordwest transmitting station =

Broadcasting and telecommunications facility

Haverfordwest
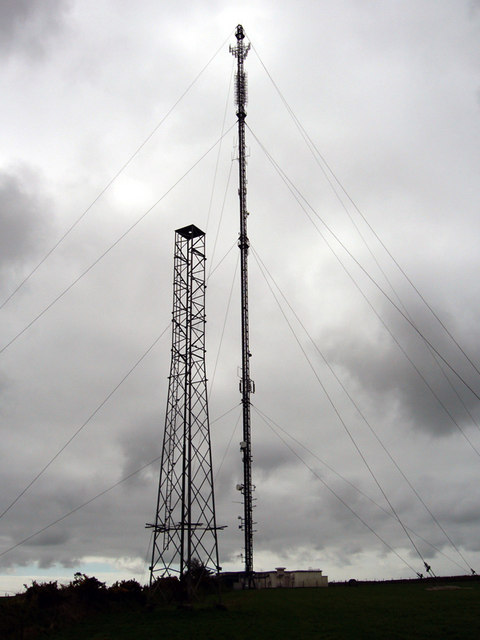

- Mast height: 154.4 metres (507 ft)
- Coordinates: 51°53′57″N 4°51′59″W
- Grid reference: SN028261
- Relay of: Preseli
- BBC region: BBC Wales
- ITV region: ITV Cymru Wales

The Haverfordwest transmitting station is a broadcasting and telecommunications facility located at Woodstock about 13 km (8 mi) to the north east of the town of Haverfordwest, in Pembrokeshire, Wales (grid reference SN028261). It was originally built by the BBC, entering service in early 1964 acting as a main transmitter for the 405-line VHF television system, and as a repeater for Band 2 VHF FM radio received off-air from Blaenplwyf transmitting station. It is now owned and operated by Arqiva.

The site has a 155 m (509 ft) guyed steel lattice mast erected on land that is itself about 187 m (614 ft) above sea level. The radio broadcasts cover the majority of Pembrokeshire, except the north eastern part of the county. The signals also can reach the outskirts of Cardiff and the Vale of Glamorgan.

It currently carries seven analogue FM radio stations, including BBC Radio 1, BBC Radio 2, BBC Radio 3, BBC Radio 4, BBC Radio Cymru, BBC Radio Wales and Radio Pembrokeshire.

When UHF analogue television was added in 1990, those services were provided only at very low power and only designed to cover the small villages of Puncheston, Castlebythe, Little Newcastle and Rosebush, which are all located within about 7 km (4 mi) of the mast.

It currently carries three digital television multiplexes at twice the ERP of the analogue services that they replaced, thus providing digital TV to a much larger area than had been served before.

The mast had its aircraft warning lights upgraded in October 2006, from white xenon discharge flashers to red lamps employing arrays of ultrabright LEDs.

== Services listed by frequency ==
=== Analogue television ===
==== 17 February 1964 - January 1985 ====
Frequency	VHF	kW	Service
61.75 MHz	4	10	BBC1 Wales

==== January 1985 - 18 July 1990 ====
The 405-line VHF television system closed down permanently across the UK, and from then until Summer 1990, the site transmitted no television signals, just VHF (FM) radio.

==== 18 July 1990 - 19 August 2009 ====
Colour TV was added very late: Haverfordwest became a UHF relay of Presely. Being in Wales, this transmitter radiated the S4C variant of Channel 4.

Frequency	UHF	kW	Service	
719.25 MHz	—	52	0.05	BBC1 Wales
751.25 MHz	—	56	0.05	HTV Wales
831.25 MHz	—	66	0.05	BBC2 Wales
847.25 MHz	—	68	0.05	S4C

=== Analogue and digital television ===
==== 19 August 2009 - 16 September 2009 ====
Digital Switchover started at Haverfordwest, mirroring the changes at its parent transmitter at Presely. BBC2 closed on UHF 66 and HTV Wales switched to that channel for its final three weeks of service. The BBC multiplex A started up on UHF 56 vacated by ITV.

Frequency	UHF	kW	Service	System
719.25 MHz	52	0.05	BBC1 Wales	PAL System I
754.000 MHz	56	0.1	BBC A	DVB-T
831.25 MHz	66	0.05	HTV Wales	PAL System I
847.25 MHz	68	0.05	S4C	PAL System I

=== Digital television ===
==== 16 September 2009 - 31 October 2012 ====
All the remaining analogue TV services closed and were replaced with the standard three multiplexes of Freeview Lite. Notice that unusually, the digital TV services are broadcast at twice the ERP that had been provided in the analogue TV days. At most sites, the digital services are broadcast at a fifth the ERP of the old analogue channels.

Frequency	UHF	kW	Operator
690.000 MHz	48	0.1	BBC B
722.000 MHz	52	0.1	Digital 3&4
754.000 MHz	56	0.1	BBC A

==== 31 October 2012 - present ====
As a side-effect of frequency-changes elsewhere in the region to do with clearance of the 800 MHz band for 4G mobile phone use, Haverfordwest's "BBC B" multiplex was moved from channel 48 to channel 47. Additionally, all the transmissions at the site gained a +3 dB power boost.

Frequency	UHF	kW	Operator
682.000 MHz	47	0.2	BBC B
722.000 MHz	52	0.2	Digital 3&4
754.000 MHz	56	0.2	BBC A

=== Analogue radio (FM VHF) ===
Frequency	kW	Service
89.3 MHz	20	BBC Radio 2
91.5 MHz	20	BBC Radio 3
93.7 MHz	20	BBC Radio Cymru
95.9 MHz	20	BBC Radio Wales
98.9 MHz	20	BBC Radio 1
102.5 MHz	20	Radio Pembrokeshire
104.9 MHz	20	BBC Radio 4

== See also ==
- List of masts
- List of radio stations in the United Kingdom
- List of tallest buildings and structures in Great Britain
