= Chris Segar =

Welsh television presenter

- Occupations: TV Presenter, Journalist

Chris Segar is a Welsh television presenter best known for presenting the consumer affairs programme The Ferret from 1996 to 2013.

== Career ==
Chris Segar started his career as a daily newspaper reporter and from 1963 (maybe) worked for Radio Clwyd and BBC Wales before moving to ITV Wales, where he has specialised in presenting current affairs programmes such as Wales This Week and The Ferret. He has also directed and produced documentary programmes.

Segar has also presented Welsh and Wealthy and Segar on Success on ITV1 Wales.

== Personal life ==
Segar is married and has a son, daughter, stepson, and six grandchildren. He lives in Cardiff and also has a home in France.
