= Long Mountain transmitting station =

Transmitter station in Powys, Wales

Long Mountain
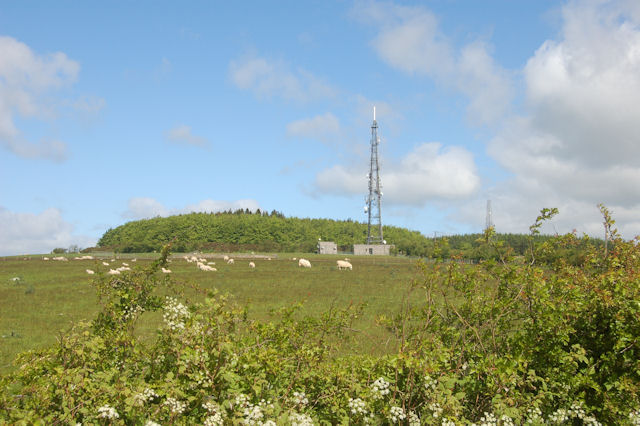

- Location within Powys
- Mast height: 52 metres (171 ft)
- Coordinates: 52.6452°N 3.0865°W
- Grid reference: SJ265058
- Built: 1976
- BBC region: BBC Wales
- ITV region: ITV Cymru Wales

The Long Mountain transmitting station is sited on a 400 metres (1,300 ft) ridge about 4 kilometres (2.5 mi) east of Welshpool in Powys, Mid Wales and has been broadcasting UHF terrestrial TV and VHF FM radio services since the late 1970s. The site has a self-supporting 170' (52 metre) high lattice steel mast and was fed with an SHF link from Blaenplwyf via Llangurig. Despite not taking its signal off-air, it was originally classed as a 625-line UHF TV relay of Blaenplwyf.

The transmitter originally radiated 1 kW providing TV and radio to an area including Newtown and Oswestry. Being only 400 metres (1,300 ft) from the England/Wales border, coverage extended to several towns in England – Shrewsbury included.

Long Mountain became re-classed as main transmitter in its own right (albeit a very low power one) with the advent of digital terrestrial TV from the site on 4 November 2009. In addition to this, it currently transmits FM radio and a single multiplex of DAB Digital radio.

== Services available ==
=== Analogue television ===
==== 17 September 1976 - 1 November 1982 ====
Long Mountain never did broadcast VHF television, and went live with the UK's original three national UHF television services.

Frequency	UHF	kW	Service
767.25 MHz	58	1	BBC1 Wales
791.25 MHz	61	1	HTV Wales
815.25 MHz	64	1	BBC2 Wales

==== 1 November 1982 - 4 November 2009 ====
The UK's fourth national television service joined the set transmitted from the site. Being in Wales, the S4C variant was broadcast.

Frequency	UHF	kW	Service
735.25 MHz	54	1	S4C
767.25 MHz	58	1	BBC1 Wales
791.25 MHz	61	1	HTV Wales
815.25 MHz	64	1	BBC2 Wales

=== Analogue and digital television ===
==== 4 November 2009 - 3 December 2009 ====
The UK's digital switchover commenced at this site. Analogue BBC Two Wales closed on channel 64 and ITV1 Wales took over on that frequency for what would be its final 3 weeks of service, vacating channel 61 as it did so. The new BBC A multiplex started up at full power in 64-QAM mode on channel 60 until 19 October 2011.

Frequency	UHF	kW	Service	System
735.25 MHz	54	1	S4C	PAL System I
767.25 MHz	58	1	BBC One Wales	PAL System I
786.000 MHz	60	0.4	BBC A	DVB-T
815.25 MHz	64	1	ITV1 Wales	PAL System I

=== Digital television ===
==== 3 December 2009 - 19 October 2011 ====
All the analogue television services closed and the new digital multiplexes took over on parking-frequencies (until October 2011) with name-changes, power increases and a shift to 64-QAM. Unusually, for a digital TV site classed as a main transmitter, Long Mountain only radiates the three public service multiplexes of Freeview.

Frequency	UHF	kW	Operator
722.000 MHz	52	0.4	Digital 3&4
754.000 MHz	56	0.4	BBC B
786.000 MHz	60	0.4	BBC A

==== 19 October 2011 - present ====
DSO was completed at The Wrekin, and this allowed the Long Mountain multiplexes to take up their final frequencies.

Frequency	UHF	kW	Operator
594.000 MHz	36	0.4	Digital 3&4
690.000 MHz	48	0.4	BBC B
570.000 MHz	33	0.4	BBC A

=== Analogue radio (VHF FM) ===
For its FM radio services, Long Mountain is an off-air relay of Llangollen.

Frequency	kW	Service
89.6 MHz	0.02	BBC Radio 2
91.8 MHz	0.02	BBC Radio Wales
94.0 MHz	0.02	BBC Radio 4
99.2 MHz	0.02	BBC Radio 1
102.8 MHz	0.02	Heart North and Mid Wales
103.6 MHz	0.02	BBC Radio Cymru

=== Digital radio (DAB) ===
Frequency	Block	kW	Operator
225.648 MHz	12B	1	BBC National DAB
