= Abergavenny transmitting station =

Transmitting station in Wales

Abergavenny
- Location within Monmouthshire
- Mast height: 46 metres (151 ft)
- Coordinates: 51.807362°N 3.097191°W
- Grid reference: SO244126
- Built: 1969
- Relay of: Wenvoe
- BBC region: BBC Wales
- ITV region: ITV Cymru Wales

The Abergavenny transmitting station was originally built by the IBA in 1969 as a relay for BBC and ITV VHF 405-line analogue television. It consists of a 46 m guyed lattice mast carrying the aerials at the top. This structure was built on a 440 m hill known as Gilwern Hill overlooking the towns of Gilwern and Abergavenny in Monmouthshire, South Wales. The band III VHF television feeds were provided off-air from St. Hilary and Wenvoe, both near Cardiff.

In 1973 the site was enhanced to transmit UHF analogue colour television. The UHF television feed came via a two-hop route from Wenvoe, via the Ebbw Vale repeater.

The 405-line VHF television service closed across the UK in 1985, but according to the BBC's and IBA's transmitter list and the BBC's internal "Eng. Inf." magazine, Abergavenny was due to close early - in the third quarter of 1982.

Currently, the hill's transmitters provide UHF digital terrestrial TV, VHF FM radio and DAB digital radio. The transmission station is currently owned and operated by Arqiva.

Freeview digital terrestrial TV was not available from this transmitter before the digital switchover process began at Wenvoe, with the first stage taking place on 31 March 2010. The second stage was completed on 27 April 2010.

== Channels listed by frequency ==
=== Analogue television ===
==== 23 April 1969 - 28 September 1973 ====
Abergavenny transmitter initially provided BBC and ITV 405-line VHF television to the mid Usk valley area which is strongly shielded by local hills from both the Wenvoe transmitter and the St. Hilary transmitter.

Frequency	VHF	kW	Service
56.75 MHz	3H	0.03	BBC One Wales
204.75 MHz	11H	0.1	HTV Wales

==== 28 September 1973 - Third Quarter 1982 ====
625-line UHF television in colour came to Abergavenny. This was with the station acting as an indirect off-air relay of Wenvoe.

Frequency	VHF	UHF	kW	Service
56.75 MHz	3H	—	0.03	BBC One Wales
204.75 MHz	11H	—	0.1	HTV Wales
615.25 MHz	—	39	1	BBC One Wales
663.25 MHz	—	45	1	BBC Two Wales
695.25 MHz	—	49	1	HTV Wales

==== Third Quarter 1982 - 31 March 2010 ====
The 405-line VHF TV services were shut down after 15 years. From then onwards TV transmissions were on UHF only. Channel 4 launched across the UK on 1 November 1982. Abergavenny (being in Wales) transmitted the S4C variant.

Frequency	UHF	kW	Service
615.25 MHz	39	1	BBC One Wales
639.25 MHz	42	1	S4C
663.25 MHz	45	1	BBC Two Wales
695.25 MHz	49	1	ITV1 Wales (HTV Wales until 2002)

=== Analogue and digital television ===
==== 31 March 2010 - 27 April 2010 ====
The UK's digital switchover commenced at Abergavenny on 31 March 2010. Analogue BBC Two Wales on channel 45 was first to close, and ITV Wales was moved from channel 49 to channel 45 for its last month of service. The new BBC A mux started up in 64-QAM and at full power (i.e. 200 W) on channel 49 which had just been vacated.

Frequency	UHF	kW	Operator	System
615.25 MHz	39	1	BBC One Wales	PAL System I
639.25 MHz	42	1	S4C	PAL System I
663.25 MHz	45	1	ITV1 Wales	PAL System I
698.000 MHz	49	0.2	BBC A	DVB-T

=== Digital television ===
==== 27 April 2010 - present day ====
The remaining three analogue TV services were closed down. Digital multiplexes took over their original frequencies at full power and in 64-QAM encoding mode from the start.

Frequency	UHF	kW	Operator
642.000 MHz	42	0.2	Digital 3&4
666.000 MHz	45	0.2	BBC B
698.000 MHz	49	0.2	BBC A

==== 13 March 2013 ====
As a side-effect of frequency-changes elsewhere in the region to do with clearance of the 800 MHz band for 4G mobile phone use, Abergavenny's "BBC A" multiplex will have to be moved from channel 49 to channel 39..

Frequency	UHF	kW	Operator
618.000 MHz	39	0.2	BBC A
642.000 MHz	42	0.2	Digital 3&4
666.000 MHz	45	0.2	BBC B

=== Analogue radio (VHF FM) ===
==== Present ====
Frequency	kW	Service
88.7 MHz	0.02	BBC Radio 2
90.9 MHz	0.02	BBC Radio 3
93.1 MHz	0.02	BBC Radio 4
95.2 MHz	0.02	BBC Radio Wales
98.3 MHz	0.02	BBC Radio 1
103.5 MHz	0.02	BBC Radio Cymru
105.2 MHz	0.02	Heart South Wales
107.8 MHz	0.02	Sunshine Radio

=== Digital radio (DAB) ===
==== 6 June 2011 - present ====
Frequency	Block	kW	Operator
0.0 MHz	0A	0.0	BBC National DAB
0.0 MHz	0A	0.0	MXR Severn Estuary
