= Swansea Bay Radio =

Local radio station in Swansea Bay, Wales

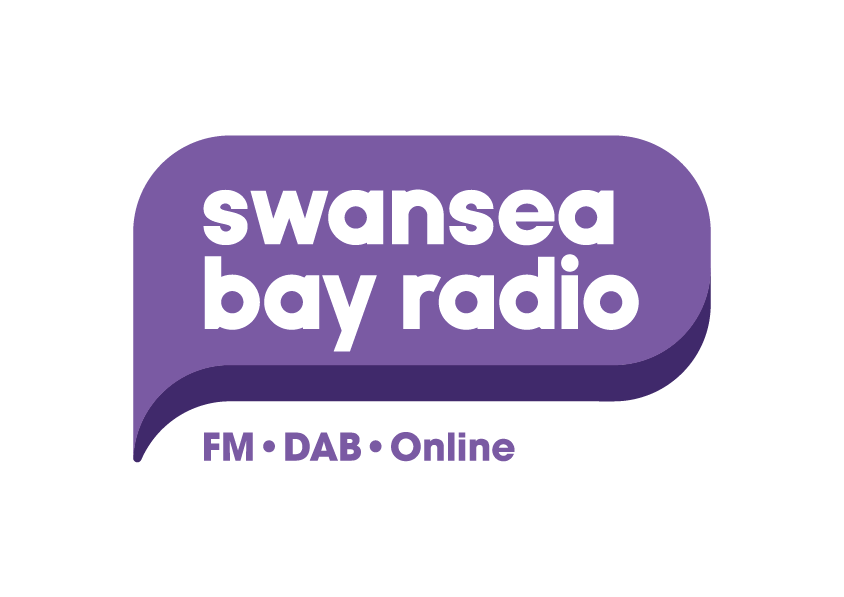
- Swansea; United Kingdom
- Broadcast area: Swansea, Neath Port Talbot and South Carmarthenshire
- Frequencies: FM: 102.1 MHz; DAB: 12D
- RDS: Swansea

Programming
- Format: AC

Ownership
- Owner: Nation Broadcasting

History
- First air date: 5 November 2006
- Former names: Swansea Bay Radio; Nation 80s Nation Hits; Bay Radio; Swansea Bay Radio; Breezy Radio; Easy Radio

Technical information
- Transmitter coordinates: 51.6292°N 3.9202°W

Links
- Website: Swansea Bay Radio

Swansea Bay Radio is an Independent Local Radio station that broadcasts to Swansea, Neath Port Talbot and South Carmarthenshire. It is owned and operated by Nation Broadcasting and broadcasts on 102.1 FM and DAB from studios near the St Hilary transmitter in the Vale of Glamorgan.

The station plays easy listening pop music from the past and present, alongside local news, travel and community information.

As of December 2023, the station broadcasts to a weekly audience of 16,000, according to RAJAR.

== History ==
Swansea Bay Radio launched on 5 November 2006 from studios in Neath, with a soft Adult Contemporary and easy listening music format, before switching to playing only 1980s music in March 2012. The station was rebranded as Nation 80s on 1 June 2012, and on 16 January 2013, rebranded again as Nation Hits. On 1 March 2016, the station reverted to its original name of Swansea Bay Radio.

Nation 80s (since 2020) and Nation Hits (since 2021) have since been revived by Nation Broadcasting as digital radio stations - part of a series of digital-first services operated on DAB in various locations and online; whilst Nation 80s follows much the same concept as it did in Swansea, the newer Nation Hits is a contemporary hit radio service, rather than the classic-hits format of the earlier incarnation. As of 2022, both these stations are transmitted on the Mid & West Wales DAB multiplex, with Nation Hits having replaced Nation Radio UK on the multiplex in December 2021.

On 21 April 2022, the station relaunched as Breezy Radio, with its own dedicated easy listening playlist and schedule, and ceased sharing programmes with Nation's network of local stations. In addition to taking over from Swansea Bay Radio on FM and on DAB in mid & West Wales, the new station was also added to the South-East Wales and North-East Wales/West Cheshire DAB multiplexes.

A version of the station for broadcast outside Wales, Breezy Radio UK was launched in late June 2022 - officially the 27th, though online streaming began several days prior - as a DAB+ station in London and Birmingham, and online. It was initially announced that the new Breezy station would also serve the south of England - including the areas served by the Nation-run Hits Radio South Coast and Greatest Hits Radio South Coast; however, this plan was subsequently amended, with Nation Radio UK taking the slot instead.

On 1 September 2022, Easy Radio and Easy Radio UK were launched in place of the two previous Breezy channels and DAB coverage to other parts of the UK was also increased. Meanwhile, Easy Radio expanded further on FM in Hampshire on 19 September 2022, taking over the frequencies previously used by Hits Radio South Coast, with a localised service featuring news/weather/travel for the region.

On 12 February 2024, Nation Broadcasting announced that Swansea Bay Radio would be once again returning replacing Easy Radio, in response to Bauer Radio announcing the rebrand of rival station The Wave to Hits Radio South Wales. The rebrand took place at midnight on 1st March 2024.

== Programming ==
As with Nation's other stations, output is produced and broadcast from the remote studios of Nation Broadcasting's presenters.

On 9 June 2025, following the removal of the last remaining local programmes on Hits Radio South Wales in favour of a networked breakfast show, Swansea Bay Radio reintroduced local programming specific to Swansea, splitting from the schedules followed by its sister stations Bridge FM, Radio Carmarthenshire and Radio Pembrokeshire. In 2026, Swansea Bay Radio reverted to sharing programming with its sister stations. Hits Radio South Wales local breakfast hosts Leigh Jones and Claire Scott moved their show to Swansea Bay Radio after their final broadcast on Hits Radio South Wales. Jones and Scott join fellow former The Wave/Hits Radio South Wales presenters Phil Hoyles, Siany Martin and Steven 'Wiggy' Wiggins at the station.

Presenter-led shows air from 6am to midnight seven days a week.

=== News ===
Local news bulletins air hourly from 6am - 7pm on weekdays and 8am - 1pm at weekends, produced in-house by the Nation Network News service.

National news bulletins from Sky News Radio air hourly at other times.

As Swansea Bay Radio, the station previously applied unsuccessfully to Ofcom to remove the requirement for a 24-hour news obligation.
