= Radio Pembrokeshire =

Independent local radio station that broadcasts to Pembrokeshire

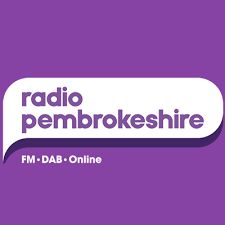
- Narberth, Pembrokeshire; United Kingdom
- Broadcast area: Pembrokeshire
- Frequencies: FM: 102.5 MHz; 107.5 MHz (Fishguard and Tenby); DAB: 12D

Programming
- Format: AC

Ownership
- Owner: Nation Broadcasting

History
- First air date: 14 July 2002

Technical information
- Transmitter coordinates: 51.8992°N 4.8665°W

Links
- Website: Radio Pembrokeshire

Radio Pembrokeshire is an Independent Local Radio station that broadcasts to Pembrokeshire. It is owned and operated by Nation Broadcasting and broadcasts on 102.5 and 107.5 FM and DAB from studios near the St Hilary transmitter in the Vale of Glamorgan.

The station plays chart music from the 1980s to the present day, alongside local news, travel and community information.

As of June 2024, the station broadcasts to a weekly audience of 24,000, according to RAJAR.

== History ==
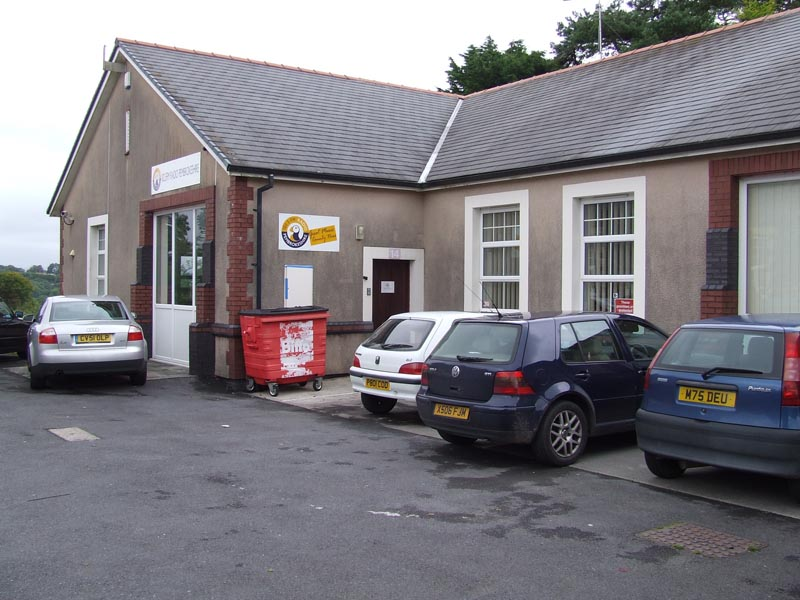
The original studios of Radio Pembrokeshire were at the Old School Estate in Narberth

Radio Pembrokeshire was founded by Keri Jones and Stephen Cole as Haven FM, a restricted service licence (RSL) station which carried out a 30-day trial broadcast to the Pembroke, Pembroke Dock and Neyland areas during the summer of 1999. Based at a small studio at Bethany Chapel, the station returned for a further trial period in November and December 1999 – and encouraged listeners to lobby the Radio Authority to license a permanent local radio station.

Two further RSL broadcasts took place in 2000 – by the end of the year, Haven FM launched its bid to secure a countywide licence for the whole of Pembrokeshire. Two further groups, More FM and Real Radio, also applied for the licence. In November 2001, Haven FM was awarded an eight-year licence.

The station was renamed Radio Pembrokeshire following a pre-launch competition to find a new station name. Originally intended to broadcast from studios in Haverfordwest, a lack of suitable premises led to the station setting up studios at the Old School Estate in Narberth, around nine miles to the east of Haverfordwest and near the border with neighbouring Carmarthenshire.

Radio Pembrokeshire began broadcasting on Sunday 14 July 2002, broadcasting on 102.5 FM from the Haverfordwest transmitter near Woodstock with low power relay stations in Fishguard and Tenby, broadcasting on 107.5 FM.

Nearly two years after the launch of Radio Pembrokeshire, the station's Narberth studios became home to a second local station, Radio Carmarthenshire, followed in March 2010 by Radio Ceredigion. In August 2006, the station was sold to Town and Country Broadcasting (now Nation Broadcasting).

In September 2016, Nation Broadcasting announced plans to relocate Radio Pembrokeshire and its two neighbouring counties services from the Narberth studios to studios near the St Hilary transmitter on the outskirts of Cowbridge. The station switched broadcasting to the St Hilary studios at 10 am on Tuesday 22 November 2016.

== Programming ==
The majority of Radio Pembrokeshire's output is produced and broadcast from Nation Broadcasting's St Hilary studios. Most programming and presenters are shared with sister stations Swansea Bay Radio, Radio Carmarthenshire and Bridge FM. Local programming for Pembrokeshire can now be heard on Pure West Radio, a community radio station which broadcasts from studios in Haverfordwest on DAB and online.

Presenter-led shows air from 6 am to 7 pm on weekdays, 8 am to 6 pm on Saturdays and 6 am to 10 pm on Sundays. A weekly hour-long Welsh language music programme on Sunday evenings, shared with Radio Carmarthenshire.

=== News ===
Local news bulletins air hourly from 6am – 7pm on weekdays and 7am – 1pm at weekends with headlines on the half-hour during weekday breakfast and drivetime.

National news bulletins from Sky News Radio air hourly at other times.
