= Wenvoe transmitting station =

Transmission station in Wales

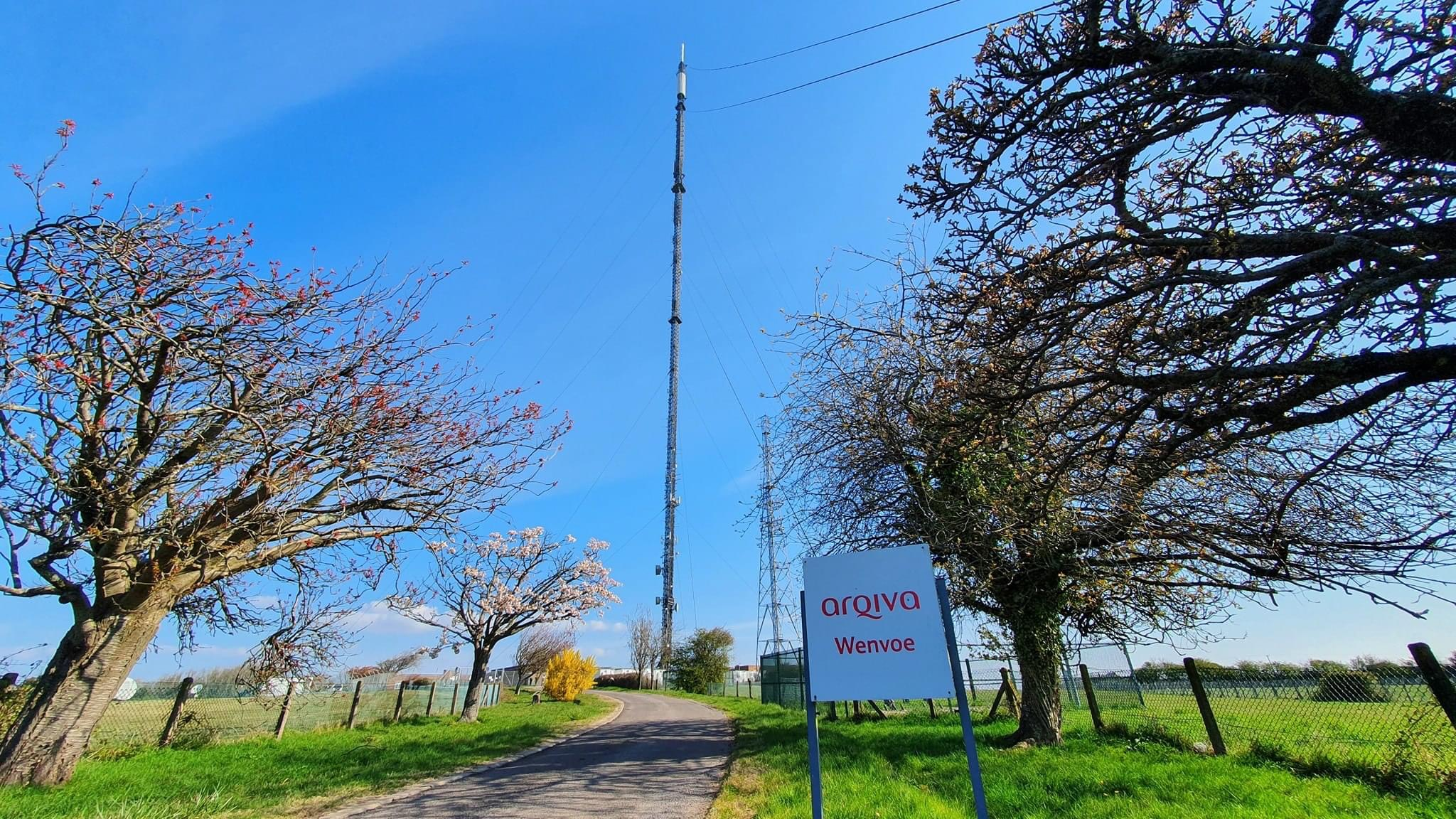
- Wenvoe mast

- Location within Vale of Glamorgan
- Mast height: 260.7 metres (855 ft)
- Coordinates: 51.459167°N 3.281667°W
- Grid reference: ST110742
- Built: 1985
- BBC region: BBC Wales
- ITV region: ITV Cymru Wales
- Local TV service: Cardiff TV

The Wenvoe transmitting station, officially known as Arqiva Wenvoe, is the main facility for broadcasting and telecommunications for Cardiff and South Wales. It is situated close to the village of Wenvoe in the Vale of Glamorgan, Wales, in the UK.

It comprises a 260.7-metre (855 ft) guyed mast with antennas attached at various heights. The average height above sea level is 384 metres (1,260 ft) for the television antennas.

It is owned and operated by Arqiva. The site serves an estimated 1.5m listeners (0.63m households) in the South West of England, and 1.3m listeners (0.54m households) in Wales.

== History ==
The original 230 m (750 ft) mast at the site was built in 1952 by the BBC to provide 405-line VHF television to south Wales and the west of England. The station broadcast on Band I channel 5 (66.75 MHz) from 15 August 1952 using its reserve transmitters, and from 20 December 1952 with its main high-power transmitters. It remained on air until the closure of 405-line television in 1985.

In 1955 VHF FM radio was added to the mast, carrying the BBC's Home Service. This was followed by the addition of the Light Programme in 1956 and the Third Programme in 1959.

In 1963 a second 191 m (625 ft) mast was built alongside the existing structure. This was in order to carry the new BBC Wales 405-line TV service on Band III VHF channel 13 (214.75 MHz), and entered service on 9 February 1964. The 405-line transmitter for this service was closed early, in 1983.

On 12 September 1965, a 625-line black and white television service BBC2 became available from Wenvoe on UHF. This new transmitter was capable of colour broadcasting from the start and was used for unannounced colour TV engineering test-transmissions from that point onwards.

In September 1967 BBC2 officially launched a colour TV service from Wenvoe, a few months after BBC2 Crystal Palace and others had launched the UK's first colour broadcasting in July of that year.

In 1970 UHF 625-line colour television was introduced for BBC1 and ITV Wales (HTV Wales. S4C was added later when it launched in 1982.

In 1985, when 405-line TV closed, the site was re-engineered and both of the existing masts were taken down. They were replaced by a brand new mast (to be known as Wenvoe "A"), which is the structure currently in place at the site. Wenvoe "B" is a self-supporting telecommunications mast nearby. The VHF FM antennas were upgraded from the old horizontally polarised slot antennas to new mixed polarisation antennas, and the transmitter power was doubled.

The new analogue Channel 5 was launched in 1997, but this was never transmitted from Wenvoe. It was presumably thought that the 125 kW transmitter at Mendip would serve a satisfactory number of homes in Wenvoe's service area. At the time, many homes within range of Mendip already had aerials pointing at it so as to receive the English-only Channel 4 rather than the bilingual English/Welsh S4C transmitted from Wenvoe.

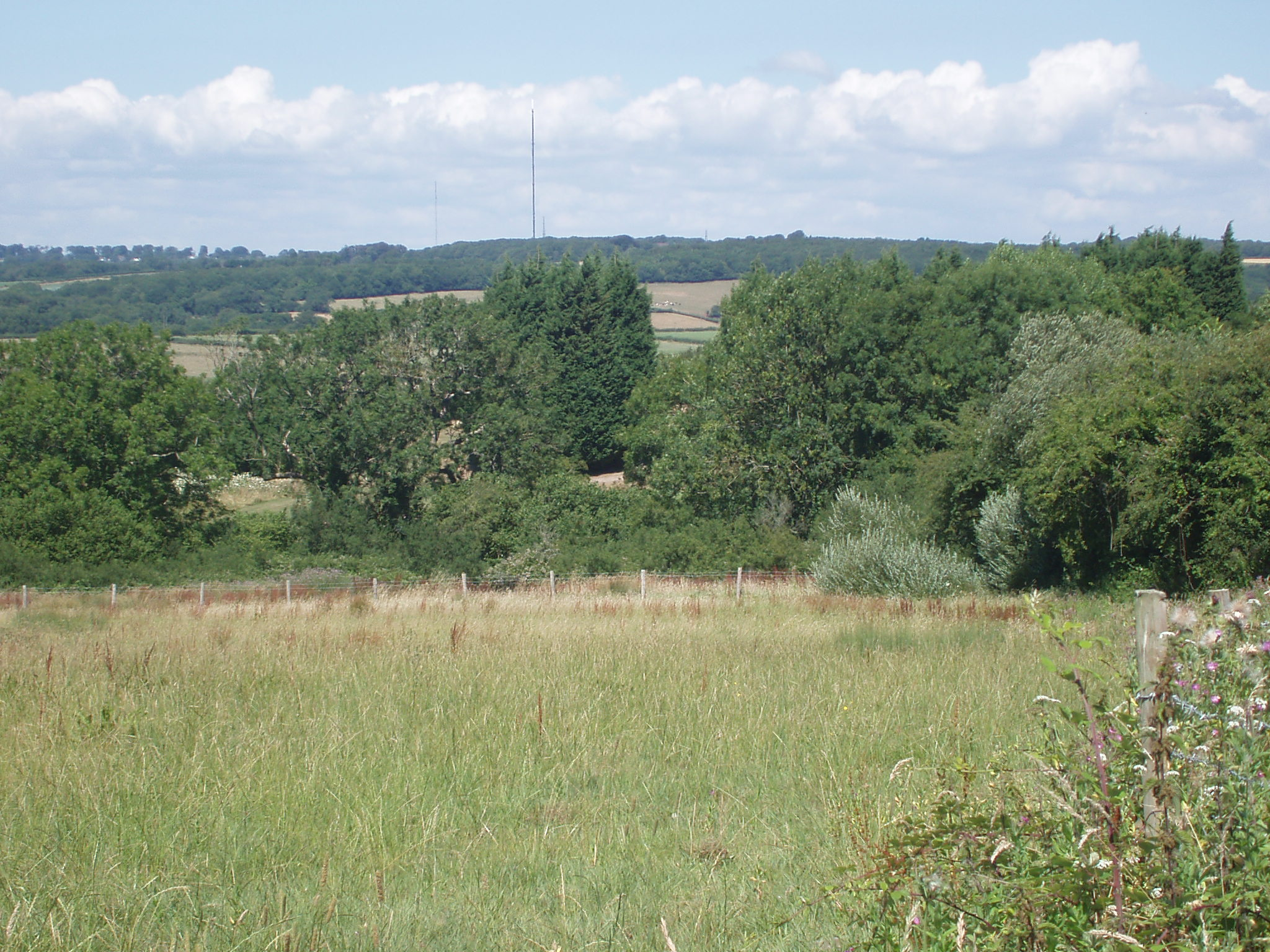
The mast seen in the distance from Barry

Work began on a new temporary 217.7 m (714 ft) stayed mast (Wenvoe "C") on 14 June 2006 and it was completed in September 2006. This carried the analogue signals whilst Wenvoe "A" was to be structurally improved and extended by 23 metres (75 ft). Wenvoe "A" was fitted with a new high-power digital antenna and a full reserve antenna. New high-power digital TV transmitters were installed in the buildings, which would allow Wenvoe "A" to broadcast all six main digital TV multiplexes, as well as a seventh currently proposed by OFCOM after the analogue signals were switched off in 2010.

This mechanical upgrade was completed by the summer of 2009 and Wenvoe "C" was dismantled starting in late August 2009.

Wenvoe's analogue BBC Two service was switched off on 3 March 2010 and the remaining analogue TV services were switched off on 31 March 2010. At this point, Wales had officially completed its switchover to digital TV services.

BBC Radio Wales commenced broadcasting from the Wenvoe Transmitter on 6 December 2011 at 10:39. This replaced the low power VHF Transmitter on the Wenallt Hill which also carried BBC Wales VHF programme on 103.9 MHz to South East Wales up to that point.

== Services listed by frequency ==
=== Analogue television ===
==== 15 August 1952 - 9 February 1964 ====
Frequency	VHF	kW	Service
66.75 MHz	5V	100	BBC Television

==== 9 February 1964 - 12 September 1965 ====
The second mast came into service carrying the BBC Wales service.

Frequency	VHF	kW	Service
66.75 MHz	5V	100	BBC1 West
214.75 MHz	13V	200	BBC1 Wales

==== 12 September 1965 - April 1970 ====
The first UHF 625-line television service started from Wenvoe. This required the installation of a Band V antenna at the top of the mast, replacing the 1952 Band I antenna that had originally been sited there. The new Band I antenna was brought into service on 8 December 1964, and was sited immediately below the Band V antenna and above the Band II antenna. This put it in close proximity with the fixings of the top deck of guy wires, requiring some careful engineering so as not to affect the radiation pattern adversely.

Frequency	VHF	UHF	kW	Service
66.75 MHz	5V	—	100	BBC1 West
214.75 MHz	13V	—	200	BBC1 Wales
711.25 MHz	—	51	500	BBC2 Wales†

† Monochrome initially, colour TV service started September 1967.

==== April 1970 - 1 November 1982 ====
BBC1 & HTV Wales launched on 625 line tv from Wenvoe

Frequency	VHF	UHF	kW	Service
66.75 MHz	5V	—	100	BBC1 West
214.75 MHz	13V	—	200	BBC1 Wales
631.25 MHz	—	41	500	HTV Wales
655.25 MHz	—	44	500	BBC1 Wales†
711.25 MHz	—	51	500	BBC2 Wales

† Monochrome initially, colour production at BBC One Wales started 9 July 1970.

==== 1 November 1982 - 4 January 1983 ====
Channel Four launched across the UK. Being in Wales, Wenvoe instead transmitted S4C.

Frequency	VHF	UHF	kW	Service
66.75 MHz	5V	—	100	BBC1 West
214.75 MHz	13V	—	200	BBC1 Wales
631.25 MHz	—	41	500	HTV Wales
655.25 MHz	—	44	500	BBC1 Wales
679.25 MHz	—	47	500	S4C
711.25 MHz	—	51	500	BBC2 Wales

==== 4 January 1983 - 3 January 1985 ====
The 405-line BBC1 Wales service on Band III from Wenvoe was discontinued early. The off-air 405-line relays at Abergavenny, Carmarthen and Llanelli had been decommissioned the previous year. This left Llandrindod Wells (and Wenvoe's indirect off-air relay at Llanidloes) and Kilvey Hill as the last surviving 405-line BBC Wales transmitters classed as relays of Wenvoe.

405-line transmissions from Kilvey Hill and Llanidloes were due to shut in the second quarter of 1983, leaving Llandrindod Wells to continue alone until January 1985.

Frequency	VHF	UHF	kW	Service
66.75 MHz	5V	—	100	BBC1 West
631.25 MHz	—	41	500	HTV Wales
655.25 MHz	—	44	500	BBC1 Wales
679.25 MHz	—	47	500	S4C
711.25 MHz	—	51	500	BBC2 Wales

==== 3 January 1985 - 15 November 1998 ====
The 405-line VHF television system was shut down across the whole UK, and until the start of digital television services, Wenvoe's TV output was 625-lines on UHF only.

Frequency	UHF	kW	Service
631.25 MHz	41	500	HTV Wales
655.25 MHz	44	500	BBC1 Wales
679.25 MHz	47	500	S4C
711.25 MHz	51	500	BBC2 Wales

=== Analogue and digital television ===
==== 15 November 1998 - 3 March 2010 ====
This was the initial roll-out for digital television using the DVB-T system. The transmitter frequencies and power outputs were chosen not to interfere with the UHF TV channels, but to be received with the same aerial-group. The QAM constellations and number of carriers were changed around 2002 after the collapse of ITV Digital as the service was taken over by the Freeview consortium.

Frequency	UHF	kW	Service	System
546.000 MHz	30	10	BBC (Mux 1)	DVB-T
578.000 MHz	34	5	Digital 3&4 (Mux 2)	DVB-T
625.833 MHz	40-	5	SDN (Mux A)	DVB-T
631.25 MHz	41	500	HTV Wales	PAL System I
649.833 MHz	43-	5	Arqiva (Mux C)	DVB-T
655.25 MHz	44	500	BBC1 Wales	PAL System I
673.833 MHz	46-	5	Arqiva (Mux D)	DVB-T
679.25 MHz	47	500	S4C	PAL System I
705.833 MHz	50-	5	BBC (Mux B)	DVB-T
711.25 MHz	51	500	BBC2 Wales	PAL System I

==== 3 March 2010 – 31 March 2010 ====
Analogue BBC Two Wales on channel 51 closed after 45 years of service, and HTV Wales was moved from channel 41 to that channel for what would be its final month of service.

Multiplex 1 from channel 30 was renamed BBC A and moved to channel 41+ (which had just been vacated by analogue HTV Wales). In addition to the power increase to 100 kW ERP, it was reconfigured to 64QAM and 8k carriers, which resulted in a service area similar to the old analogue transmissions but with much more bandwidth available than Multiplex 1 ever had.

For the duration of the switchover, all the channels carried on Multiplex B were duplicated on this new PSB1 multiplex.

Channel 30 was re-used for Multiplex C, freeing Multiplex C's old allocation at channel 43-

Frequency	UHF	kW	Service	System
546.000 MHz	30	5	Arqiva (Mux C)	DVB-T
578.000 MHz	34	5	Digital 3&4 (Mux 2)	DVB-T
625.833 MHz	40-	5	SDN (Mux A)	DVB-T
634.166 MHz	41+	100	BBC A	DVB-T
655.25 MHz	44	500	BBC1 Wales	PAL System I
673.833 MHz	46-	5	Arqiva (Mux D)	DVB-T
679.25 MHz	47	500	S4C	PAL System I
705.833 MHz	50-	5	BBC (Mux B)	DVB-T
711.25 MHz	51	500	HTV Wales	PAL System I

=== Digital television ===
==== 31 March 2010 - 27 April 2011 ====
All remaining analogue television was shut down after 40 years of service. The pre-switchover low-power digital transmissions (apart from Arqiva A and SDN) were upgraded to full power and configured to 64QAM and 8k carriers, with frequency changes and with new names for the multiplexes:

Frequency	UHF	kW	Operator
546.000 MHz	30	10	Arqiva A
634.166 MHz	41+	100	BBC A
658.000 MHz	44	100	Digital 3&4
682.000 MHz	47	100	BBC B†
698.000 MHz	49	50	Arqiva B
714.000 MHz	51	10	SDN

† High-definition channels; BBC One HD, BBC HD, ITV1 HD and S4C Clirlun using DVB-T2 transmission, coded with MPEG4 100 kW ERP.

==== 27 April 2011 - 23 January 2013 ====
Unusually, the digital switchover at Wenvoe required a third phase to allow time for channels 42 and 45 to be cleared at Ridge Hill. At this point, Arq A and SDN were shifted fully into the group with a power increase:

Frequency	UHF	kW	Operator
634.166 MHz	41+	100	BBC A
642.166 MHz	42+	50	SDN
658.000 MHz	44	100	Digital 3&4
666.000 MHz	45	50	Arqiva A
682.000 MHz	47	100	BBC B
698.000 MHz	49	50	Arqiva B

==== 23 January 2013 - 10 December 2013 ====
As a side-effect of frequency-changes elsewhere in the region to do with clearance of the 800 MHz band for 4G mobile phone use, Wenvoe's "Arqiva B" multiplex was moved from channel 49 to channel 39. This was to allow channel 49 to be taken over at a future date by the Mendip transmitter.

Frequency	UHF	kW	Operator
618.000 MHz	39	50	Arqiva B
634.166 MHz	41+	100	BBC A
642.166 MHz	42+	50	SDN
658.000 MHz	44	100	Digital 3&4
666.000 MHz	45	50	Arqiva A
682.000 MHz	47	100	BBC B

==== 10 December 2013 - 24 June 2020 ====
Following changes in the 700 MHz Band on 15 May and 6 June 2019, the Arqiva COM7 multiplex is transmitted on UHF Channel 55 and the COM8 multiplex is on UHF Channel 56. These multiplexes carry additional HD services. The Local TV Multiplex is on UHF Channel 37 and commenced antenna tests around 1 December 2013.

Frequency	UHF	kW	Operator	System
602.000 MHz	37	10	Local TV	DVB-T
618.000 MHz	39	50	Arqiva B	DVB-T
634.166 MHz	41+	100	BBC A	DVB-T
642.166 MHz	42+	50	SDN	DVB-T
658.000 MHz	44	100	Digital 3&4	DVB-T
666.000 MHz	45	50	Arqiva A	DVB-T
682.000 MHz	47	100	BBC B	DVB-T2
746.000 MHz	55	40.7	COM7	DVB-T2
754.000 MHz	56	40.7	COM8	DVB-T2

==== 25 June 2020 - present ====
Following changes in the 700 MHz Band, on 22 June 2020, the Arqiva COM8 multiplex was switched off permanently on UHF Channel 56. Arqiva COM7 multiplex was switched off on the 30th June 2022.

Frequency	UHF	kW	Operator	System
602.000 MHz	37	10	Local TV	DVB-T
618.000 MHz	39	50	Arqiva B	DVB-T
634.166 MHz	41+	100	BBC A	DVB-T
642.166 MHz	42+	50	SDN	DVB-T
658.000 MHz	44	100	Digital 3&4	DVB-T
666.000 MHz	45	50	Arqiva A	DVB-T
682.000 MHz	47	100	BBC B	DVB-T2

=== Analogue radio (VHF FM) ===
==== 1956 - Winter 1981 ====
Wenvoe used a rather erratic set of frequencies at the start, bandplan changes agreed in 1978 were brought into play in 1981.

Frequency	kW	Service
89.95 MHz	113	BBC Light Programme
92.125 MHz	113	BBC Home Service (West)
94.3 MHz	113	BBC Welsh Home Service
96.8 MHz	113	BBC Third Programme

==== Present ====
BBC Radio 1, BBC Radio 2, BBC Radio 3, BBC Radio 4 and Classic FM broadcast to South Wales and the West Country from the Wenvoe site. The use of high ERP and use of omni-directional antenna systems create a wide broadcast footprint. Several relays extend the coverage of the Wenvoe site, the largest of which being Ridge Hill, extending coverage to parts of the West Midlands on its own designated frequencies.

BBC Radio 1 has a directional null to prevent co-channel interference with continental transmitters in France.

Radio Cymru and Radio Wales have the same radiation pattern but different effective radiated powers. Radio Wales has a lower ERP to prevent it interfering with BBC Radio Cornwall on the same frequency.

Nation Radio is broadcast at low power to ensure sufficient coverage of Cardiff, Newport and Bridgend. In 2026, Capital South Wales was moved to Wenvoe from the nearby Wenallt site, sharing the Nation Radio antenna systems temporarily, awaiting a permanent broadcast licence.

Frequency	ERP (kW)	Service	Coverage
89.9 MHz	250.00	BBC Radio 2	MCA Map
92.1 MHz	250.00	BBC Radio 3	MCA Map
94.3 MHz	250.00	BBC Radio 4	MCA Map
96.8 MHz	250.00	BBC Radio Cymru	MCA Map
99.5 MHz	250.00	BBC Radio 1	MCA Map
101.7 MHz	250.00	Classic FM	MCA Map
103.2 MHz	1.040	Capital South Wales	
103.9 MHz	40.00	BBC Radio Wales	MCA Map
106.8 MHz	4.54	Nation Radio Wales	MCA Map

=== Digital Radio (DAB) ===
Digital Radio is transmitted from Wenvoe at high power and is designed to cover South Wales and the West Country.

Frequency	Block	kW	Operator
216.920 MHz	11A	8.795	Sound Digital
222.064 MHz	11D	9.000	Digital One
225.648 MHz	12B	8.000	BBC National DAB
227.360 MHz	12C	3.820	South East Wales

== See also ==
- Radio masts and towers
- List of masts
- List of tallest buildings and structures in Great Britain
