= Radio Carmarthenshire =

Radio station in Carmarthenshire, Wales

Coordinates: 51.798047°N 4.743004°W

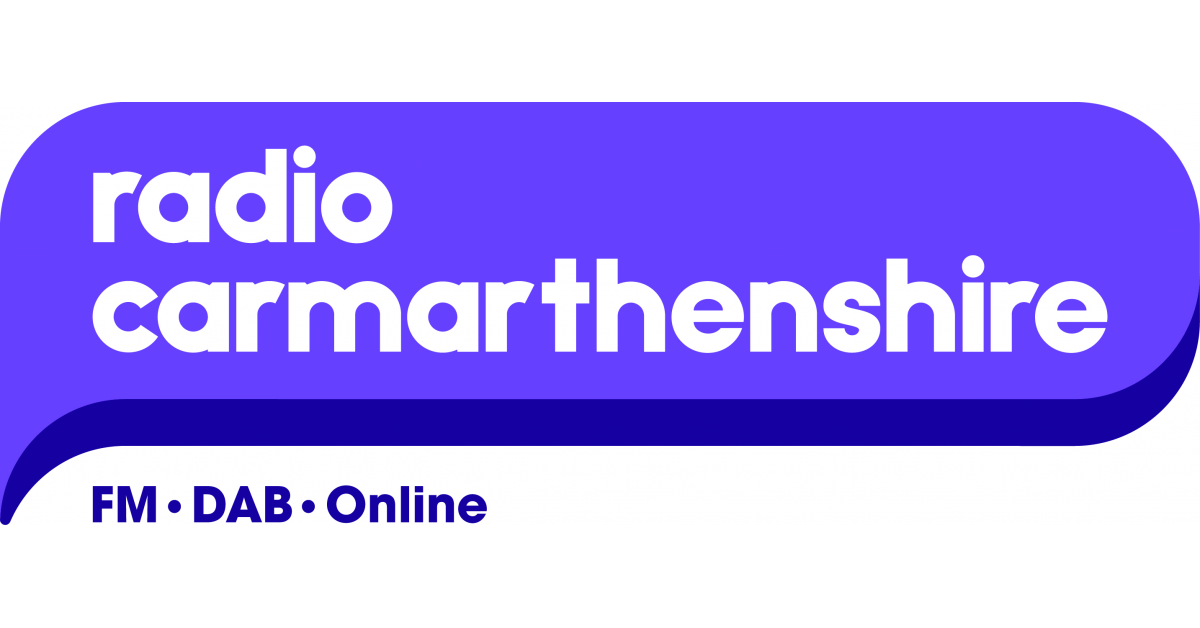
- United Kingdom
- Broadcast area: Carmarthenshire
- Frequencies: FM: 97.1 MHz (Carmarthenshire), 97.5 MHz (Carmarthen and Llanelli)

Programming
- Format: AC

Ownership
- Owner: Nation Broadcasting

History
- First air date: 13 June 2004; 22 years ago

Links
- Website: radiocarmarthenshire.com

Radio Carmarthenshire is an Independent Local Radio station broadcasting to Carmarthenshire. It is owned and operated by Nation Broadcasting and broadcasts on 97.1 and 97.5 FM from studios near the St Hilary transmitter in the Vale of Glamorgan.

The station plays chart music from the 1980s to the present day, alongside local news, weather, travel and community information.

As of June 2024, the station broadcasts to a weekly audience of 19,000, according to RAJAR.

== History ==
Following the successful launch of Radio Pembrokeshire in 2002, the owners, led by Keri Jones, founded Radio Carmarthenshire in mid-2003 in order to bid for the Carmarthenshire licence. Another applicant, Carmarthenshire Sound (led by The Wireless Group – owners of the Swansea-based stations The Wave and Swansea Sound) withdrew from the bidding process, leaving Radio Carmarthenshire unopposed.

The station began broadcasting on Sunday 13 June 2004 from Radio Pembrokeshire's Narberth studios. Four months after launch, the station was given a yellow card warning by the broadcasting regulator OFCOM, following complaints about the levels of Welsh language programming as it broadcast no Welsh language content.

In August 2006, the station was sold to Town & Country Broadcasting (now Nation Broadcasting).

In September 2016, Nation Broadcasting announced plans to relocate Radio Carmarthenshire and its two sister services from the Narberth studios to the group's headquarters near the St Hilary transmitter on the outskirts of Cowbridge. The station switched broadcasting to the St Hilary studios at 10 am on Tuesday 22 November 2016, although the Narberth site was retained as a studio for digital multimedia, marketing and as a sales office.

== Programming ==
The majority of Radio Carmarthenshire's output is produced and broadcast from Nation Broadcasting's St Hilary studios. Most programming and presenters are shared with sister stations Swansea Bay Radio, Radio Pembrokeshire and Bridge FM.

Presenter-led shows air from 6 am to 7 pm on weekdays, 8 am to 6 pm on Saturdays and 6 am to 10 pm on Sundays. A weekly hour-long Welsh language music programme on Sunday evenings, shared with Radio Pembrokeshire.

=== News ===
Local news bulletins air hourly from 6am – 7pm on weekdays and 7am – 1pm at weekends with headlines on the half-hour during weekday breakfast and drivetime.

As of 2021, the station's local bulletins are produced under contract by Bauer's Swansea newsroom.

National news bulletins from Sky News Radio air hourly at other times.
