= Bridge FM (Wales) =

Coordinates: 51.504665°N 3.570254°W

- Bridgend; United Kingdom
- Broadcast area: Bridgend
- Frequency: FM: 106.3 MHz
- RDS: BridgeFM

Programming
- Format: AC

Ownership
- Owner: Nation Broadcasting

History
- First air date: May 1, 2000

Links
- Website: bridgefm.wales

Bridge FM is an Independent Local Radio station in Wales, broadcasting to Bridgend county. It is owned and operated by Nation Broadcasting and broadcasts on 106.3 FM and DAB from studios at the St Hilary transmitter in the Vale of Glamorgan. The station plays chart music from the 1980s to the present day, alongside local news, travel and community information.

As of March 2024, the station broadcasts to a weekly audience of 19,000, according to RAJAR.

== Overview ==
Bridge FM was formerly owned by Tindle Radio but was sold to Town and Country Broadcasting (now Nation Broadcasting) in 2006, becoming the company's fifth local radio station.

The first Bridge FM logo, used between 2000 and 2003

The second Bridge FM logo, 2003–2006

The third Bridge FM logo, 2006–2015

=== Programming ===
Bridge FM's output is produced and broadcast from Nation Broadcasting's St Hilary studios on FM, DAB and online. Most programming and presenters are shared with sister stations Swansea Bay Radio, Radio Pembrokeshire and Radio Carmarthenshire. Presenter-led shows air from 6am to 7pm on weekdays, and 6am to 6pm at the weekend.

=== News ===
Local news bulletins air hourly from 6am to 7pm on weekdays and 7am to 1pm at weekends, with headlines on the half-hour during weekday breakfast and drivetime. National news bulletins from Sky News Radio air hourly at other times.
