= Hits Radio South Wales =

- Swansea; United Kingdom
- Broadcast area: Swansea, Neath Port Talbot and South Carmarthenshire
- Frequencies: FM: 96.4 MHz; DAB: 12A
- RDS: Hits
- Branding: South Wales' Hits Radio; The Biggest Hits, The Biggest Throwbacks

Programming
- Format: CHR/Pop
- Network: Hits Radio

Ownership
- Owner: Bauer Media Audio UK
- Sister stations: Greatest Hits Radio South Wales

History
- First air date: 30 September 1974 (50 years ago)
- Former names: Swansea Sound (1974–1995); Sound Wave (1995–1998); The Wave (1998–2024)
- Former frequencies: 95.1 FM; 1169 MW; 1170 MW

Technical information
- Transmitter coordinates: 51°37′45″N 3°55′13″W

Links
- Website: Hits Radio South Wales

Hits Radio South Wales, formerly The Wave, is an Independent Local Radio station owned and operated by Bauer Media Audio UK as part of the Hits Radio network. It broadcasts to Swansea, Neath Port Talbot and South Carmarthenshire.

As of September 2024, the station has a weekly audience of 156,000 listeners according to RAJAR.

== History ==
=== Early years ===
Initially broadcasting as 257 Swansea Sound on 1169 AM and 95.1 FM on 30 September 1974, the AM frequency was later adjusted to 1170 and FM changed to 96.4. The station split into two separate services on 30 September 1995, creating a new music-led station called 96.4 Sound Wave, while Swansea Sound continued to broadcast on 1170 AM. The separate stations were based at studios in Gowerton, from where Swansea Sound began broadcasting. In 1998, the FM station changed its name to 96.4 The Wave.

=== The Wave ===
==== 2000s ====
The Wave's former radio logo from 2003.

In 2002, The Radio Authority announced plans for a Swansea DAB multiplex to form, allowing The Wave to broadcast on a digital platform under the format of contemporary hit radio. 2003 saw the station adding the South Wales' Hit Music tagline as their slogan as well as a highly popular competition called A Week on Wheels, which returned the following year as a promotion.

In January 2004, The Wave was officially launched on the new DAB multiplex. The Wave came under management of UTV Radio in 2005, when the company acquired The Wireless Group, the owner of the station in the early 2000s.

The station also ran Party in the Park concerts in Singleton Park, Swansea for many years, but due to the financial cost, the event ended in 2006. Instead, The Wave began a partnership with Escape into the Park, a similar music event involving mostly contemporary dance music.

In 2008, The Wave began using the marketing brand You Love It, We Play It, which was processed by then-owners UTV Radio. The following year, the station switched to the Today's Best Mix strapline.

==== 2010s ====
The Wave logo used from 2010 to 2014, and until 2016.

The Wave and Swansea Sound were involved in UTV Media's Wales Live scheme, an aborted attempt to provide a service designed to support local news through radio, television and online services. The project was set to launch by October 2010, but ultimately failed.

The Wave, along with other local commercial radio stations in the United Kingdom, became a part of the Radioplayer UK project, an internet service formed by the BBC, Global Radio and the Guardian Media Group to supply a listen live feed of UK radio stations across the world. The Wave's owner, UTV, was renamed the Wireless Group in 2016. On 8 February 2019, The Wave was sold alongside Swansea Sound and the Wireless Group's network of local radio stations to Bauer Radio.

==== 2020s ====
In May 2020, Bauer announced that The Wave would join the Hits Radio network, while retaining its localised on-air branding. The Wave began carrying most of the network's off-peak programming from Manchester from 15 June 2020. The Wave officially joined the Hits Radio network on 20 July 2020. In May 2022, The Wave began broadcasting network programming after the local breakfast show on weekdays, alongside hourly local news bulletins seven days a week and traffic updates at peak times.

=== Hits Radio rebrand ===
In January 2024, The Wave moved from its former Gowerton studios to a new base in the Llansamlet area of Swansea. Later that month, station owners Bauer announced The Wave would be rebranded as Hits Radio from 17 April 2024, as part of a network-wide relaunch involving 17 local radio stations in England and Wales. The local breakfast show that was retained, along with local news and traffic bulletins, with the station rebranded Hits Radio South Wales.

On 20 March 2025, Bauer announced it would end its local Hits Radio breakfast show to be replaced by a new national breakfast show for England and Wales. Local news and traffic bulletins were retained but the station's Swansea studios were closed. The station's final local programme aired on 6 June 2025.

== Coverage area ==
The station's official Ofcom measured coverage area covers Swansea, Neath Port Talbot and South Carmarthenshire on 96.4 FM, with the signal coming off the transmitters on Kilvey Hill. Hits Radio also broadcasts on DAB, online and on the station app.

== Music policy ==
The station broadcasts a contemporary hit radio format by syndicating Bauer's Hits Radio playlist.

== Programming ==
Hits Radio network programming is broadcast and produced from Bauer's London headquarters or studios in Manchester & occasionally Newcastle.

== Notable Past Presenters ==
- Claire Scott
- Leigh Jones
- Andy (Badger) Miles
- Siany Martin
- Jamie Pritchard
- Steve Barnes

=== News ===
Hits Radio South Wales broadcasts local news bulletins hourly from 6am-7pm on weekdays and from 7am-1pm on weekends. Headlines are broadcast on the half-hour during weekday breakfast and drivetime shows. The local bulletins also air on sister station Greatest Hits Radio South Wales.

The station also simulcasts hourly Sky News Radio bulletins at all other times.

== See also ==
- Greatest Hits Radio South Wales (formerly Swansea Sound)
