= Greatest Hits Radio South Wales =

Coordinates: 51.6515°N 4.0388°W

- Swansea; United Kingdom
- Broadcast area: Swansea, Neath Port Talbot and Carmarthenshire
- Frequency: DAB: 12A

Programming
- Format: Classic hits
- Network: Greatest Hits Radio

Ownership
- Owner: Bauer
- Sister stations: Hits Radio South Wales

History
- First air date: 30 September 1974 (as Swansea Sound)
- Last air date: July 2022 (on 1170 kHz).
- Former names: Swansea Sound
- Former frequencies: 1170kHz

Links
- Website: GHR South Wales

Greatest Hits Radio South Wales (formerly Swansea Sound) is an Independent Local Radio station owned and operated by Bauer Radio as part of the Greatest Hits Radio network. The station broadcasts to Swansea, Neath Port Talbot and Carmarthenshire from studios in the Llansamlet area of Swansea on DAB.

Up until 2022, the station broadcast on 1170 kHz.

As of March 2024, the station broadcasts to a weekly audience of 136,000, according to RAJAR.

== History ==
=== Launch ===
Swansea Sound began broadcasting at 6am, on Monday 30 September 1974. The first voice heard on air was its managing director, Charles Braham:

"Bore da. Good Morning. As managing director I am very proud to say for the very first time that this is Swansea Sound bringing independent radio to Wales, to entertain, to inform and above all give yourselves a real involvement in community matters..."

Chris Harper presented the station's first breakfast show, opening with MFSB's Love Is The Message. At its launch, it was the first and only commercial radio station in Wales and the seventh in the United Kingdom. It was also the first independent radio station to broadcast a bilingual service in the English and Welsh languages.

Originally, the station broadcast on 257 metres (1170 kHz) AM and 95.1 FM before moving its FM frequency to 96.4 in the early 1980s.

==== Frequency split, launch of The Wave (1995) ====
Until the early 1990s, FM adoption in the UK was relatively low, so it was common practice among stations to simulcast their programming on both AM and FM frequencies. Starting in the late 1980s, the UK government and the IBA required that ILR and BBC stations cease simulcasting and provide separate services on their AM and FM frequencies.

In September 1995, Swansea Sound's FM frequency became a CHR (contemporary hit radio) station called 96.4 Sound Wave (later 96.4 The Wave, now Hits Radio South Wales), while Swansea Sound continued to broadcast its full service format on 1170 AM.

==== Sale to UTV Media (2006) ====
In 2006, UTV Media purchased the Wireless Group, owners of radio stations across the UK including Swansea Sound. It gave the station a new jingle package, logo and slogans, as well as a significant expansion to local programming.

In late 2016, UTV's television assets were sold to ITV plc. The radio division of the company was later sold to News UK, and renamed back to its original name, the Wireless Group.

At News UK, its sister stations included TalkSport and the relaunched Virgin Radio UK.

=== Station sale; rebrand as Greatest Hits Radio (2020) ===
The final Swansea Sound logo used before its rebrand.

On 8 February 2019, Swansea Sound was sold alongside The Wave and the Wireless Group's network of local radio stations to Bauer Radio. The sale was ratified in March 2020 following an inquiry by the Competition and Markets Authority.

Under the terms of the deal, both Swansea Sound and The Wave, along with over 40 stations brought by Bauer in a "hold separate" ownership until early 2020.

On 27 May 2020, Bauer announced that Swansea Sound would rebrand and join the Greatest Hits Radio network from 1 September 2020.

Most of the station's local output - including Breakfast, daytime and Welsh language shows - was retained due to conditions placed on the station's AM broadcast licence by OFCOM.

As of April 2021, Greatest Hits Radio broadcasts 15 hours of local programming each weekday, four hours on Saturdays and six hours on Sundays, alongside hourly local news bulletins and peak-time traffic updates.

In July 2022, Greatest Hits Radio ended broadcasting on its medium-wave transmitter (1170 kHz) in South West Wales, after nearly 48 years on air. The closedown also removed the OFCOM requirement for the station to broadcast separate programming.

=== Local programming cuts ===
On 12 January 2023, it was announced that, in April 2023, Greatest Hits Radio would replace its local daytime programming - including breakfast, morning and afternoon shows - with networked programmes.

Bauer management told the industry news website, RadioToday, that the separate content for South Wales was no longer viable going forwards, although the station would retain its late-night Welsh-language programme, airing from Sunday to Thursday nights. The station is also expected to retain opt-outs for local news bulletins, traffic updates and advertising. A small number of contracts for freelance presenters were reported as up for review. As of September 2022, RAJAR reported the station had a reach of 14,000 weekly listeners.

On 2 April 2023, the station broadcast its final English-language local programme. It was hosted by long-serving presenter Steve Dewitt from the Gowerton studios. The station's Welsh-language show, presented by Gareth Hurford, ended in November 2023.

== See also ==
- Greatest Hits Radio
- Hits Radio South Wales (formally The Wave)
