= History of ITV =

History of UK commercial TV network

The history of ITV, the United Kingdom and Crown Dependencies "Independent Television" commercial network, goes back to 1955.

Independent Television began as a network of independently owned regional companies that were both broadcasters and programme makers, beginning with four companies operating six stations in three large regions in 1955–1956, and gradually expanding to 17 stations in 14 regions by 1962. Each regional station was responsible for its own branding, scheduling and advertising, with many peak-time programmes shared simultaneously across the whole network.

By 29 February 2016, 12 regions in England and Wales, the Channel Islands and the Isle of Man shared national ITV branding and scheduling, and, together with a 13th region UTV in Northern Ireland, were owned by a single company, ITV plc. A further two regions in Scotland carry STV branding and are owned by the STV Group.

== 1955–1964 ==
=== Formation ===
The Independent Television network in 1956, one year after first transmissions

The ITV regions after all companies had begun broadcasting in 1962

The Independent Television network came about as a result of the Television Act 1954, which paved the way for the establishment of a commercial television service in the United Kingdom and created the Independent Television Authority (ITA). The act itself was not without controversy, and much debate ensued both in the British Parliament and the national press, and it was passed on the basis that the ITA would regulate the new service and ensure that the new service did not follow the same path taken by the American networks (which were perceived as 'vulgar' by some commentators).

For example, it was made obligatory that commercials would have to be clearly distinguishable from programmes. At the time, programmes in the USA were normally sponsored by a single company, so it was not uncommon for a game show host to step away from their podium after a round to sell cars or The Flintstones to segue into an ad for cigarettes with no perceived change from show to advertising.

The new "Independent Television" network, named due to its independence from the BBC which until then had a monopoly on broadcasting within the United Kingdom, was made up of numerous companies providing a regional television service and would also generally provide programmes to the network as a whole. Each individual company broadcast on 405-line VHF and was responsible for providing a local service, including daily news bulletins and local documentaries, and for selling advertising space on their channel: this measure ensured that all the independent companies were in competition with each other and that no single broadcaster could gain a monopoly over commercial broadcasting.

Similar to how British newspapers separate their operations between Saturdays and Sundays, versus Monday through Friday, the ITA divided the franchises between weekends and weekdays. Upon the creation of the network, six franchises were awarded for London (14 million people), the Midlands around Birmingham (10 million), and the North of England around Manchester (14 million). The companies in these regions were known as 'The Big Four' and consisted of Associated-Rediffusion (London weekday), ATV (Midlands weekday and London weekend), Granada Television (North of England weekday) and ABC (North of England and Midlands weekend). These companies were generally the best known and provided the most network output.

The ITA intended that the larger franchisees, with the most revenue, act as "network companies" that would produce most programmes broadcast nationally, while the other franchisees, as "regional companies", would primarily focus on programmes for their own areas. ITV companies that broadcast a programme paid varying fractions of the production cost, and ITA approved all scripts. After choosing the first four franchisees, ITA decided that national news would be provided by a separate contractor, Independent Television News (ITN). Each regional service had its own on-screen identity to distinguish it from other regions, since there was often a sizeable overlap in reception capability within each region.

=== Launch ===
The opening night broadcast on Associated-Rediffusion

The first ITA contractor to begin broadcasting was the London weekday contractor Associated-Rediffusion, on 22 September 1955 beginning at 7.15pm. On the first night of telecasts, the BBC, who had held the monopoly on broadcasting in Britain, aired a melodramatic episode of its popular radio soap opera The Archers on the BBC Home Service (later became BBC Radio 4 in 1967). In the episode, core character Grace Archer was fatally injured in a fire, and it was seen as a ploy to keep loyal viewers and listeners away from the new station.

Among the programmes on the first night were three excerpts from plays, including Margaret Leighton, John Gielgud, and Edith Evans in The Importance of Being Earnest. At 8:12 pm, the first commercial said of Gibbs SR toothpaste: "It's tingling fresh, it's fresh as ice". Christopher Chataway was ITN's first newsreader, at 10 pm. The first full day of transmissions was 23 September 1955 when Britain's first female newsreader Barbara Mandell appeared. The London weekend contractor ATV launched two days later.

Early television commercials were staid adaptations of newspaper advertisements. The British industry was unfamiliar with the format, but also did not want to seem too Americanized. ITV was only available to the one eighth of Britons living in the London area. Popular shows in its first year included The Adventures of the Scarlet Pimpernel, The Adventures of Robin Hood, Sunday Night at the London Palladium, and American imports Dragnet, I Love Lucy, and Gun Law. The other franchises launched within a year of the London launch, and other contracts were awarded by the ITA between 1956 and 1961. All the franchises had launched by September 1962:

Franchise awarded	Launch date	Regional area	Programme company
26 October 1954	22 September 1955	London (weekday)	Associated-Rediffusion
26 October 1954	24 September 1955	London (weekend)	ATV (Associated Television)
26 October 1954	17 February 1956	Midlands (weekday)	ATV (Associated Television)
21 September 1955	18 February 1956	Midlands (weekend)	ABC Weekend TV (Originally awarded to Kemsley-Winnick Television on 26 October 1954)
26 October 1954	3 May 1956	North of England (weekday)	Granada Television
21 September 1955	5 May 1956	North of England (weekend)	ABC Weekend TV (Originally awarded to Kemsley-Winnick Television on 26 October 1954)
30 May 1956	31 August 1957	Central Scotland	Scottish Television (STV)
26 October 1956	14 January 1958	South Wales and West of England	TWW (Television Wales and the West)
22 July 1957	30 August 1958	South of England (includes South East England from 31 January 1960)	Southern Television
13 December 1957	15 January 1959	North East England	Tyne Tees Television
25 June 1958	27 October 1959	East of England (includes Lincolnshire and East Riding of Yorkshire from 20 December 1965)	Anglia Television
10 November 1958	31 October 1959	Northern Ireland	Ulster Television (UTV)
16 December 1959	29 April 1961	South West England	Westward Television
5 May 1960	1 September 1961	English-Scottish Border (includes Isle of Man from 26 March 1965)	Border Television
2 August 1960	30 September 1961	North East Scotland	Grampian Television
28 March 1960	1 September 1962	Channel Islands	Channel Television (CTV)
6 June 1961	14 September 1962	West and North Wales	Wales (West and North) Television/Teledu Cymru

Not all ITV franchisees were profitable in their early years; they benefited from the end of the Toddlers' Truce in 1957. Franchisees also broadcast shows that emphasised product placement; Parliament banned such admags, including the popular soap opera Jim's Inn, in 1963. IBA had banned "time spots", in which advertisers gave the current time and stated "time to" have a cigarette or use some other product, in 1960.

ITV was admitted as an active member of the European Broadcasting Union through the Independent Television Companies' Association Ltd together with the ITA on 1 January 1960.

== 1964–1968 ==
The ITV regions after Teledu Cymru had been taken over by TWW in 1964 and its area had been extended in 1965

An American television executive predicted in 1955 that the first six franchises, with only the BBC as competition for their population of 38 million, would be "perhaps the richest commercial television monopoly in the world". Roy Thomson of Scottish Television described the ownership of an ITV franchise as "a licence to print money", a comment he and ITV would regret. Overall, the regional companies made a profit within the first few years of their existence, the largest regions especially so.

The franchises provided daily televised local news to regions that the BBC had never served, helping to fulfill ITA director Robert Fraser's description of ITV as "the people's television".

In 1963, the ITA chairman, Lord Hill of Luton, initiated a review of all the ITV companies following the release of the Pilkington Report, which saw the launch of BBC2 and heavily criticised ITV. This review would review a company's performance, and either grant them an extension to their service licence or replace the company with another in that region. This process was repeated frequently throughout the early life of ITV and lasted approximately ten years. Reviews like this also ensured that the companies maintained their high performance by maintaining the possibility of the loss of their licence. The new licences also included clauses which took into account the promise of an "ITV2" UHF channel to be launched if the Conservative Party won the 1964 general election.

Despite the review, no company lost its position as the local ITV contractor for their region and all licences were extended for another three years (starting July 1964), although several of the major companies were instructed to strengthen the regional emphasis of their on-screen identities. The only change to the network was the formation of a single Wales and West franchise, operated by TWW, following the collapse of WWN and its subsequent takeover by TWW. WWN ran into trouble when it had problems with the construction of its transmitter network, as well as strict provisions in its contract to produce a large amount of Welsh-language programming. This meant that WWN lost a lot of money and, despite some help from other ITV companies, it declared itself bankrupt on 26 January 1964 – the only ITV company to have ever done so.

At a 1965 dinner at Guildhall, London to celebrate ITV's first ten years, Prime Minister Harold Wilson said "independent television has become part of our national anatomy. More than that, it has become part of our social system and part of our national way of life". The network stopped broadcasting cigarette commercials that year, affecting £8 million in annual revenue.

== 1968–1974 ==
The ITV regions after the major change in contracts in 1968

An author wrote in 1972:

One might call ITV the working-man's television, the BBC being more middle-class in its flavour. Indeed, over the years there have really been two types of viewer in Britain: the BBC viewer who occasionally looks at ITV and the ITV viewer who occasionally looks at BBC (probably for sport).

From August 1968 to August 1970, ITV had 50% or higher share of television viewing hours in every month except one. For the week of 27 September 1970 its most popular programme was Special Branch with 6.95 million viewing homes, followed by Coronation Street and ITV News at Ten at 6.90 million homes each. 6.15 million homes viewed Dad's Army, one of only three BBC shows in the top 20. While BBC had a slightly higher share of ABC1 NRS social graded homes in the London ITV area, ITV more than doubled BBC's share of C2 homes, and also led in DE homes.

Another franchise review was called by the ITA on 12 June 1967, for contracts running from the end of July 1968, that was to drastically change the structure of ITV itself. The review aimed to ensure that the ITV system was ready for the impending arrival of colour broadcasting, and also to again allow for the potential start of ITV2, should the Conservatives win any general election held after 1970.

The 14 existing companies, and 16 new groups, made 36 total applications for the new contract period. ITV's official history of its first 25 years would later write that "many strangely named consortia were formed". The behaviour of some of the companies only reinforced the ITA's assumptions of 'arrogance' following the few changes in the last franchise round: Rediffusion London's department managers also popped up in similar roles for rival applications and TWW reapplied for their contract under both their own name and that of WWN/Teledu Cymru as a tax dodge. As a result, Lord Hill had made it clear in 1966 that "all bets were off" on the next franchise round and that the regions themselves might change. Therefore, in the period between the interviews of each applicant and the announcement of the changes, the newspapers speculated wildly about the likely changes: suggestions were made of Scottish Television exiting the system, Rediffusion London moving to replace Southern Television and various other wild ideas.

In the end, the changes made to the ITV regions were as follows:

- The weekend franchises in the North of England and the Midlands were abolished.
- The North of England region was split into two new smaller regions, the North West and Yorkshire. Seven-day contracts were specified in both these new regions, as well as in the Midlands.
- Separate weekday and weekend franchises continued in London; however, the handover time was moved from the beginning of Saturday to Friday at 7.00pm.

The ITV companies themselves changed considerably. Some merely had their contracts changed, while others were replaced altogether by new companies. The changes were as follows:

- TWW controversially lost the Wales and West of England franchise to a new company, Harlech Television (later shortened to HTV on 4 April 1970). Unhappy with the development, TWW ceased broadcasting on 4 March 1968 – nearly five months before its contract was due to expire – with the ITA providing an interim service until Harlech Television took over on 20 May.
- ATV lost the London weekend franchise to a consortium led by David Frost, called the London Television Consortium, which was soon renamed London Weekend Television. It had been expected that ABC would take over this franchise.
- ATV was awarded the seven-day contract for the Midlands region, replacing ABC at the weekends.
- Granada Television was awarded the seven-day contract for the new North West region, again replacing ABC at the weekends.
- Two consortia applied for the new Yorkshire region, Telefusion Yorkshire and Yorkshire Independent Television. The region was awarded to Telefusion, on the basis that it merged with Yorkshire Independent. The merged company took the name Yorkshire Television, replacing Granada on weekdays and ABC at the weekends.
- Rediffusion and ABC were asked to form a joint company for the London weekday franchise, in an attempt by the ITA to keep ABC in the network. This company, Thames Television, was controlled by ABC, who owned 51% while Rediffusion owned 49%.
- Roy Thomson, later Baron Thomson of Fleet, was required to divest himself of most of his holding in Scottish Television.

In 1966 ITA announced that as of 1968 there would be five major network companies. Thames, LWT, ATV, Granada and Yorkshire replaced the "Big Four" of Rediffusion, ATV, ABC and Granada, who had produced most of the network output.

In addition, the Independent Television Publications company was formed to produce a national ITV programme schedule listings magazine. This magazine was called the TV Times, originally the title of the London listings magazine (and also briefly used by the Midlands magazine). It replaced all of the regional magazines, except the Channel Islands publication, which continued until 19 October 1991.

Before the changes were implemented, however, Prime Minister Wilson appointed Lord Hill as chairman of the BBC Board of Governors and replaced him with Herbert Bowden, also known as Lord Aylestone. He reviewed the changes Hill had made but allowed them to stand.

=== Scheduling ===
The ITV schedule was officially created by the Network Programme Committee six times each year, with representatives from all franchises, ITN, and ITA. In reality, the Independent Television Companies Association's Programme Controllers' Committee—representing the Big Five—decided which programmes aired in network programme time slots. They competed for the best schedules for their own productions long before the Network Programme Committee meetings. Others had to create programmes without knowing that they would get a time slot; for example, the Big Five produced 94 of the 104 plays ITV broadcast annually. As a result, many of the small franchises had unused studio space.

=== 1968 strike ===
The implementation of the ITV changes led to industrial unrest in the companies. Although there were no job losses in the system – this was an ITA stipulation – people were forced to move from Manchester and Birmingham to Leeds, from London to Cardiff and, perhaps less troublesome, from one part of London to another. Many staff stayed in the same jobs in the same locations, but now had a different employer. Since this meant that staff were being made redundant (albeit with a guaranteed job to go to), the unions required redundancy payments. However, these payments led to problems in staff not receiving them, who were changing company but not location, as in the case of the Teddington Studios. The unions asked for payments to be made in those cases; the companies responded by drawing the line, and wildcat strikes broke out in the weeks before and after the changes came into effect.

By Friday, after the changes, a mixture of strike action and management lock-outs had taken ITV off the air, and for most of August 1968, the regional network was replaced with a single national service run by management. By September 1968, with both sides claiming victory, all workers had returned to work. However, memory of this strike would cause more industrial unrest in the decades that followed.

=== Post-strike and colour television ===
This era also saw the introduction of colour television to the network and the introduction of the new 625-line system. During the 1960s, some commercial companies proposed the introduction of colour on the 405-line system, but the General Post Office insisted that colour should wait until the higher-definition 625-line UHF system became standard.

ITV eventually introduced PAL colour on this system from 1969, on the same day as BBC1 and two years after BBC2. This did not, however, spread immediately across the United Kingdom, as some regions had to wait a few more years before colour was available:

Regional area	Programme company	Colour service date
Midlands	ATV (Associated Television)	15 November 1969
North West England	Granada Television	15 November 1969
Yorkshire	Yorkshire Television	15 November 1969
London (weekend)	London Weekend Television (LWT)	15 November 1969
London (weekday)	Thames Television	17 November 1969
South and South East England	Southern Television	13 December 1969
Central Scotland	Scottish Television (STV)	13 December 1969
Wales and West of England	Harlech Television (HTV)	6 April 1970
North East England	Tyne Tees Television	17 July 1970
Northern Ireland	Ulster Television (UTV)	14 September 1970
East of England	Anglia Television	1 October 1970
South West England	Westward Television	22 May 1971
Borders and Isle of Man	Border Television	1 September 1971
North East Scotland	Grampian Television	30 September 1971
Channel Islands	Channel Television (CTV)	26 July 1976

This was primarily due to the cost incurred in purchasing new broadcasting equipment and the subsequent studio upgrade that usually accompanied it.

Automobile companies rarely advertised on television during the 1960s because of a secret agreement between manufacturers. Datsun's commercials in the 1970s broke the cartel.

==== Colour strike ====
The colour strike was an industrial action by technicians at all ITV companies between 13 November 1970 and 8 February 1971 (although some shows made during this period in black and white were having their first transmission as late as December 1971) who, due to a pay dispute with their management refused to make programmes in colour.

==== Post-colour strike ====
Colour was available to nearly 100% of the United Kingdom from 1976, with the Channel Islands being the last region to be converted.^{[a]} This enabled the 405-line system to be phased out between 1982 and 1985.

=== Three-Day Week ===
The British government imposed early close downs of all three television channels (BBC1, BBC2 and ITV) from 17 December 1973 in order to save electricity during the Three-Day Week, following overtime ban by the National Union of Mineworkers between strike action in the power supply industry and effects of the oil crisis. The early close downs forced ITV (including 14 regional companies) to end their broadcasting day at 10.30pm, thus costing the network much of its advertising revenue. The restrictions were lifted temporarily on 24 December 1973 (Christmas Eve) to allow the public to enjoy festive programming. The restrictions recommenced on 7 January 1974, and ended on 8 February due to the upcoming general election.

== 1974–1981 ==
=== Before the 1979 dispute ===
The ITV regions after the minor change in contracts in 1974

Following the passing of the Sound Broadcasting Act 1972, the ITA was reconstituted as the Independent Broadcasting Authority (IBA) who took on the same role as the ITA but were also given responsibility of the new Independent Local Radio (ILR) stations.

As advertising revenue declined in the late 1960s and franchise fees increased, regional companies began merging sales forces while maintaining production independence. The BBC resisted ITV franchises' lobbying for ITV2 and longer broadcast hours. BBC would need to raise the licence fee for additional broadcast hours, while a second commercial channel would automatically receive more advertising revenue. In 1971, the Bilsdale UHF transmitter, based on the border between Yorkshire Television and Tyne Tees Television and much disputed over, was assigned to Tyne Tees Television. To compensate for this, the IBA allowed Yorkshire Television and Tyne Tees Television to consolidate into a new venture: Trident Television. Trident originally managed advertising sales for Tyne Tees Television and Yorkshire Television but was allowed a reverse takeover of both companies; Tyne Tees Television and Yorkshire Television did however retain their own studio bases, management, boards and on-screen identity.

The next franchise round in 1974 produced no changes in contractors, as the huge cost in switching to colour television would have made the companies unable to compete against rivals in a franchise battle. It also allowed the companies to recoup the cost and to return to normal service. Some slight changes were made to the Yorkshire Television franchise area however, as the Belmont transmitter in Lincolnshire switched from Anglia Television to Yorkshire Television, boosting the broadcast area.

ILR franchises were awarded for three years, extendable for one year each year; they were thus indefinite if IBA approved of the franchisee's performance. As of 1976 IBA favoured using the same approach for television.

==== Launch of Oracle teletext ====
This period also saw the launch of the Oracle teletext service. It was officially launched in 1978, a few years after the launch of the BBC's Ceefax service and offered news and information delivered through the remaining lines of information in the television transmission. The service began to see improved takings following a heavy promotional campaign using the slogan Page the Oracle and the inclusion of the software as standard in most new television sets at the beginning of the 1980s.

=== 1979 dispute ===
ITV suffered an eleven-week industrial dispute in 1979, leading to the subsequent shutdown of almost all ITV broadcasts and productions. It began at London's Thames Television when electricians, who were EETPU members, refused to accept what they considered to be a derisory pay increase. The management attempted to operate a normal service, but other transmission staff, who were ACTT members, refused to co-operate, pointing out that equipment and wiring turned on by non-EETPU members could be potentially dangerous. Thames management interpreted this as a walkout. When Thames' management consequently ordered the striking staff to "return or else", the broadcasting union, the ACTT, instructed members at thirteen other ITV stations to walk out in solidarity. The only company unaffected was Channel Television, as the unions recognised that industrial action there could lead to the station's closure, as its small audience made it vulnerable to any loss of advertising revenue.

ITV viewers, apart from in the Channel Islands, encountered blank television screens on the morning of 10 August 1979, and were left without any programmes until, later on in the strike, a specially made apology caption generated by the IBA would broadcast in 14 of the 15 ITV regions:

INDEPENDENT TELEVISION

We are sorry that programmes have been interrupted. There is an industrial dispute. Transmissions will start again as soon as possible.

Although for a time it was amended to include an appeal on behalf of the West Yorkshire Police in their hunt for the Yorkshire Ripper. The only other content broadcast outside of the Channel Television region was the IBA's Engineering Announcements.

Strangely, the caption achieved ratings of around one million, from TV sets left on in the hope that the strike would end.

Only one ITV company broadcast anything during this time, that being Channel Television, who broadcast a time-restricted service of local programming, films and imported television series (on film, as Channel had no videotape facilities at the time). An example of the emergency schedule offered by Channel Television during the strike can be seen here below, with the schedule for Thursday 6 September 1979:

- 1.20pm – Channel News and Weather
- 1.30pm – Closedown
- 5.00pm – Puffin
- 5.05pm – Call It Marcaroni
- 5.30pm – Lost Island
- 6.00pm – Report Extra
- 7.00pm – Al Oeming
- 7.30pm – The New Avengers
- 8.30pm – Film: Slightly Scarlet (1956)
- 10.00pm – Channel News and Weather
- 10.05pm – Cash and Company
- 11.00pm – Channel News Headlines and Weather
- 11.05pm – Closedown

==== Post-1979 strike ====
Programming resumed at 5.38pm on Wednesday 24 October 1979. The strike ended with victory for the unions involved in the dispute, estimated to have cost the companies £100 million in lost revenue. Channel alone lost £10,000 per week due to the strike. Technicians saw a 45% increase in their salary, from £8,000 to £11,620. Returning viewers were greeted with a new jingle, "Welcome home to ITV", sung by the Mike Sammes Singers.

The first night's schedule back after the strike was filled by programmes already "in the can" before the strike commenced. Both Crossroads and Coronation Street aired special introductions to their first episodes back, to inform viewers of the events in both soaps, where they left off back in July 1979.

The first night schedule was networked from Thames Television in London to all ITV regional companies across the United Kingdom as part of their national emergency schedule, and was as follows:

- 5.45pm – ITN News at 5.45 with Leonard Parkin
- 6.05pm – The Muppet Show (with special guest: Dudley Moore)^{[b]}
- 6.35pm – Crossroads
- 7.00pm – George and Mildred
- 7.30pm – Coronation Street
- 8.00pm – 3-2-1 with Ted Rogers (guest starring Norman Wisdom and Anna Dawson)
- 9.00pm – Quatermass (Part 1)
- 10.00pm – News at Ten with Alastair Burnet and Anna Ford
- 10.30pm – Film: Chinatown (1974)
- 1.00am – Closedown

When the strike ended, ITV had the task of luring back viewers from the BBC. This proved difficult as production of original programming had stopped and would not be available for several months; ITV therefore suffered in the ratings at the hands of the BBC. Two and a half months after ITV began broadcasting again, it was finally ready to air additional original programming and viewers began switching back. This strike was to be the last ever major strike for ITV as the power of the broadcasting unions began to wane, even though minor disputes plagued the television industry in the 1980s, and the dispute was the longest in the history of British television.

== 1982–1990 ==
The ITV regions after the major change in contracts in 1982

On 28 December 1980, the IBA announced via Lady Plowden, the then chair of the IBA, that it had reviewed the ITV broadcasting licences again, for contracts beginning on 1 January 1982. A few changes were made to the ITV structure, with the creation of dual regions for the South and South East, and the East and West Midlands. These regions were created following the push for more regional news. The company operating these regions had to provide a regional news service for both regions and provide studio facilities in both areas. The franchise round concluded with the following changes:

- ATV was re-awarded its contract for the dual Midlands region but was considered by the IBA to have not focused on the region enough. As a result, changes were ordered including the diluting of existing shareholdings, greater production facilities in the contract area and the sale of ATV Elstree Studios; to emphasise these actions the company was told to rename itself. It settled on the name Central Independent Television.
- Southern Television lost its licence for the South and South East England, in favour of South and South-East Communications, but later renamed Television South (TVS).
- Westward Television lost its licence for South West England, being replaced by Television South West (TSW), which ended up taking over Westward Television on 11 August 1981, but continued to use the Westward Television name until 1 January 1982.
- The new nationwide breakfast television service was awarded to TV-am.
- Trident Television was ordered to sell the majority of its holdings in Yorkshire Television and Tyne Tees Television, and the two companies became independent of each other again.
- The Bluebell Hill transmitter in Kent was transferred from Thames Television/LWT to TVS, to increase the size of TVS' South East sub-region.

This period saw the ITV companies, and the BBC, expand their services further into the day than previously. A large part of this was a result of the franchising of a breakfast service in 1980. TV-am was awarded this contract and given a provisional start date of May 1983. There had been other programmes previously, such as Yorkshire's Good Morning Calendar, which had shown that the public were interested in a breakfast service. As a result, TV-am and the BBC rushed their own services to the air. TV-am would broadcast between the hours of 6.00am and 9.25am (originally 9.15am) every morning; the somewhat obscure 9.25 close time came about in order to allow time to switch transmitters from the breakfast broadcaster over to the regional ITV stations, but for the first few months on air, the close time was 9.15 as the switching process had not yet been converted fully for the broadcast of breakfast television. Today this transition is seamless, though the 9.25 anomaly remained until 2020. TV-am launched as a serious news programme on 1 February 1983. However, it changed its format soon after to attempt to copy the success of the BBC's Breakfast Time.

Channel 4 had launched on 2 November 1982. Originally it depended on the ITV network for its funding, with the regional companies selling advertising. This arrangement ended on 31 December 1992 after which a 'funding formula' continued, whereby the ITV companies would subsidise Channel 4 if it fell into the red. However, it never did, and the funding formula was withdrawn in 1998. During this 16-year period, Channel 4 and ITV would regularly cross-promote each other's programming, free of charge. Another expansion came on 14 September 1987, when ITV Schools programming was transferred to Channel 4 (and S4C), freeing up a large section of the daytime schedule for new shows. This expansion in programming, and in advertising time, helped give the stations a boost.

By 1986 demand for television advertising was so high that ITV income had grown at twice the rate of inflation over the previous ten years. Spending for TV ads grew 10.5% annually in real terms over the period according to Saatchi & Saatchi, compared to 7.5% for all advertising.

1987 saw the companies beginning to move into night-time broadcasting. This began with individual efforts by individual companies, primarily the 'Big Five' (Thames Television, LWT, Central Independent Television, Granada Television and Yorkshire Television), before collaborative efforts resulted in the whole network operating 24 hours a day by the autumn of 1988. Notable efforts included Granada Television's Night Time (which also went out to Tyne Tees Television, TSW, Border Television, Grampian Television and Ulster Television), LWT's Night Network (which also went out to Anglia Television), TVS' Late Night Late (which also went out to Channel Television) and HTV's Night Club; later efforts included ITV Night Time from Thames Television and LWT (which also went out to TVS, HTV, Anglia Television and Channel Television) and Night Shift from Yorkshire Television and Tyne Tees Television.

From 1 January 1988, each programme on ITV was no longer preceded by the identifier of the regional company that had produced the show. Another new venture was the ITV Telethon. This biennial routine event held in 1988, 1990 and 1992 saw the regional companies and the national network come together to raise money for charity. The 27-hour telethons ended following the change of culture at ITV following the franchise changes in 1993. On 13 February 1989, ITV started broadcasting a national weather forecast for the first time – previously each regional company had aired its own forecast which they had broadcast at the end of their local news programmes and at closedown.

ITV introduced its first official corporate logo and national on-air identity on 1 September 1989; this was an attempt to unify the network under one image while still allowing for regional identity. However, six companies refused to use their versions of the generic ident (Granada Television, TVS, TSW, Anglia Television, Channel Television and Ulster Television), preferring to stick with their distinctive on-screen branding. The companies to use the generic ident for the longest time were Yorkshire Television, who kept it on until 24 October 1994, and Grampian Television, who continued to use it right up until ITV's second corporate logo was introduced on 5 October 1998.

=== Broadcasting Act 1990 ===
When commercial television started in 1954, it was described as "a license to print money", a reputation which has dogged the industry ever since. Mrs Thatcher decided the restrictive working practices and overmanning, for which ITV became notorious, had to end, and she set about a shakeup which culminated in today's auction.

— BBC News, 16 October 1991

Margaret Thatcher's Conservative government spent much of the 1980s privatising and deregulating British industry, and commercial broadcasting was no exception. The Broadcasting Act 1990 paved the way for the deregulation of the British commercial broadcasting industry, which was to have many consequences for the ITV system.

As a result of this act, the Independent Broadcasting Authority was abolished, and replaced by two new 'light-touch' regulators: the Independent Television Commission (ITC) and the Radio Authority. The small Cable Authority was also abolished, its powers transferred to the ITC. The act also changed the system of licence allocation for the franchises now legally known as Channel 3: the previous system where applicants needed to show good programming ideas and fine financial controls was replaced by highest-bidder auctions to determine the winner of each ITV regional franchise. This element of the ITV franchising process was very controversial; the press and the existing ITV companies lobbied to have it changed and the ITC agreed to introduce a 'quality threshold' to prevent high bidders with poor programme plans from joining the system. Another safeguard was the 'business plan' which determined if a bidder could maintain the payments due and still retain money for programme making.

Other changes were also made as part of the act: ITN, the news provider for ITV, was no longer to be exclusively owned by ITV companies. Additionally, Channel 4, which had previously been an independent subsidiary of the IBA, was now to become a government-owned corporation, patterned after the BBC. It would also begin to sell its own advertising – a function previously provided by each ITV company as a return for subsidising the channel.

The Broadcasting Act 1990 also changed the scheduling system. Following lobbying by independent production companies and TVS, the act required that ITV's scheduling be performed by a nominated person independent of the regional companies, and that a 25% threshold of independent production be required. This led to the creation in 1992 of the ITV Network Centre, a central body in charge of the network schedule, with, for the first time, a single ITV Director of Programming.

== 1991–2002 ==
=== 1991 ITV franchise auctions ===
Following the changes laid out in the Broadcasting Act 1990, the franchises for operation from 1 January 1993 were awarded to whichever applicant bid the most money (to be paid on an annual basis), providing they also passed quality and business plan hurdles. In total, there were 45 applicants for the 17 available licences.

- Bidders **in bold** were winners.
- Bidders in italics were the incumbents.

Franchise	Bids
National breakfast service	**Sunrise (later GMTV): £34,610,000**; Daybreak: £33,261,000; TV-am: £14,125,000
Borders and Isle of Man	**Border: £52,000**
Central Scotland	**Scottish: £2,000**
Channel Islands	CI3 Group: £102,000; **Channel TV: £1,000**
East of England	**Anglia: £17,804,000**; Three East: £14,078,000; CPV-TV: £10,125,000
London (weekday)	CPV-TV: £45,319,000; **Carlton: £43,170,000**; Thames: £32,794,000
London (weekend)	London Independent Broadcasting: £35,406,000; **LWT: £7,585,000**
English Midlands	**Central: £2,000**
North of Scotland	North of Scotland TV: £2,709,000; C3 Caledonia: £1,125,000; **Grampian: £720,000**
North East England	**Tyne Tees: £15,057,000**; North East Television: £5,010,000
North West England	North West Television: £35,303,000; **Granada: £9,000,000**
Northern Ireland	TVNI: £3,100,000; Lagan Television: £2,712,000; **Ulster: £1,027,000**
South and South East England	TVS: £59,758,000; **Meridian: £36,523,000**; CPV-TV: £22,105,000; Carlton: £18,080,000
South West England	TSW: £16,117,000; **Westcountry: £7,815,000**; TeleWest: £7,266,000
Wales and West of England	**HTV: £20,530,000**; Merlin: £19,367,000; Channel 3 Wales and West: £18,289,000; C3W: £17,760,000
Yorkshire and Lincolnshire	**Yorkshire: £37,700,000**; Viking: £30,116,000; White Rose: £17,400,000
National teletext service for ITV, Channel 4 and S4C	**Teletext Ltd: £8,200,000**; ORACLE: £6,700,000; TV-am Cable Television: £6,400,000; Carlton/Intelfax: £3,600,000; Update Teletext: £3,600,000

1. ^{Q} Bid rejected on quality grounds
2. ^{F} Bid rejected on financial grounds after meeting the quality threshold

The ITV regions after the major change of contracts in 1993

As a direct result of the franchise bid:

- Thames Television controversially lost the London weekday franchise to **Carlton Television**. However, Thames continued to produce programmes for ITV and other channels, such as The Bill, This Is Your Life, Mr. Bean and Minder.
- TV-am lost the national breakfast television franchise to Sunrise Television, which changed its name to **Good Morning Television** (GMTV) before launch because of a dispute with British Sky Broadcasting over the name 'Sunrise'.
- TVS lost the South and South East England franchise to **Meridian Broadcasting**.
- TSW lost the South West England franchise to **Westcountry Television**.
- ORACLE lost the national teletext franchise to **Teletext Ltd**.

All other existing ITV companies retained their regional franchises. Due to their bids being barred on business plan grounds and therefore deemed 'too high', TSW and TVS attempted to obtain a judicial review of the ITC's decisions, and of the wording of the 1990 Act. Accordingly, the ITC held off awarding the contract to Westcountry Television until the review was completed. As the contract with Meridian Broadcasting had already been agreed, the court felt unable to conduct a review of that decision. The review of the South West franchise process took several months but was decided in favour of the ITC.

The relaxation in the franchise ownership rules, as a result of the 1990 Act, meant that mergers between ITV companies were now possible; this was further enhanced by the passing of the Broadcasting Act 1996, which relaxed the rules even further. As a result, companies began to take each other over to increase efficiencies and to expand.

=== 1993–1997 ===
Year:	92	93	94	96	97	2000	01	04	08	09	11	16
Central				Carlton; Communications				ITV plc				
(Thames)		Carlton		Carlton; Communications				ITV plc				
(TSW)		Westcountry		Carlton; Communications				ITV plc				
HTV								ITV plc				
(TVS)		Meridian		UNM				ITV plc				
Anglia				UNM				ITV plc				
Granada			Granada plc					ITV plc				
LWT			Granada plc					ITV plc				
Yorkshire	YTTTV							ITV plc				
Tyne Tees	YTTTV							ITV plc				
Border						Capital		ITV plc				
(TV-am)		GMTV										
Channel												
UTV												
STV					SMG				STV Group plc			
Grampian					SMG				STV Group plc			
Year:	92	93	94	96	97	2000	01	04	08	09	11	16
Diagram showing the sale of franchisees from company to company to form ITV plc and SMG

In 1992, Yorkshire Television and Tyne Tees Television merged again, creating Yorkshire-Tyne Tees Television plc. The two companies were permitted to merge before their existing arrangements expired in June 1992, due to the marginal nature of both companies' finances, and a need to rationalise the two companies before the franchise handover date. Takeovers began in earnest in 1994, as Carlton Television took over Central Independent Television having held a stake in the company since 1987, Granada plc bought LWT in a hostile bid and MAI, owners of Meridian Broadcasting, took over Anglia Television. As a result of the latter, Anglia Television's presentation and playout facilities were moved to Meridian Broadcasting's base in Southampton. In 1996, Carlton Television bought Westcountry Television and increased its stake in Central Independent Television to 81%. Then, in 1997, Granada Television acquired Yorkshire-Tyne Tees Television and moved the presentation and playout of Granada Television, Yorkshire Television and Tyne Tees Television to The Leeds Studios, while Scottish Media Group (SMG), which owned Scottish Television, acquired Grampian Television and began to consolidate staff at its studio base in Glasgow. Also in 1997, United News and Media, the evolution of MAI and owner of Meridian Broadcasting and Anglia Television, purchased HTV; however, few departments were consolidated.

=== 1998–2002 ===
By 1999, four groups owned the majority of the ITV franchises: Granada plc, Carlton Communications, United News and Media (UNM) and the Scottish Media Group (SMG), with Ulster Television, Channel Television and Border Television remaining independent. From here, the companies further consolidated their channels. On 8 November 1999, a new, hearts-based on-air look was introduced and adopted by the Granada Television and UNM regions, along with Border Television and Channel Television. This look reduced regional identity to a design at the conclusion of the ident: the majority of the ident was generic to all the stations. Two months before, on 6 September 1999, Carlton Television dropped the Central Independent Television and Westcountry Television names from their on-air presentation, instead branding these regions as Carlton Television, and using the same presentation for all three regions. In the summer of 2000, following an unsuccessful attempt to merge with Carlton Television, UNM sold its three stations – Meridian Broadcasting, Anglia Television and HTV – to Granada Television. However, Granada Television had to sell the broadcasting arm of HTV to Carlton Television to comply with the then-current regulatory requirements. In July 2001, Granada Television acquired Border Television from Capital Radio Group and moved presentation and play-out facilities to Leeds.

In addition to franchise mergers, in 1998 the Independent Television Association and Network Centre formally merged, becoming "ITV Network Limited". At the same time, a new lower-case ITV network logo was introduced at the same time for use around the network and includes the tagline: "TV from the heart (of life)". The new logo design was meant to appear friendlier to the viewer.

Throughout this period, the ITV companies sought to expand into the new multi-channel environment forming in the United Kingdom. On 1 October 1996, Granada Television launched four services through a joint venture with BSkyB entitled Granada Sky Broadcasting. These four channels – Granada Plus, Granada Good Life, Granada Men & Motors and Granada Talk TV – were respectively focused on repeated entertainment programming from the Granada Television archives, women's lifestyle programming, programming for men and televised interactive debating. Granada Talk TV closed down on 31 August 1997 after only ten months on air due to low viewership, while Granada Good Life rebranded to Granada Breeze on 1 May 1998. In September 1996, Carlton Television launched Carlton Food Network, a cable-only cookery channel, and on 1 November 1996, a joint venture between Scottish Television and BSkyB was launched, entitled Sky Scottish, and aimed mainly at Scots who lived outside Scotland. While Sky Scottish closed on 31 May 1998 due to low viewership, Carlton expanded its channels, launching Carlton Select on 14 February 1997 followed by Carlton Cinema, Carlton Kids and Carlton World on 15 November 1998. However, all but Carlton Cinema closed shortly into the new millennium, mainly due to low viewership and cost-cutting in light of the cost of funding ONdigital.

ITV logo, 1998–2006

Despite these larger companies having launched their own services a few years previously, Granada Television, Carlton Television and UNM collaborated to launch a new service on 7 December 1998: ITV2. The new channel expanded network ITV programmes and launched on multiple services, giving additional appeal to the style of ITV itself in light of new competition from channels operating on satellite, cable and more recently digital terrestrial television. However, ITV2 only launched in England and Wales, leaving SMG, Ulster Television and Channel Television to use the multiplex space in their respective regions to whatever purpose they saw fit. As a result, SMG launched S2 on 30 April 1999 and Ulster Television launched TV You (later UTV2) on 28 June 1999, both offering similar programming tailored for their region. By 22 January 2002, however, both channels had ceased and were replaced by ITV2 itself.

On 1 August 2000, ITN, the news producer for the ITV Network, launched the ITN News Channel in a joint venture with NTL (now Virgin Media), which provided rolling news on cable, satellite and digital terrestrial. Following the increase in ITV-branded channels and services, including ITV2 and ITV Digital, the decision was taken by Carlton Television and Granada Television to rename the ITV Network in their regions as ITV1 on 11 August 2001.

Another venture initiated by Carlton Television and Granada Television was jointly bidding for the newly created DTT licence. The companies jointly bid with BSkyB for the licence under the company name British Digital Broadcasting and won; however, BSkyB was forced to withdraw following competition laws. Carlton Television and Granada Television launched the service on 15 November 1998 as ONdigital and ran the service that housed other free-to-air channels. However, BSkyB had launched its own service, Sky Digital, the previous month and following a heavy promotional campaign by Sky, which compared the Sky Digital service to ONdigital's service and always to Sky's benefit, ONdigital started making heavy losses. In a resort to keep the venture afloat, Carlton Television and Granada Television used the name of ITV to boost the success of the company. The newly named ITV Digital launched on 11 July 2001, complete with a major advertising campaign featuring Al (played by Johnny Vegas) and Monkey (voiced by Ben Miller), and an exclusive deal to air the Football League on the newly created ITV Sport Channel. However, the venture was still not bringing the results required and ITV Digital went into administration on 27 March 2002, left crippled by the burden of its £315 million contract with the Football League, with the ITV Sport Channel closing two months later. This led to criticism of Carlton Television and Granada Television from SMG, Ulster Television and Channel Television which objected to the ITV name being reduced following the collapse of the service, whilst several football clubs that were covered in the Football League deal were faced with financial difficulties for many years afterwards.

== 2002–present ==
=== 2002–2005 ===
The on-air branding of the ITV regions in 2002

From 2002, the ITV network began to consolidate again. On 28 October 2002, the Carlton Television and Granada Television regions adopted a new presentation package featuring the network's celebrities, which resulted in the regions becoming known as ITV1 at all times, the region names only appearing prior to regional programmes. This look also marked the centralisation of continuity in the Carlton Television and Granada Television regions to London, with the exception of Wales.

The pinnacle of ITV's consolidation was the merger of Carlton Communications and Granada plc in 2004. The two companies had previously tried to merge twice before in the 1990s; however, the government and competition laws prevented this from occurring. But on 21 October 2003, the government announced that it would no longer prevent a merger from taking place, subject to safeguards being set in place to ensure the continued independence of SMG, Ulster Television and Channel Television. Carlton Television and Granada Television finally merged at the end of January 2004, with Granada Television shareholders owning 68% of the new company, ITV plc, and Carlton Television shareholders owning the remaining 32%. ITV plc was floated on the London Stock Exchange under the symbol 'ITV' on 2 February 2004. The new company owned all the ITV regions in England, Wales and the Scottish Borders. The choice of the name "ITV plc" was controversial, since it could imply that the company ran the entire network, and an agreement had to be reached with SMG, Ulster Television and Channel Television before the name could be used.

The day of the merger was marked by significant changes throughout the ITV plc regions. All of the ITV plc regional news programmes received a new look in line with the national ITV News bulletins and the regional company logos were replaced officially with an ITV logo followed by the company name below – these began to appear on production captions and as part of other branded output, such as weather summaries. As a result of the merger, ITV plc was faced with a surplus of facilities it no longer needed. Studio and production facilities were replicated many times over, many of which were becoming costly to maintain due to age and difficult to justify following technological advancements. As a result, regional news moved into smaller offices and studio facilities were sold off. ITV Anglia's separate studio facility was sold off as an independent studio, as was ITV Wales & West's main studio in Cardiff. However, ITV Tyne Tees' Newcastle studios and ITV Meridian's Southampton studio complex were closed completely and demolished, both broadcasters moving to smaller regional news bureaux. The reduction in the size of the organisation and in the number of transmission centres resulted in a large number of job cuts.

ITV plc reviewed its digital channel portfolio. In June 2002, Carlton Television and Granada Television jointly bought the ITN News Channel from ITN, renaming it the ITV News Channel three months later (although the service was still produced by ITN). On 31 March 2003, the final Carlton-owned channel, Carlton Cinema, closed; the channel had been struggling ever since the failure of ITV Digital. Following the success of ITV2, compared to the Granada and Carlton-branded channels, a further channel – ITV3 – was launched on 1 November 2004. The channel replaced Granada Plus and aired archive programmes, notably drama. On 1 November 2005, ITV plc launched another new channel aimed specifically at men: ITV4. This channel became notable for airing programmes such as classic 1960s ITC Entertainment series and alternative sports such as the British Touring Car Championship. The new channel featured a new-look ITV logo, which was officially rolled out across the network on 16 January 2006. The new look was more coherent than previous looks, and was also voluntarily adopted by Channel Television. 2006 also saw the launch of the CITV channel, which used the airspace previously used by the ITV News Channel which had closed down on 23 December 2005, and of the participation television channel ITV Play, which turned out to be controversial and closed down the following year.

ITV plc began to look at high-definition television on 9 June 2006, when it launched an experimental channel, ITV HD, primarily for airing the 2006 FIFA World Cup (to which ITV held the rights) and classic films. ITV HD was launched as a permanent channel in June 2008, showing its own schedule of programmes in HD acquired by ITV plc as well as live football matches. The channel re-branded as ITV1 HD in December 2009, before becoming a full simulcast of ITV1 on 2 April 2010. The launch of the simulcast service saw the end of the last Granada channel, Men & Motors, which was closed down on 1 April 2010 to make room for ITV1 HD on other platforms. On 7 October 2010, ITV plc launched ITV2 HD, an HD simulcast of ITV2, followed on 15 November by ITV3 HD and ITV4 HD. All three of these channels were initially only available on the Sky platform.

In June 2005, Ofcom, the channel's regulator since the demise of the Independent Television Commission at the end of 2003, announced huge reductions in the licence fees payable by the Channel 3 contractors (and Five). This move reflected the significant shift towards digital viewing in the UK, and the British government's desire to switch off analogue television signals altogether by 2012. Licence fees fell further as the shift to digital continued. Ofcom also significantly relaxed most of the remaining public service requirements on the ITV contractors; regional non-news output was a significant casualty of these cutbacks, with most regions now broadcasting no more than two hours a week in this category. An experimental internet service, ITV Local, attempted to unite regional content through an on-line user experience that combined regional news, local programming and other features.

==== ITV 50 ====
ITV 50's logo, used between 10 September and 3 October 2005

In September 2005, the ITV network celebrated its 50th anniversary with a season of ITV 50 programming that was run on the network, including a run down of ITV's 50 top programmes, a World of Sport retrospective, a seven-week Gameshow Marathon presented by Ant & Dec, the launch of an "Avenue of the Stars", and most notably a five-part documentary series made by Melvyn Bragg, which chronicled ITV's history.

The Royal Mail issued special ITV 50 postage stamps, and the regional companies owned by ITV plc also aired special regional retrospectives (even though none of them were themselves 50 years old), as well as using special ITV 50 station identification. While Scottish, Grampian and UTV aired the network ITV 50 programming they did not themselves air regional programmes of this sort, nor did they use the special identification. ITN also celebrated its 50th anniversary with special features in its programming.

ITV logo, 2006–2013

=== 2006–2011 ===
In March 2006, SMG plc announced that Scottish Television and Grampian Television were to be rebranded as STV, making Grampian the latest ITV region to lose its own regional identity. The STV brand, which works similarly to the ITV brand in England and Wales, had previously been used by Scottish Television between 1969 and 1985.

In September 2007, the then chairman of ITV plc, Michael Grade, announced huge cost-cutting plans for the company which would see the number of regional news programmes cut from seventeen to nine. These plans saw many mergers of news programmes, including the respective mergers of the programmes in the two remaining Central sub-regions (East and West), the programmes in the two Anglia sub-regions (East and West) and the programmes in the two Yorkshire sub-regions (North and South) into one programme for each region. Most controversial, however, were the merger proposals which covered two regions. These included the respective mergers of the programmes in the West and Westcountry regions into one programme from Bristol, the programmes in the two Meridian sub-regions (South and South East) and the Thames Valley region into one programme from Whiteley, and the programmes in the two Tyne Tees sub-regions (North and South) and the Border region into one programme from Gateshead. The new arrangement resulted in pre-recorded opt-out segments in the main programme for some regions where regional news was mandatory, such as Meridian South and South East, and where a programme crossed regional boundaries, such as Tyne Tees and Border. These changes took effect from February 2009, when Meridian began its pan-regional service. The plans also saw the end of the ITV Local online initiative, as the regional cuts affected the service hard; the service closed down in March 2009.

In November 2008, the operating licences of all the ITV plc regions were transferred to a new company, ITV Broadcasting Ltd. This essentially leaves one company producing and broadcasting programmes to the ITV regions in England and Wales.

In November 2009, ITV plc gained full control of the breakfast broadcaster, GMTV, when it bought the 25% stake from The Walt Disney Company for £18 million. ITV subsequently announced that GMTV would be closed and replaced with two new programmes in September 2010: Daybreak, a news and features programme, and Lorraine, named after presenter Lorraine Kelly and providing a platform for female debate. The official name of the company itself was changed to ITV Breakfast Ltd.

In the autumn of 2011, another step was taken towards the full unification of the ITV Network when ITV plc bought Channel Television.

=== 2013 rebranding ===
On-air branding of the ITV regions in 2013.

The fully ITV-branded franchises since 2014

(UTV adopted ITV continuity in 2020 but continues to use the UTV brand on local programming. The ITV brand was replaced by ITV1 in 2022.)

On 15 November 2012, an overhaul of the network was announced, which involved the rebranding of ITV1 back to ITV and the introduction of a new colour-changing logo stylised as handwriting, the colours varying depending on the programming the logo was used on. The overhaul was linked to ITV's attempt to cut costs, curb debts and reduce the company's reliance on advertising. The new look was rolled out across all of ITV plc's channels and online services on 14 January 2013.

=== ITV licence renewal for 2014 ===
According to The Guardian, ITV will increase regional news programmes in England and Wales from nine (in 2009) back to seventeen in the future. Culture Secretary Maria Miller suggested talks about the future of ITV regional news in the south of Scotland. A possible new ITV franchise for Wales could be introduced, which would replace the Wales and West of England franchise, currently awarded to ITV Wales & West (formerly HTV). This is part of ITV's and Channel 5's franchise renewal for the next ten years which will expire in 2024.

=== The takeover of UTV ===
On 19 October 2015, it was announced that ITV plc would purchase UTV Media's TV interests for £100 million, subject to regulatory approval. Unlike other franchises owned by ITV, UTV would retain its brand name. The sale was finalised with ITV taking control of UTV on 29 February 2016. In 2020, UTV continuity was replaced by ITV continuity, although the UTV brand continues to be used for regional programming.

=== 2022 rebranding ===
On 15 November 2022, the ITV channel in all ITV plc-owned regions, then known as ITV, rebranded back to ITV1, the former name for the channel between 2001 and 2013, alongside introducing a new presentation package and logo used across ITV1, ITV2, ITV3, ITV4 and ITVBe, thus unifying ITV's main channels. This move was done in advance before the 8 December launch of ITVX.

=== Closure of CITV channel ===
On 10 March 2023, ITV plc announced that it would close the CITV channel in the autumn, with a phased migration of ITV's children's programming moving to ITVX Kids set to launch on 22 July, on its streaming service ITVX.

ITVX launched the ITVX Kids FAST channel on 12 July 2023.

All of CITV's promos were replaced by ITVX promos on 1 September 2023. It then ceased broadcasting at 9:00pm. The last programme to air on the channel was an episode of The Rubbish World of Dave Spud titled ‘Moonbreaker’. The channel then closed shortly afterwards with a loop informing its viewers that its content could now be seen on ITVX.

On 2 September 2023, the morning after the closure of the CITV channel, ITV2 launched a new breakfast time block from 5am to 9am everyday with shows featured on ITVX Kids on ITVX. Until 2026, this block retains the CITV branding. The new children's strand replaces teleshopping and re-runs of shows including World's Funniest Videos and Love Bites. Children's shows featured on the new breakfast time block include Jurassic World Camp Cretaceous and Scooby-Doo.

== List of former ITV franchise holders ==
- ABC Weekend TV (Associated British Cinemas (Television)): North and Midlands weekend franchise (1956–1968)
- Associated-Rediffusion: London weekday franchise (22 September 1955 – 29 July 1968)
- ATV (Associated Television): Midlands weekday franchise and London weekend franchise (1956–1968); Midlands (7 day) (1968–1981)
- Southern Television: South and South East England franchise (1958–1981)
- Thames Television: London weekday franchise (30 July 1968 – 31 December 1992)
- TSW (Television South West): South West England franchise (1 January 1982 – 31 December 1992)
- TVS (Television South): South and South East England franchise (1 January 1982 – 31 December 1992)
- TWW (Television Wales and the West): Wales and West of England franchise (1958–1968). See also ITSWW (March–May 1968)
- Westward Television: South West England franchise (1961–1981)
- WWN (Wales West and North Television): West and North Wales franchise (1962–1964)
- TV-am: National breakfast television franchise (1983–1992)
- ORACLE: National teletext franchise (1977–1992)

== Timeline ==
History of ITV regions, franchises and on-air branding
Region		1950s					1960s										1970s										1980s										1990s										2000s										2010s										2020s
Region		5	6	7	8	9	0	1	2	3	4	5	6	7	8	9	0	1	2	3	4	5	6	7	8	9	0	1	2	3	4	5	6	7	8	9	0	1	2	3	4	5	6	7	8	9	0	1	2	3	4	5	6	7	8	9	0	1	2	3	4	5	6	7	8	9	0	1	2	3	4	5	6
Northern Scotland								Grampian / Grampian Television / Grampian TV																																													STV
Central Scotland				Scottish Television / STV / Scottish TV																																																	STV
Northern Ireland						Ulster Television / UTV																																																										UTV			ITV		ITV1
South Scotland, Cumbria, Isle of Man								Border Television / Border																																									ITV1											ITV									ITV1
North East England						Tyne Tees Television / North East 3																																											ITV1											ITV									ITV1
North West England			Granada (weekday); ABC (North) (weekend)												Granada																																		ITV1											ITV									ITV1
Yorkshire			Granada (weekday); ABC (North) (weekend)												Yorkshire Television						Yorkshire Television																												ITV1											ITV									ITV1
East Riding of Yorkshire, Lincolnshire						Anglia															Yorkshire Television																												ITV1											ITV									ITV1
East of England						Anglia															Anglia																												ITV1											ITV									ITV1
North and West Wales									Teledu Cymru (WWN)		Teledu Cymru (TWW) / ITSTC				HTV Cymru Wales / HTV Wales																									HTV									ITV1											ITV									ITV1
South Wales					TWW / ITSWW										HTV Cymru Wales / HTV Wales																									HTV									ITV1											ITV									ITV1
West of England					TWW / ITSWW										HTV West																									HTV									ITV1											ITV									ITV1
Midlands	(weekday)		ATV Midlands												ATV														Central / Carlton (Central)																				ITV1											ITV									ITV1
Midlands	(weekend)		ABC (Midlands)												ATV														Central / Carlton (Central)																				ITV1											ITV									ITV1
South West England								Westward Television																					TSW											Westcountry / Carlton (Westcountry)									ITV1											ITV									ITV1
London	(weekday)	Associated-Rediffusion / Rediffusion London													Thames																									Carlton									ITV1											ITV									ITV1
London	(weekend)	ATV London													London Weekend / LWT																																		ITV1											ITV									ITV1
South and South East England					Southern																								TVS											Meridian									ITV1											ITV									ITV1
Channel Islands									Channel Television / CTV / Channel																																																			ITV									ITV1
National breakfast franchise																														TV-am										GMTV																ITV Breakfast
National teletext franchise																									ORACLE															Teletext
National news franchise		(ITN, not franchised)																																						ITN

=== The Big Four/Five ===
The largest ITV companies were known as the "Big Four" before 1968 and the "Big Five" after. These companies between them provided the vast majority of networked programmes (either by producing them in-house, or commissioning them from independent production companies), and were members of the network's influential Network Planning Committee. The regional, non-"Big" ITV companies, excluded from the committee, created the British Regional Television Association to cooperate.

The "Big Five" system effectively came to an end in 1992 with the introduction of the ITV Network Centre (as a result of the Broadcasting Act 1990), which changed the methods of commissioning for the network, and made it easier for the smaller ITV companies and independent companies to make shows for the network:

"Big Four"			"Big Five"	
1955–1968			1968–1981	1982–1992
Granada	◀ North (weekdays)	North West ▶	Granada	
ABC	◀ North (weekends)	Yorkshire ▶	Yorkshire Television	
ABC	◀ Midlands (weekends)	Midlands ▶	ATV	Central
ATV	◀ Midlands (weekdays)	Midlands ▶	ATV	Central
ATV	◀ London (weekends) ▶		London Weekend Television (LWT)	
Associated-Rediffusion	◀ London (weekdays) ▶		Thames	

== Slogans ==
- "Welcome home to ITV" (1979 after industrial dispute)
- "Get Ready for ITV" (1989)
- "Television from the heart (of life)." (1998–2001)
- "Britain's favourite button." (1990s)
- "The brighter side." (2009–2013) (ITV1)
- "The brighter side just got brighter!" (2010–2013) (ITV1 HD)
- "Come on in." (2013–2019) (ITV)
- "More than TV." (2019–2022) (ITV)
- "There's no place like ITV!" (2026–present) (ITV1)

== See also ==
- History of ITV television idents
- Timeline of ITV
- Timeline of ITV Digital Channels
- Timelines of:
  - ABC
  - Anglia
  - ATV
  - Border
  - Carlton
  - Central
  - Channel
  - Grampian
  - Granada
  - HTV West
  - ITV in Wales
  - LWT
  - Meridian
  - STV
  - Southern
  - Thames & Associated-Rediffusion
  - TSW & Westward
  - TV-am
  - TVS
  - Tyne Tees
  - UTV
  - Westcountry
  - Yorkshire
- List of ITV regions § History

== Sources ==
=== Notes ===
1. ^a Colour television in the Channel Islands commenced for the first time on 26 July 1976, delays were cost of upgrading the studios due to the technical difficulties which provide several UHF links from the mainland between United Kingdom (PAL) and France (SECAM); a special receiving antenna called "Steerable Adaptive Broadcast Reception Equipment" – or "SABRE" for short – specially designed and developed by the IBA engineers was installed at Alderney and beamed over-the-air signal in Jersey.
2. ^b The Muppet Show was not broadcast on Westward or Channel Television, both instead opting to show their local news.
3. ^c The 'quality threshold' was a subjective evaluation by the ITC of the application submitted with the bid. The 'threshold' worked in one direction – high bidders could be disqualified for not reaching it, but low bidders could not be 'promoted' for having passed it. The ITC did not announce if the lower bidders had passed the threshold or not.
4. ^d CPV-TV was a consortium led by David Frost and Richard Branson. It bid for the East, London weekday and South franchises, aiming to offer a centralised single service.
5. ^e The ITC at first considered failing the Tyne Tees Television bid, on business plan grounds.
6. ^f North East was backed financially by Granada Television.
7. ^g North West Television was a consortium led by Phil Redmond of the independent producer Mersey Television, and backed financially by Yorkshire Television and Tyne Tees Television.
8. ^h The 'business plan' test was a subjective evaluation by the ITC of the business plan submitted with each bid. The evaluation tested whether the bidder could afford its programme plans and also, more importantly, afford to pay the amount it had bid. The ITC did not announce if the lower bidders had passed the business plan evaluation.
9. ^i TVS sought a judicial review of this decision, but the High Court decided it could not look into the matter as the ITC had already awarded the contract to Meridian Broadcasting.
10. ^j TSW sought a judicial review of this decision. The ITC held off from awarding the contract to Westcountry Television until the High Court had ruled. After four months, the High Court ruled that the ITC had no case to answer, and ITC confirmed the award of the contract to Westcountry.
11. ^k The ITC at first considered failing the HTV bid on business plan grounds.
12. ^l The ITC at first considered failing the Yorkshire Television bid on business plan grounds.
