= TVTimes =

British television listings magazine devoted to soaps, celebrities and features

TV Times
- Cover of 7–13 December 2024 issue, featuring All Creatures Great and Small
- Editor: Claire Ruck
- Categories: TV listings magazine
- Frequency: Weekly
- Circulation: 197,153 (ABC Jan – Jun 2016) (Print and digital editions)
- First issue: 22 September 1955
- Company: Associated Rediffusion (1955–1959); TV Publications Ltd (1959–1968); Independent Television Publications (1968–1989); TI Media (formerly IPC Media and Time Inc. UK) (1989–2020); Future plc (2020–present)
- Country: United Kingdom
- Based in: London
- Language: British English
- Website: www.whatsontv.co.uk/tv-times/
- ISSN: 0962-1660

TV Times is a British television listings magazine. From 1955 until 1991, it was the only source of seven-day listings for ITV and, from 1982, Channel 4 (as well as S4C in Wales in an enclosed local supplement titled Sbec). The magazine did not circulate nationally until 1968 as some (usually smaller) regional stations opted to produce their own listings publications. Until the market was deregulated, its nearest rival was Radio Times – owned then by the BBC and at the time the only source of weekly BBC television and radio schedules. However the two magazines were very different in character, and viewers wanting the full listings for the coming week were required to purchase both publications. The TV Times branding was also used for several broadcast spin-offs on ITV, including the Miss TV Times and The TV Times Awards during the 1970s and 1980s.

Previously published by Independent Television Publications, owned by the participating ITV companies, the magazine was acquired by IPC Media in 1989, which became Time Inc. UK in 2014 and then TI Media in 2018. It was acquired by Future plc in 2020.

== History and profile ==
TV Times was launched on 22 September 1955, with the start of transmissions of the first ITV station, Associated-Rediffusion. Initially, the magazine was published only in the London area, carrying listings for Associated-Rediffusion (Rediffusion, London from 1964) on weekdays and ATV at weekends, but regional editions began to appear covering those ITV regional companies which did not opt to establish their own listings magazines. TV Times became a national magazine (except for the Channel Islands) from 21 September 1968.

During the late 1950s until the early 1980s, TV Times suffered frequent printing disputes that often resulted in the publication of emergency or special combined editions.

The magazine was branded as TV Times Magazine from 3 October 1981 until 6 October 1984, the premise being it contained more than simply television listings. From November 1982 onwards, it carried listings for Channel 4 and its Welsh equivalent, S4C. On 7 October 1989, the programme schedule pages were printed in full colour for the first time. When the television listings were deregulated on 1 March 1991, TV Times began carrying listings for the BBC's television channels and radio stations which, up to that point, had only been printed in the BBC's official listings magazine, Radio Times. On 11 February 2006, the magazine was refreshed for a more modern look including the double-page highlights of programmes on all channels as well as radio and kids' television listings were scrapped, increasing the publication's emphasis on big-star interviews and soaps.

On 15 March 2022, the television listings were given a refreshed layout which is similar to Radio Times, TV & Satellite Week and What's on TV. The changes included a return of radio schedules to the magazine after a 16-year absence.

=== TV Times Awards ===
The awards are held annually to celebrate best in British television as nominations and winners are entirely chosen by its readers.

== Regional editions ==
Until 21 September 1968, several of the regional ITV companies produced their own listings magazines:

Magazine name	ITV region	Publisher
TV Times	Associated-Rediffusion • ATV London (until 1968); Granada • ABC North (until 1968); Southern Television; Anglia Television; Border Television; Grampian Television; Scottish Television (from 25 September 1965); Granada Television (from 29 July 1968); Yorkshire Television (from 29 July 1968); Thames • LWT (from 30 July 1968)	TV Publications Ltd
TV Guide	Scottish Television (until 4 May 1962)	The Scotsman Publications Ltd
Television Weekly	TWW • Teledu Cymru (27 January 1964 – 3 March 1968); ITSWW (4 March 1968 – 19 May 1968); Harlech Television (from 20 May 1968)	Berrows Newspapers Ltd
Wales TV (English); Teledu Cymru (Welsh)	Wales West and North Television (14 September 1962 – 26 January 1964)	Wales (West and North) Publications Ltd
TV World	ATV Midlands • ABC Midlands (27 September 1964 – 28 July 1968); ATV (from 29 July 1968)	Aston Publications Ltd
The Viewer	Tyne Tees Television; Scottish Television (5 May 1962 – 24 September 1965)	News Chronicle/Dickens Press Ltd
Look Westward	Westward Television	News Chronicle/Dickens Press Ltd
TV Post	Ulster Television	Century Newspapers Ltd
Channel Viewer	Channel Television	Channel Islands Communications Ltd

On 1 March 1991, TV Times published BBC One and BBC Two programme listings for the first time, which also mirrored the 11 regional editions generally referred to by the ITV company's name, rather than geographical area:

Region	BBC TV	ITV
London	BBC South East	Thames • LWT (until 31 December 1992); Carlton • LWT (from 1 January 1993)
East of England	BBC East	Anglia Television
Midlands	BBC West Midlands; BBC East Midlands	Central Independent Television
South/South East England (includes Channel Islands from 26 October 1991)	BBC South; BBC South East	TVS • Channel TV (until 31 December 1992); Meridian • Channel TV (from 1 January 1993)
South West England	BBC South West	TSW (until 31 December 1992); Westcountry (from 1 January 1993)
Wales/West of England (with S4C)	BBC Wales; BBC West	HTV
North West England	BBC North West	Granada Television
Yorkshire/Lincolnshire	BBC North	Yorkshire Television
North East England (includes English-Scottish border)	BBC North East	Tyne Tees Television; Border Television
Central/Northern Scotland	BBC Scotland	Scottish Television; Grampian Television
Northern Ireland (with RTÉ One and Network 2)	BBC Northern Ireland	Ulster Television

The ten regional editions in England had ended by September 2005, and since then there have been only four editions:

Region	Channels
England	All 13 BBC and 10 ITV regions in England, the Isle of Man and the Channel Islands
Wales	BBC Wales; ITV Wales; S4C
Scotland	BBC Scotland; STV; ITV Border
Northern Ireland	BBC Northern Ireland; UTV; RTÉ One; RTÉ Two; TV3 (later Virgin Media One)

=== TV Guide ===
TV Guide is a television listings newspaper for Scottish Television programmes was published by The Scotsman Publications Ltd (owned by Roy Thomson) on 29 August 1957. The circulation began at 75,000, rising to 255,000 by October 1958. By February 1959, it had reached 300,000 – four times what the original circulation 17 months prior.

In October 1961, TV Guide compared itself that conclude its readers got "a far better bargain than do the readers of any of the other programme papers in Great Britain and Northern Ireland" – with three times as much information as viewers in North East England, twice as much as Northern Ireland and Wales, even when the TV Times put out an enlarged Grampian issue still gave a better overall service than their best special effort.

An arrangement was made between The Scotsman Publications Ltd and the Daily News Ltd for the printing of TV Guide in a new magazine size and format. The new easy-to-handle publication was printed in magazine style by the photogravure process, bringing clearer, brighter pictures and print, with stitched pages to ensure longer life. It appeared under a new title called The Viewer (incorporating TV Guide) on 5 May 1962.

=== The Viewer / Look Westward ===
The Viewer was a television listings magazine in the North East England which covered the Tyne Tees area, first published on 17 January 1959 by News Chronicle (later taken over by Dickens Press Ltd in 1963) as the official programme journal and registered at the General Post Office as a newspaper. It also published a version of The Viewer in the Central Scotland which covered the area of Scottish Television; and Look Westward in the South West England, with all the programmes for Westward Television.

The final edition of The Viewer for Central Scotland was published on 18 September 1965, the contract to publish STV listings had come to an end and they decided not to renew it; all the ITV programmes were published in an edition of TV Times from the following week. Three years later, Tyne Tees and Westward both published its final edition on 14 September 1968, shortly before TV Times became a national magazine for the first time from 21 September of that year.

=== Channel Viewer / CTV Times ===
Channel Television published its own listings magazine Channel Viewer on 1 September 1962, followed by a relaunch as Channel Television Times in 1971 and then later shortened to CTV Times until 25 October 1991 as it was feared that the company might cease trading without the revenue from its own magazine. It is the only locally produced magazine that is sold in the Channel Islands and many copies are also sent to viewers on the nearby French coast.

=== TV World ===
From 1956 to 1964, the Midlands originally had their own edition of TV Times listing ATV and ABC programmes. A separate listings magazine called TV World was published by Aston Publications Ltd (backed by Odhams Press) from 27 September 1964, with the innovative idea of splitting itself 50:50 with a second cover in the middle allowing for the magazine to be folded over to create both a weekend and a weekday section from one publication. TV Times went national (except for the Channel Islands) from 21 September 1968.

=== Sbec ===
S4C launched its own pull-out weekly listings supplement magazine Sbec on 1 November 1982, distributed free with the Wales edition of TV Times. It contained full details of schedules in both Welsh and English. Channel 4's programmes were also included.

== See also ==
- Look-in
