= List of ITV regions =

The ITV television network of the United Kingdom is divided into a number of geographical regions.

Since 2002, all regions share the same programming except for regional news, weather, advertising and some local political content. Before then, the regions were independent stations, each with its own schedule and branding.

== Current regions ==
Map of the sub-regions, coded to the list below

The table below lists the current 14 regions and 23 sub-regions for ITV and its two associated channels, the timeshifted ITV +1 and the high-definition ITV HD.

While the main SD channels (ITV1, UTV, and STV) on the Freeview platform provide a service for all 23 sub-regions, some sub-regional services are not available on some of the other channels and platforms, and another service is substituted instead, as indicated in the table.

Most Freeview transmitter areas overlap to some extent, so ITV regional services can often be received beyond the service areas indicated. Regional and sub-regional news and weather coverage may extend to include overlap areas.

The other ITV channels such as ITV2, ITV3 and ITV4, are not divided into regions, and each broadcasts a single service across the country.

Map ref	Freeview			Satellite		Virgin Media		Service area
Map ref	SD	+1	HD	HD (Note: SD satellite transmissions (except for two STV regions) ceased in October 2024: Thornham, Marc (13 September 2024). "ITV ends broadcasts to older Sky and Freesat receivers". RXTV.)	+1	HD/SD	+1	Service area
1e	ITV Anglia (East)	Anglia (East)	Meridian (East)	Anglia (East)	Meridian (East)	Anglia (East)	Meridian (East)	Norfolk, Suffolk, eastern and northern Essex
1w	ITV Anglia (West)	Anglia (East)	Meridian (East)	Anglia (West)	Meridian (East)	Anglia (West)	Meridian (East)	Cambridgeshire, most of Northamptonshire, Bedfordshire, north Hertfordshire, northeastern Buckinghamshire (including Milton Keynes) and southeastern fringes of Lincolnshire and Leicestershire
2e	ITV Border (England)	Granada	Granada	Border (England)	Granada	Border (England)	Granada	Central and northern Cumbria
2s	ITV Border (Scotland)	Granada	Granada	Border (Scotland)	Granada	N/A (Note: Virgin Media is not available in the Border (Scotland), Channel or STV (Aberdeen and the North) regions)	N/A	Dumfries and Galloway and Scottish Borders
3e	ITV Central (East Midlands)	Central (West Midlands)	Central (West Midlands)	Central (East Midlands)	Central (West Midlands)	Central (East Midlands)	Central (West Midlands)	Leicestershire, central and southern Derbyshire, southern Nottinghamshire, Rutland and southwestern Lincolnshire
3w	ITV Central (West Midlands)	Central (West Midlands)	Central (West Midlands)	Central (West Midlands)	Central (West Midlands)	Central (West Midlands)	Central (West Midlands)	Herefordshire, Shropshire, Staffordshire, Warwickshire, the West Midlands, Worcestershire and northern Gloucestershire
▼4	ITV Channel	—N/a	—N/a	Channel	—N/a	N/A	N/A	Channel Islands
5	ITV Granada	Granada	Granada	Granada	Granada	Granada	Granada	Cheshire, Greater Manchester, Lancashire, Merseyside, northwestern Derbyshire, south Cumbria, western North Yorkshire and Isle of Man
6	ITV London	London	London	London	London	London	London	Greater London, southern and western Essex, north western Kent, north eastern West Sussex, Surrey, eastern Berkshire, southern Bedfordshire, southern Buckinghamshire, and most of Hertfordshire
7e	ITV Meridian (East)	Meridian (East)	Meridian (East)	Meridian (East)	Meridian (East)	Meridian (East)	Meridian (East)	Kent, East Sussex, eastern West Sussex, southeastern Surrey and southern Essex
7s	ITV Meridian (West)	Meridian (East)	Meridian (East)	Meridian (West)	Meridian (East)	Meridian (West)	Meridian (East)	Central and southern Hampshire, West Sussex, Isle of Wight, central and eastern Dorset, and southeastern Wiltshire
7t	ITV Meridian (Thames Valley)	Meridian (East)	Meridian (East)	Meridian (Thames Valley)	Meridian (East)	Meridian (Thames Valley)	Meridian (East)	Oxfordshire, central and northwestern Buckinghamshire, western Berkshire, northern Hampshire, western Surrey, eastern Gloucestershire and southwestern Northamptonshire
8e	STV (Edinburgh & the East)	STV (Glasgow & the West) (Edinburgh evening news opt-out)	STV (Glasgow & the West)	STV (Edinburgh & the East) (only SD on Freesat)	N/A (Note: On Sky, ITV +1 London is on channel 973 in STV regions)	STV (Edinburgh & the East)	STV (Glasgow & the West) (Edinburgh evening news opt-out)	Clackmannanshire, East Lothian, Edinburgh, Fife (except North East Fife), Midlothian and West Lothian
8w	STV (Glasgow & the West)	STV (Glasgow & the West) (Edinburgh evening news opt-out)	STV (Glasgow & the West)	STV (Glasgow & the West)	N/A	STV (Glasgow & the West)	STV (Glasgow & the West) (Edinburgh evening news opt-out)	Argyll and Bute, East Ayrshire, East Dunbartonshire, East Renfrewshire, Falkirk, Glasgow, Inverclyde, Lochaber, North Ayrshire, North Lanarkshire, Renfrewshire, Stirling, South Ayrshire, South Lanarkshire, West Dunbartonshire.
9a	STV (Aberdeen & the North)	STV (Aberdeen & the North)	STV (Glasgow & the West)	STV (Aberdeen & the North)	N/A	N/A	N/A	Aberdeen, Aberdeenshire, Highland (except Lochaber), Moray, na h-Eileanan Siar, Orkney and Shetland
9d	STV (Dundee & Tayside)	STV (Aberdeen & the North)	STV (Glasgow & the West)	STV (Dundee & Tayside) (only SD on Freesat)	N/A	STV (Dundee & Tayside)	STV (Aberdeen & the North)	Angus, Dundee, North East Fife, Perth and Kinross
10	ITV Tyne Tees	Tyne Tees	Granada	Tyne Tees	Granada	Tyne Tees	Granada	County Durham, Northumberland, Teesside, Tyne and Wear and northern North Yorkshire
11	UTV	UTV	UTV	UTV	ITV Granada	UTV	UTV	Northern Ireland
12	ITV Cymru Wales	Wales	Wales	Wales	Central (West Midlands)	Wales	Central (West Midlands)	Wales
13e	ITV West Country (West) (Note: formerly known as "West Country (east)" and earlier as "West")	West Country (West)	Central (West Midlands)	West Country (West)	Central (West Midlands)	West Country (West)	Central (West Midlands)	Bristol, Forest of Dean, southern Gloucestershire, most of Wiltshire, northern fringes of Dorset and Somerset
13w	ITV West Country (South West) (Note: formerly known as "West Country (west)" and earlier as "Westcountry")	West Country (South West)	Central (West Midlands)	West Country (South West)	Central (West Midlands)	West Country (South West)	Central (West Midlands)	Devon, Cornwall, western Somerset and western Dorset
14e	ITV Yorkshire (South)	Yorkshire (North)	Granada	Yorkshire (South)	Granada	Yorkshire (South)	Granada	East Riding of Yorkshire, most of Lincolnshire, central Nottinghamshire (only Mansfield and Newark), and northwestern Norfolk
14w	ITV Yorkshire (North)	Yorkshire (North)	Granada	Yorkshire (North)	Granada	Yorkshire (North)	Granada	South Yorkshire, West Yorkshire, central and southern North Yorkshire, northeastern Derbyshire and northern Nottinghamshire

== History ==
=== Regional branding 1955–2006 ===
Independent Television began as a franchised network of independently owned regional companies that were both broadcasters and programme makers. Each regional station was responsible for its own branding, scheduling and advertising, with many peak-time programmes shared simultaneously across the whole network. The companies serving London, the Midlands, North West England and Yorkshire (which were the first to start broadcasting in 1955 and 1956) were responsible for making or commissioning the majority of nationally networked programmes; these companies were known as the "Big Four" before 1968 and the "Big Five" afterwards (reflecting the number of companies). Every company made its own regional programmes.

The network began with companies serving London in 1955, and gradually grew until all companies were on air by 1962, and continued to grow as more transmitters were provided for existing companies during the 1960s and 1970s. Over time, some companies lost their franchises and were replaced by others, and the regions covered by some franchises were changed. From 1993, mergers between ITV companies became possible; as a result, companies began to take each other over to increase efficiencies and to expand. By 2004, all of the ITV franchises in England and Wales were owned by the newly formed ITV plc, the four other franchises being Scottish TV, Grampian TV, UTV and Channel.

==== Regional continuity branding ====
The list below indicates the on-air brand names predominantly used by each regional company, which may differ from the official company name or franchise name. Each company used its own branding:

- as station identification in continuity announcements and programme trailers in its own region;
- within its own regional news programmes;
- as production logos on every programme that it made or commissioned (whether for local or national broadcast). (Note: Production logos appeared immediately after programmes ("endcaps") and also, on ITV until 1989, immediately before ("frontcaps").)

Thus companies' brands were often seen by viewers outside their own areas, especially the Big Four/Five brands. From 1989, a national ITV corporate identity was established, which saw regional brands combined with the national ITV brand, although the balance between regional and national brands varied from company to company.

By 2002, all regional companies in England and Wales were owned by either Granada plc or Carlton Communications. These companies carried identical schedules, except for regional news and weather which continued to use joint regional and ITV1 branding. At all other times national ITV1 branding alone was used in England but not Wales. Two years later, Granada and Carlton merged to form ITV plc. Regional branding in England was completely abolished in 2006.

Some regions were divided into sub-regions for the purposes of regional news and advertising, but these sub-regions were not usually identified by on-air branding and consequently are not shown here (with the exception of Wales and the West of England which, after 1964, were managed under a single franchise but are shown as separate regions).

Area	First on air	1955– 1968	1968– 1982	1982– 1992	1993– 2002	2002– 2006 (Note: ITV1 regional names in England were used only before regional programmes)
Northern Scotland	30 September 1961	Grampian		Grampian Television		Grampian TV (Note: From 2000)
Central Scotland	31 August 1957	Scottish Television / STV		Scottish Television		Scottish TV
Northern Ireland	31 October 1959	Ulster Television			UTV	
Channel Islands	1 September 1962	Channel Television	Channel Television / CTV	CTV	Channel	
North East England	15 January 1959	Tyne Tees Television	TTTV / Tyne Tees		TTTV / Tyne Tees / North East 3 (Note: "North East 3" branding (also "Channel 3 North East") was used between 1996 and 1998)	ITV1 Tyne Tees
Southern Scotland, Cumbria, Isle of Man	1 September 1961	Border Television		Border		ITV1 Border
North West England (Note: Area served by "Big Four" or "Big Five" companies)	3 May 1956	Granada (Note: Mondays to Fridays); ABC (North) (Note: Saturdays and Sundays)	Granada			ITV1 Granada
Yorkshire	3 November 1956	Granada; ABC (North)	Yorkshire Television	Yorkshire Television		ITV1 Yorkshire
Lincolnshire, East Riding of Yorkshire	20 December 1965	Anglia	Anglia until 1974	Yorkshire Television		ITV1 Yorkshire
Lincolnshire, East Riding of Yorkshire	20 December 1965	Anglia	Yorkshire Television from 1974	Yorkshire Television		ITV1 Yorkshire
East of England	27 October 1959	Anglia	Anglia			ITV1 Anglia
Midlands	17 February 1956	ATV Midlands; ABC (Midlands)	ATV	Central	Central; Carlton (Central) (Note: Carlton branding replaced Central branding between 1999 and 2003)	ITV1 Carlton; ITV1 for Central England; ITV1 Central (Note: From 2004)
South and South East England	30 August 1958	Southern		TVS	Meridian	ITV1 Meridian
London area	22 September 1955	Associated-Rediffusion / Rediffusion London (Note: Rebranded "Rediffusion London" from 1964); ATV London	Thames (Note: Monday morning to Friday 7 pm); London Weekend / LWT (Note: Fridays from 7 pm, Saturdays and Sundays)	Thames (Note: Monday morning to Friday 5.15 pm (excluding 6 am to 9.25 am daily)); LWT (Note: Fridays from 5.15 pm, Saturdays and Sundays (excluding 6 am to 9.25 am daily))	Carlton; LWT	ITV1 (London)
Wales	14 September 1962	Teledu Cymru from WWN until 1964	Harlech; HTV Cymru Wales	HTV Wales	HTV (Cymru Wales)	ITV1 Wales
Wales	14 September 1962	Teledu Cymru from TWW after 1964 (Note: Temporarily branded as "Independent Television Service Teledu Cymru" for a three-month transitional period in 1968)	Harlech; HTV Cymru Wales	HTV Wales	HTV (Cymru Wales)	ITV1 Wales
South Wales and West of England VHF 405-line only	14 January 1958	TWW (General) (Note: Temporarily branded as "Independent Television Service for South Wales and the West" for a three-month transitional period in 1968)	Harlech; HTV (General)	HTV (General) until 1985	—N/a	
West of England UHF and digital	30 May 1970	—N/a	HTV West		HTV (West)	ITV1 West of England; ITV1 West
South West England	29 April 1961	Westward	Westward TV	TSW	Westcountry; Carlton (Westcountry) (Note: Carlton branding replaced Westcountry branding between 1999 and 2003)	ITV1 Carlton; ITV1 for the Westcountry; ITV1 Westcountry
Nationwide breakfast franchise	1 February 1983	—N/a		TV-am (Note: 6 am to 9.15 am daily)	GMTV (Note: 6 am to 9.25 am daily)	
Nationwide teletext franchise	1978	—N/a	ORACLE		Teletext	

1956, the initial "Big Four" companies

1962, after all companies had begun broadcasting

1965, after Teledu Cymru had been taken over by TWW and its area had been extended

1968, after franchise changes

1974, after minor boundary changes

1982, after franchise changes

1993, after franchise changes

Historical branding in all regions of the ITV network

In the table above coloured highlights denote companies whose broadcasting times were limited:

- blue denotes weekdays only;
- pink denotes weekends only;
- yellow denotes breakfast time only (when all other ITV franchises were off air).

==== Ownership of regional companies ====
Year:	92	93	94	96	97	2000	01	04	08	09	11	16
Central				Carlton; Communications				ITV plc				
(Thames)		Carlton		Carlton; Communications				ITV plc				
(TSW)		Westcountry		Carlton; Communications				ITV plc				
HTV								ITV plc				
(TVS)		Meridian		UNM				ITV plc				
Anglia				UNM				ITV plc				
Granada			Granada plc					ITV plc				
LWT			Granada plc					ITV plc				
Yorkshire	YTTTV							ITV plc				
Tyne Tees	YTTTV							ITV plc				
Border						Capital		ITV plc				
(TV-am)		GMTV										
Channel												
UTV												
STV					SMG				STV Group plc			
Grampian					SMG				STV Group plc			
Year:	92	93	94	96	97	2000	01	04	08	09	11	16
Diagram showing the sale of franchisees from company to company to form ITV plc and SMG

=== National branding from 2002 ===
From 2002, all regional companies in England used national ITV1 branding alone for networked programmes. Similarly in Scotland, both the Scottish and Grampian regions were rebranded in 2006 as "STV" at all times.

==== National continuity branding ====
Continuity branding used for networked programmes, that is, excluding regional programmes.

Area	2002–2006	2006–2013	2013–2020	2020–2022	from 2022	2013
Northern Scotland	Grampian TV	STV				
Central Scotland	Scottish TV	STV				
Northern Ireland	UTV			UTV /; ITV (Note: UTV branding is still used with regional programmes.)	UTV /; ITV1	
Channel Islands	Channel	ITV1 Channel Television	ITV		ITV1	
England, Southern Scotland, Isle of Man	ITV1 (Note: Until 2006, regional programmes outside London were preceded by continuity with joint ITV1/regional branding)		ITV		ITV1	
Wales	ITV1 Wales		ITV		ITV1	

==== Franchise and news regions ====
With all English franchises owned by ITV plc, there have been times when the news regions have not coincided with the official franchise regions. These exceptions are listed in the tables below. For the names of the regional news programmes, see ITV (TV network) § Regional programming.

ITV network regions and sub-regions continue to be used by ITV Media to sell different advertisements in each sub-region.

Area	2004–2006	2006–2009	2009–2013	from 2014	Maps
Northern Scotland	Grampian Television	STV North			
Central Scotland	Scottish Television	STV Central			
Northern Ireland	UTV				
Channel Islands	Channel Television		ITV Channel Television		Franchise regions 2002–2013 News regions 2002–2006 News regions 2006–2009 News regions 2009–2013 Franchise and news regions since 2014
North East England	ITV Tyne Tees		Franchise: ITV Tyne Tees	ITV Tyne Tees	Franchise regions 2002–2013 News regions 2002–2006 News regions 2006–2009 News regions 2009–2013 Franchise and news regions since 2014
North East England	ITV Tyne Tees		News: ITV Tyne Tees & Border	ITV Tyne Tees	Franchise regions 2002–2013 News regions 2002–2006 News regions 2006–2009 News regions 2009–2013 Franchise and news regions since 2014
Southern Scotland, Cumbria	ITV Border		News: ITV Tyne Tees & Border	ITV Border	Franchise regions 2002–2013 News regions 2002–2006 News regions 2006–2009 News regions 2009–2013 Franchise and news regions since 2014
Southern Scotland, Cumbria	ITV Border		Franchise: ITV Border	ITV Border	Franchise regions 2002–2013 News regions 2002–2006 News regions 2006–2009 News regions 2009–2013 Franchise and news regions since 2014
Isle of Man	ITV Border		ITV Granada		Franchise regions 2002–2013 News regions 2002–2006 News regions 2006–2009 News regions 2009–2013 Franchise and news regions since 2014
North West England	ITV Granada		ITV Granada		Franchise regions 2002–2013 News regions 2002–2006 News regions 2006–2009 News regions 2009–2013 Franchise and news regions since 2014
Yorkshire and Lincolnshire	ITV Yorkshire				Franchise regions 2002–2013 News regions 2002–2006 News regions 2006–2009 News regions 2009–2013 Franchise and news regions since 2014
East of England	ITV Anglia				Franchise regions 2002–2013 News regions 2002–2006 News regions 2006–2009 News regions 2009–2013 Franchise and news regions since 2014
Midlands	ITV Central	ITV Central			Franchise regions 2002–2013 News regions 2002–2006 News regions 2006–2009 News regions 2009–2013 Franchise and news regions since 2014
Oxfordshire	ITV Central	Franchise: ITV Central		ITV Meridian	Franchise regions 2002–2013 News regions 2002–2006 News regions 2006–2009 News regions 2009–2013 Franchise and news regions since 2014
Oxfordshire	ITV Central	News: ITV Thames Valley	News: ITV Meridian	ITV Meridian	Franchise regions 2002–2013 News regions 2002–2006 News regions 2006–2009 News regions 2009–2013 Franchise and news regions since 2014
Berkshire, northern Hampshire	ITV Meridian	News: ITV Thames Valley	ITV Meridian	ITV Meridian	Franchise regions 2002–2013 News regions 2002–2006 News regions 2006–2009 News regions 2009–2013 Franchise and news regions since 2014
Berkshire, northern Hampshire	ITV Meridian	Franchise: ITV Meridian	ITV Meridian	ITV Meridian	Franchise regions 2002–2013 News regions 2002–2006 News regions 2006–2009 News regions 2009–2013 Franchise and news regions since 2014
South and South East England	ITV Meridian	ITV Meridian	ITV Meridian	ITV Meridian	Franchise regions 2002–2013 News regions 2002–2006 News regions 2006–2009 News regions 2009–2013 Franchise and news regions since 2014
London area	News: ITV London; Franchises: ITV London Weekday and ITV London Weekend				Franchise regions 2002–2013 News regions 2002–2006 News regions 2006–2009 News regions 2009–2013 Franchise and news regions since 2014
Wales	News: ITV Wales			ITV Cymru Wales	Franchise regions 2002–2013 News regions 2002–2006 News regions 2006–2009 News regions 2009–2013 Franchise and news regions since 2014
Wales	Franchise: ITV Wales & West			ITV Cymru Wales	Franchise regions 2002–2013 News regions 2002–2006 News regions 2006–2009 News regions 2009–2013 Franchise and news regions since 2014
West of England	Franchise: ITV Wales & West			ITV West Country	Franchise regions 2002–2013 News regions 2002–2006 News regions 2006–2009 News regions 2009–2013 Franchise and news regions since 2014
West of England	News: ITV West		News: ITV West and Westcountry	ITV West Country	Franchise regions 2002–2013 News regions 2002–2006 News regions 2006–2009 News regions 2009–2013 Franchise and news regions since 2014
South West England	ITV Westcountry		News: ITV West and Westcountry	ITV West Country	Franchise regions 2002–2013 News regions 2002–2006 News regions 2006–2009 News regions 2009–2013 Franchise and news regions since 2014
South West England	ITV Westcountry		Franchise: ITV Westcountry	ITV West Country	Franchise regions 2002–2013 News regions 2002–2006 News regions 2006–2009 News regions 2009–2013 Franchise and news regions since 2014

==== Production branding ====
Each regional company was not just a broadcaster but also a television production company. After mergers, all the production arms of the companies acquired by ITV plc were taken over by Granada Productions, which became ITV Studios in 2009. The two STV regions formed SMG Productions, which became STV Productions and then STV Studios.

Former regional companies	2002–2004	2004–2006	2006–2009	2009–2020	From 2020
Scottish and Grampian	SMG Productions			STV Productions (Note: From 2008.)	STV Studios
Ulster	UTV				
Channel Television	Channel Television			ITV Studios	
Carlton, Central, Westcountry (Note: Although the HTV franchise was acquired by Carlton, its production arm was sold to Granada.)	Carlton Productions	For ITV regions: ITV Productions; For ITV networks & other broadasters: Granada Productions	For ITV networks & regions: ITV Productions; For other broadasters: Granada Productions	ITV Studios	
All other companies	Granada combined with regional company name and logo	For ITV regions: ITV Productions; For ITV networks & other broadasters: Granada Productions	For ITV networks & regions: ITV Productions; For other broadasters: Granada Productions	ITV Studios	
