= 2024–25 European winter =

Winter season in Europe

Seasonal boundaries
- Meteorological winter: January 1 – March 20
- Astronomical winter: December 21 – March 20
- First event started: January 1, 2025
- Last event concluded: March 20, 2025

Most notable event
  - Fatalities: 2
  - Damage: Unknown

Seasonal statistics
- Rated storms (RSI) (Cat. 1+): 0 total
- Total fatalities: 2 total
- Total damage: Unknown

Related articles
- Asian winter, European windstorm season

The 2024–25 European winter was the winter season that is across the continent of Europe.

== United Kingdom ==
On January 6, temperatures plummeted to −16 °C (3.2 °F). Manchester Airport briefly closed its runways due to heavy snowfall on Thursday before reopening. UK weather forecasters, the Met Office, warned of more travel disruption to road and rail services in some parts, as well as potential accidents in icy areas. Snow and ice warnings were also in place for northern Scotland and Northern Ireland.

== France ==
It was reported that two people were killed and 20 others were injured during a snowstorm in northern France.

== See also ==
- Blizzard
- 2024–25 European windstorm season
- Tornadoes of 2024
- Tornadoes of 2025
- Weather of 2024
- Weather of 2025
