= St Hilary transmitting station =

Transmitting station in Wales

St. Hilary
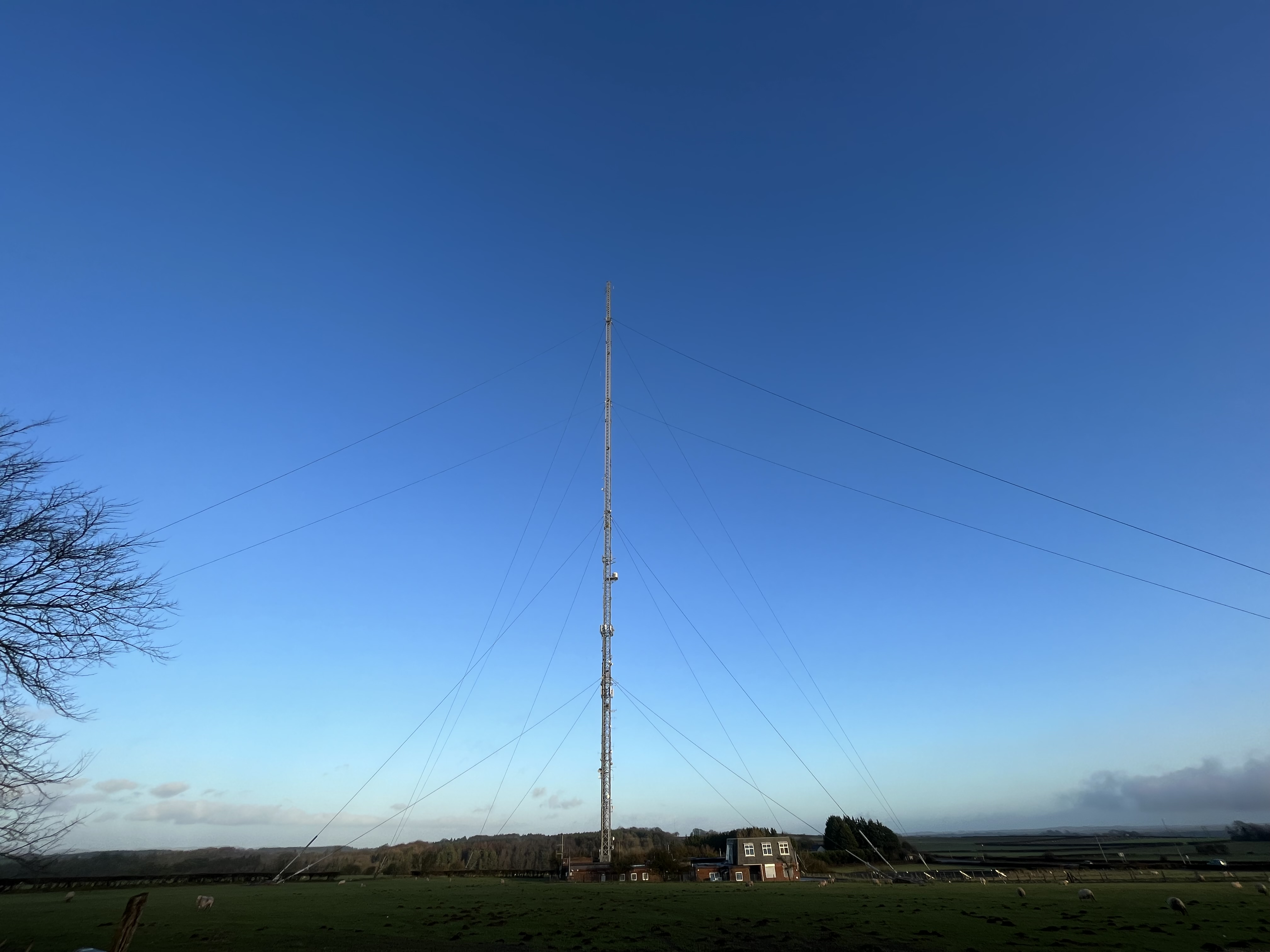

- Location within Vale of Glamorgan
- Mast height: 229 metres (750 ft)
- Coordinates: 51.457222°N 3.402944°W
- Grid reference: ST026741
- Built: 1957
- ITV region: TWW (1958-1968); HTV (1968-1985)

The St Hilary transmitting station is a facility for telecommunications situated close to the village of St Hilary, Glamorgan in the Vale of Glamorgan, Wales, in the United Kingdom. It comprises a 229-metre (750 ft) guyed mast with antennas attached at various heights. The site was established in 1958 for Independent Television transmission on VHF. Transmissions from the site include FM radio, DAB radio and mobile telephone signals.

It broadcasts Heart South Wales on FM and DAB to the large parts of South Wales.

Its broadcast areas include: St. Hilary, Cowbridge, Ystradowen, Miskin, Pontyclun, Bonvilston, St. Nicholas, Swansea, Llanelli, West of Barry, Pontypridd, Caerphilly, Mountain Ash, Llantrisant, Church Village and Talbot Green.

The studios of the regional radio station Nation Radio are located on the site and its DAB transmissions to south-east Wales are made from the mast. Nation Radio also transmits from other sites, including on FM from nearby Wenvoe and from Kilvey Hill in Swansea.

== History ==
=== Construction ===
The plan by the Independent Television Authority (ITA) to build a mast at the site was controversial (prompting a House of Lords debate in May 1957). This was due to its proximity to Rhoose Airport (now Cardiff International Airport), and ITA's initial plan for a 305 m (1,000 ft) mast on a site that itself is 125 m (410 ft) above sea level.

Objections were noted, the mast height was eventually limited to 229 m (750 ft) and it was built by BICC in Summer 1957 to provide 405-line VHF television to south Wales and the West of England.

=== Transmission ===
Test transmissions commenced on 2 September 1957 on Band III channel 10 (199.75 MHz) from antennas at 340 m above sea level and the station entered television broadcast service on that frequency in January 1958. The programming was initially provided by TWW.

In 1965, Band III channel 7 (184.75 MHz) was added to the mast, transmitting from an antenna array sited about 20 m below the existing channel 10 array. This was to carry the programmes of the bilingual Teledu Cymru service that were already being provided by TWW in the rest of Wales, which in 1968 was replaced by Harlech Television (HTV Wales). From that point onwards, the channel 10 transmissions carried the English-language "General Service" (again, initially provided by TWW, and from 1968 by HTV).

In 1985, when 405-line TV closed, the site was re-engineered to remove the VHF television antennas. St. Hilary became just a telecommunications mast and remained so until October 2000 when Real Radio commenced FM Radio broadcasting from the site. In late 2000, DAB Digital Radio was added to the radio broadcasting repertoire initially transmitting the Cardiff & Newport multiplex on channel 11C, but with Swansea SW Wales on channel 12A commencing in February 2004.

In 2006 Ofcom received a proposal for a new Rock-Orientated FM station to transmit from the site, but the licence was awarded to Xfm South Wales, now Nation Radio. Nation's studios are located at the foot of the St Hilary mast, but the station's Cardiff transmitter is a few miles away at Wenvoe.

== Services ==
=== Analogue television ===
==== 14 January 1958 - 15 February 1965 ====
Frequency	VHF	kW	Service
199.75 MHz	10	200	TWW

==== 15 February 1965 - 3 January 1985 ====
Frequency	VHF	kW	Service
184.75 MHz	7	100	HTV Wales (TWW Teledu Cymru until 1968)
199.75 MHz	10	200	HTV General Service (TWW General Service until 1968)

=== Analogue radio (VHF FM) ===
==== October 2000 - May 2014 ====
Frequency	kW	Service
105.4 MHz	5	Real Radio

==== May 2014 - present day ====
Frequency	kW	Service
105.4 MHz	5	Heart South Wales

=== Digital Radio (DAB) ===
==== October 2000 - 31 January 2004 ====
Frequency	Block	kW	Operator
220.352 MHz	11C	2	NOW Cardiff & Newport

==== February 2004 - Present ====
Frequency	Block	kW	Operator
227.360 MHz	12C	2	South East Wales
223.936 MHz	12A	1	Swansea SW Wales

== See also ==
- Radio masts and towers
- List of tallest buildings and structures in Great Britain
