= Independent Television Service for Wales and the West =

Emergency television service (1967)

Independent Television Service for Wales and the West (ITSWW)
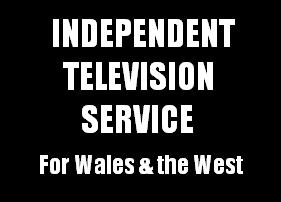

- Reception areas of the two ITSWW services
- Type: Region of television network
- Branding: Independent Television Service for South Wales and the West Independent Television Service Teledu Cymru
- Country: England and Wales
- First air date: 4 March 1968; 57 years ago
- TV transmitters: St Hilary, Preseli, Arfon, Moel-y-Parc
- Headquarters: Bristol; Cardiff
- Broadcast area: West of England; Wales
- Owner: An arrangement by the ITA where HTV used old TWW staff and facilities prior to becoming ready with its own franchise
- Dissolved: 20 May 1968; 56 years ago (after 77 days)
- Picture format: 405-line
- Affiliation(s): ITV
- Language: English and Welsh
- Replaced: TWW
- Replaced by: Harlech Television

Independent Television Service for Wales and the West (ITSWW) was a temporary emergency service provided by the Independent Television Authority (ITA) in light of the early termination of service of the previous franchise holder, Television Wales and the West (TWW) after their loss of ITV franchise was announced in 1967.

== Circumstances ==
In June 1967 the Independent Television Authority (ITA) had announced changes to the structure and contracts of the ITV network in the United Kingdom, to take effect in July 1968. Several changes were announced that would have far-reaching effects for British television. The UK press decided that the most dramatic news was the loss of the Wales and West contract, held by TWW since 1958, to a consortium headed by and named after Lord Harlech.

TWW fought the ITA's decision, both formally and through the press. However, the ITA remained resolute that it was legally entitled to remove any contract at any time for any reason, and the board of TWW eventually accepted this and announced it would carry on providing a programme service to the area until the end of the contract period.

== Problems with TWW ==
Standard regulatory practice at the time stated that the new incumbent of a licence should take on all available staff of the outgoing company. However, the new licence holder, Harlech Television, intended to dismiss all the on-screen personnel of TWW, and launch with a fresh team.

The board of TWW were advised not to take a stake in Harlech that was offered to them by the ITA, but this had the effect of depressing the company's share price. It eventually became clear to the board that to raise the maximum amount of money for shareholders, they should "sell" the last part of the broadcast contract to Harlech. The ITA accepted this and the sale went through for £500,000. However, Harlech were not yet in a position to begin production and would therefore have to launch their promised new service using "in the can" TWW productions.

== ITA solution ==
The ITA suggested Harlech would receive all the advertising revenue from the handover date, and pay TWW a fee to continue local production, while Harlech continued to prepare its own programmes for the original 31 July launch. The interim contract would use neither company's name, and the literal Independent Television Service for Wales and the West was chosen.

This created a cordon sanitaire between the end of TWW and the start of Harlech. Nevertheless, the "in the can" TWW productions, of which there were many, still carried "TWW presents" and "TWW production" captions. The presentation retained TWW in-vision announcers, giving the impression that little had changed. A temporary ident was designed, with four white horizontal bars shooting towards the viewer, electronic music and the name revealing itself a line at a time. The former TWW clock was retained. This was referred to in the local press as "TWW's revenge" on Harlech. The situation lasted just under three months.

The ITSWW service was never referred to as such on air, but it continued both of the former TWW dual services under the names 'South Wales and West' and 'Teledu Cymru' – the latter having been the existing on-air name in that area. Both names were prefixed with the new phrase "Independent Television Service". Extensive broadsheet press advertising was taken out to explain the arrangements to those viewers deemed to be interested. Nothing was placed in the tabloids.

== See also ==
- ITV Emergency National Service

ITV regional service
Preceded by TWW	South Wales and the West of England; 4 March 1968 – 20 May 1968	Succeeded by Harlech Television (General)
Preceded by TWW as Teledu Cymru	Wales; 4 March 1968 – 20 May 1968	Succeeded by Harlech Television (Wales)
