= Kemsley-Winnick Television =

1954 British consortium

Kemsley-Winnick Television was a consortium formed in 1954 to bid for the new commercial television broadcasting licences in the United Kingdom.

The consortium was made up of producer Maurice Winnick, newspaper publisher Lord Kemsley, and the owner of Great Universal Stores, Isaac Wolfson. Their general manager was John McMillan, formerly Chief Assistant on the BBC's Light Programme.

In October 1954, the ITA announced that Kemsley-Winnick had been successful in obtaining the initial franchises for weekend television in the North and the Midlands.

The company collapsed in 1955, shortly after the award of the contracts, when Lord Kemsley's concerns about the potential financial exposure led to him withdrawing from the consortium. Disagreements with Winnick led to Wolfson also leaving. The departure of so many senior figures led the ITA to declare the company was now different from that which submitted the bid, and they re-advertised the contract. The contract was eventually awarded to ABC, who had previously been offered the 7-day Midlands contract, but ABC's board refused. After Kemsley-Winnick's collapse, ABC were awarded the North and Midlands Weekend contract on 21 September 1955, the day before ITV started broadcasting, and ABC started broadcasting the following year. ABC also bought the camera and broadcasting equipment that Kemsley-Winnick had planned to use.
