= Independent Television Authority =

Regulator of UK commercial television until 1972

- ITA logo 1969–1972

Agency overview
- Formed: 1954
- Dissolved: 1972
- Superseding agency: Independent Broadcasting Authority (1972)
- Headquarters: United Kingdom

The Independent Television Authority (ITA) was an agency created by the Television Act 1954 (2 & 3 Eliz. 2. c. 55) to supervise the creation of "Independent Television" (ITV), the first commercial television network in the United Kingdom. The ITA existed from 1954 until 1972. It was responsible for determining the location, constructing, building, and operating the transmission stations used by the ITV network, as well as determining the franchise areas and awarding the franchises for each regional commercial broadcaster. The authority began its operations on 4 August 1954, a mere four days after the Television Act 1954 received royal assent, under the chairmanship of Sir Kenneth Clark. The authority's first director general, Sir Robert Fraser was appointed by Clark a month later on 14 September.

The physics of VHF broadcasting meant that a comparatively small number of transmitters could cover the majority of the population of Britain, if not the bulk of the area of the country. The ITA determined that the first three franchise areas would cover the London area, the English Midlands, and Northern England (the Lancashire/Yorkshire belt of industrial cities from Liverpool to Hull and the surrounding countryside). All three franchise areas would be awarded on a divided weekday/weekend basis, and it was planned that the franchise holders for these areas would produce the great bulk of network programmes, while the companies given the smaller franchises would produce mainly local programmes for their area only.

== Franchises ==
The ITA awarded franchises to applicant companies, selecting between applicants on the basis of the financial soundness and structure of the company, the proposals for the service to be offered, and often on connections between the applicant company and the area to be served.

Franchises were awarded initially between 1954 and 1961, with the new television stations usually beginning their broadcasting one-to-two years later. During September 1963 the ITA invited new applications for franchises to operate from July 1964 for three years or until the arrival of a second commercial channel, whichever came first, but in fact no changes were made to any franchise holders at that time, except for confirming the merger of the South Wales and the West franchise held by TWW and the Wales West and North franchise held by WWN following the financial collapse of WWN. (In the event, a second commercial channel did not begin until 1982, under the guise of Channel 4.)

=== Initial franchises awarded in 1954 ===
- The London (Monday to Friday) franchise was awarded to Associated-Rediffusion.
- The London (Saturday and Sunday) and Midlands (Monday to Friday) franchises were awarded to the Associated Broadcasting Company, later renamed Associated TeleVision (ATV).
- The Midlands (Saturday and Sunday) and North of England (Saturday and Sunday) franchises were awarded to Kemsley-Winnick Television (which subsequently collapsed; the franchise was reallocated in 1955 to the Associated British Picture Corporation as ABC Weekend Television).
- The North of England (Monday to Friday) franchise was awarded to Granada Television.

In January 1955 the ITA authorised the creation of ITN (Independent Television News), a company owned and operated by the ITV companies collectively, to provide a news service for the new network.

On 22 September 1955 the ITV service opened in the London area, where the ITA transmitter could reach a population of nearly 12 million. The first commercial on British television was for "Gibbs SR" toothpaste.

=== Franchises awarded in 1956 ===
- The Central Scotland franchise was awarded to Scottish Television (STV), from three applications.
- The South Wales and West of England franchise (on both sides of the Severn Estuary) was awarded to Television Wales and the West, TWW, from ten applications.

=== Franchises awarded in 1957 ===
- The South of England franchise was awarded to Southern Television, from thirteen applications.
- The North East England franchise was awarded to Tyne Tees Television, from eleven applications.

=== Franchises awarded in 1958 ===
- The East of England franchise was awarded to Anglia Television, from eight applications.
- The Northern Ireland franchise was awarded to Ulster Television (UTV), from four applications.

=== Franchise awarded in 1959 ===
- The South West England franchise was awarded to Westward Television, from fifteen applications.

=== Franchises awarded in 1960 ===
- The franchise for the Channel Islands was awarded to Channel Television, from two applications, following the extension of the Television Act 1954 to the Islands by the Television Act 1954 (Channel Islands) Order 1961 (SI 1961/2039), as it normally would not apply there.
- The franchise for the English-Scottish Border and the Isle of Man was awarded to Border Television, from two applications, following the Television Act 1954 (Isle of Man) Order 1957 (SI 1957/602)
- The franchise for North East Scotland was awarded to Grampian Television, from seven applications.

=== Franchise awarded in 1961 ===
- The franchise for West and North Wales was awarded to the Wales Television Association, Teledu Cymru, transmitting as WWN, Wales (West and North) Television.

When WWN went on the air on 14 September 1962, the ITV network was completed. However, due to the late commissioning of two of WWN's three transmitters, the company never received more than half the projected income and the company failed in January 1964; the two Welsh franchises were consequently merged, with TWW broadcasting to the whole of Wales.

=== Franchise review 1967 ===
The 1967 franchise review involved substantial changes:

- All weekday/weekend split franchises were ended except in London.
- The North of England franchise was split between North West England, awarded to Granada Television, and the three Ridings of Yorkshire to create Yorkshire Television.
- The new seven-day franchise in the Midlands was awarded to (ATV).
- The ITA asked ABC and Associated-Rediffusion to merge, forming Thames Television which was awarded the London Weekday franchise.
- LWT was awarded the London Weekend franchise (from 7 pm on Fridays).
- Most controversially, TWW lost its franchise for Wales and the West of England to Harlech Television, which soon became known as HTV.

The 1967 franchises were subsequently extended in stages to expire in 1976, then 1979, and finally to expire on 31 December 1981. See the entry for the IBA for details of the 1981 and 1991–2 franchise rounds.

== Changes from 1972 ==
The Sound Broadcasting Act 1972 gave the ITA responsibility for organising commercial radio in the UK, and reconstituted the ITA as the Independent Broadcasting Authority (IBA) with effect from Wednesday 12 July 1972. The IBA was subsequently replaced by the Independent Television Commission (ITC) and the Radio Authority under the provisions of the Broadcasting Act 1990, which themselves were replaced by the Office of Communications (Ofcom) at the end of 2003.

== Chairman ==
Status

Denotes Acting Chairman

Portrait	Name (Birth–Death)	Term of office		Honour(s)	Prime Minister	Monarch (Reign)
	Sir Kenneth Clark (1903–1983)	4 August 1954	31 August 1957	Baron Clark for life in 1969	Winston Churchill	Queen Elizabeth II (1952–2022)
	Sir Kenneth Clark (1903–1983)	4 August 1954	31 August 1957	Baron Clark for life in 1969	Anthony Eden	Queen Elizabeth II (1952–2022)
	Sir Kenneth Clark (1903–1983)	4 August 1954	31 August 1957	Baron Clark for life in 1969	Harold Macmillan	Queen Elizabeth II (1952–2022)
	Sir Ronald Matthews (1885–1959)	1 September 1957	6 December 1957		Harold Macmillan	Queen Elizabeth II (1952–2022)
	Sir Ivone Kirkpatrick (1897–1964)	7 November 1957	6 November 1962		Harold Macmillan	Queen Elizabeth II (1952–2022)
	Sir John Carmichael (1910–1996)	7 November 1962	30 June 1963		Harold Macmillan	Queen Elizabeth II (1952–2022)
	Charles Hill, Baron Hill of Luton (1904–1989)	1 July 1963	30 August 1967		Harold Macmillan	Queen Elizabeth II (1952–2022)
	Charles Hill, Baron Hill of Luton (1904–1989)	1 July 1963	30 August 1967		Sir Alec Douglas-Home	Queen Elizabeth II (1952–2022)
	Charles Hill, Baron Hill of Luton (1904–1989)	1 July 1963	30 August 1967		Harold Wilson	Queen Elizabeth II (1952–2022)
	Herbert Bowden, Baron Aylestone (1905–1994)	1 September 1967	11 July 1972		Harold Wilson	Queen Elizabeth II (1952–2022)
	Herbert Bowden, Baron Aylestone (1905–1994)	1 September 1967	11 July 1972		Edward Heath	Queen Elizabeth II (1952–2022)

== See also ==
- History of ITV

Communications regulation and maintenance
Regulation of ITV; 4 August 1954 – 11 July 1972	Succeeded by Independent Broadcasting Authority
Maintenance of ITV Transmitters; 4 August 1954 – 11 July 1972	Succeeded by Independent Broadcasting Authority
