= Television Wales and the West =

British independent television franchisee (1958–1968)

- Reception areas of the two TWW services when it closed in 1968
- Type: Region of television network
- Branding: TWW Teledu Cymru, TWW network for Wales
- Country: United Kingdom (England and Wales)
- First air date: 14 January 1958; 68 years ago
- TV transmitters: St Hilary, Preseli, Arfon, Moel-y-Parc
- Headquarters: London, Bristol, Cardiff
- Broadcast area: South Wales; West of England; West and North Wales from 1964
- Owner: Self-owned
- Dissolved: 3 March 1968; 58 years ago (after 10 years, 49 days)
- Picture format: 405-line
- Affiliation: ITV
- Language: English and Welsh
- Replaced: Wales West and North Television in west and north Wales in 1964
- Replaced by: Independent Television Service for Wales and the West; Harlech

Television Wales and the West (TWW) was the British Independent Television (commercial television) contractor for a franchise area that initially served South Wales and West of England (franchise awarded 26 October 1956, started transmissions on 14 January 1958, the eighth franchise to launch) until 1968.

For the first six years, TWW's service was provided from a single VHF transmitter serving both south east Wales and the west of England. The later acquisition of Teledu Cymru in 1964 allowing TWW to extend its coverage across most of Wales and to provide separate services for the Welsh and English parts of the resulting 'dual region' franchise.

After losing their franchise to Harlech in 1967, TWW ended their service early in protest long before Harlech was ready to take over. This caused the Independent Television Authority to organise an emergency transitional service run by Harlech but using TWW's staff, leftover programming, and some assets.

== History ==
=== Launch ===
Television Wales and the West opened transmission at 4:45 pm on 14 January 1958 with a live, 15-minute opening ceremony by station chairman Lord Derby, programming director Sir Ifan ab Owen Edwards and Alfred Francis. The master of ceremonies was chief continuity announcer, Bruce Lewis.

One of TWW's rumoured investors was NBC of the US, although the ITA demanded them to step out.

At 6:00 pm, Youth Wants to Know, a children's interview programme produced by Granada Television, became the first programme to be broadcast by TWW. In the programme, Lady Megan Lloyd George and Raymond Gower fielded questions from Welsh school children. Following Youth Wants to Know, ITN's early evening news at 6:30 pm was read by Huw Thomas from TWW's studios at Pontcanna.

The main opening programme came at 7:00 pm with The Stars Rise in the West, a filmed special introduced by It's That Man Again regular Jack Train. The programme, produced in association with ITN, featured appearances from Ralph Richardson, Stanley Baker (later a founder of TWW's successors, Harlech Television), Naunton Wayne, Donald Sinden, Tessie O'Shea, Donald Houston, Petula Clark, Tommy Cooper and Ralph Reader. Harry Secombe also appeared in a short film clip, performing Nessun Dorma.

=== Expansion and takeover of WWN ===
Another company, Wales West and North Television (WWN), originally held a separate franchise licence for a much larger but, critically, less densely populated part of Wales, and broadcast under the on-screen name of Teledu Cymru. In 1963, the company shut its non-news services, and in, January 1964, became the only ITV company to fail financially. TWW acquired the service of its neighbour, which it ran as a separate service under the banner Teledu Cymru, TWW Network for Wales. The two franchises were merged into a single Wales and West franchise, rather than the ITA re-advertising the financially inviable North and West Wales one. Although WWN's buildings were not retained, some of their stars were kept on by TWW, including in-vision continuity announcer Iris Jones. The new Teledu Cymru outlet was expanded to Southern Wales, ironically, the audience that WWN needed if it wanted to survive as an independent company.

The transmitters of Teledu Cymru could be picked up in the southeast of the Republic of Ireland as well, and gained a following in a country where there was only one domestic channel at the time. Announcers like Iris Jones acknowledged this audience by wishing viewers goodnight in Welsh and Irish. Jones travelled to Wexford in 1966 to meet Teledu Cymru's Irish fans.

TWW's later programme controller was Wyn Roberts, Baron Roberts of Conwy, later a Conservative MP.

=== Franchise loss ===
Partly because its regional programming was so well regarded it came as a great shock when TWW lost its franchise in the 1967 franchise review, in favour of the Harlech Consortium, whose bid promised a glittering future of star-filled entertainment and quality documentaries.

No reason was given for the dismissal (as is common practice for franchise changes) but it was believed that TWW's decision to keep its corporate headquarters in London and not move them to within the region was a significant factor. A darker explanation proffered at the time was that it was "government revenge" against the broadcaster's major shareholder the News of the World newspaper, which had printed a series of critical articles about the then Prime Minister Harold Wilson. This does appear unlikely as although the Independent Television Authority (ITA), who carried out the franchise review, was answerable to Parliament, it was a wholly independent body. Furthermore, TWW applied to the franchise review under both their name and that of the defunct WWN as a tax dodge, which may have annoyed the authority.

TWW's management was angered at the decision, especially Lord Derby himself, who felt betrayed by Lord Hill, who was in charge of the ITA. The ITA offered TWW a 40% stake in Harlech as appeasement. Under ITA rules, Harlech would have been made to keep on TWW's entire workforce, but refused this, despite the experience and popularity of TWW's stars.

=== Closure ===
The franchise would not end until 30 July 1968. However, in the beginning of that year, the company's stock prices declined to a point that, on 12 February 1968, TWW decided to end its operations early, selling the last five months of operations to Harlech. This plan, which allowed TWW's shareholders to salvage the remaining profits, had the tacit backing of the ITA. The closing date was set as 3 March 1968, and the company would dissolve the day after. However, Harlech did not have its new programming line-up ready yet, with their only option to pay TWW's staff to continue their jobs in the interim. To avoid an ignominious launch of the Harlech brand, this new arrangement would be called Independent Television Service for Wales and the West. Harlech would receive the advertising income during the transition period. Many TWW staff had their wages doubled by Harlech to persuade them to stay on, despite knowing they would lose their jobs once Harlech launched properly in May.

Much of the station's closing night was made up of in-house produced output including Live Like A Lord (a music and comedy show with mainstay TWW personality Ivor Emmanuel and Clive Dunn), teenybopper music show Discs a Go-Go (with future Radio Caroline/United DJs presenter Tony Prince) and Sing Me A Fantasy (a musical film). The feature programme of the night was TWW's penultimate production, All Good Things, a late night variety special presented by Bernard Braden and featuring amongst others, Tessie O'Shea, Stan Stennett, Ivor Emmanuel, Manfred Mann, Clifford Evans, Anita Harris and Morecambe & Wise. The programme was preceded by an introduction from company chairman Lord Derby.

This was followed by Come To An End, a reflective epilogue with John Betjeman, who had made several films for the station, paying tribute to the personnel, programmes and achievements of TWW (which Betjeman affectionately referred to as Tellywelly).

Ironically recorded at the Granville Theatre in London, Betjeman closed the epilogue and the station with these words:

The new firm, Harlech, which will be centred in Cardiff, must build up its own personality. Tellywelly, you had a warm, friendly and inspiring one. Like many others, I'm very grateful to you. I'm sorry to see you go. It's like the death of an old friend.

As Betjeman walked out of the theatre and the credits rolled, the camera tilted up to the "EXIT" sign on the wall, and TWW ended its transmission for the last time. As planned, the Independent Television Service for Wales and the West, broadcasting from the old TWW Pontcanna studios in Cardiff, and staffed by former TWW workers, until Harlech (soon renamed "HTV") was ready to take over its franchise early, on 20 May 1968, after which, the TWW staff were dismissed, though the studios were kept by Harlech.

== Studios ==
TWW operated from two sites – a converted farm at Pontcanna, near Cardiff (now demolished and replaced by a housing estate) and similar facilities at Bath Road in Bristol.

Although TWW inherited Teledu Cymru's studios in Western Avenue, Cardiff it was decided to sell these and base both operations at Pontcanna. To accommodate this dual presentation and general increase in production the takeover created, £2 million was spent on updating and extending the studios at Pontcanna, including a new studio and separate transmission control suites.

TWW was also a player in the development of 625-line colour transmission for the ITV network. Although the bulk of test transmissions and research were conducted for the Independent Television Authority (ITA) at the ABC studios at Teddington, TWW leased two prototype EMI colour cameras and associated equipment in 1966 and began running trials, with shows being transmitted on internal networks for viewing by employees.

== Transmitters and sub-regions ==
Until 1965, viewers in both south east Wales and the English West parts of the franchise received ITV on VHF channel 10 from the ITA transmitter at St Hilary located on Stalling Down, near Cowbridge in south Wales. This did not accommodate separate programme services and so a combined service was provided to viewers in both the Welsh and English parts of the single licence area. Although TWW had studios in both Cardiff and Bristol, the outputs of these were combined at Cardiff into a single programme stream to feed the single transmitter at St Hilary. Hence, for example, local news bulletins involved an on-air switch or handover between the two studios and viewers would alternately see items from both sources.

Whilst the original service provided by TWW from St Hilary had to carry a mix of content for viewers on each side of the Bristol Channel, the west and north of Wales were served by other VHF transmitters which carried a more specific Welsh programme service branded Teledu Cymru. TWW had acquired the licence to broadcast to the west and north of Wales following the commercial failure of WWN.

Following the acquisition of WWN, a second VHF transmitter (using VHF channel 7) was added at St Hilary in 1965 to effectively extend the Teledu Cymru network into SE Wales thus permitting programmes of specific interest in Wales to be broadcast exclusively to Wales whilst running a separate schedule for English and South Wales viewers on channel 10. This was the first significant step in providing two distinct and separate programme services for Wales and for West and effectively established TWW's area as a 'dual region' during the last few years of their tenure.

== Presentation ==
TWW's on screen identity consisted, originally, of a circle containing the letters TWW, with a large 'T' in the centre and a small 'W' to either side. This apparently static caption was used for the first few years of the station's existence before the familiar box logo appeared. This logo was animated and formed when the boxes rotated revealing one letter at a time, accompanied by a twelve-note fanfare.

Following the acquisition of WWN, their Teledu Cymru branding was utilised by TWW for the North and West Wales service. The TWW logo was added beneath the Teledu Cymru dragon, along with the caption 'Network for Wales'.

Iris Jones, Ivor Roberts, Vincent Daniels, Linda Lee, Maureen Staffer, John Mead, Guy Thomas and Christine Godwin were among the most well-known continuity announcers.

== Programmes ==
TWW did not produce many programmes for the ITV network, although the monthly Sunday evening Welsh musical entertainment show, Land of Song, proved very popular during its six-year run 1958–64; TWW's news and local programming were well regarded (it won many plaudits for its sensitive coverage of the Aberfan Disaster).

Its Welsh magazine programme was called Amser Te (Tea Time). Amongst other items, it featured a regular cookery item hosted by Myfanwy Howell and the popular Welsh music show Gwlad y Gan.

TWW also launched the careers of many famous faces, who appeared on their early broadcasts. These include John Humphrys and Claire Rayner. TWW was the first to showcase Adge Cutler – his appearances on the TWW programme 'The Cider Apple' led to Adge's fame spreading and the formation of The Wurzels. Michael Palin was one of the presenters of TWW's pop show 'NOW!'. Bruce Lewis was one of TWW's main news presenters; he went on to write various books about his experience during the Second World War, "Aircrew, a Few of the First", plus other titles such as How to be A TV Presenter – his son, Peter Lewis, hosted Movie Magazine and went on to announce for TWW, HTV West, and most famously, LWT.

== See also ==
- Wales West and North Television
- Independent Television Service for Wales and the West
- HTV

ITV regional service
New service	South Wales and the West of England; 14 January 1958 – 3 March 1968 as TWW (general service)	Succeeded by Independent Television Service for South Wales and the West
Preceded by Wales West and North Television as Teledu Cymru	Wales; 27 January 1964 – 3 March 1968 as Teledu Cymru, TWW Network for Wales	Succeeded by Independent Television Service; Teledu Cymru
