= ITV Wales & West =

Former ITV franchise area in the United Kingdom

- Final logos, both used from 2006 to 2013

- The Wales and West sub-regions when the franchise ended in 2013
- Type: Region of television network
- Branding: ITV1, ITV Wales
- Country: United Kingdom
- First air date: 20 May 1968; 58 years ago
- TV transmitters: Wenvoe; Mendip; Carmel; Preseli; Blaenplwyf; Llanddona; Moel-y-Parc; Long Mountain; Kilvey Hill; St Hilary
- Headquarters: Cardiff; Bristol
- Broadcast area: Wales; West of England
- Owner: ITV plc
- Dissolved: Lost on-air identity on 27 October 2002; Licence ended on 31 December 2013 (after 45 years, 225 days)
- Former names: HTV; HTV Cymru Wales & HTV West; Harlech Television
- Picture format: 1080i HDTV, downscaled to 16:9 576i for SDTV
- Affiliation: ITV
- Language: English and Welsh
- Replaced: TWW / Independent Television Service for Wales and the West
- Replaced by: ITV Cymru Wales; ITV West Country

ITV Wales and West, previously known as Harlech Television (HTV), was an ITV franchisee in the United Kingdom until 31 December 2013, licensed to broadcast by the regulator Ofcom.

There is no channel, past or present, named "ITV Wales and West". The licence relates to a "dual region", meaning that the franchise area was divided into two sub-regions, Wales and the West of England, each of which had to be served by distinct and separate ITV programme services, as more fully defined within the licence.

From January 2014, the dual-region licence was split in two, with ITV Cymru Wales for Wales and ITV West Country covering both the West of England sub-region and South West England. Both licences remain held by ITV plc through its subsidiary ITV Broadcasting Ltd, and the legal names of the former HTV companies have not yet been changed again, although the former holding company was however dissolved on 7 February 2023.

== History ==
Harlech Television was awarded its contract by the Independent Television Authority in July 1967, replacing the incumbent TWW. While no official reason was given for the decision, it was believed TWW's preference to base its corporate headquarters in London, rather than within the region, was a key factor.

Harlech pledged to locate its headquarters within the transmission area, based at TWW's former studios at Pontcanna in Cardiff, and at Bath Road in Bristol. TWW refused to purchase shares in the new consortium, Harlech refused to take on TWW's staff, and TWW opted to cease broadcasting early on Monday 4 March 1968, in order to capitalise on its remaining stock prices, selling its remaining airtime to Harlech for £500,000. As the new company was not ready to launch, it paid TWW's former staff to provide an unbranded emergency service until Harlech's launch on Monday 20 May 1968. The opening night was marked by a networked variety special.

Initially, the station used the name Harlech Television (after the head of the company, Lord Harlech), but from the introduction of colour on 6 April 1970, this was dropped in favour of the initialism HTV. Other than being simpler, this also largely ended concerns from the West of England that the 'Harlech' branding was only associated with the Welsh part of the dual region.

The initial Harlech board of directors boasted a high-profile line-up including actor Richard Burton and his wife Elizabeth Taylor, opera singer Sir Geraint Evans, entertainer Harry Secombe, actor-producer Stanley Baker, millionaire businessman John James and veteran broadcaster Wynford Vaughan-Thomas. The board contributed relatively little to HTV's output, although notable productions included several opera specials and documentary series including Great Little Trains of Wales and The Dragon Has Two Tongues.

In Wales, there was an additional requirement to provide a quota of programmes in the Welsh language. HTV Cymru's nightly news programme Y Dydd aired each weeknight in a 6 pm timeslot shared with its English counterpart Report Wales. Alongside current affairs, features and entertainment programming, the company pioneered a wide range of Welsh output for children and young people including Miri Mawr, Ffalabalam and pop magazine show Ser. Two of the company's best known Welsh language series, Cefn Gwlad and Y Byd ar Bedwar, continue to air on S4C.

HTV West was particularly successful in producing high-quality children's TV series, often sold internationally. It established the 'HTV Junior Drama Workshop' in Bristol, which auditioned and trained young actors and from which it cast roles for both its own productions, and for other companies seeking young talent. Arthur of the Britons (a historic adventure series), Children of the Stones (a supernatural thriller shot amid the famous stone circle at Avebury in Wiltshire) and Robin of Sherwood were all very popular wherever they were shown.

In addition to networked and locally-produced programming, HTV also broadcast imported output and was the first British broadcaster to air Sesame Street as part of an IBA pilot in 1971 (the programme had been rejected by the BBC). HTV Wales produced far less drama output, although they were contracted to make the ten-part Return to Treasure Island for The Disney Channel in 1985.

In November 1982, the new Welsh-language channel S4C was launched. HTV no longer broadcast Welsh-language programmes, but instead produced such programmes for S4C (along with the BBC and independent producers). The increased demand for programmes in the medium of Welsh encouraged an expansion of HTV's resources. HTV also began to supply local commercial playout for both S4C and the new Channel 4, which at that time, carried regional advertising in the West. The Pontcanna premises could not be expanded sufficiently to accommodate the increased studio production and so a new studio complex was constructed at Culverhouse Cross on the western outskirts of Cardiff, eventually going live in 1984.

Further technical innovation was implemented in 1988, when HTV opened a new presentation facility at Culverhouse Cross, becoming the first UK broadcaster to install Sony Library Management Systems which allowed the automated playout of cassette tapes. Three LMS machines were installed, one each to play transmission tapes into the Wales and West services, with the third used for commercials playout and compilation for S4C in Wales and Channel 4 in the West. 1988 also saw HTV begin 24-hour broadcasting when it launched its overnight Night Club service on 22 August.

In May 1990, HTV acquired the UK branch of Vestron Video International, and renamed them to First Independent Films. First Independent Films was a British film distributor and home video company that replaced Vestron Video International's UK operations.

Due to delays in signing its licence agreement in the franchise renewals of 1991, Westcountry Television contracted with HTV to provide its presentation operations and this service made use of the third LMS machine, fitted with updated VTRs. The service launched on New Year's Day 1993. Around the same time, commercial playout for S4C and Channel 4 became an in-house operation for both networks.

During the same 1991 ITV franchise round, the ITC had initially considered disqualifying HTV's bid because of its business plan, but it was ultimately allowed to proceed. HTV won with a bid of £20.5 million, beating three other companies – Merlin, C3WW and C3W. Due to the size of the bid for the franchise, the company had to make considerable savings in order to cover the increased cost of the licence.

The company made a £5 million loss for the first six months of its licence in 1993, following a cut in the levy paid to the Government. Draconian cost-cutting measures took effect – including a wage freeze, the cancellation of annual bonus payments and further substantial job cuts, beyond the job cuts which had already halved staff numbers to 460. The station also revamped its on-screen image, replacing the long-serving Aerial logo and phasing out the use of in-vision continuity.

In 1994, HTV finally cleared its £19 million debt when Flextech bought a 20% stake in the company for £27 million. Flextech passed on its 20% stake in HTV to Scottish Television in September 1995, as part of its deal to gain a larger stake in Scottish Television. The deal heightened speculation of a potential merger between HTV and STV, which never materialised.

In October 1996, United News and Media agreed to buy Scottish Television's 20% stake in the company, ending Carlton's interest about a buyout. HTV and United began talks shortly after the sale aimed at sharing production services and facilities. United was quoted at the time to have "no intention of bidding for the whole company" but within six months, on 28 June 1997, HTV was taken over fully by United News and Media plc (now United Business Media plc) for £370 million.

United News & Media put the HTV-owned First Independent Films up for sale in 1997, following the commercial failure of the movie G.I. Jane in the UK. The assets were eventually acquired by Columbia TriStar Home Video who retained the First Independent Films label for 2 more years before fully absorbing it into their own label in 1999.

In 2000, Granada plc bought United's television interests, but at the time competition regulations limited the extent to which one company could control the ITV network and were consequently forced to give up one of its ITV franchises. This resulted in a break-up of HTV, whereby its broadcast facilities and Channel 3 broadcast licence (and hence its advertising revenues) were sold to Carlton Communications plc, owners of Carlton Television, whilst most of production facilities were retained by Granada. Unlike Carlton's other ITV acquisitions, which were re-branded to use the Carlton name on screen, HTV's identity was retained on-air until 27 October 2002 when the 'ITV1' brand was introduced to most of the network.

Granada and Carlton were subsequently permitted to merge in 2004 to form the single company ITV plc, which now owns all of the ITV franchises in England and Wales. HTV Ltd was renamed ITV Wales & West Ltd in December 2006, alongside HTV Group Ltd, which was renamed ITV Wales & West Group Ltd. On 11 December 2008, the broadcast licence was transferred from ITV Wales & West Group Ltd to ITV Broadcasting Limited, the company now responsible for all regional franchises in England, Wales, and southern Scotland.

In 2009, as part of plans to reduce ITV's regional news service to save costs, ITV West's regional news service was merged with that of ITV Westcountry to form ITV West Country. The new programme ITV News West Country is broadcast from Bristol.

== Studios ==
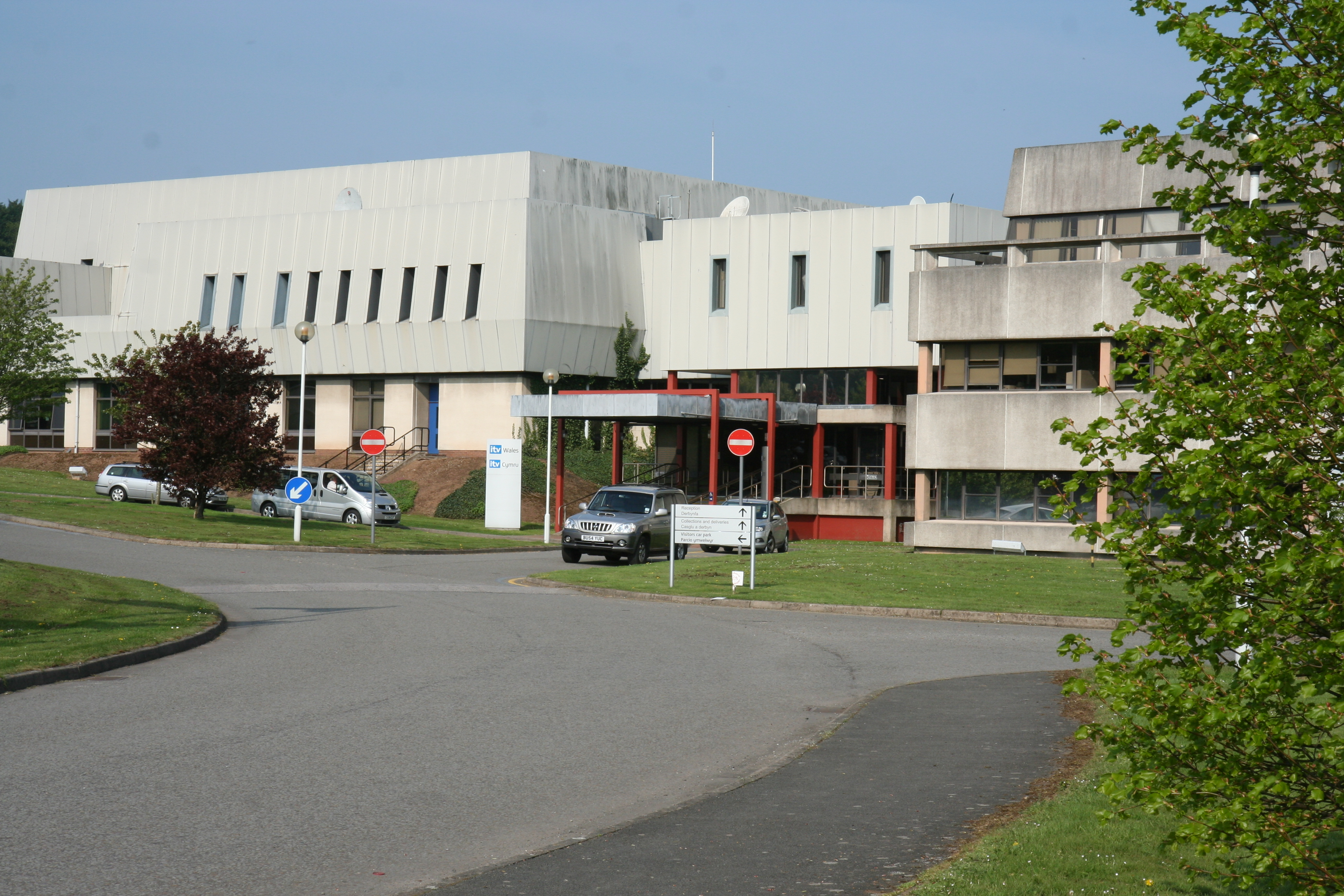
The previous Television Centre, Culverhouse Cross, Cardiff

The company originally operated TWW's former production studios at Pontcanna in Cardiff and at Bath Road in Bristol. Presentation, transmission and back-office staff for both Wales and the West were based largely in Cardiff. The Pontcanna studios remained open until around 1990, by which time, only HTV Wales' news department was based there. During the 1970s and 1980s, the company also ran a North Wales production studio at Theatr Clwyd in Mold.

In 1984, HTV opened a new £14 million television centre at Culverhouse Cross, Cardiff to replace the original one at Pontcanna. Transmission continued to originate from Pontcanna until 1988, when this transferred to the new centre. In addition to providing playout for both HTV services, the new centre would, from 1 January 1993, also provide transmission of South West England franchise Westcountry Television.

The property eventually passed to United Business Media (then United News and Media) following the takeover of HTV by the group in 1997. However, while HTV changed hands twice more, UBM continued to own the Culverhouse Cross buildings and associated land. ITV plc acquired the site on 10 April 2006 for £18.7m and sought to redevelop the property. The largest production studio at Culverhouse Cross had been leased to third party operators since the early 1990s. In an interview with the Western Mail, the head of news and programmes, Phil Henfrey, confirmed ITV Wales would decide whether to stay at the site or re-locate to new, smaller premises in another part of Cardiff.

In August 2013, ITV Wales announced it would leave Culverhouse Cross by June 2014 and move into a new facility on the ground floor of 3 Assembly Square, located next to the Welsh Assembly in Cardiff Bay. Broadcasting from the new studios began on Monday 30 June 2014. The ground, on which Culverhouse Cross Television Centre was located, was sold to Bellway and entirely redeveloped as St Lythans Park, a small housing estate.

In Bristol, HTV were based at Television Centre in Bath Road near Arno's Vale, Bristol, which they took over from TWW. ITV plc continue to have operations in the city and today, the Bristol headquarters are home to ITV West Country's news programme ITV News West Country. ITV have however since sold the building to Cube Real Estate, a commercial property developer, which has refurbished the interior of the building. While ITV West Country maintains office space and a single ground-floor studio, the other floors are available to rent as office space. The property is marketed as 'HERE'.

== Transmitters ==
The Wales and West franchise area operated by TWW was originally confined to the West (comprising Bristol, Somerset, Wiltshire and parts of Gloucestershire and Dorset) and south east Wales (broadly as far west as Swansea) and served by a single main VHF transmitter located at St Hilary. TWW later acquired the use of VHF transmitters covering much of the remainder of Wales from WWN (Wales West and North). An additional VHF transmitter (channel 7) was eventually installed at St Hilary in 1965 to carry programmes specifically for Wales, allowing the separation of Wales and West services. However, St Hilary was never used as part of the replacement UHF network and TV transmission from it ceased when VHF services were switched off in 1985. The mast continues to be used for communications and radio broadcasting.

The UHF transmitter network was designed to replicate the separation of programme services to Wales and the West achieved with the VHF network it replaced. HTV's UHF services were transmitted by the following main transmitters and their relays: Llanddona, Moel-y-Parc, Long Mountain, Blaenplwyf, Preseli, Carmel, Kilvey*, Pontypool*, Wenvoe and Mendip, with Mendip serving the HTV West region and the rest serving the HTV Wales region.

(Kilvey and Pontypool were classed as 'relays' prior to Digital transmission as they were not 'line-fed').

Prior to digital broadcasting, the transmitter distribution system continued to permit the sub-grouping of west and north Wales, echoing the historic VHF regional configuration. However, it was not particularly useful for programme purposes but was sometimes exploited for the transmission of commercials.

The differences between the UHF and VHF networks meant that, between 1970 and 1985, HTV provided three different broadcast services, each with its own schedule of programmes:

- HTV Cymru Wales was available throughout Wales on both UHF and VHF (with the option of different commercials in South Wales and the rest of Wales), and, until the creation of S4C in 1982, included Welsh-language programming.
- HTV West was available in the West of England on UHF only. This service began in 1970.
- The HTV "general service" was available in both the West of England and South Wales on VHF only and carried a mixture of programming from both of the other services. This service ended in 1985.

The transmitter network has remained substantially the same for digital broadcasting of ITV Cymru Wales and ITV West.

== Identity ==
Harlech's first ident on 20 May 1968 featured two words 'Harlech' spinning in opposite ways and which eventually met up to form one word. This design would have been clearly seen to viewers of the service then, however viewers today would have encountered lots of black lines and a barely noticeable 'Harlech'. This is due to the fact that the ident was designed for 405-line television system used at the time, and due to the use of 625-line UHF system, the ident appears differently on sets that receive the 625-line transmission.

HTV logo used from 6 April 1970 to 27 September 1987

When colour broadcasting commenced on Monday 6 April 1970, a new logo, designed by Frank Pegler and FJP Graphics, was unveiled. Due to criticism from viewers in the West of England, concerning the bias towards Wales that Harlech presented, the new logo featured the letters 'HTV'. The symbol created, named "The Aerial", featured the letters HTV in such a way that it looks like a television aerial – the logo went on to become HTV's longest serving identity, surviving until December 1992. The aerial would animate on through use of lines, accompanied by the same jingle as used before. The white logo on blue background was seen plain when both Wales and the West received the programme, but would otherwise have the region name included. For the West region, this was 'West' at the top of the logo between the 'H' and 'V', whereas for Wales, the caption Cymru Wales was placed at the bottom of the logo, as a reference that Welsh programming was still shown on the channel.

Following the launch of S4C on 1 November 1982, all Welsh language programming was transferred to the new service, and the Wales ident was amended so that only the 'Wales' part was displayed at the top of the logo. These idents continued until 28 September 1987, when the idents were dropped in favour of an updated computer-generated sequence, where the blocks flew out of a large suspended blue surface and landed to form the HTV aerial logo on a dark blue background.

HTV adopted the first ITV generic look on 1 September 1989, and it was their slanted 'H; that appeared in their regional section of the ITV logo. Despite the video sequence being the same, there were three variations of the ident, all featuring a different lower caption; HTV, HTV Wales and HTV West. In addition, HTV also made their own variation where the HTV logo remained on-screen the whole time. The corporate idents were dropped on Thursday 31 December 1992.

HTV logo used from 1 January 1993 until 27 October 2002, and for a further two years for news programming

In their place, a new HTV logo was designed and unveiled on Friday 1 January 1993, featuring an upright, but stylised HTV, with two triangles for the 'V' section. Originally this logo was seen as a translucent blue logo moving back onto a multi-coloured blue background accompanied by an ambient tune. This was later changed to a more upbeat tune, ending in a more noticeable crescendo. This ident package marked the end of specific idents for Wales and the West, as all of the idents that followed used the single HTV brand, though separate continuity for the two services, albeit now out of vision, was retained, this presentation package remained popular until Saturday 31 December 1994.

On Sunday 1 January 1995, the ident was re-altered to include small triangles which grew and combined to form the triangular 'V' and the remainder of the HTV logo. The accompanying music was stronger than its predecessor, and the colours were warmer than previous, with a gold HTV and a changing blue, green background and remained on screen for four years until 7 March 1999. Around this time, a large number of specialised idents were introduced – such as variations on the main sequence, specific genre idents and a special presentation package to mark HTV's 30th anniversary in 1998.

On Monday 8 March 1999, HTV introduced what would be its last in-house presentation package, featuring the camera panning over the HTV logo in dark blue against a bright yellow background and accompanied by two remixes to its predecessor (although the tune from the previous ident was used on some occasions). Nine months later, HTV, as part of UNM, adopted the second ITV generic look based on the theme of 'Hearts'. However, when UNM was merged into Granada, the broadcasting arm of HTV was sold to Carlton to comply with competition laws. As a result, from 2 July 2001, HTV adopted, in part, Carlton's star branding. The resultant idents featured Carlton's 'Star' opening films, before the screen flashed white, drawing back to become the 'V' in the HTV logo against the spinning hearts background as used previously.

When Granada and Carlton introduced national ITV1 branding to all stations in England and Wales on 28 October 2002, the HTV channel identity ceased to be used for presentation. It was replaced by the on-screen name ITV1 Wales and ITV1 West of England. ITV1 Wales still used a variation of the generic theme, with the name Wales consistently present under the ITV1 logo. ITV1 West of England's regional identity was gradually phased out from 2002 onward. Originally, prior to regional programming, an ident featuring the celebrity package was used, with an ITV1 logo placed above a small West of England caption to the left of the screen. On 1 December 2003, the regional idents changed to four coloured cubes are seen dotted around a regional scene, with an ITV1 logo and ITV1 for the West of England caption in the bottom right corner. This was replaced on 1 November 2004 by a national ident, consisting of three small ITV cubes above a large '1' cube, with the caption West below. This was one of the last idents for ITV West, as regional idents were abandoned soon after, with the exception of Wales until 2013. The HTV brand was retained for local news programmes until Granada and Carlton merged on 2 February 2004 to create ITV plc. The Carlton name also appeared on endboards from 2001 until 2004, when it was replaced by a generic ITV Wales or ITV West endboard.

== Programmes ==
=== Past programming ===
Programme name	Year(s)/note
Arch of Triumph	1984
Arthur of the Britons	1972–73
Ballroom	1989
Barry Welsh Is Coming	1996–2004, 2007
A Chance to Dance	1993
Definition	1978–1985
Garden Club	1991–96, for Channel 4
Great Expectations	1991, co-produced with Primetime Television Ltd. and Walt Disney Pictures
Elinor	1980s–1990s
Farming Wales	1980s
The Forgotten Story	1983
The Front Row	1997–2001
Hacio	for S4C, 2000–2017
The Ferret	1996–2013
Jamaica Inn	1983
The Jazz Detective	1992
Jenny's War	1985, co-produced with Columbia Pictures Television
Keynotes	1989–1992
The Last Butterfly	1991
The Lilac Bus	1992
Machinegunner	1976
Maigret	1988
The Marshal	1993
The Master of Ballantrae	1984
Men of Affairs	1973–74
Mistress of Suspense	1990–92
The Music Game	1992–93, for Channel 4
Nuts and Bolts	1999–2002
Old Scores	1991
Oliver Twist	1999
On the Road with Elinor	1994–95
Poldark	1996
Pretenders	1972
Robin of Sherwood	1984–86
She-Wolf of London	1990–91
Telltale	1993
To Each His Own	1991
Three Little Words	1967–1986
An Unsuitable Job for a Woman	1997–2001
Wall of Tyranny	1988
We Are Seven	1989–1991
Where in the World	1983–85, for Channel 4
Without Motive	2000–01
The Woman He Loved	1988
Wycliffe	1993–98

==== Children's programmes ====
Programme name	Year(s)/note
Animal Ark	1997–98
The Animal Express	1983
Bimble's Bucket	1996–98
The Bubblegum Brigade	1989
Budgie the Little Helicopter	1994–96
Captain Star	1997–98
Children of the Stones	1977
The Clifton House Mystery	1978
Dr Xargle	1997
The Doombolt Chase	1978
The Famous Five	1990s version, co-produced with Tyne Tees Television
Follow Me…	1977
The Georgian House	1976
The Great Bong	1994–95 for Channel 4
Haunting Harmony	1993
The Honey Siege	1987
Into the Labyrinth	1981–82
It's Time For Me	1969–70
Jangles	1982
King of the Castle	1977
Kipper the Dog	1997–2000
The Little Match Girl	1986
Orbit	1973–75
Percy the Park Keeper	1996–99
The Pig Attraction	1993
Rainbow Toy Shop/Days	1994–97
Return to Treasure Island	1986, co-produced with Primetime Television Ltd. and Walt Disney Pictures
Rolf's Cartoon Club	1989–93
Rubbish, King of the Jumble	1993–94
Sky	1975
The Slow Norris	1995–99
The Snow Queen/The Snow Queen's Revenge	1995
The Top Ten of Everything	1998–2000
Westway	1976
The Wombles	1997–98
The Worst Witch	1998–2001
The Woozies	1976–77
Thomas the Tank Engine and Friends	1988 (Welsh dub of the first two series)

== Archives ==
The National Library of Wales archives hold 200,000 ITV (HTV) film and video items dating from 1958.

== See also ==
- ITV Granada – Channel 3 regional service for North West England
- ITV Central – Independent Television franchisee for the Midlands
- ITV Yorkshire – English TV service for Yorkshire and Lincolnshire

ITV regional services
Preceded by Independent Television Service for South Wales and the West	South Wales & West of England; 405-line VHF; 20 May 1968 – 3 January 1985 as HTV (general service)	Closed 405-line service withdrawn
Preceded by Independent Television Service; Teledu Cymru	Wales; 20 May 1968 – 31 December 2013 as HTV Cymru Wales & ITV Wales	Succeeded by ITV Cymru Wales
New service 625-line service introduced	West of England; 625-line UHF and (from 1998) digital 30 May 1970 – 31 December 2013 as HTV West & ITV West	Succeeded by ITV West Country
