= Northern Scotland =

Northern part of Scotland

Coordinates: 57°42′N 4°50′W

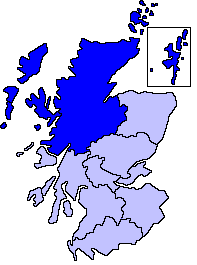
Northern Scotland shown within Scotland

Northern Scotland was an administrative division of Scotland used for police and fire services. It consisted of Highland, the Orkney Islands, the Shetland Islands, and the Western Isles. The police service (Northern Constabulary) used Northern in its name, but the fire service used the name Highlands and Islands Fire and Rescue Service. In 2013, the services were merged into Police Scotland and the Scottish Fire and Rescue Service, respectively.
