= Wales West and North Television =

Welsh independent television contractor (1962–1964)

Wales (West and North) Television

- The Teledu Cymru reception area when WWN collapsed in 1964
- Type: Terrestrial television network
- Branding: Teledu Cymru
- Country: United Kingdom (Wales)
- First air date: 14 September 1962; 64 years ago
- TV transmitters: Preseli; Arfon; Moel-y-Parc
- Headquarters: Cardiff
- Broadcast area: West and North Wales
- Dissolved: 26 January 1964; 62 years ago (after 1 year, 134 days)
- Picture format: 405-line
- Affiliation: ITV
- Language: English and Welsh
- Replaced by: Merged with TWW

Wales (West and North) Television, known on screen as Teledu Cymru (pronounced [tɛˈlɛdɨ ˈkəmrɨ], Welsh for "Wales Television") and often abbreviated to WWN, was the Welsh "Independent Television" (commercial television) contractor awarded the franchise area serving North and West Wales, from 1962 (franchise awarded 6 June 1961). It began transmitting on 14 September 1962, and ceased on 26 January 1964 through financial failure; the franchise area was soon combined with the South Wales and West of England area, operated by TWW. TWW retained the Teledu Cymru name in the former WWN franchise area, as did successor Harlech during their emergency transitional franchise, only retiring the name when they were able to officially take over.

== History ==
The geography of Wales presented a daunting problem to the Independent Television Authority (ITA). The populous area of Wales in the South was already being served by TWW, which had begun broadcasting in 1958, while the north-east of the country and much of the north coast was served by the North of England weekday and weekend franchise holders, Granada and ABC, operating since 1956; the interior of north Wales could not receive ITV transmissions at all.

The ITA was pressured, by a consortium of Welsh-speaking businessmen, into setting up a new North and West Wales region; the ITA asked the Postmaster General to allow this, which he did, with strict provisos: the new service must not offer viewers in Wales a programming choice other viewers did not have (meaning they could not defer the broadcast of networked programmes, which could have been a valuable market as WWN's transmissions were available in the Liverpool area), and at the last minute, the Postmaster General insisted that the new station should, on its own, produce ten hours a week of programmes in Welsh, without relying on Welsh-language programmes produced by Granada, ABC and TWW.

These restrictions were accepted, and the contract was awarded in 1961 to Wales Television Limited, which was later changed to Wales (West and North) Television Limited, following objections from TWW who felt that the original name was intruding on their area. The ITA used three VHF transmitters to broadcast Teledu Cymru; located at Preseli (covering the south west), Arfon (north west) and Moel-y-Parc in the north east. Teledu Cymru launched with the Preseli transmitter on 14 September 1962; making it the 17th and final ITA franchise to launch (Channel Television, another small contractor, began broadcasting two weeks before WWN on 1 September). However, the delay in introducing the transmitters at Arfon and Moel-y-Parc, until later in 1963, destroyed the morale and the finances of WWN. Free programming from the ITV network, plus other support from its neighbours ABC, ATV and TWW just about kept the ship afloat, but Manchester's Granada Television decided to stop making programmes in Welsh, and the loss of this valuable programming stream proved fatal to WWN. Local productions ceased in May 1963 and the station's studios were reduced to a small master control until WWN could find a successor.

TWW offered a generous package to WWN's shareholders to acquire their service, and WWN closed on 26 January 1964 and its studio was shuttered. With the guidance of WWN employees retained by TWW, the Teledu Cymru name was retained, and the new Teledu Cymru was granted a transmitter in the South of Wales. WWN would be the last television service in Wales to broadcast in Welsh during primetime, until the launch of S4C in 1982.

TWW successor Harlech also retained the Teledu Cymru name when TWW's early termination of service forced them to run an emergency transitional franchise, only retiring the name when their own franchise officially started.

== Studios ==
WWN's headquarters and studio complex was located in Western Avenue, Cardiff, despite the fact that was not within their coverage area but that of their neighbouring franchise, TWW. The company had a regional office and a news studio within their franchise area, in Bangor. Following the acquisition of WWN by TWW, the Western Avenue base was closed, with all operations moved to TWW's Pontcanna base, also in Cardiff. To accommodate the addition Teledu Cymru presentation, the Pontcanna studios received a large upgrade. It is believed that the Bangor base was retained by TWW. The studios on Western Avenue were eventually demolished and replaced by the new headquarters for the WJEC examining board.

== Identity ==
WWN's on screen identity featured a stylised dragon against a black background with the Teledu Cymru name beneath. This ident, it is believed, was the only one used by the station, whose existence was very short. Following the takeover from TWW however, the ident was modified. The dragon emblem was retained, as was the Teledu Cymru name, with the only addition being a caption below with TWW's logo and a legend stating 'Network for Wales'. The ident also now animated on screen in sections to the tune of TWW's ident. Following TWW's loss of contract, the Teledu Cymru name was once again used by the Independent Television Service for Wales and the West which operated until HTV could begin broadcasting.

== Programmes ==
Despite its short life, the station was able to produce some local programmes that was produced for its operational periods. Notable programmes included Welsh and English language news bulletins, as well as weekly English language sports programme Welsh Sportlight and its weekly Welsh language sports programme Cip a’r Chwarae, Welsh children's programme Heno I’r Plant, and one nationally shown ballerina opera special entitled Swansea.

ITV regional service
New service	West and North Wales; 14 September 1962 – 26 January 1964	Succeeded by TWW as Teledu Cymru
