= Digital switchover dates in the United Kingdom =

Process of replacing analogue terrestrial with digital terrestrial television in the UK

UK digital switchover dates

The digital switchover was the process by which analogue terrestrial television in the United Kingdom was replaced with digital terrestrial television. It is sometimes referred to as the "analogue switch off".

In the United Kingdom, the terrestrial switchover started on 17 October 2007 and was completed on 24 October 2012. Each group of transmitters within each TV region had its analogue broadcasts switched off at a certain point between those dates. The process was co-ordinated by an independent body, Digital UK (now Everyone TV).

== Switchover guide ==
Stage 1 – Known as DSO1 - Analogue BBC Two and low power digital Multiplex 1 switched off. High power Multiplex 1 switched on.
Stage 2 – Known as DSO2 - All remaining analogue channels and low power digital multiplexes switched off. Remaining high power digital multiplexes switched on.

== Switchover dates ==
These are the dates at which switchover took place in each TV region, as published by Digital UK.

=== Technical trial ===
Transmitter(s)	Area served	BBC One, ITV1, S4C switched off^{†}
Ferryside	Ferryside and Llansteffan communities in Wales (approx 1200 people in around 500 properties)	30 March 2005
^† BBC Two was not switched off until 19 August 2009 in conjunction with stage 1 of Ferryside's parent transmitter, Preseli. In addition, the digital multiplexes did not adopt their final transmission modes until switchover at Preseli in 2009.

=== Border ===
Transmitter(s)	Area served	Stage 1 date (BBC Two switched off)	Stage 2 date (BBC One, ITV1, Channel 4, Channel 5 switched off)
Eskdale Green, Gosforth and Whitehaven^{‡}	Copeland	17 October 2007	14 November 2007
Selkirk Relay transmitters: Bonchester Bridge; Clovenfords; Eyemouth; Galashiels; Hawick; Innerleithen; Jedburgh; Lauder; Peebles; Stow; Yetholm	Scottish Borders	6 November 2008	20 November 2008
Caldbeck Relay transmitters England: Ainstable; Bassenthwaite; Bleach Green HP; Bleach Green VP; Coniston; Crosby Ravensworth; Crosthwaite; Dentdale; ~~Eskdale Green~~ (see above); Glenridding; Glenridding Link; ~~Gosforth~~ (see above); Grasmere; Greystoke; Haltwhistle; Hawkshead; Kendal; Kendal Fell; Keswick; Kirkby Stephen; Lorton; Lowther Valley; Millthrop; Orton; Pooley Bridge; Ravenstonedale; Sedbergh; St Bees; Threlkeld; ~~Whitehaven~~ (see above); Windermere; Workington; Scotland: Ballantrae; Barskeoch Hill; Cambret Hill; Creetown; Dumfries South; Glenluce; Kirkcudbright; Langholm; Minnigaff; Moffat; New Galloway; Pinwherry; Portpatrick; Stanraer; Thornhill	North and Mid-Cumbria, and Dumfries & Galloway	24 June 2009	22 July 2009
^‡ Digital multiplexes from these three transmitters did not adopt their final transmission modes until switchover at their parent transmitter, Caldbeck.

=== Westcountry ===
Transmitter(s)	Area served	Stage 1 date (BBC Two switched off)	Stage 2 date (BBC One, ITV1, Channel 4, Channel 5 switched off)
Beacon Hill Relay transmitters: Ashburton; ~~Budleigh Salterton~~ (new digital transmitter site); Bovey Tracey; Brixham; Buckfastleigh; Chudleigh; Clennon Valley; Coombe; Dartmouth; Edginswell; Halwell; Harbertonford; Hele; Kingskerswell; Liverton; Newton Abbot HP; Newton Abbot VP; Occombe Valley; Sidmouth; South Brent HP; South Brent VP; Teignmouth; Torquay Town; Totnes	South Devon	8 April 2009	22 April 2009
Stockland Hill Relay transmitters: Bampton; Beaminster; Beer; Bincombe Hill; Branscombe; Bridport; Brushford; Chagford; Charmouth; Chideock HP; Chideock VP; Crediton; Culm Valley; Dawlish; Dunsford; Exeter St Thomas; Honiton; Pennsylvania; Preston; Rampisham UHF; Stokeinteignhead; Tiverton; Weymouth	South-west Somerset, parts of west Dorset and south-east Devon, including Exeter	6 May 2009	20 May 2009
Huntshaw Cross Relay transmitters: Barnstaple; Berrynarbor; Braunton; Chambercombe; Combe Martin; Great Torrington; Hartland; Ilfracombe; Muddiford; North Bovey; Swimbridge; Tedburn St Mary; Westward Ho!; Woolacombe	North Devon	1 July 2009	29 July 2009
Redruth Relay transmitters: Alverton; Boscastle; Bossiney; Gulval; Helston; Isles of Scilly; Penryn; Perranporth; Porthleven; Porthtowan; Portreath; Praa Sands; St Anthony in Roseland; St Austell; St Just; Truro	East Cornwall and the Isles of Scilly	8 July 2009	5 August 2009
Caradon Hill Relay transmitters: Aveton Gifford; Compton; Croyde; Downderry; Fowey; Gunnislake; Ivybridge; Kingsbridge; Looe; lostwithiel; Marystow; Mevagissey; Modbury; Newton Ferrers; North Hessary Tor; Okehampton; Penaligon Down; Plymouth North Rd HP; Plymouth North Rd VP; Plymouth Weston Mill; Plympton; Polperro; Port Isaac; Salcombe; Slapton; Southway; St Neot; Tavistock; Widecomebe in the Moor	Cornwall and Devon, including Plymouth	12 August 2009	9 September 2009

=== HTV Wales ===
Transmitter(s)	Area served	Stage 1 date (BBC Two switched off)	Stage 2 date (BBC One, ITV1, S4C, Channel 5 switched off)
Kilvey Hill Relay transmitters: Alltwen; Briton Ferry; Burry Port; Cilfrew; Craig-Cefn-Parc; Efail-fach; Mynydd Emroch; Neath Abbey HP; Neath Abbey HP; Pontardawe	the Swansea Area	12 August 2009	9 September 2009
Preseli Relay transmitters: Abergwnfi; Broad Haven; Bronnant; Croeserw HP; Croeserw VP; Cynwyl Elfed; Dolgellau; Duffryn; ~~Ferryside~~ (see above); Fishguard; Glyncorrwg; Haverfordwest; Llandyfriog; Llandysul; Llangrannog; Llangybi; Llwyn Onn; Mynydd Pencarreg; Newport Bay; Pembroke Dock; Pencader; Rheola; St David's; St Dogmaels; Trefin; Tregaron; Ystumtuen	West Wales	19 August 2009	16 September 2009
Carmel Relay transmitters: Abercraf; Brechfa; Bronwydd Arms; Builth Wells; Cilycwm; Cwmtwrch; Cwm-gors; Erwood; Greenhill; Llandrindod Wells; Llanelli; Llansawel; Llanwrtyd Wells; Penderyn; Rhayader; Talley; Tenby; Ystalyfera	South and central Wales	26 August 2009	23 September 2009
Llanddona Relay transmitters: Amlwch; Arfon; Bethesda; Bethesda North; Betws-y-Coed; Caergybi; Caernarfon; Cemaes; Coed Derw; Conwy; Deiniolen; Dolwyddelan; Ffestiniog; Gronant; Llandecwyn; Llanengan; Maentwrog; Mochdre; Morfa Nefyn; Prestatyn; Trefor; Waunfawr	North-west Wales, including Anglesey	21 October 2009	18 November 2009
Moel-y-Parc Relay transmitters: Bala; Betws yn Rhos; Cefn Mawr; Cerrigydrudion; Corwen; Cyffylliog; Glyn Ceiriog; Glyndyfrdwy; Llanarmon-yn-Iâl; Llandderfel; Llanddulas; Llangernyw; Llangollen; Llanuwchllyn; Pen-y-Banc; Penmaen Rhos; Pontfadog; Pwll-Glas; Storeton; Wrexham-Rhos	North-east Wales	28 October 2009	25 November 2009
Long Mountain Relay transmitters: Broneirion; Carno; Castle Caereinion; Kerry; Llanbrynmair; Llandinam; Llanfyllin; Llangadfan; Llangurig; Llangynog; Llanidloes; Llanrhaeadr-ym-Mochnant; Moel-y-Sant; Tregynon	East-central Wales	4 November 2009	3 December 2009
Blaenplwyf Relay transmitters: Aberystwyth; Afon Dyfi; Beddgelert; Beddgelert Link; Bow Street; Corris; Cwrtnewydd; Dolybont; Machynlleth; Penrhyn-Coch; Trefilan; Ynys-Pennal	Central and mid Wales	10 February 2010	10 March 2010
Wenvoe Relay transmitters: Aberbeeg; Abercynon; Aberdare; Abergavenny; Abertillery; Abertridwr; Bargoed; Bedlinog; Blackmill; Blaenau Gwent; Blaenavon; Blaenllechau; Blaina; Brecon; Chepstow; Clydach; Clyro; Crickhowell; Crucorney; Crumlin; Cym Ffrwd-Oer; Cwmafan; Cwmaman; Cwmfelinfach; Deri; Dowlais; Ebbw Vale; Ebbw Vale South; Ferndale; Fernhill; Gelli-fendigaid; Gilfach; Llanfach; Llanfoist; Llangeinor; Llanharan; Llanhilleth; Llyswen; Machen Upper; Maesteg; Merthyr Tydfil; Monmouth; Mynydd-Bach; Mynydd Machen; Nant-y-Moel; Nantyglo; Newport; Ogmore Vale; Pennar; Pennorth; Penrhiwceiber; Pontypool; Pontypridd; Porth; Rhondda Fach; Rhondda HP; Rhondda VP; Rhymney; Risca; Sennybridge; South Maesteg; South Tredegar; Taff's Well; Tonpentre; Tonypandy; Tonyrefail; Trebanog; Trecastle; Trefechan; Treharris; Tynewydd; Upper Killay; Usk; Van Terrace; Wattsville; Ynysowen	South-east Wales, including Cardiff	3 March 2010	31 March 2010

=== Granada ===
Transmitter(s)	Area served	Stage 1 date (BBC Two switched off)	Stage 2 date (BBC One, ITV1, Channel 4, Channel 5 switched off)
Douglas Relay transmitters: Beary Peark; Foxdale; Glenmaye; Jurby; Kimmeragh; Laxey; Port St Mary; Ramsey; Union Mills	Isle of Man	18 June 2009	16 July 2009
Winter Hill Relay transmitters: Austwick; Backbarrow; Bacup; Barrow Town Hall; Bidston; Birch Vale; Blackburn; Bollington; Brinscall; Broadbottom; Brook Bottom; Burbage; Buxton; Cartmel; Chaigley; Chatburn; Chinley; Congleton; Dalton; Darwen; Delph; Dog Hill; Elton; Far Highfield; Glossop; Haslingden; Haughton Green; Ladder Hill; Lancaster; Langley; Lees; Littleborough; Macclesfield; Manchester Hulme; Melling HP; Melling VP; Middleton; Millom Park; Moss Bank; Mottram in Longdendale; Newchurch; Norden; North Oldham; Oakenhead; Over Biddulph; Parbold; Pendle Forest; Penny Bridge; Portwood; Prestbury; Ramsbottom; Ribblesdale; Romiley; Roose HP; Roose VP; Saddleworth; ~~Skelmersdale~~ (new digital transmitter site); Stavely in Cartmel; Stockport; Storeton; Trawden; Urswick; Walton-le-Dale; Wardle; West Kirby; Whaley Bridge; Whalley; Whitewell; Whitworth; Woodnook	Lancashire, Merseyside, Greater Manchester, Cheshire and South Cumbria	4 November 2009	2 December 2009

=== HTV West ===
Transmitter(s)	Area served	Stage 1 date (BBC Two switched off)	Stage 2 date (BBC One, ITV1, Channel 4, Channel 5 switched off)
Mendip Relay transmitters: Avening; Backwell; Bath; Blakeney; Box; Bristol Barton House; Bristol Ilchester Crescent; Bristol Kings Weston; Bristol Montpelier; Bristol Warmley; Bruton; Burrington; Calne; Carhampton; Cerne Abbas; Chalford; Chalford Vale; Chilfrome; Chiseldon; Chitterne; Cirencester; Clearwell; Coleford; Corsham HP; Corsham VP; Countisbury; Crewkerne; Crockerton; Dursley; Easter Compton; Exford; Frome; Hutton; Kewstoke; Kilve; Lydbrook; Marlborough; Monksilver; Nailsworth; Ogbourne St George; Parkend; Pillowell HP; Pillowell VP; Porlock; Portbury; Portishead; Redbrook; Redcliff Bay; Roadwater; Seagry Court; Siston; Slad; Stroud; Tintern; Ubley; Upavon; Washford; West Lavington; Westwood; Woodcombe; Wootton Courtenay	Bristol, parts of Somerset, Dorset, Wiltshire and Southern Gloucestershire	24 March 2010	7 April 2010
Ridge Hill (West)	North Gloucestershire	6 April 2011	20 April 2011

=== STV North (Grampian) ===
Transmitter(s)	Area served	Stage 1 date (BBC Two switched off)	Stage 2 date (BBC One, STV, Channel 4, Channel 5 switched off)
Bressay Relay transmitters: Baltasound; Collafirth Hill; Fetlar; Fitful Head; Scalloway; Swinister; Voe; Weisdale	Pink banners on lampposts in Baltasound remind residents about the digital switchover in The Shetland Islands	5 May 2010	19 May 2010
Keelylang Hill Relay transmitters: Burgar Hill HP; Burgar Hill VP; Pierowall	The Orkney Islands	12 May 2010	26 May 2010
Rumster Forest Relay transmitters: Ben Tongue; Durness; Melvich; Thurso	Caithness	2 June 2010	16 June 2010
Eitshal Relay transmitters: Badachro; Kinlochbervie HP; Kinlochbervie VP; Lochinver; Ness of Lewis; Poolewe; Staffin; Ullapool	Lewis, Wester Ross, North West Sutherland and parts of Harris and Skye	7 July 2010	21 July 2010
Skriaig Relay transmitters: Ardintoul; Attadale; Borve; Bruernish; Clettraval; Daliburgh; Duncraig; Inverarish; Kilbride South Uist; Kylerhea; Lochmaddy HP; Lochmaddy VP; Penifiler; Scoval HP; Scoval VP; Tarbert Harris; Uig	Skye, Harris, North Uist, Benbecula, South Uist and parts of Barra	14 July 2010	28 July 2010
Angus Relay transmitters: Auchtermuchty; Balmullo; Balnaguard; Blair; Atholl; Camperdown; Carie; Crieff; Cupar; Dunkeld; Dunkeld Town; Grandtully; Kenmore; Killin HP; Killin VP; Lindores; Lochearnhead; Methven; Perth; Pitlochry; St Fillans; Strathallan; Tay Bridge; Tummel Bridge	Angus, Dundee, Perth and parts of Fife	4 August 2010	18 August 2010
Durris Relay transmitters: Balgownie; Banff; Boddam; Braemar; Brechin; Ellon; Gartley Moor; Gourdon; Lumphanan; Peterhead; Rosehearty; Tomintoul; Tullich	Aberdeen City, Aberdeenshire	1 September 2010	15 September 2010
Knockmore Relay transmitters: Aviemore; Avoch; Balblair Wood; Craigellachie; Grantown; Kingussie; Lairg	Moray, Strathspey and parts of Easter Ross	8 September 2010	22 September 2010
Rosemarkie Relay transmitters: Auchmore Wood; Cromarty; Fodderty; Fort Augustus; Glen Convinth; Glen Urquhart HP; Glen Urquhart VP; Inverness; Tomatin; Tomich; Tomich Link; Wester Erchite	Inverness and the Great Glen	6 October 2010	20 October 2010

=== Channel Islands ===
Transmitter(s)	Area served	BBC One, BBC Two, ITV1, Channel 4 switched off
Frémont Point Relay transmitters: Alderney; Gorey; Les Touillets; Saint Brélade; Saint Helier; Saint Peter Port; Torteval	The Channel Islands	17 November 2010

Due to close proximity to France, a multi-stage switchover was deemed impossible. Instead, the switchover was done in a single day. As such, all analogue signals were switched off at around 01:30, while digital signals were switched on at Frémont Point before 06:00 and at its relay transmitters before 15:00.

=== STV Central ===
Transmitter(s)	Area served	Stage 1 date (BBC Two switched off)	Stage 2 date (BBC One, STV, Channel 4, Channel 5 switched off)
Torosay Relay transmitters: Acharacle; Arisaig; Ballachulish; Bellanoch; Castlebay; Cow Hill; Dalmally; Dychliemore Link; Fiunary; Glengorm; Kilmelford; Kinlochleven; Kintraw; Loch Feochan; Mallaig; Oban; Onich; Spean Bridge; Strontian; Taynuilt; Tayvallich	South west Highlands and Islands	13 October 2010	27 October 2010
Darvel Relay transmitters: Ardentinny; Arrochar; Ayr South; Blackwaterfoot; Bowmore HP; Bowmore VP; Campbeltown; Carradale; Catrine; Claonaig; Dunure; Girvan; High Keil; Holmhead; Kirkmichael; Kirkoswald HP; Kirkoswold VP; Lethanhill; Lochgoilhead; Lochgoilhead AD; Lochwinnoch; Millburn Muir; Muirkirk; Port Ellen; Portnahaven; Sorn; Troon; Wanlockhead	Parts of central Scotland, Argyll and Bute	11 May 2011	25 May 2011
Rosneath HP	Rosneath	11 May 2011	25 May 2011
Rosneath VP Relay transmitters: Ardnadam; Garelochhead	Rosneath	11 May 2011	25 May 2011
Craigkelly Relay transmitters: Aberfoyle; Canongate HP; Canongate VP; Grangemouth; Kinross; Newbattle; Penicuik; West Linton	Lothian, parts of Edinburgh and parts of Fife	1 June 2011	15 June 2011
Black Hill Relay transmitters: Abington; Biggar; Bridge of Allan; Broughton; Callander; Cathcart; Clachan; Cumbernauld Village; Deanston; Dollar; Dunoon; Easdale; Fintry; Gigha Island; Glasgow West Central; Glespin; Haddington; Kelvindale; Killearn	Glasgow, central Scotland and parts of Edinburgh	8 June 2011	22 June 2011

=== Anglia ===
Transmitter(s)	Area served	Stage 1 date (BBC Two switched off)	Stage 2 date (BBC One, ITV1, Channel 4, Channel 5 switched off)
Sandy Heath Relay transmitters: Dallington Park; Kimpton; Luton	Cambridgeshire, Northamptonshire and Bedfordshire	30 March 2011	13 April 2011
Sudbury Relay transmitters: ~~Burnham-on-Crouch~~ (new digital transmitter site); ~~Clacton~~ (new digital transmitter site); Felixstowe; Ipswich Stoke; ~~Rouncefall~~ (new digital transmitter site); Somersham; Wivenhoe Park; Woodbridge	Parts of Suffolk and Essex	6 July 2011	20 July 2011
Tacolneston Relay transmitters: Aldeburgh; Bramford; Burnham; Bury St Edmunds; Creake; Gorleston on Sea; Great Yarmouth; King's Lynn; Linnet Valley; Little Walsingham; Lowestoft; Norwich Central; Overstrand; Thetford; Wells-next-the-Sea; West Runton	Norfolk and north Suffolk	9 November 2011	23 November 2011

=== Central ===
Transmitter(s)	Area served	Stage 1 date (BBC Two switched off)	Stage 2 date (BBC One, ITV1, Channel 4, Channel 5 switched off)
Nottingham	The Nottingham area	30 March 2011	13 April 2011
Bromsgrove	The Bromsgrove area	6 April 2011	20 April 2011
Lark Stoke	Stratford upon Avon area	6 April 2011	20 April 2011
Ridge Hill (Central) Relay transmitters: Andoversford; Eardiston; Ewyas Harold; Garth Hill HP; Garth Hill VP; Hazler Hill; Hereford; Hope under Dinmore; Kington; Knucklas; Ludlow; New Radnor; Oakeley Mynd; Peterchurch; Presteigne; Ross-on-Wye; St Briavels; Upper Soudley	Herefordshire and south Shropshire	6 April 2011	20 April 2011
The Wrekin Relay transmitters: Bucknell; Clun; Coalbrookdale; Haden Hill; Halesowen	North Shropshire and south Cheshire	6 April 2011	20 April 2011
Waltham Relay transmitters: Ambergate; Ashbourne; Ashford-in-the-Water; Belper; Birchover; Bolehill; Darley Dale; Derby; Eastwood; Leicester; Little Eaton; Matlock; Parwich; Stamford; Stanton Moor	Parts of Derbyshire, Leicestershire, Lincolnshire and south Nottinghamshire	17 August 2011	31 August 2011
Fenton	Stoke-on-Trent and Newcastle-under-Lyme	7 September 2011	21 September 2011
Sutton Coldfield Relay transmitters: Allesley Park; Brailes; Bretch Hill; Bridgnorth; Brierley Hill; Cheadle; Earl Sterndale; Edgbaston; ~~Fenton~~ (see above); Gib Heath; Gravelly Hill; Hamstead; Harborne; Hartington; Ipstones Edge; Ironbridge; Kenilworth; Kidderminster; Kinver; Royal Leamington Spa; Leek; Long Compton	much of the West Midlands	7 September 2011	21 September 2011
Oxford Relay transmitters: Ascott-under-Wychwood; Charlbury; Guiting Power; Icomb Hill; Over Norton	Oxfordshire, parts of Berkshire and Buckinghamshire	14 September 2011	28 September 2011

=== Yorkshire ===
Transmitter(s)	Area served	Stage 1 date (BBC Two switched off)	Stage 2 date (BBC One, ITV1, Channel 4, Channel 5 switched off)
Belmont Relay transmitters: Grimsby; Lincoln Central; Weaverthorpe	Lincolnshire and East Yorkshire	3 August 2011	17 August 2011
Oliver's Mount Relay transmitters: Humanby	The Scarborough area	3 August 2011	17 August 2011
Chesterfield Relay transmitters: Brockwell; Dronfield; Hasland	The Chesterfield area	10 August 2011	24 August 2011
Sheffield Relay transmitters: Totley Rise	The Sheffield area	10 August 2011	24 August 2011
Emley Moor Relay transmitters: Addingham; Armitage Bridge; Batley; Beecroft Hill; Blackburn in Rotherham; Bradford West; Calver Peak; Cleckheaton; Conisbrough; Cop Hill; Copley; Cornholme; Cowling; Cragg Vale; Cullingworth; Edale; Elland; Grassington; Hagg Wood; Halifax; Headingley; Hebden Bridge; Heyshaw; Holmfield; Holmfirth; Hope; Idle; Keighley; Keighley Town; Kettlewell; Longwood Edge; Luddenden; Lydgate; Millhouse Green; Oughtibridge; Oxenhope; Primrose Hill; Ripponden; Shatton Edge; Skipton Town; Skipton; Stocksbridge; Sutton in Craven; Tideswell Moor; Todmorden; Walsden; Walsden South; Wharfedale; Wheatley; Wincobank	Most of Yorkshire	7 September 2011	21 September 2011

=== Meridian ===
Transmitter(s)	Area served	Stage 1 date (BBC Two switched off)	Stage 2 date (BBC One, ITV1, Channel 4, Channel 5 switched off)
Hannington Relay transmitters: Aldbourne; Alton; Chisbury; Hemdean HP; Hemdean VP; Hurstbourne Tarrant; Lambourn; The Bournes; Tidworth	Parts of Hampshire, Berkshire and Surrey	8 February 2012	22 February 2012
Midhurst Relay transmitters: Haslemere; Steyning	Much of West Sussex	29 February 2012	14 March 2012
Rowridge Relay transmitters: Bovington; Brading; Brighstone; Canford Heath; Cheselbourne; Corfe Castle; Donhead St Mary; Donhead St Andrew; Findon; Horndean; Luccombe; Lulworth; Luscombe Valley; Millbrook HP; Millbrook VP; Piddletrenthide; Poole; Poulner; Salisbury; Shrewton; Singleton; Sutton Row; Till Valley; Ventnor; Westbourne; Winterbourne Steepleton; Winterborne Stickland	Hampshire, the Isle of Wight, parts of Dorset, Wiltshire and West Sussex	7 March 2012	21 March 2012
Whitehawk Hill	The Brighton area	7 March 2012	21 March 2012
Hastings	The Hastings area	30 May 2012	13 June 2012
Heathfield	East Sussex	30 May 2012	13 June 2012
Tunbridge Wells	The Tunbridge Wells area	30 May 2012	13 June 2012
Bluebell Hill	North Kent and south Essex	13 June 2012	27 June 2012
Dover	South and east Kent	13 June 2012	27 June 2012

=== London ===
Transmitter(s)	Area served	Stage 1 date (BBC Two switched off)	Stage 2 date (BBC One, ITV1, Channel 4, Channel 5 switched off)
Crystal Palace	Greater London and parts of the Home Counties	4 April 2012	18 April 2012

=== Tyne Tees ===
Transmitter(s)	Area served	Stage 1 date (BBC Two switched off)	Stage 2 date (BBC One, ITV1, Channel 4, Channel 5 switched off)
Bilsdale Relay transmitters: Aislaby; Bainbridge; Castleton; Eston Nab; Grinton Lodge; Guisborough; Limber Hill; Peterlee; Ravenscar; Romaldkirk; Rookhope; Rosedale Abbey; Skinningrove; West Burton; Whitby	Teesside, County Durham and much of North Yorkshire	12 September 2012	26 September 2012
Chatton Relay transmitters: Berwick-upon-Tweed; Rothbury; Wooler	North Northumberland	12 September 2012	26 September 2012
Pontop Pike Relay transmitters: Allenheads; Alston; Bellingham; Blaydon; Byrness; Catton Beacon; Durham; Esh; Falstone; Felling; Fenham; Haltwhistle; Haydon Bridge; Hedleyhope; Humshaugh; Ireshopeburn; Kielder; Morpeth; Newton, Northumberland; Seaham; Shotleyfield; Staithes; Sunderland; Wall; Weardale; Whitaside	Tyne and Wear and County Durham	12 September 2012	26 September 2012

=== UTV ===
Transmitter(s)	Area served	Stage 1 date (BBC Two switched off)	Stage 2 date (BBC One, UTV, Channel 4, Channel 5 switched off)
Brougher Mountain Relay transmitters: Belcoo; Derrygonnelly; Ederny; Lisbellaw	South West Northern Ireland	10 October 2012	24 October 2012
Divis Relay transmitters: Armagh; Banbridge; Bangor; Bellair; Benagh; Camlough; Carnmoney Hill; Conlig; Cushendall; Cushendun; Draperstown; Dromore; Glenariff; Glynn; Kilkeel; Killowen Mountain; Larne; Leitrim; Moneymore; Newcastle; Newry North; Newry South; Newtownards; Rostrevor Forest; Whitehead	Belfast and the surrounding area	10 October 2012	24 October 2012
Limavady Relay transmitters: Ballintoy; Ballycastle; Buckna; Bushmills; Castlederg; Claudy; Glenelly Valley; Gortnageeragh; Gortnalee; Derry; Muldonagh; Plumbridge; Strabane	North West Northern Ireland	10 October 2012	24 October 2012

Northern Ireland completed the digital switchover on the same day as the Republic of Ireland, with Northern Ireland switching off analogue transmissions shortly before midnight, and the Republic of Ireland shortly after 10am. Viewers in some areas are able to receive an additional multiplex of channels carrying RTÉ One, RTÉ2 and TG4. These are broadcast in DVB-T2, and despite not being in high definition, require a Freeview HD receiver. Viewers in much of Northern Ireland can receive these and other Irish channels directly from Saorview transmitters based in the Republic. As these are broadcast in MPEG4, a Freeview HD receiver is generally required, although a very small number of standard Freeview receivers are compatible. Almost all viewers in Northern Ireland are able to receive at least some channels from the Republic by one or both of these means.

== See also ==
- Digital terrestrial television in the United Kingdom
- Digital changeover dates in New Zealand
