= Storeton transmitting station =

Radio and TV transmission site in England

Storeton
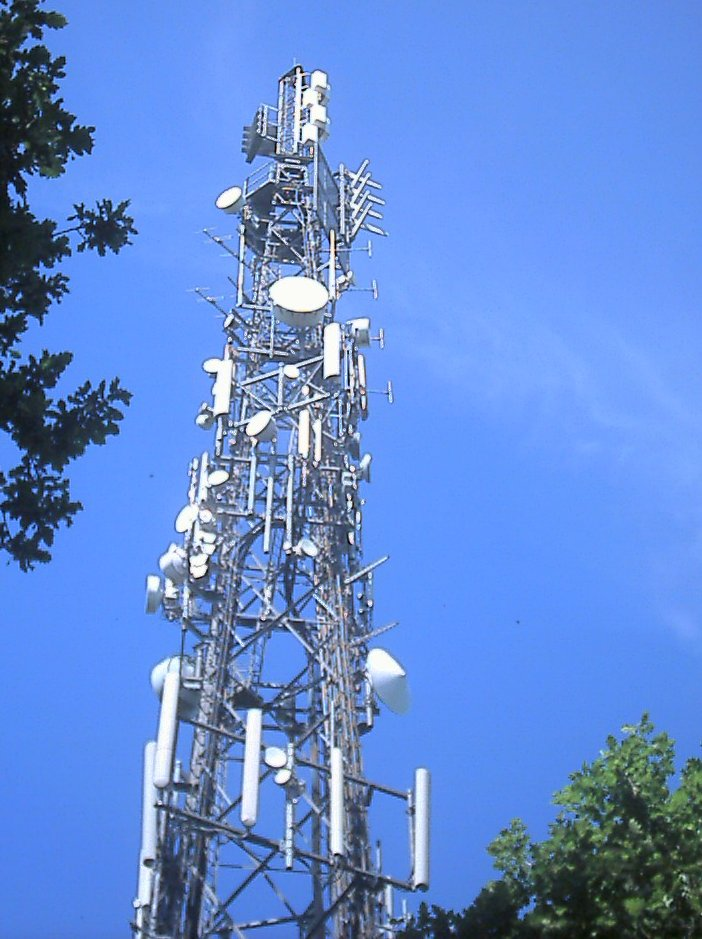
- Storeton transmitting tower, May 2009

- Location within Merseyside
- Tower height: 45 metres (148 ft)
- Coordinates: 53.3499°N 3.03117°W
- Grid reference: SJ314841
- Built: 1980
- Relay of: Winter Hill (1980-present); Moel-y-Parc (2009-present)
- BBC region: BBC North West (1980-present); BBC Wales (2009-present)
- ITV region: ITV Granada (1980-present); ITV Cymru Wales (2009-present)

Storeton transmitting station (also commonly known as the Storeton transmitter) is a television transmitter being a member of both the Winter Hill group of transmitters and of the Moel-y-Parc group of transmitter (public service multiplexes only), and an FM radio transmitter, with transmitting antennas affixed to a mast located on Storeton Ridge, Higher Bebington, Wirral, UK (national grid reference: SJ314841). The site is owned and operated by Arqiva. It was originally solely an analogue TV relay of the Winter Hill transmitter. The 45 metre-high (150 ft-high) mast is situated at an elevation of 65.5 metres (215 ft). Thus, the top of the mast has an overall height of 110.5 metres (363 ft) above sea level. Construction of the mast was completed in 1980. As of 2009, the TV transmitter serves approximately 45,000 homes.

== History ==
The Storeton site was not an original VHF 405-line transmitter location. For 625-line analogue services on UHF, the relay covered Winter Hill blind spots in low lying areas across the Mersey in south Liverpool and some densely populated areas of Wirral. Prior to digital switchover, all five analogue channels and all six digital multiplexes were broadcast from the site. As a member of the Winter Hill transmitter group, the transmitter is in the BBC North West region and the ITV Granada Channel 3 service licence region, and as a member of the Moel-y-Parc transmitter group, the transmitter is in the BBC Wales region and the ITV Cymru Wales Channel 3 service licence region. The commercial local TV station Liverpool TV with studios in Toxteth, Liverpool, and the commercial dual-regional radio station Capital North West and Wales with studios in Gwersyllt, Wrexham, are also broadcast from the site.

Although located in England, the site is within eight miles of the North Wales coast. In coordination with digital TV switchover in North Wales during November 2009, the site commenced service as part of the Moel-y-Parc transmitter group, transmitting the Wales region version of the public service multiplexes to nearby parts of North East Wales, across the River Dee. In official OFCOM documentation the transmitter is listed as Storeton Wales for this purpose. Parts of those areas were previously poorly served with Welsh television services from Moel-y-Parc due to local geography, as natural landforms such as hills can block radio waves from being received, resulting in poor quality radio and television reception or even none at all, depending on the frequencies being used.

The final switchover date for Storeton as part of the Winter Hill transmitter group was 2 December 2009. The official date for Storeton joining the Moel-y-Parc transmitter group with the addition of the three Wales public service multiplexes was 25 November 2009, although there were subsequent changes for those multiplex transmissions on 2 December 2009 with limited publicity.

Since the transition from analogue TV to digital TV broadcasts, the Storeton site is not a relay of either Winter Hill or Moel-y-Parc because it does not receive its signals over the air from the main transmitter sites but is "line-fed" the ten multiplexes by fibre optic cable.

== Services available ==
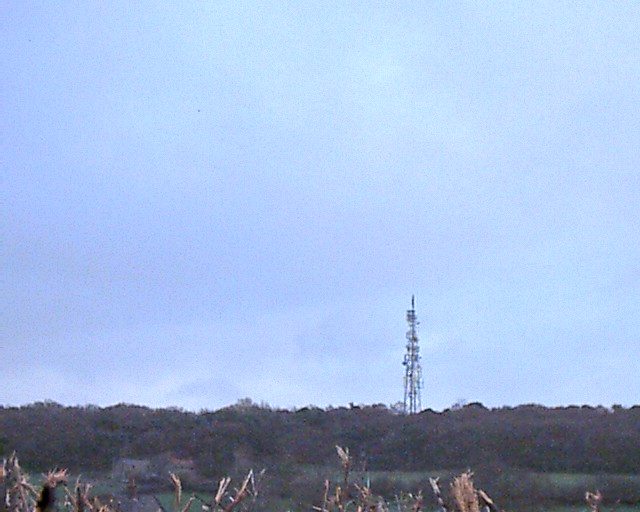
The tower as seen from a distance, December 2001

=== Analogue radio ===
Frequency	Polarization	ERP / kW	Service
97.1 MHz	Mixed	1.0	Capital North West and Wales

The radio transmission licence for the Capital North West and Wales service from both the Storeton transmitter on 97.1 MHz and the Wrecsam-Rhos transmitter on 103.4 MHz, filed under "Capital Wrexham and Chester", was awarded to Marcher Radio Group Limited (a subsidiary of Global Radio Limited) and is valid until 4 September 2027.

The coverage area of the transmission can be seen on the Ofcom "Wrexham and Deeside FM Measured Coverage Area" document (page 5).

=== Digital television ===
Frequency	UHF	Polarization	ERP / kW	Operator	BBC region	ITV region	System
482.000 MHz	22	V	0.56	BBC B	BBC North West	ITV Granada	DVB-T2 (QAM/256)
490.000 MHz	23	V	0.56	SDN	—	—	DVB-T (QAM/64)
506.000 MHz	25	V	0.56	Digital 3&4	—	ITV Granada	DVB-T (QAM/64)
514.000 MHz	26	V	0.56	Arqiva A	—	—	DVB-T (QAM/64)
530.000 MHz	28	V	0.56	BBC A	BBC North West	—	DVB-T (QAM/64)
546.000 MHz	30	V	0.56	Arqiva B	—	—	DVB-T (QAM/64)
618.166 MHz	39+	H	3.0	Digital 3&4	—	ITV Cymru Wales	DVB-T (QAM/64)
642.000 MHz	42	H	3.0	BBC B	BBC Wales	ITV Cymru Wales	DVB-T2 (QAM/256)
650.000 MHz	43	V	0.06	LL (Liverpool TV)	—	—	DVB-T (QPSK)
666.000 MHz	45	H	3.0	BBC A	BBC Wales	—	DVB-T (QAM/64)

The frequency assignments for the Storeton multiplexes (most recent changes were on 12 August 2020) are taken from the UK Digital "700 MHZ Clearance Events - Granada region" document (page 5, "The Storeton Transmitter").

The frequency assignments for the Storeton Wales multiplexes (most recent changes were on 27 February 2019) are taken from the UK Digital "700 MHZ Clearance Events - Wales region" document (page 34, "Storeton Wales", relay of the Moel-y-Parc transmitter).

With the changes on 27 February 2009 for the Storeton Wales multiplexes, when the corresponding frequency of each multiplex became the same as that transmitted from Moel-y-Parc, also accompanied by an increase in effective radiated power from 2.0 kW to 3.0 kw, the Storeton Wales transmissions each became a constituent part of a single-frequency network (SFN), resulting in a significant improvement in reception quality at locations where signals were being received from both sites but where neither was consistently adequate.

== Former services ==
=== Analogue television transmissions until switchover ===
Frequency	UHF	Polarization	ERP / kW	Service
479.25 MHz	22	V	2.8	BBC1 North West
503.25 MHz	25	V	2.8	Granada
527.25 MHz	28	V	2.8	BBC2 North West
559.25 MHz	32	V	2.8	Channel 4
615.25 MHz	39	V	2.8	Channel 5

Transmission of BBC1 North West, BBC2 North West, and Granada commenced in September 1979. Transmission of Channel 4 began in July 1983. Transmission of Channel 5 began from the launch of the Channel 5 service its-self on 30 March 1997.

=== Digital television transmissions until switchover ===
Frequency	UHF	Polarization	ERP / kW	Operator	Region
490.166 MHz	23+	V	0.056	SDN (Mux A)	—
514.166 MHz	26+	V	0.056	BBC (Mux B)	North West
538.166 MHz	29+	V	0.056	Arqiva (Mux C)	—
546.166 MHz	30+	V	0.056	BBC (Mux 1)	North West
570.166 MHz	33+	V	0.056	Arqiva (Mux D)	—
578.166 MHz	34+	V	0.056	Digital 3&4 (Mux 2)	Granada

=== Digital television transmissions following switchover ===
Frequency	UHF	Polarization	ERP / kW	Operator	Region
482.0 MHz	22	V	0.56	BBC B	North West
490.0 MHz	23	V	0.56	SDN	
506.0 MHz	25	V	0.56	Digital 3&4	Granada
514.0 MHz	26	V	0.56	Arqiva A	—
530.0 MHz	28	V	0.56	BBC A	North West
538.0 MHz	29	V	0.56	Arqiva B	—
730.0 MHz	53	H	0.50	Digital 3&4	Wales
762.0 MHz	57	H	0.50	BBC A	Wales
786.0 MHz	60	H	0.50	BBC B	Wales

== See also ==
- Moel-y-Parc transmitting station
- Winter Hill transmitting station
- West Kirby transmitting station
