= Ammanford transmitting station =

Telecommunications broadcast facility in Wales

Ammanford
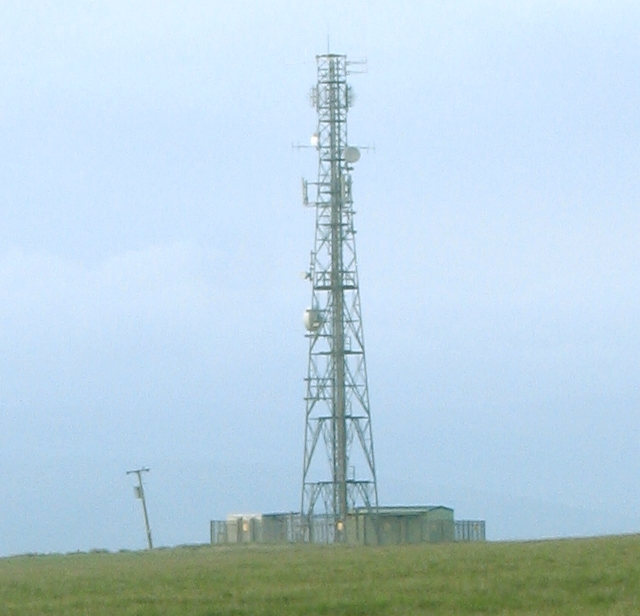

- Location within Carmarthenshire
- Mast height: 30 metres (98 ft)
- Coordinates: 51.78116°N 3.94171°W
- Grid reference: SN661109
- Built: 1968
- BBC region: BBC Wales (1968-1983)

The Ammanford transmitting station is a broadcasting and telecommunications facility located on Mynydd y Betws about 6 km (4 mi) to the south east of the town of Ammanford, in Carmarthenshire, Wales (grid reference SN661109). The building was originally built by Messrs. T. Richard Jones of Ammanford for the BBC, entering service in 1968 acting as a relay transmitter for the now-defunct 405-line VHF television system.

The site has a self-standing 30 m (100 ft) lattice tower erected on land that is itself about 330 m (1,100 ft) above sea level. The television broadcast primarily covered the towns of Ammanford, Brynamman, Cwmamman and indeed much of the valley of the Amman river.

405-line television from this site was shut down in 1983. From this point onwards, the site has handled telecommunications services only (including service as a mobile phone mast).

== Services listed by frequency ==
=== Analogue television ===
==== 21 October 1968 - Second Quarter 1983 ====
Frequency	VHF	kW	Service
209.75 MHz	12	0.02	BBC1 Wales

== See also ==
- List of masts
- List of radio stations in the United Kingdom
- List of tallest buildings and structures in Great Britain
