= This is the Coast =

- England
- Broadcast area: Scarborough, Whitby, Filey & Bridlington
- Frequencies: DAB+: 10C (North Yorkshire Multiplex) (213.360 MHz); DAB+: 12A (MuxCo Lincolnshire) (223.936 MHz)

Programming
- Format: AC

Ownership
- Owner: This is the Coast Limited

History
- First air date: 5 October 2020

Links
- Website: www.thisisthecoast.co.uk

This is the Coast is a local radio station serving the Yorkshire coastal areas of Scarborough, Filey, Whitby, Bridlington, and Hornsea.

== History ==
This is the Coast launched in October 2020 to provide a local radio service for the Yorkshire Coast after the area's previous local station, Yorkshire Coast Radio, became part of a national radio network.

Initially the station launched online and smart speakers before obtaining an Ofcom DAB licence later in the month.

== Programming ==
The station features locally focused content throughout all of its live programming hours, reacting to the events of the day.

Local presenters include Paddy Billington, Tom Hooper, Mike Nicholson, Darren Lethem, Tom Ironside, Richard Simister and Chris Johnson.

== News ==
This is the Coast broadcasts hourly news bulletins, with headlines on the half-hour during weekday breakfast.

The bulletins have a strong local focus with a team of in-house journalists also producing content for the station's website and smartphone app. The news team consists of Matthew Pells, Shaun Moore and Andrew Snaith.

National material is provided by Sky News Radio.

== Transmission ==
This is the Coast can be heard on DAB+ across North Yorkshire on the Muxco multiplex.

The station extended its coverage in March 2024 by joining the MuxCo Lincolnshire & Humberside DAB multiplex.

The station is also available online, on its own smartphone apps and on smart speakers.

== See also ==
- Coast & County Radio
- Radio Scarborough
