= Coast & County Radio =

Coordinates: 54.262299°N 0.416716°W

- Scarborough; England
- Broadcast area: Yorkshire Coast and Ryedale
- Frequencies: FM: 97.4 MHz - Scarborough; FM: 105.5 MHz - Whitby; FM: 106.7 MHz - Malton; DAB+: 10C (213.360 MHz) - North Yorkshire

Programming
- Format: Adult Hits

History
- First air date: 9 November 2016; 9 years ago

Technical information
- ERP: 0.050 kW FM (Scarborough); 0.025 kW FM (Whitby); 0.075 kW FM (Malton); 2kW DAB+ (Oliver’s Mount); 2kW DAB+ (Harrogate); 2kW DAB+ (Acklam Wold); 10kW DAB+ (Bilsdale)

Links
- Webcast: Website Player
- Website: Official website

Coast & County Radio (also referred to as Coast and County Radio) is a community radio station, primarily serving the Yorkshire Coast and Ryedale areas of England. It was launched on 9 November 2016 on the MuxCo North Yorkshire DAB multiplex. DAB transmissions ceased on 1 January 2019, when the station became online only. It has studios in Scarborough and Malton.

In September 2020 it was announced that the station would start broadcasting to Scarborough on 97.4 FM, from the Oliver's Mount transmitter. The FM test broadcasts began in October 2020, with the programme service beginning on 2 November 2020.

In August 2021 plans were announced to extend coverage. With additional FM transmitters proposed for Whitby and Ravenscar. The Whitby transmitter, located at the Whitby Town F.C. ground came into service early November 2021. The switch on date for the Ravenscar transmitter has yet to be published.

On 16 November 2024 the station began broadcasting once again on the MuxCo North Yorkshire DAB multiplex, this time using the DAB+ standard and the following month the station was given permission by Ofcom to extend its broadcast area into Ryedale.

== See also ==
- Radio Scarborough
- This is The Coast
