= Wrexham-Rhos transmitting station =

Television and radio broadcast facility in Wales

Wrexham-Rhos
- Location within Wrexham
- Mast height: 45 metres (148 ft)
- Coordinates: 53.0762°N 3.045°W
- Grid reference: SJ3000153762
- Built: 1977
- Relay of: Moel-y-Parc
- BBC region: BBC Wales
- ITV region: ITV Cymru Wales

The Wrexham-Rhos transmitting station is a digital television relay of Moel-y-Parc, and forms part of the Wales television region. Despite its name, the station is situated in Moss Village and serves the city of Wrexham, the northern area of Wrexham County Borough and south-western Flintshire. It is a free-standing lattice tower structure serving around 85,000 homes which are unable to receive broadcasts from Moel-y-Parc due to Hope Mountain.

This area is traditionally served by English transmitters at Winter Hill and The Wrekin, which have historically provided English-language channels Channel 4 and Channel 5, plus the digital terrestrial services ONdigital/ITV Digital (from 1998 to 2002) and Freeview from 2002 onwards. Wrexham-Rhos was constructed to coincide with the 1977 National Eisteddfod in Wrexham, initially providing S4C and BBC One Wales, later joined by HTV Wales in 1997 and BBC Two Wales in 1999.

The DAB digital radio transmitter on the site was switched on in 2013. It had a temporary outage in 2017.

== Services available ==
=== Analogue television ===
==== 1977 - 1 November 1982 ====
Frequency	UHF	kW	Service
615.25 MHz	39	0.2	BBC1 Wales
839.25 MHz	67	0.4	HTV Wales

==== 1 November 1982 - 30 March 1997 ====
Frequency	UHF	kW	Service
615.25 MHz	39	0.2	BBC1 Wales
839.25 MHz	67	0.4	S4C

==== 30 March 1997 - 1999 ====
Frequency	UHF	kW	Service
559.25 MHz	32	0.2	HTV Wales
615.25 MHz	39	0.2	BBC1 Wales
839.25 MHz	67	0.4	S4C

==== 1999 - 2000 ====
Frequency	UHF	kW	Service
527.25 MHz	28	0.2	BBC2 Wales
559.25 MHz	32	0.2	HTV Wales
615.25 MHz	39	0.2	BBC1 Wales
839.25 MHz	67	0.4	S4C

==== 2000 - 28 October 2009 ====
Prior to analogue switch-off, Wrexham-Rhos broadcast four of the five national terrestrial stations. Channels 1 to 3 were broadcast at 200 W ERP, while S4C was broadcast at 400 W. In 1998, due to the upcoming launch of ONdigital from neighbouring transmission site, Winter Hill, S4C from the relay was required to change frequency (from UHF Channel 67) two years later. A message was displayed telling viewers to re-tune their televisions of the channel were carried for a couple of months. When the original frequency was switched off, the power on the newer version was increased.

Frequency	UHF	kW	Service
503.25 MHz	25	0.4	S4C
527.25 MHz	28	0.2	BBC2 Wales
559.25 MHz	32	0.2	HTV Wales
615.25 MHz	39	0.2	BBC1 Wales

=== Analogue and digital television ===
==== 28 October 2009 - 25 November 2009 ====
BBC2 was ceased on UHF 28. BBC A launched on the old BBC2 Frequency.

Frequency	UHF	kW	Service	System
503.25 MHz	25	0.4	S4C	PAL System I
530.000 MHz	28	0.08	BBC A	DVB-T
559.25 MHz	32	0.2	HTV Wales	PAL System I
615.25 MHz	39	0.2	BBC1 Wales	PAL System I

=== Digital television ===
==== 25 November 2009 - present ====
At present, the station broadcasts three of the six national digital terrestrial television multiplexes on the "Freeview Lite" service. The station switched over to digital transmissions from analogue throughout November 2009, and remaining analogue services ceased at midnight on 25 November 2009. BBC A and Digital 3&4 broadcast using MPEG2 compression on DVB-T standards, whilst the HD multiplex, BBC B, uses DVB-T2.

Frequency	UHF	kW	Operator
482.000 MHz	22	0.08	Digital 3&4
506.000 MHz	25	0.08	BBC B
530.000 MHz	28	0.08	BBC A

=== Analogue radio (FM VHF) ===
Frequency	kW	Service
88.0 MHz	1.4	Heart North and Mid Wales
95.4 MHz	0.7	BBC Radio Wales
103.4 MHz	1.4	Capital North West and Wales

=== Digital radio (DAB) ===
Frequency	Block	kw	Operator
215.072 MHz	10D	3kW	MuxCo North East Wales & West Cheshire†

On air date March 2013

== See also ==
- Winter Hill transmitting station
- The Wrekin transmitting station
