= Moel y Parc transmitting station =

Telecommunications transmission site in north-east Wales

Moel-y-Parc
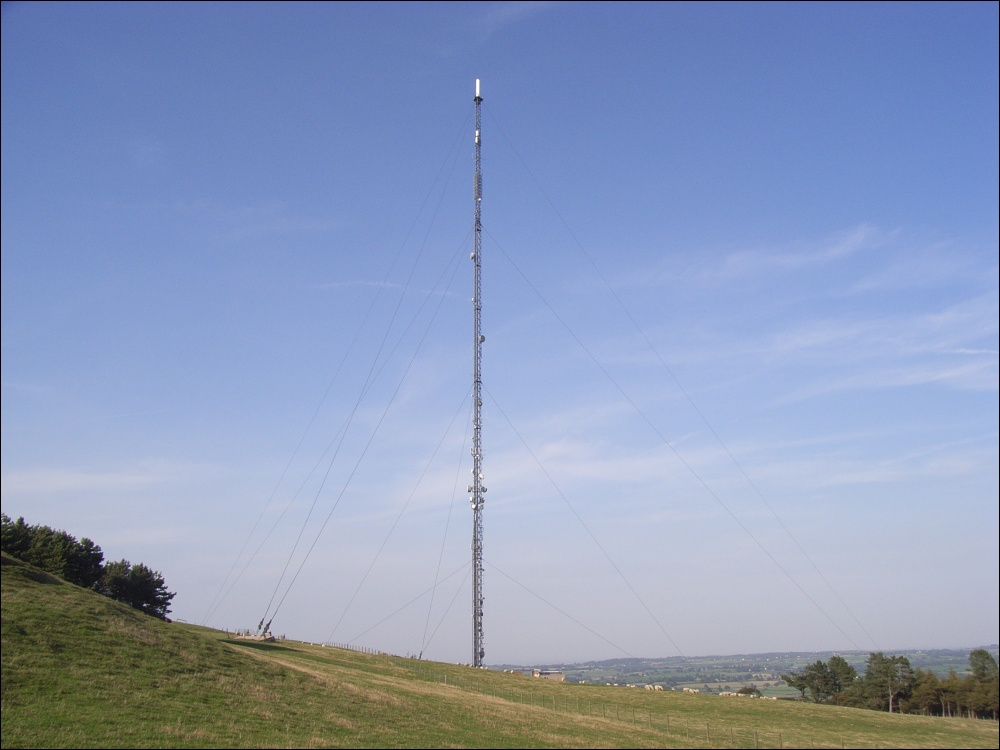
- Moel Y Parc transmitter

- Location within Flintshire
- Mast height: 235 metres (771 ft)
- Coordinates: 53.221111°N 3.314444°W
- Grid reference: SJ123702
- Built: 1963
- BBC region: BBC Wales
- ITV region: ITV Cymru Wales

The Moel-y-Parc transmitting station is situated on Moel y Parc, a hill in north-east Wales at the northern end of the Clwydian range, close to the town of Caerwys and several miles (kilometres) north-east of Denbigh. It was built in 1962/1963 by the ITA to bring 405-line VHF ITV television to North Wales and it has been on the air since 1963. Its original height of 229 metres (751 ft) made it the tallest structure in North Wales and it stands on land that is itself about 335 metres (1,099 ft) above sea level. In 1965, VHF television transmissions from the BBC commenced from the site.

With the addition of the UHF aerials in 1969, the mast height increased to 235 metres (771 ft) high. Its official coverage area includes parts of Flintshire, Denbighshire and Wrexham (although the majority of Wrexham is in a blind spot of direct transmission from Moel-y-Parc, its analogue transmissions were relayed via the Wrexham-Rhos transmitting station). A network of relay stations extends television coverage as far as Colwyn Bay in the west and Bala in the south.

VHF television services from both BBC and ITV were discontinued in January 1985 as the 405-line TV system was switched off across the UK as a whole.

Moel-y-Parc's UHF channel allocation made it a "Group B" transmitter, but with the roll-out of the UK's first digital TV services in 1998, a "Group W" wideband aerial was needed. The site reverted to being a "Group B" transmitter at digital switchover (DSO). Technically, with the advent of the temporary MUXES 7 and 8 Moel Y Parc became a K group, and is due to remain so at its 700 MHz clearance. However most B group aerials will still work on all Moel's transmitted DTT channels.

The site is currently operated by Arqiva.

== Channels listed by frequency ==
=== Analogue television ===
==== 28 January 1963 – 28 October 1965 ====
The ITV 405-line television service commenced with Teledu Cymru on 28 January 1963.

One year later, Wales (West and North) Limited had collapsed financially, and the ITA awarded the franchise to provide the service from 27 January 1964 for the West and North Wales region to Television Wales and West, the holder of the franchise for the South Wales and West of England region.

Frequency	VHF	kW	Service
204.75 MHz	11	25	Teledu Cymru until 1964 TWW from 1964

==== 28 October 1965 – 5 July 1969 ====
BBC 405-line TV was added, obtaining its signal from an SHF link on the Great Orme which picked up the signal from Llanddona on Anglesey.

Until the mid-1960s, it had been common practice for BBC and ITV transmitters to be hosted from different masts. Moel-y-Parc had been engineered to take both services and be capable of the UHF transmission when they arrived. Additionally (and unusually) the BBC's VHF television transmissions were on Band III as were the ITA's transmissions. Having both services on the same mast meant that the region's viewers only needed one aerial.

This was the final BBC VHF television "main station" to be commissioned. The BBC published a technical report on the mast and its aerials.

Frequency	VHF	kW	Service
179.75 MHz	6	15	BBC1 Wales
204.75 MHz	11	25	TWW until March 1968 ITSWW from March 1968 until May 1968 HTV Wales from May 1968

==== 5 July 1969 - 1973 ====
Frequency	VHF	UHF	kW	Service
179.75 MHz	6	—	15	BBC1 Wales
204.75 MHz	11	—	25	HTV Wales
663.25 MHz	—	45	100	BBC2 Wales

==== 1973 - 1 November 1982 ====
BBC1 & ITV transmissions launched on UHF.

Frequency	VHF	UHF	kW	Service
179.75 MHz	6	—	15	BBC1 Wales
204.75 MHz	11	—	25	HTV Wales
663.25 MHz	—	45	100	BBC2 Wales
695.25 MHz	—	49	100	HTV Wales
719.25 MHz	—	52	100	BBC1 Wales

==== 1 November 1982 – 3 January 1985 ====
Channel 4 was launched in the UK. Being in Wales, this transmitter radiated S4C

Frequency	VHF	UHF	kW	Service
179.75 MHz	6	—	15	BBC1 Wales
204.75 MHz	11	—	25	HTV Wales
639.25 MHz	—	42	100	S4C
663.25 MHz	—	45	100	BBC2 Wales
695.25 MHz	—	49	100	HTV Wales
719.25 MHz	—	52	100	BBC1 Wales

==== 3 January 1985 – 15 November 1998 ====
405-line television was switched off across the UK and both Moel-y-Parc's VHF transmitters ceased operation after 20 and 22 years of service for the BBC and ITV respectively.

Frequency	UHF	kW	Service	System
639.25 MHz	42	100	S4C	Pal System I
663.25 MHZ	45	100	BBC2 Wales	PAL
695.25 mhz	49	100	HTV Wales	PAL
719.25 mhz	52	100	BBC1 Wales	PAL

=== Analogue and digital television ===
==== 15 November 1998 – 28 October 2009 ====
This was where the DVB-T system was rolled out across the UK on the 15th of November 1998

Frequency	UHF	kW	Service	System
546.000 MHz	30	0.25	Arqiva (Mux C)	DVB-T
578.000 MHz	34	0.25	Arqiva (Mux D)	DVB-T
639.25 MHz	42	100	S4C	PAL System I
663.25 MHz	45	100	BBC2 Wales	PAL System I
695.25 MHz	49	100	HTV Wales	PAL System I
719.25 MHz	52	100	BBC1 Wales	PAL System I
738.000 MHz	54	1	BBC (Mux 1)	DVB-T
770.000 MHz	58	1	Digital 3&4 (Mux 2)	DVB-T
794.000 MHz	61	1	SDN (Mux A)	DVB-T
818.000 MHz	64	1	BBC (Mux B)	DVB-T

==== 28 October 2009 – 25 November 2009 ====
Frequency	UHF	kW	Service	System
546.000 MHz	30	0.25	Arqiva (Mux C)	DVB-T
578.000 MHz	34	0.25	Arqiva (Mux D)	DVB-T
639.25 MHz	42	100	S4C	PAL System I
666.000 MHz	45	20	BBC A	DVB-T
695.25 MHz	49	100	HTV Wales	PAL System I
719.25 MHz	52	100	BBC1 Wales	PAL System I
770.000 MHz	58	1	Digital 3&4 (Mux 2)	DVB-T
794.000 MHz	61	1	SDN (Mux A)	DVB-T
818.000 MHz	64	1	BBC (Mux B)	DVB-T

On the 28th of October 2009, BBC2 Wales analogue on UHF channel 45 was switched off after 40 years in service. Then BBC (A) was launched on BBC2 Wales's old channel number/ and the 54 1 BBC (Mux 1) DVB-T was switched off and replaced by BBC A on the old BBC2 Wales frequency. BBC A started on full power (20 kW), and from 8K at the start & QAM64

=== Digital television ===
==== 25 November 2009 – 14 November 2012 ====
As part of the digital switchover, analogue BBC2 Wales ceased transmission on 28 October 2009, followed by analogue BBC1 Wales, HTV Wales and S4C on 25 November 2009. They were replaced by higher powered digital transmissions.

Frequency	UHF	kW	Operator
642.000 MHz	42	20	BBC B
666.000 MHz	45	20	BBC A
689.833 MHz	48-	10	Arqiva B
698.166 MHz	49+	20	Digital 3&4
713.833 MHz	51-	10	SDN
722.000 MHz	52	12.5	Arqiva A

==== 14 November 2012 – 26 February 2019 ====
In coordination with changes to transmission frequencies elsewhere in the UK arising from the clearance of the 800 MHz band for 4G mobile phone use, Moel-y-Parc's "Digital 3&4" multiplex was moved from channel 49+ to channel 39+.

Frequency	UHF	kW	Operator
618.166 MHz	39+	20	Digital 3&4
642.000 MHz	42	20	BBC B
666.000 MHz	45	20	BBC A
689.833 MHz	48-	10	Arqiva B
713.833 MHz	51-	10	SDN
722.000 MHz	52	12.5	Arqiva A

==== 26 April 2017 ====
The transmission of the local television "LOC1" multiplex (DVB-t system with QPSK modulation) from Moel-y-Parc on UHF channel 56 with ERP of 2 kW commenced.

Although a licence had been issued in January 2014 to Bay TV Clwyd (subsequent to the launch of Bay TV Liverpool) to start a local television service for North East Wales from studios in Mold, it was not until 26 April 2017 that the successor company Made TV which had taken over the operations of bankrupt Bay TV, was able to launch the local television "LOC1" multiplex to carry the "Made in North Wales TV" service.

Local reaction to the launch was highly critical because production of programming was no longer to be in Mold within the licensed service area, but at the studios of "Made in Liverpool" in Toxteth, Liverpool.

==== 27 February 2019 – 11 August 2020 ====
In coordination with changes to transmission frequencies elsewhere in the UK arising from the clearance of the 700 MHz band for 5G mobile phone use, the following changes were implemented. The local TV "LOC1" multiplex (carrying North Wales TV) was moved from UHF channel 56 to UHF channel 27, and the transmission ERP increased from 2 kW to 3 kW. The "Arqiva A" multiplex was moved from UHF channel 52 to UHF channel 36. The national "COM7" multiplex was moved from UHF channel 32 to UHF channel 55 and the transmission ERP increased from 14 kW to 16 kW.

Frequency	UHF	kW	Operator	System
522.000 MHz	27	3	LTV (North Wales TV)	DVB-T (QPSK)
578.000 MHz	34	14	COM8	DVB-T2 (QAM/256)
594.000 MHz	36	10	Arqiva A	DVB-T (QAM/64)
618.166 MHz	39+	20	Digital 3&4	DVB-T (QAM/64)
642.000 MHz	42	20	BBC B	DVB-T2 (QAM/256)
666.000 MHz	45	20	BBC A	DVB-T (QAM/64)
689.833 MHz	48-	10	Arqiva B	DVB-T (QAM/64)
713.833 MHz	51-	10	SDN	DVB-T (QAM/64)
746.000 MHz	55	16	COM7	DVB-T2 (QAM/256)

With the changes on 27 February 2009, the corresponding frequency of each public service multiplex transmitted from Storeton was also changed to the same as that transmitted from Moel-y-Parc, thereby making each site a constituent part of a single-frequency network (SFN), resulting in a significant improvement in reception quality at locations where signals were being received from both sites but where neither was consistently adequate.

==== June 30, 2020 ====
The transmission of the national "COM8" multiplex from Moel-y-Parc on UHF channel 34 ceased.

A commercial decision had been taken by Arqiva to discontinue transmission of the national "COM8" multiplex having failed to obtain a response from Ofcom concerning the duration of the future availability of the transmission frequencies used.

==== 12 August 2020 - present ====
In coordination with changes to transmission frequencies elsewhere in the UK arising from the clearance of the 700 MHz band for 5G mobile phone use, Moel-y-Parc's "SDN" multiplex was moved from UHF channel 51 to UHF channel 33.

Frequency	UHF	kW	Operator	System
522.000 MHz	27	3	LTV (North Wales TV)	DVB-T (QPSK)
570.000 MHz	33	10	SDN	DVB-T (QAM/64)
594.000 MHz	36	10	Arqiva A	DVB-T (QAM/64)
618.166 MHz	39+	20	Digital 3&4	DVB-T (QAM/64)
642.000 MHz	42	20	BBC B	DVB-T2 (QAM/256)
666.000 MHz	45	20	BBC A	DVB-T (QAM/64)
689.833 MHz	48-	10	Arqiva B	DVB-T (QAM/64)
746.000 MHz	55	16	COM7	DVB-T2 (QAM/256)

=== Analogue radio (FM VHF) ===
Frequency	kW	Service
106.9 MHz	0.44	Heart North and Mid Wales

=== Digital radio (DAB) ===
Frequency	Block	kW	Operator
213.360 MHz	10C	1.2†	Bauer Liverpool
215.072 MHz	10D	3kW	MuxCo Wrexham, Chester and Liverpool†
216.928 MHz	11A	10	Sound Digital
222.064 MHz	11D	9.5	Digital One
225.648 MHz	12B	10	BBC National DAB

On air date March 2013
† Relay of Winter Hill

== Reception area ==
In terms of land area and population, Moel-y-Parc delivers a receivable signal to a greater area, and a greater number of potential viewers, in North West England than in its intended coverage area of north-east Wales. Transmissions can be received using standard aerials in most of Merseyside, parts of Greater Manchester, parts of Lancashire as far north as Blackpool, and Wales-facing coastal areas of Cumbria and the Isle of Man. In the past, some English viewers have erected a second aerial for Moel-y-Parc in order to receive a slightly increased choice of viewing, although this practice has declined with the introduction of satellite television and the reduction in schedule variations between different ITV regions. Liverpool is located directly between the Winter Hill transmitter and Moel-y-Parc. Many homes across Merseyside county obtain an adequate signal through their TV aerial from Moel-y-Parc, even though the aerial is pointing at Winter Hill. With the advent of digital television, this has resulted in television tuners detecting the multiplexes broadcast from Moel-y-Parc on the lower frequencies before those on the higher frequencies from Winter Hill during the scanning/retune operation, and without viewer intervention where software allows region selection or by manual re-ordering, placing the Welsh variants on the allocated Freeview EPG logical channel number entries.

The Welsh variations of services (BBC One Wales, BBC Two Wales, ITV Wales) transmitted from Moel-y-Parc contend with the North West variations of services (BBC One North West, BBC Two, ITV Granada) transmitted from Winter Hill, which can also be received in the Wrexham area and along the North Wales coast.

Until 28 January 1963 and the start of transmissions of Teledu Cymru/WWN (Wales West and North Television) on VHF channel 11 from Moel-y-Parc, the only official ITV providers for North East Wales were Granada Television (in Manchester) during the week and ABC Television at the weekend, both transmitted on VHF channel 9 from Winter Hill. Pressure for a distinctly Welsh TV station was one of the driving forces behind the construction of the Moel-y-Parc mast, along with the need to deliver television to the more mountainous interior of Wales, which was out of range of English transmitters.

As late as the 1980s, Granada Television continued to claim parts of North Wales as within its editorial coverage area, in competition with HTV Cymru Wales, who had been awarded the franchise for the whole of Wales since 1968. However, after a series of mergers in the 1990s following deregulation of commercial television, Granada and HTV Cymru Wales were subsumed into ITV plc, and thus there is no longer commercial competition between the two services. ITV Granada no longer provides any regional news, weather or local interest programmes related to North Wales. Whereas in times past the official ITV Regions map distinctly showed areas of North Wales as being part of the ITV Granada region, the only known publicly accessible official ITV map showing the borders of the ITV regions, the ITV Regional Advertising map, shows the boundary between ITV Granada and ITV Wales as lying on the national boundary line between England and Wales.

For many homes across North East and Mid Wales, it is also possible to receive the ITV Central (West) service from The Wrekin Transmitter. Unlike what was once the case for ITV Granada, these areas were never included in ITV Central's editorial coverage area for regional news, weather, or local interest programmes.

== Reception difficulties ==
The Moel-y-Parc transmitter service area has always suffered from out of area reception from a number of adjacent transmitters or relays with overlapping coverage, or intermittent extended coverage due to atmospheric conditions, namely the transmissions from Llanddona, Storeton, Fenton, Sutton Coldfield and The Wrekin B.

During the time of analogue television, parts of Greater Manchester were subject at times to co-channel interference from Moel-y-Parc because the Saddleworth relay of Winter Hill transmitted on the same frequencies, UHF channels 42, 45, 49 and 52, although mitigated by transmissions from Moel-y-Parc being horizontally polarized and those from Saddleworth being vertically polarized.

Parts of the North East Wales coast where reception of Moel-y-Parc is obscured by the Clwyd Hills were served by relays of Moel-y-Parc at Bagillt, Flint, and Holywell. Following analog to digital television switchover, these relays were closed, and the Welsh regional variants of multiplexes PSB1, PSB2, and PSB3 are now broadcast to this area from Storeton, with Storeton being line-fed these multiplexes by fibre optic cable.

There are nineteen other Moel-y-Parc relays broadcasting the Welsh regional variants of multiplexes PSB1, PSB2, and PSB3 received off-air from Moel-y-Parc.

== Digital switchover problems ==
By December 2009, more than 6,000 complaints concerning interference from the Moel-y-Parc television transmitter had been received following the changeover from analog to digital television in the Ofcom designated "Granada" (viz. North West England) region. Many residents in Wirral and west Cheshire found the Welsh variants of television services with regional content, namely BBC One Wales and BBC Two Wales from BBC Wales and ITV Wales on the Freeview logical channel numbers displayed at the start of the EPG listing, instead of BBC One North West, BBC Two, and ITV Granada. Digital UK, the organisation responsible for the switchover, responded by telling consumers to retune their systems manually. This problem arises because the multiplexes transmitted from Moel-y-Parc with the Welsh regional content are on lower frequencies than those of the multiplexes transmitted from Winter Hill with the North West regional content. Thus when the TV tuner scans the UHF spectrum searching each UHF channel for the presence of a signal for a DVB multiplex, it finds the Welsh variants first and without the software offering the viewer a choice of which regional variant to use, it uses the first transmitter group of multiplexes detected to populate the EPG Freeview LCN entries, and places any alternatives or duplicates on LCNs beginning at 700, regardless of the viewer's preferred regional content or signal quality.

== See also ==
- Wales West and North Television
- List of tallest buildings and structures in Great Britain
