= List of tallest structures in the United Kingdom =

This list contains all types of structures 150 metres (490 ft) in height or more, which is the accepted criterion for a building to qualify as a skyscraper in the United Kingdom.

Entries in italics denote approximate figures.

indicates a structure that has been demolished or dismantled or is otherwise no longer standing.

== Structures taller than 300 metres ==
Name	Pinnacle height	Image	Year	Primary use	Town	Construction type	Coordinates	Remarks
Skelton Mast	365 m (1,198 ft)		2001	communication	Skelton, Cumbria	guyed steel lattice mast	54°43′54.5″N 2°52′58.9″W	Insulated against ground.
Belmont Mast	351.65 m (1,153.7 ft)		1965	communication	Donington on Bain, Lincolnshire	guyed tubular steel mast	53°20′9.07″N 0°10′19.11″W	Originally 1,265 ft (386 m), modified height of 1,272 ft (388 m) was the tallest construction in the EU, and tallest tubular steel mast in the world.
New Caldbeck Mast	337.2 m (1,106 ft)		2008	communication	Caldbeck, Cumbria	guyed steel lattice mast	54°46′24″N 3°5′26″W	Replaced the original Caldbeck mast, which was dismantled in 2008.
Emley Moor Tower	330.5 m (1,084 ft)		1970	communication	Huddersfield, West Yorkshire	concrete tower	53°36′43.4″N 1°39′51.89″W	Tallest freestanding structure in UK. Original 137 m (449 ft) tower built in 1956, replaced 1964. Second 385 m (1,263 ft) guyed tubular mast was built 1964 to replace the tower, but collapsed in 1969 due to icing and strong winds.
Durris Mast	322.6 m (1,058 ft)		1961	communication	Durris, Aberdeenshire	guyed steel lattice mast	57°0′0″N 2°23′24″W	Tallest structure in Scotland.
Arfon Mast	317.4 m (1,041 ft)		1962	communication	Penygroes, Gwynedd	guyed steel lattice mast	53°1′11.77″N 4°16′24.61″W	Tallest structure in Wales.
Emley Moor Temporary Broadcasting Mast	317 m (1,040 ft)		2018	communication	Huddersfield, West Yorkshire	guyed lattice steel mast	53°36′39.87″N 1°39′56.28″W	Temporary mast, used for transmitting at Emley Moor during renovation of antenna system. In place from 2018 to 2023.
Winter Hill Mast	309.5 m (1,015 ft)		1965	communication	Bolton, Greater Manchester	guyed tubular steel mast	53°37′32.14″N 2°30′53.25″W	Original 137 m (449 ft) tower built in 1956, replaced in 1964. DTT mast raised height to 315.4 m (1,035 ft), but was removed after digital switchover.
Waltham Mast	315 m (1,033 ft)		1968	communication	Melton Mowbray, Leicestershire	guyed tubular steel mast	52°48′5.18″N 0°48′3.04″W	Original mast built in 1966, collapsed before completion later that year. Replaced by a new mast with the same height.
The Shard	309.6 m (1,016 ft)		2012	various	Southwark, London	skyscraper	51°30′16.2″N 0°05′11.4″W	Tallest building in Western Europe (Was the tallest building in the EU until Britain's departure on 31 January 2020).
Black Hill Mast	306.6 m (1,006 ft)		1961	communication	Salsburgh, North Lanarkshire	guyed steel lattice mast	55°51′42.53″N 3°52′20.85″W	Original 228 m (748 ft) mast built in 1957, replaced in 1961.
Bilsdale Mast	311.5 m (1,022 ft)		2023	communication	Bilsdale, North Yorkshire	guyed steel lattice mast	54°21′29″N 1°08′52″W	Original 314 m (1,030 ft) mast built in 1969, burnt down in 2021, replaced in 2023.
Strabane Mast	309.9 m (1,017 ft)		1963	communication	Strabane, County Tyrone	guyed steel lattice mast	54°47′58″N 7°23′19″W	Tallest structure in Ireland.
Mendlesham Mast	305.6 m (1,003 ft)		1959	communication	Mendlesham, Suffolk	guyed steel lattice mast	52°14′4.36″N 1°6′26.39″E	Tallest television mast in Europe at time of construction.
Lichfield Mast	305.2 m (1,001 ft)		1961	communication	Tamworth, Staffordshire	guyed steel lattice mast	52°38′11.83″N 1°45′32.37″W	Original 137 m (449 ft) tower built in 1956, replaced in 1961.
Mendip Mast	305.0 m (1,000.7 ft)		1967	communication	St Cuthbert Out, Somerset	guyed tubular steel mast	51°14′13.45″N 2°37′31.32″W	

== Structures 250 to 300 metres tall ==
Name	Pinnacle height	Image	Year	Primary Use	Town	Construction Type	Coordinates	Remarks
22 Bishopsgate	278 m (912 ft)		2019	office	City of London	Skyscraper	51.5145°N 0.0829°W	Tallest building in the City of London.
Crimond Royal Naval Wireless Telegraphy Station, Large Mast	274.3 m (900 ft)		1943	communication	Crimond, Aberdeenshire	guyed steel lattice mast	57°37′2.88″N 1°53′15.42″W	
Sutton Coldfield Mast	270.5 m (887 ft)		1983	communication	Birmingham, West Midlands	guyed steel lattice mast	52°36′2.17″N 1°50′1.94″W	Original mast built 1949, replaced 1983.
Wenvoe Mast	265 m (869 ft)		1985	communication	Vale of Glamorgan	guyed steel lattice mast	51°27′33.68″N 3°16′53.53″W	Original mast built in 1952, replaced in 1985. Extended by 23 m (75 ft) with new antenna system in 2008.
Drax Power Station	259 m (850 ft)		1969	chimney	Selby, North Yorkshire	concrete tower	53°44′13.77″N 0°59′56.5″W	Tallest chimney in UK.
Rugby VLF Mast	250 m (820 ft)		1925	communication	Rugby, Warwickshire	guyed steel lattice mast	52°22′26.89″N 1°11′17.35″W; 52°22′16.24″N 1°11′5.63″W; 52°22′3.25″N 1°11′7.76″W; 52°21′57.93″N 1°11′27.41″W; 52°22′5.69″N 1°11′44.59″W; 52°22′16.46″N 1°11′56.81″W; 52°21′44.9″N 1°11′29.75″W; 52°21′33.04″N 1°11′21.23″W; 52°21′25.34″N 1°11′4.1″W; 52°21′55.43″N 1°10′50.84″W; 52°21′43.51″N 1°10′42.34″W; 52°21′30.57″N 1°10′44.64″W	12 guyed masts insulated against ground, demolished in June 2004 and August 2007.

== Structures 200 to 250 metres tall ==
Name	Pinnacle height	Image	Year	Primary Use	Town	Construction Type	Coordinates	Remarks
Grain Power Station	244 m (801 ft)		1979	chimney	Isle of Grain, Kent	concrete tower	51°26′46.84″N 0°42′42.2″E	Demolished on 7 September 2016.
Mounteagle Mast	243.8 m (800 ft)		1961	communication	Fortrose, Ross-shire	guyed steel lattice mast	57°35′30″N 4°16′36″W	
Dover Mast	243.2 m (798 ft)		1960	communication	Dover, Kent	guyed steel lattice mast	51°6′42.11″N 1°14′50.83″E	
Landmark Pinnacle	239 m (784 ft)		2020	Residential	Isle of Dogs	skyscraper	51° 30′ 9.6″ N, 0° 1′ 31.5″ W	
Sandy Heath Mast	240.8 m (790 ft)		1965	communication	Sandy, Bedfordshire	guyed steel lattice mast	52°7′48.67″N 0°14′29.09″W	
Selkirk Mast	238.8 m (783 ft)		1961	communication	Selkirk, Scottish Borders	guyed steel lattice mast	55°33′21.08″N 2°47′35.61″W	
Caradon Hill Mast	237.7 m (780 ft)		1961	communication	Liskeard, Cornwall	guyed steel lattice mast	50°30′41″N 4°26′12.3″W	
Inverkip Power Station	236 m (774 ft)		1976	chimney	Wemyss Bay, Inverclyde	concrete tower	55°53′58.16″N 4°53′12.84″W	Former tallest free-standing structure in Scotland; demolished on 28 July 2013 with explosives.
Preseli Mast	235.4 m (772 ft)		1962	communication	Crymych, Pembrokeshire	guyed steel lattice mast	51°56′39.69″N 4°39′39.61″W	
One Canada Square	235.1 m (771 ft)		1991	office	Canary Wharf, London	skyscraper	51°30′18.33″N 0°1′10.41″W	Formerly the tallest building in the UK from 1991-2012 when it was surpassed by The Shard
Stockland Hill Mast	235.0 m (771.0 ft)		1961	communication	Honiton, Devon	guyed steel lattice mast	50°48′25.81″N 3°6′17.81″W	
Moel-y-Parc Mast	230 m (750 ft)		1963	communication	Caerwys, Flintshire	guyed steel lattice mast	53°13′15.8″N 3°18′51.86″W	
Heron Tower	230 m (750 ft)		2010	office	City of London	skyscraper	51°30′58.0″N 0°4′51.0″W	
Angus Mast	229.5 m (753 ft)		1965	communication	Angus	guyed steel lattice mast	56°33′18.3″N 2°59′9.47″W	
Rumster Forest Mast	229.2 m (752 ft)		1965	communication	Wick, Caithness	guyed steel lattice mast	58°19′40.98″N 3°22′17.05″W	
Ashkirk Mast	229.1 m (752 ft)		1963	communication	Selkirk, Scottish Borders	guyed steel lattice mast	55°30′38.52″N 2°50′26.39″W	
Chillerton Down Mast	228.9 m (751 ft)		1958	communication	Newport, Isle of Wight	guyed steel lattice mast	50°38′57.36″N 1°19′43.94″W	
Black Mountain Mast	228.6 m (750 ft)		1959	communication	Belfast, Northern Ireland	guyed steel lattice mast	54°35′13.39″N 6°1′19.48″W	
Burnhope Mast	228.6 m (750 ft)		1958	communication	Burnhope, County Durham	guyed steel lattice mast	54°49′18.8″N 1°42′53.3″W	
St. Hilary Mast	227.1 m (745 ft)		1957	communication	Cowbridge, Vale of Glamorgan	guyed steel lattice mast	51°27′26.8″N 3°24′10.6″W	
Anthorn Radio Station	227 m (745 ft)		1964	communication	Anthorn, Cumbria	guyed steel lattice mast	54°54′41.93″N 3°16′43.47″W ; 54°54′53.26″N 3°16′33.22″W ; 54°54′42.97″N 3°16′20.76″W ; 54°54′31.56″N 3°16′30.01″W ; 54°54′30.49″N 3°16′51.78″W ; 54°54′40.83″N 3°17′4.25″W ; 54°54′52.21″N 3°16′54.98″W ; 54°55′2.99″N 3°16′45.62″W ; 54°54′53.99″N 3°16′12.34″W ; 54°54′32.9″N 3°16′9.23″W ; 54°54′20.82″N 3°16′39.35″W ; 54°54′29.83″N 3°17′12.68″W ; 54°54′50.92″N 3°17′15.88″W	
Holme Moss Mast	225 m (738 ft)		1984	communication	Holmfirth, West Yorkshire	guyed steel lattice mast	53°31′59.88″N 1°51′29″W	Original 229 m (750 ft) mast built 1951, replaced.
Leadenhall Building	225 m (738 ft)		2014	office	City of London	skyscraper	51°30′49.68″N 0°4′55.56″W	
Crystal Palace Tower	219 m (719 ft)		1950	communication	Norwood, London	lattice tower	51°25′27.05″N 0°4′29.88″W	
Pembroke Power Station	217.3 m (713 ft)		1968	chimney	Pembroke, Pembrokeshire	concrete tower	51°41′8″N 4°59′21.17″W	Demolished on 25 November 2000.
Littlebrook "D" Power Station	215 m (705 ft)		1981	chimney	Dartford, Kent	concrete tower	51°28′0.8″N 0°14′31.03″E	Demolished with explosives on 15 December 2019.
Droitwich Mast 1	213.4 m (700 ft)		1934	communication	Droitwich, Worcestershire	guyed steel lattice mast	52°17′46.9″N 2°6′24.32″W	Consists of two masts of the same height. Broadcasts Radio 4 LW on 198 kHz.
Droitwich Mast 2	213.4 m (700 ft)		1934	communication	Droitwich, Worcestershire	guyed steel lattice mast	52°17′40.4″N 2°6′20.62″W	Consists of two masts of the same height. Broadcasts Radio 4 LW on 198 kHz.
Queensferry Crossing	207 m (679 ft)		2017	bridge	Lothian and Fife	cable-stayed bridge concrete towers	56.0046°N 3.4124°W	
Tacolneston Mast (replacement)	206.1 m (676 ft)		2009	communication	Tacolneston, Norfolk	guyed steel lattice mast	52°31′4″N 1°8′20″E	Built to replace the 165 m (541 ft) mast, ready for Digital Switchover in 2011. Mast construction started in September 2009, and took five weeks to build.
Ironbridge "B" Power Station	205 m (673 ft)		1969	chimney	Telford, Shropshire	concrete tower	52°37′47.6″N 2°30′48″W	Also known as Buildwas Power Station. Demolished on 3 September 2021.
European Offshore Wind Deployment Centre	204 m (669 ft)		2018	wind farm	Aberdeenshire (3 km offshore)	11 x MHI Vestas Offshore V164-8.8 MW turbines	57°13′N 1°59′W	
8 Bishopsgate	203.7 m (668 ft)		2023	office	City of London	skyscraper	51°30′50″N 0°05′00″W	Approved in 2017. Construction commenced in March 2019. Topped out in September 2022.
Deansgate Square South Tower	201 m (659 ft)		2018	residential	Manchester, Greater Manchester	skyscraper	53°28′18.8″N 2°15′5.72″W	Tallest building in the UK outside of London.
Fiddlers Ferry Power Station	200 m (660 ft)		1971	chimney	Cuerdley, Cheshire	concrete tower	53°22′22.2″N 2°41′8.85″W	
West Burton "A" Power Station	200 m (660 ft)		1966	chimney	West Burton, Nottinghamshire	concrete tower	53°21′44.42″N 0°48′47.09″W ; 53°21′46.83″N 0°48′38.83″W	Twin chimneys. Original chimneys were demolished and replaced in 2003.
Eggborough Power Station	200 m (660 ft)		1966	chimney	Eggborough, North Yorkshire	concrete tower	53°42′42.4″N 1°7′30.85″W	Demolished on 24 July 2022.

== Structures 150 to 200 metres tall ==
Name	Pinnacle height	Image	Year	Primary Use	Town	Construction Type	Coordinates	Remarks
Citigroup Centre	199.5 m (655 ft)		2001	office	Canary Wharf, London	skyscraper	51°30′14.26″N 0°1′4.37″W	
HSBC Tower	199.5 m (655 ft)		2002	office	Canary Wharf, London	skyscraper	51°30′19.5″N 0°1′2.72″W	
Didcot Power Station	199.5 m (655 ft)		1968	chimney	Didcot, Oxfordshire	concrete tower	51°37′20.17″N 1°15′39.02″W	Demolished on 9 February 2020. OCGT and B chimneys still stands
Ratcliffe-on-Soar Power Station	199 m (653 ft)		1967	chimney	Kegworth, Nottinghamshire	concrete tower	52°52′1.11″N 1°15′23.93″W	
Cottam Power Station	198 m (650 ft)		1968	chimney	Retford, Nottinghamshire	concrete tower	53°18′17.2″N 0°46′53.96″W	Demolished on 20 March 2025.
Kilroot power station	198 m (650 ft)		1981	chimney	Carrickfergus, Northern Ireland	concrete tower	54°43′28.25″N 5°46′2.15″W	
Fawley Power Station	198 m (650 ft)		1969	chimney	Fawley, Hampshire	concrete tower	50°49′3.66″N 1°19′45.14″W	Demolished on 31 October 2021.
Ferrybridge "C" Power Station	198 m (650 ft)		1966	chimney	Ferrybridge, West Yorkshire	concrete tower	53°42′57.07″N 1°16′47.78″W ; 53°42′55.45″N 1°16′52.34″W	Twin chimneys. Demolished on 22 August 2021.
Kingsnorth Power Station	198 m (650 ft)		1970	chimney	Rochester, Kent	concrete tower	51°25′6.25″N 0°36′13.79″E	Demolished on 22 March 2018.
North Hessary Tor Mast	196.0 m (643.0 ft)		1955	communication	Princetown, Devon	guyed steel lattice mast	50°33′0.84″N 4°0′29.9″W	
Samsung Heavy Industries 7 MW wind turbine prototype	196 m (643 ft)		2014	wind turbine	Methil, Fife	tower	56°10′26″N 3°1′9″W	
400 kV Thames Crossing	190 m (620 ft)			electricity pylon	River Thames, Botany Marshes, Swanscombe	lattice tower	51°28′3.73″N 0°17′15.86″E ; 51°27′43.77″N 0°18′19.33″E	Consists of two equal height pylons, one on either bank of the River Thames.
BT Tower	188.4 m (618 ft)		1964	communication	Fitzrovia, London	concrete tower	51°31′17.4″N 0°8′20.04″W	Formerly known as the Post Office Tower and had a revolving restaurant at the top.
Rowridge transmitting station, new mast	187 m (614 ft)		2009	communication	Rowridge, Isle of Wight	guyed steel lattice mast		
Crimond Royal Naval Wireless Telegraphy Station, Mast Southwest	183.2 m (601 ft)		?	communication	Crimond, Aberdeenshire	guyed steel lattice mast	57°36′44.24″N 1°53′36.62″W	
Kirk o' Shotts Mast	183 m (600 ft)		1952	communication	Salsburgh, North Lanarkshire	guyed steel lattice mast	55°51′9.92″N 3°49′33.81″W	Original height 228.6 metres (750 ft).
Masts of RNAS Inskip	183 m (600 ft)		?	communication	Inskip, Lancashire	guyed steel lattice mast	53°49′46.51″N 2°49′48.65″W ; 53°49′48.26″N 2°50′3.37″W ; 53°49′54.06″N 2°50′14.65″W ; 53°49′45.37″N 2°50′17.54″W	
Stirling Transmitting Station	183 m (600 ft)			communication	Stirling	guyed mast	56°04′17.65″N 4°03′37.41″W	Used for DECTRA-Navigation.
Kidsdale Transmitting Station	183 m (600 ft)			communication	Whithorn, Dumfries and Galloway	guyed mast	54°42′1.66″N 4°25′22.13″W	Used for DECTRA-Navigation, demolished
Tower 42	183 m (600 ft)		1980	office	City of London	skyscraper	51°30′54.89″N 0°5′1.79″W	Previously known as "The Nat West Tower".
Rugeley "B" Power Station	183 m (600 ft)		1970	chimney	Rugeley, Staffordshire	concrete tower	52°45′29.79″N 1°55′8.51″W	Original chimney was replaced in 2009. Replacement chimney was later demolished on 24 January 2021.
Longannet Power Station	183 m (600 ft)		1969	chimney	Longannet, Fife	concrete tower	56°02′54.86″N 3°40′57.24″W	Demolished on 9 December 2021.
Crimond Royal Naval Wireless Telegraphy Station, Mast Southeast	182.88 m (600.0 ft)		?	communication	Crimond, Aberdeenshire	guyed steel lattice mast	57°36′23.28″N 1°52′49.48″W	
30 St Mary Axe	179.8 m (590 ft)		2004	office	City of London	skyscraper	51°30′51.9″N 0°4′49.21″W	Also known as "The Gherkin" and "Swiss Re Centre".
Wrotham Mast	176.6 m (579 ft)		1981	communication	Wrotham, Kent	guyed steel lattice mast	51°19′14.52″N 0°17′15.87″E	Carried first broadcasts of VHF FM radio in the UK. Replaced equal height mast on same site built in 1951.
Redruth Mast	173 m (568 ft)		1962	communication	Redruth, Cornwall	guyed steel lattice mast	50°12′35.4″N 5°14′18.33″W	
Rowridge Mast	172 m (564 ft)		2010	communication	Newport, Isle of Wight	guyed steel lattice mast	50°40′35″N 1°22′7″W	Replacement to original 149.6 metres (491 ft) mast.
Peterhead Power Station	170.6 m (560 ft)		1980	chimney	Peterhead, Aberdeenshire	concrete tower	57°28′39.77″N 1°47′24.81″W	
Spinnaker Tower	170 m (560 ft)		2005	observation	Portsmouth, Hampshire	concrete tower	50°47′44.22″N 1°6′30.86″W	Tallest structure in UK open to public outside London (though not to its pinnacle).
Blyth B Power Station	170 m (560 ft)		1962	chimneys	Blyth, Northumberland	concrete tower	55°8′33″N 1°31′39″W	Twin chimneys, demolished on 7 December 2003.
Oxford Mast	169.0 m (554.5 ft)		1968	communication	Oxford, Oxfordshire	guyed steel lattice mast	51°47′26.28″N 1°10′44.85″W	
Beetham Tower	168.9 m (554 ft)		2006	residential	Manchester, Greater Manchester	skyscraper	53°28′31.63″N 2°15′0.79″W	Until 2018 the tallest building in the UK outside of London. Also known as "Hilton Tower".
Tilbury "B" Power Station	168 m (551 ft)		1968	chimney	Tilbury, Essex	concrete tower		Twin chimneys, demolished on 28 September 2017.
Divis Mast B	165.8 m (544 ft)		2011	communication	Hannahstown, County Antrim	guyed steel lattice mast	54°36′28.22″N 6°00′28.41″W	
Broadgate Tower	165.0 m (541.3 ft)		2008	office	City of London	skyscraper	51°31′15.84″N 0°4′46.32″W	
Tacolneston Mast	165.0 m (541.3 ft)		1956	communication	Norwich, Norfolk	guyed steel lattice mast	52°31′3.89″N 1°8′19.38″E	Replaced by 206.1 m (676 ft) mast in 2011.
Ridge Hill Mast	164.6 m (540 ft)		1968	communication	Ledbury, Herefordshire	guyed steel lattice mast	51°59′50.89″N 2°32′23.51″W	
Huntshaw Cross Mast	163.7 m (537 ft)			communication	Great Torrington, Devon	guyed steel lattice mast	50°58′45.48″N 4°5′55.49″W	
Sudbury "A" Mast	163 m (535 ft)			communication	Sudbury, Suffolk	guyed steel lattice mast	52°0′15.54″N 0°47′9.08″E	
Brighton i360	162 m (531 ft)		2016	observation	Brighton, East Sussex	steel tower		
Eitshal Mast	161.3 m (529 ft)		1976	communication	Stornoway, Isle of Lewis	guyed steel lattice mast	58°10′45.11″N 6°35′6.52″W	
Chatton Mast	161.0 m (528.2 ft)			communication	Alnwick, Northumberland	guyed steel lattice mast	55°31′54.98″N 1°50′3.01″W	
Blackpool Tower	158 m (518 ft)		1894	observation	Blackpool, Lancashire	lattice tower	53°48′57.09″N 3°3′18.44″W	
Deansgate Square East Tower	158 m (518 ft)		2019	residential	Manchester, Greater Manchester	skyscraper		
Moorside Edge; Mast 1	158 m (518 ft)		1982	communication	Huddersfield, West Yorkshire	guyed steel lattice mast	53°38′9.15″N 1°53′41.67″W	Consists of two masts of the same height.
Moorside Edge; Mast 2	158 m (518 ft)		1982	communication	Huddersfield, West Yorkshire	guyed steel lattice mast	53°38′5.39″N 1°53′38.1″W	Consists of two masts of the same height.
Forth Road Bridge	156 m (512 ft)		1964	bridge	Firth of Forth, East Scotland	steel tower	56°0′21.74″N 3°24′14.33″W ; 55°59′48.91″N 3°24′15.67″W	
One Churchill Place	156 m (512 ft)		2004	office	Canary Wharf, London	skyscraper	51°30′18.47″N 0°0′51.62″W	
Humber Bridge	155.5 m (510 ft)		1981	bridge	River Humber, Yorkshire/Lincolnshire	concrete towers	53°42′51.49″N 0°27′2.19″W ; 53°42′5.98″N 0°26′58.42″W	
Haverfordwest Mast	154.4 m (507 ft)			communication	Haverfordwest, Pembrokeshire	guyed steel lattice mast	51°53′57.11″N 4°51′59.13″W	
Manningtree Mast	154.4 m (507 ft)			communication	Manningtree, Essex	guyed steel lattice mast	51°55′26.1″N 1°5′9.74″E	
Burghead Medium Wave Mast	154.2 m (506 ft)		1936	communication	Burghead, Moray	guyed steel lattice mast	57°41′53.04″N 3°28′11.19″W	Insulated against ground.
Elizabeth Tower	154 m (505 ft)		2022	residential	Manchester, Greater Manchester	skyscraper		
Peterborough Mast	153.9 m (505 ft)		2006	communication	Morborne, Cambridgeshire	guyed steel lattice mast	52°30′27.59″N 0°20′35.48″W	Original mast was built in 1959 but was destroyed by fire in 2004.
275 kV Forth Crossing, Tower South	153.9 m (505 ft)			electricity pylon	Airth, Falkirk	lattice tower	56°04′4.42″N 3°44′52.65″W	
Burghead Long Wave Mast	153.6 m (504 ft)		1936	communication	Burghead, Moray	guyed steel lattice mast	57°41′57.9″N 3°28′4.78″W	Insulated against ground.
25 Bank Street	153 m (502 ft)		2003	office	Canary Wharf, London	skyscraper	51°30′11.55″N 0°1′15.42″W	
40 Bank Street	153 m (502 ft)		2003	office	Canary Wharf, London	skyscraper	51°30′9.44″N 0°1′10.58″W	
Sandale Mast	153 m (502 ft)		1957	communication	Wigton, Cumbria	guyed steel lattice mast	54°44′56.94″N 3°8′26.64″W	
Croydon Tower	152.6 m (501 ft)		1962	communication	Norwood, London	lattice tower	51°24′35.4″N 0°5′8.58″W	Original 61 m (200 ft) tower built in 1955, replaced in 1962.
Darvel Mast	152.4 m (500 ft)			communication	Darvel, East Ayrshire	guyed steel lattice mast	55°34′45.97″N 4°17′23.19″W	
Forfar Mast	152.4 m (500 ft)			communication	Forfar, Angus	guyed steel lattice mast	56°33′26.24″N 2°50′36.66″W	
Membury Mast	152.4 m (500 ft)		1965	communication	Hungerford, Berkshire	guyed steel lattice mast	51°29′5.64″N 1°33′31.85″W	
Aberthaw Power Station	152 m (499 ft)		1971	chimney	Gileston, Vale of Glamorgan	concrete tower	51°23′34.32″N 3°24′16.64″W	Demolished on 12 June 2026.
Washford Masts	152 m (499 ft)		1933	communication	Washford, Somerset	guyed steel lattice mast	51°09′40.22″N 3°20′56.64″W ; 51°09′41.78″N 3°20′48.85″W	
BT Tower (Birmingham)	152 m (499 ft)		1965	communication	Birmingham, West Midlands	concrete tower	52°29′0.68″N 1°54′15.4″W	
Cockenzie Power Station	152 m (499 ft)		1966	chimney	Cockenzie, East Lothian	concrete tower	55°58′4.86″N 2°58′22.89″W ; 55°58′7.4″N 2°58′18.84″W	Twin chimneys, demolished on 26 September 2015.
Westerglen Mast	152 m (499 ft)		1980	communication	Falkirk, Stirlingshire	guyed steel lattice mast	55°58′33″N 3°48′58.8″W	
Carmel Mast	151.9 m (498 ft)			communication	Cross Hands, Carmarthenshire	guyed steel lattice mast	51°49′6.65″N 4°4′2.73″W	
Hannington Mast	151.9 m (498 ft)		1969	communication	Hannington, Hampshire	guyed steel lattice mast	51°18′28.73″N 1°14′40.99″W	
10 Upper Bank Street	151 m (495 ft)		2003	office	Canary Wharf, London	skyscraper	51°30′10.64″N 0°1′0.43″W	
Blaenplwyf Mast	150.5 m (494 ft)		1956	communication	Aberystwyth, Ceredigion	guyed steel lattice mast	52°21′38.46″N 4°6′9″W	
Lawrence Weston Wind Turbine	150 m (490 ft)		2023	wind turbine	Avonmouth, Bristol	steel tower	51°32′16.54″N 2°40′26.38″W	It is currently the tallest onshore wind turbine in England.

== Timeline of tallest structures ==
Name	Image	Location	Years as tallest	Height
Blackpool Tower		Blackpool, Lancashire	1894 - 1898 (3 years)	158 m (518 ft)
New Brighton Tower		New Brighton, Merseyside	1898 - 1921 (23 years)	173 m (567 ft)
Blackpool Tower		Blackpool, Lancashire	1921 - 1925 (4 years)	158 m (518 ft)
Rugby Radio Station, Large Masts		Rugby, Warwickshire	1925 - 1943 (18 years)	250 m (820 ft)
Crimond Royal Naval Wireless Telegraphy Station, Large Mast		Crimond, Aberdeenshire	1943 - 1959 (16 years)	274.3 m (900 ft)
Mendlesham Mast		Mendlesham, Suffolk	1959 - 1961 (2 years)	305.6 m (1,003 ft)
Durris Mast		Stonehaven, Aberdeenshire	1961 - 1964 (3 years)	322.6 m (1,058 ft)
Emley Moor 1964 Mast		Huddersfield, West Yorkshire	1964 - 1965 (1 year)	385.5 m (1,265 ft)
Belmont Mast		Donington on Bain, Lincolnshire	1965 - 2010 (45 years)	387.7 m (1,272 ft)
Skelton Mast		Skelton, Cumbria	2010 - Present	365 m (1,198 ft)

== Other notable tall structures ==
A separate list also exists for the tallest of each architectural example or class.

- Salisbury Cathedral at 123 m (404 ft) – tallest church spire in the United Kingdom
- Joseph Chamberlain Memorial Clock Tower, Birmingham at 100 m (330 ft) – tallest free-standing clock tower in the world
- Monument to the Great Fire of London, London at 61.57 m (202.0 ft) – tallest isolated stone column in the world
- ArcelorMittal Orbit, Olympic Park, London at 115 m (377 ft) – tallest free standing public work of art in the United Kingdom
- Hyperia, Thorpe Park at 72 m (236 ft) - tallest rollercoaster in the United Kingdom
