= Radio Scarborough =

Community radio station in Scarborough, England

Coordinates: 54.28575°N 0.40333°W

- Scarborough; England
- Broadcast area: Scarborough and surrounding area
- Frequency: 107.6 FM

Programming
- Format: Community radio

Ownership
- Owner: Radio Scarborough Limited

History
- First air date: 23 September 2021

Technical information
- ERP: 0.025 kW

Links
- Website: radioscarborough.com

Radio Scarborough is a community radio station serving Scarborough and the surrounding area in North Yorkshire, England. It broadcasts on 107.6 FM and online.

The station is operated by Radio Scarborough Limited, a company limited by guarantee which was incorporated on 13 December 2012.

== History ==
Radio Scarborough began as an internet-based community radio project. Radio Scarborough Limited was incorporated in December 2012.

The station began broadcasting online in 2013. In October of that year it received an £8,980 grant from the Big Lottery Fund through the Awards for All programme to support its running costs.

Radio Scarborough applied for a community radio FM licence during this period, but its initial application was unsuccessful.

The station continued broadcasting online and subsequently made a further application to Ofcom. In March 2020, Ofcom awarded Radio Scarborough a community radio licence to serve the town of Scarborough.

In making the award, Ofcom noted that the station had experience of internet broadcasting and had developed relationships with local organisations and charities. The proposed service was described as offering a mixture of music and speech programming aimed at the Scarborough community.

Radio Scarborough subsequently began broadcasting on 107.6 FM, alongside its existing online service.

== Programming and organisation ==
Radio Scarborough operates as a not-for-profit community station and is staffed by volunteers.

Its output includes music, speech programming, local information and programmes produced by local presenters. The station describes its musical output as covering a wide range of genres rather than concentrating solely on current chart music.

The station also provides opportunities for members of the local community to become involved in broadcasting and radio production.

Radio Scarborough's studios are based at the YMCA on St Thomas Street in Scarborough. The station states that its FM transmitter is located at Oliver's Mount.

Its FM service is intended principally for Scarborough, with reception also reported by the station in surrounding areas including Filey, Hunmanby and Robin Hood's Bay.

== Regulation ==
Radio Scarborough's community radio licence is issued and regulated by Ofcom.

In February 2023, Ofcom found the station in breach of its licence conditions after reviewing its output from 22 to 28 August 2022. Ofcom concluded that Radio Scarborough had failed to meet requirements to provide 84 hours of original output each week and locally produced programming at all times.

Radio Scarborough subsequently applied to Ofcom to amend its Key Commitments, with a request submitted in August 2023.

Ofcom later granted the station a five-year licence renewal, extending its community radio licence until 21 September 2031.

== See also ==
- Coast & County Radio
- This is The Coast
