= Oliver's Mount =

Hill in North Yorkshire, England

- Oliver's Mount Track Layout
- Location: North Yorkshire, England
- Coordinates: 54.263°N 0.405°W
- Opened: 1946
- Major events: Formula III

Oliver's Mount
- Length: 2.41 mi (3.88 km)
- Race lap record: 2:18.6 (Cliff Allison, Cooper-Norton, 1955, Formula III)

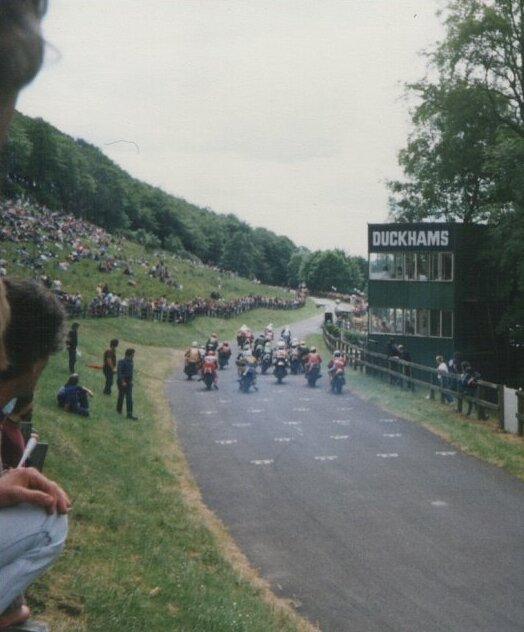
Startline scene in 1986

Oliver's Mount is an area of high ground overlooking Scarborough, North Yorkshire, England. It offers views over the town, a tribute monument to the war dead, camping and caravanning at selected times of the year, 10 football pitches, 1 rugby league pitch, in the past a small school, and a cafe, but may be primarily known for its motorcycle races. Oliver's Mount first held a motorcycle race in 1946, and continues to hold motorcycle circuit racing today, and also holds car rally and car hill-climb events. Cars have raced here twice, in 1955 and 1956.

In 2016 Oliver's Mount was the summit for the final classified climb on the third stage of the Tour de Yorkshire cycle race.

The site also houses the broadcasting transmitter which provides TV and radio services to Scarborough and the surrounding areas.

Oliver's Mount is named after Oliver Cromwell, as it was thought that he had sited guns there, although there is no evidence that Cromwell visited Scarborough during the Civil War. This name was in use by 1804; previously the hill was known as Weaponness, which now refers to the area of the town around Oliver's Mount and Filey Road, and one of the wards of the borough.

== Races ==
The Oliver's Mount track is a street circuit composed of twisty public roads and has played host to domestic motorcycling and rallying events for many years. Spectators for race events are known to have reached 58,000. Oliver's Mount racing circuit is the only street circuit in England. Throughout the year it hosts four weekends of motorcycle road racing and numerous hill climb and GB SuperMoto events. With the Bob Smith Spring Road Races, Barry Sheene Classic Road Races, Cock o' the North Road Races and The Gold Cup drawing riders and spectators from all over the British Isles. The races are organised by the 243 Road Racing Association which attracts big name riders from the road racing scene. The circuit itself is 2.43 miles (3.91 km) in length around Oliver's Mount. It is known as a technical and twisty track that requires a great deal of skill and bravery to tackle, with speeds of upto 170mph.

Oliver's Mount continues to hold motorcycle, British SuperMoto and Hill Climb events. Two Formula III events were held in 1955 and 1956.

In 2018, Oliver's Mount racing was cancelled due to safety concerns. As a result no racing took place. Following this, the ownership of the event changed from the Auto 66 Club and the council granted a lease to a group led by former racers and businessmen Mick Grant & Eddie Roberts, under the name GrantRoberts Ltd. In April 2019 GrantRoberts Ltd was renamed Oliver’s Mount Racing Ltd. With support from Scarborough Borough Council, the venue hosted two events in 2019. These were the Barry Sheene Classic on 27 and 28 July and the Gold Cup from 27 to 29 September.Nowadays its run by Husband and wife team Andy Hayes and Wendy Hayes along with a group of experienced officials and is now going from strength to strength now its back upto a full calendar of events.

=== British Formula III ===
Year	Date	Event	Winning driver	Winning constructor	Report
1955	July	Formula III	(United Kingdom) Cliff Allison	Cooper-Norton	Report
1956	July	Formula III	(United Kingdom) Tom Dickson	Cooper-Norton	Report

=== British Superbike Championship ===
Year	Race	Manufacturer
1987	1987 ACU Shell Oils Superbike Championship Rd.7	1100cc Suzuki
1988	1988 ACU Shell Oils TT F1 British Championship Rd.8	750cc Suzuki

== Transmitting station ==
Oliver's Mount
- Location within North Yorkshire
- Mast height: 41 metres (135 ft)
- Coordinates: 54°16′03″N 0°24′16″W
- BBC region: BBC Yorkshire
- ITV region: ITV Yorkshire
- Local TV service: That's North Yorkshire

Oliver's Mount broadcasts television and radio services to Scarborough and Filey with signals that can be received as far as Malton.

=== Analogue radio ===
Frequency	kW	Service
89.9 MHz	0.125	BBC Radio 2
92.1 MHz	0.125	BBC Radio 3
94.3 MHz	0.125	BBC Radio 4
95.5 MHz	0.125	BBC Radio York
96.2 MHz	0.5	Greatest Hits Radio Yorkshire
97.4 MHz	0.050	Coast & County Radio
99.5 MHz	0.125	BBC Radio 1
107.6 MHz	0.025	Radio Scarborough

=== Digital radio ===
Frequency	Block	kW	Operator
213.360 MHz	10C	2	MuxCo North Yorkshire
222.064 MHz	11D	2	Digital One
225.648 MHz	12B	2	BBC National DAB

=== Digital television ===
Frequency	UHF	kW	Operator	System
538.000 MHz	29	2	BBC A	DVB-T
554.000 MHz	31	2	Digital 3&4	DVB-T
562.000 MHz	32	1	SDN	DVB-T
578.000 MHz	34	1	Arqiva A	DVB-T
586.000 MHz	35	1	Arqiva B	DVB-T
602.000 MHz	37	2	BBC B	DVB-T2
618.000 MHz	39	0.6	Local TV	DVB-T

==== Before switchover ====
Frequency	UHF	kW	Operator
698.000 MHz	49	0.1	BBC (Mux 1)
738.166 MHz	54+	0.1	SDN (Mux A)
770.166 MHz	58+	0.1	BBC (Mux B)
794.166 MHz	61+	0.1	Arqiva (Mux C)
818.166 MHz	64+	0.1	Arqiva (Mux D)
842.166 MHz	67+	0.1	Digital 3&4 (Mux 2)

=== Analogue television ===
Analogue television ceased from Oliver's Mount during August 2011. BBC Two was closed on UHF 63 on the 3 August 2011 and BBC One was temporarily moved into its frequency (63) at the time to allow BBC A to launch in BBC One's old frequency. The remaining analogue services ceased on 17 August 2011.

Frequency	UHF	kW	Service
727.25 MHz	53	1	Channel 4
783.25 MHz	60	1	Yorkshire
759.25 MHz	57	1	BBC1
807.25 MHz	63	1	BBC2
831.25 MHz	66	1	Channel 5

=== Bibliography ===
- Peter Swinger (2001). Motor Racing Circuits In England Then And Now. ISBN 0-7110-3104-5.
