= Buckna =

Village in County Antrim, Northern Ireland

Coordinates: 54.899°N 6.116°W

Buckna: Irish: Bochnach
- Location within Northern Ireland
- Population: ? (2001 Census)
- District: Mid and East Antrim
- County: County Antrim
- Country: Northern Ireland
- Sovereign state: United Kingdom
- Post town: BALLYMENA
- Postcode district: BT42
- Dialling code: 028
- UK Parliament: North Antrim
- NI Assembly: North Antrim

Buckna (from Irish Bochnach 'hilly') is a small village four miles east of Broughshane in County Antrim, Northern Ireland. It is part of Mid and East Antrim District Council and is close to Slemish mountain.
