= Skelton Transmitting Station =

Transmitter in Cumbria, tallest in the UK

Skelton
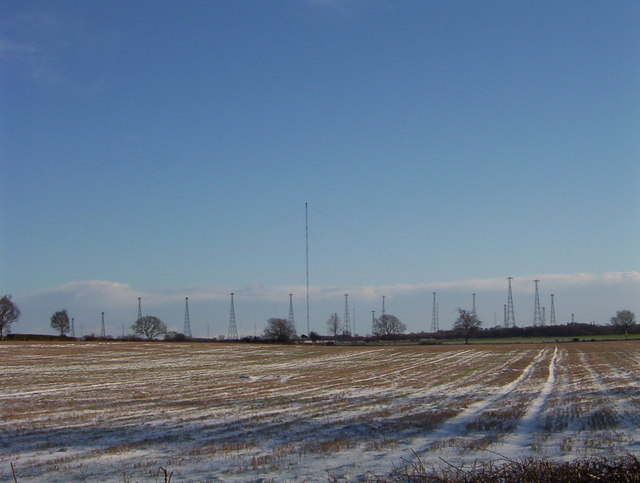

- Location in Eden, Cumbria Location in Cumbria, England
- Location: Skelton, Cumbria, England
- Mast height: 365 metres (1,198 ft)
- Coordinates: 54°43′56″N 2°53′01″W
- Built: 2001 (current)

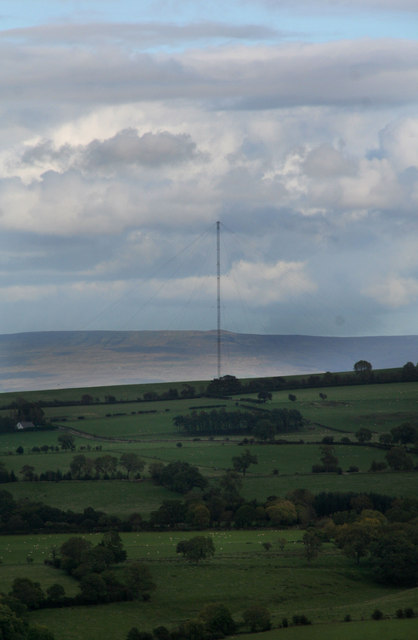
The lattice mast

The Skelton Transmitting Station is a radio transmitter site at grid reference NY433376 near Skelton, Cumbria, England, about 5 miles (8 km) north-west of Penrith. It is operated by Babcock International and owned by the Ministry of Defence. Shortwave broadcasts from the station ended on 30 March 2023, with services transferred to Woofferton. At 365 metres (1,198 ft), Skelton's lattice mast is the tallest structure in the United Kingdom.

== History ==
=== Construction ===
The site was built by J. L. Eve Construction during the Second World War, for long-distance short-wave transmissions, across Europe.

=== Transmissions ===
In 1946 the BBC described the site as "the World's largest and most powerful (shortwave) radio station".

Its primary function was shortwave broadcasting. The station was capable of Digital Radio Mondiale (DRM) transmission on at least 3955 kHz and 3975 kHz (75m broadcast band), beamed at 121° towards Germany and Central Europe. Known AM frequencies included 5995 kHz and 6195 kHz (49-metre band), 9410 kHz (31-metre band), and 12095 kHz (25-metre band).

A Royal Navy very low frequency (VLF) transmitter is also located on the site. It is used to transmit encrypted orders to submarines, including the Trident SLBM fleet. Its aerial is a 365-metre (1,198 ft) guyed steel lattice mast, insulated from the ground and the tallest structure in the United Kingdom. The transmitter entered service in 2001.

== See also ==
- List of masts
- List of tallest buildings and structures in Great Britain
- List of radio stations in the United Kingdom
- List of VLF-transmitters
