= Ridge Hill transmitting station =

Info of the Ridge Hill transmitter

Ridge Hill
- Location within Herefordshire
- Mast height: 164.6 metres (540 ft)
- Coordinates: 51.9975°N 2.54°W
- Built: July 1968
- BBC region: BBC West Midlands
- ITV region: ITV Central

The Ridge Hill transmitting station is a broadcasting and telecommunications facility located 8.5 miles SE of Hereford in Herefordshire, and close to the border of Gloucestershire. The station transmits the full complement of digital terrestrial multiplexes and an additional ITV West Multiplex. It includes a cable stayed steel lattice mast which has a height of 164.6 metres (540 ft), which in addition to the altitude of the site gives an aerial height of 363 metres (1,191 ft) above mean sea level.

== History ==
Three new television masts for the Midlands were announced in August 1967, including Waltham. Ridge Hill would be near Ledbury. It was due to open March 1968, later moved to open in June 1968, and finally opened on 30 July 1968.

BBC went colour from 11 September 1972, the 34th mast to go colour. ITV went colour from 26 February 1973.

== Transmission ==
Ridge Hill supplies its signal to 17 relays which allow coverage into "fringe" areas not able to receive a good signal from the main transmitter.

All 5 analogue programme channels were broadcast plus the full 6 digital MUXES although the multiplexes were scattered across the band requiring a wideband aerial for most consumers. Digital switchover was completed on 20 April 2011 where the main 6 multiplexes are now located in the Group A antenna band. Since March 2018 MUXES 7 and 8 have been moved up to channels 55 and 56 respectively which are outside the A group, though these are due to be switched off between 2020 and 2022

In addition to its television output Ridge Hill transmits various radio stations including BBC Hereford and Worcester.

The station covers the south west Midlands, including Herefordshire, and parts of Worcestershire. It also covers parts of the South West, specifically northern Gloucestershire. It does not, however, transmit BBC local programmes for Gloucestershire. These are covered by the Mendip transmitter which can be seen from the south and west of Gloucester city, and a very much smaller part of Cheltenham.

From 4 December 2006 Ridge Hill broadcast ITV1 West on UHF channel 30 (rebroadcasting the signal from Mendip) in addition to the existing ITV1 Central service on channel 25. This is known as "Ridge Hill West". This followed the restructuring of ITV Regional News and the abolition of the Central South region. As a result, the existing ITV1 Central service now carries news from the West Midlands region.

== Services listed by frequency ==
=== Analogue (FM) ===
Frequency	kW	Service
88.6 MHz	10	BBC Radio 2
90.8 MHz	10	BBC Radio 3
93.0 MHz	10	BBC Radio 4
94.7 MHz	2	BBC Hereford & Worcester
97.6 MHZ	0.8	Hits Radio Herefordshire & Worcestershire
98.2 MHz	10	BBC Radio 1
100.4 MHz	4.8	Classic FM
106.2 MHz	1.6	Sunshine Radio

=== Digital (DAB) ===
Frequency	Block	kW	Operator
216.928 MHz	11A	2	SDL National
222.064 MHz	11D	5	Digital One
223.936 MHz	12A	4	MuxCo Hereford & Worcester
225.648 MHz	12B	10	BBC National DAB

=== Television ===
==== Digital ====
Frequency	UHF	kW	Operator	System
474.166 MHz	21+	10	SDN	DVB-T
482.166 MHz	22+	20	BBC B	DVB-T2
498.000 MHz	24	10	Arqiva A	DVB-T
506.000 MHz	25	20	Digital 3&4 (Central)	DVB-T
522.000 MHz	27	10	Arqiva B	DVB-T
530.000 MHz	28	20	BBC A	DVB-T
538.000 MHz	29	2	ITV (West)	DVB-T
746.000 MHz	55	10	COM 7	DVB-T2

==== Pre-Switchover ====
Frequency	UHF	kW	Operator
642.000 MHz	42	2	Arqiva (Mux C)
666.000 MHz	45	2	Arqiva (Mux D)
730.000 MHz	53	2	BBC (Mux 1)
762.000 MHz	57	2	Digital 3&4 (Mux 2)
786.000 MHz	60	2	SDN (Mux A)
810.000 MHz	63	2	BBC (Mux B)

=== Analogue television ===
Since April 2011, analogue television has not been broadcast from Ridge Hill. BBC2 was closed on 6 April and the remaining five services on 20 April.

Frequency	UHF	kW	Service
479.25 MHz	22	100	BBC1 West Midlands
503.25 MHz	25	100	Central
527.25 MHz	28	100	BBC2 West Midlands
543.25 MHz	30	25 (D)	HTV West
559.25 MHz	32	100	Channel 4
583.25 MHz	35	100	Channel 5

== See also ==
- List of tallest buildings and structures in Great Britain
- Arqiva
