= Winter Hill transmitting station =

Telecommunications site in Lancashire, England

Winter Hill
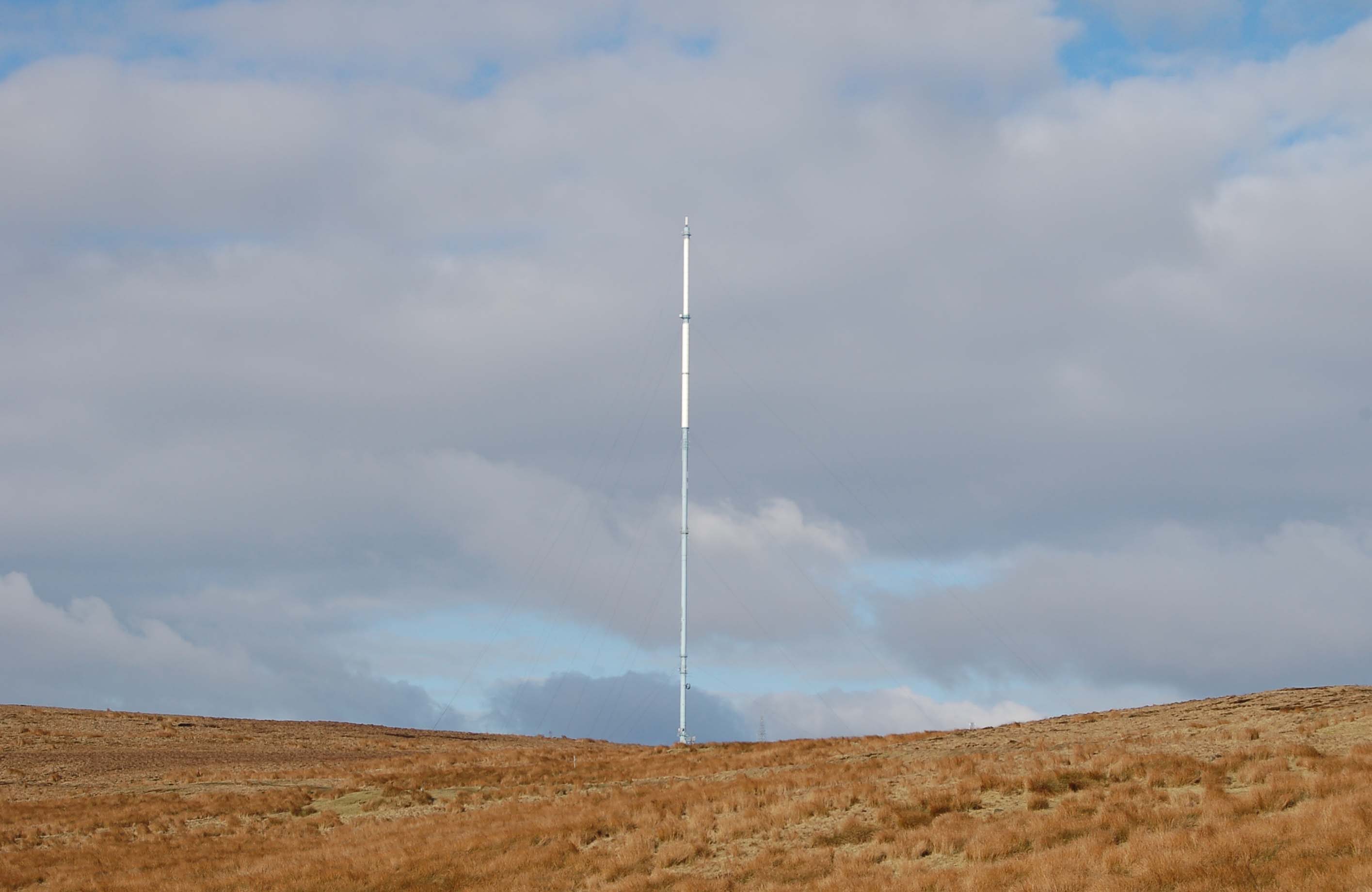

- Shown in North West England Shown in Lancashire Shown near Greater Manchester Shown in Chorley Borough Shown near Blackburn with Darwen
- Mast height: 309.48 metres (1,015.4 ft)
- Coordinates: 53.625556°N 2.514722°W
- Grid reference: SD660145
- BBC region: BBC North West
- ITV region: ITV Granada
- Local TV service: Bay TV Liverpool; That's Lancashire; That's Manchester

The Winter Hill transmitting station is a broadcasting and telecommunications site on Winter Hill, at the south eastern boundary of the Borough of Chorley, Lancashire, England, and above Bolton. It is owned and operated by Arqiva.

== Height ==
The original mast at Winter Hill was a 140-metre (450 ft) tower that came into service on 3 May 1956, and carried the programmes of Granada Television (weekdays) and ABC Weekend Television. In 1966 services were transferred to a new higher mast erected adjacent to the original tower. The main mast structure is 309.48 metres (1,015.4 ft) tall and has a diameter of 2.75 metres (9.0 ft). During the period of parallel digital and analogue transmissions, the DTT antenna attached to the top of the mast brought the overall height to 315.4 metres (1,035 ft), however as part of the Digital Switchover plans, this antenna has now been removed, reducing its overall height to 309.48 metres (1,015.4 ft). It is one of the tallest structures in the United Kingdom, the tallest being Skelton mast; however, at 778.1 metres (2,553 ft) above sea level, Winter Hill has the highest television transmitting antenna in the United Kingdom and is higher than Green Hill, the highest hill in Lancashire.

== Construction ==
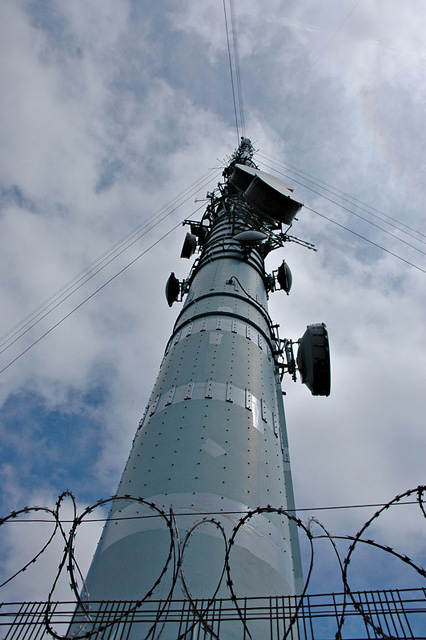
A view of the mast from beneath, illustrating the tubular structure

Unlike most masts, which are of a lattice design, Winter Hill mast is of a tubular construction. Three other masts in England share this design (Belmont, Mendip, and Waltham). Earlier structures at Emley Moor and Bilsdale were also of this design before being replaced, Emley following a collapse in 1969 and Bilsdale following a fire in 2021.

Support wires, to hold the mast vertical, are pitched at 120° when viewed from above. These are connected at five heights, giving 15 supports in total. These wires have been strengthened, and 152 metric tons (150 long tons) of dampening chains have been fitted by Arqiva (then NTL Broadcast) to reduce the oscillations caused by high winds that were a factor in the collapse of Emley Moor's original structure in 1969. During 2007 — 2009, the mast was strengthened to allow the installation of the new heavier digital transmission aerials. Its ropes weigh 85 tons, made by British Ropes, with steel from Steel, Peech and Tozer of Templeborough in southern Yorkshire. The column weighs 210 tons and has 375 segments, with steel from United Steel Companies at Scunthorpe in northern Lincolnshire.

== Maintenance ==
An advantage of the tubular design is that engineers can ascend the inside of the mast and avoid adverse weather, which is a problem on frame structures. Maintaining the outside of the mast is typically performed using a bosun's chair.

The mast has always had a series of red aircraft warning lights but in October 2006 these lights were substantially brightened making the mast far more visible to passing aircraft. These lights can be maintained from the inside, as the lamps swing inwards for maintenance.

Eight external platforms encircle the mast along its height. These can be accessed from the inside of the mast, and are used to maintain the supporting wires, and the ILR antennas.

== Coverage ==
The station's coverage includes approximately 6.3 million people. The coverage area is for mainly Greater Manchester, Merseyside, Lancashire, Cheshire and southern Cumbria along parts of Derbyshire, Staffordshire and North Yorkshire. Relay transmitters are needed around eastern Manchester, northern Lancashire and the Wirral peninsula. The transmitter also covers the North Wales coastal areas and although not the 'correct' television region, it is the preferred region for some in North Wales, mainly because it carries Channel 4 (as opposed to S4C, however since digital switchover Channel 4 is also available on all Welsh transmitters), Channel 5 and a much more powerful digital terrestrial output than the Welsh transmitters. The region's ITV franchisees, Granada Television (weekdays only until 1968) and ABC Weekend TV (launched in 1956), were on air much earlier than North Wales' franchisee, WWN (Teledu Cymru) which launched in 1962 (subsequently HTV Wales) giving viewers more choice than they would with the Welsh transmissions. ABC Television lost its franchise in 1968, when Granada Television commenced broadcasting seven days a week. Since the digital switchover, the Welsh transmitters are broadcasting DTT at a much higher power and Channel 4, and Channel 5 are now included in the line-up. However, because of the terrain and the rough landscapes of North Wales, many have likely stayed with Winter Hill, not least because small local relays only broadcast a limited range of multiplexes with a reduced number of channels.

== Output ==
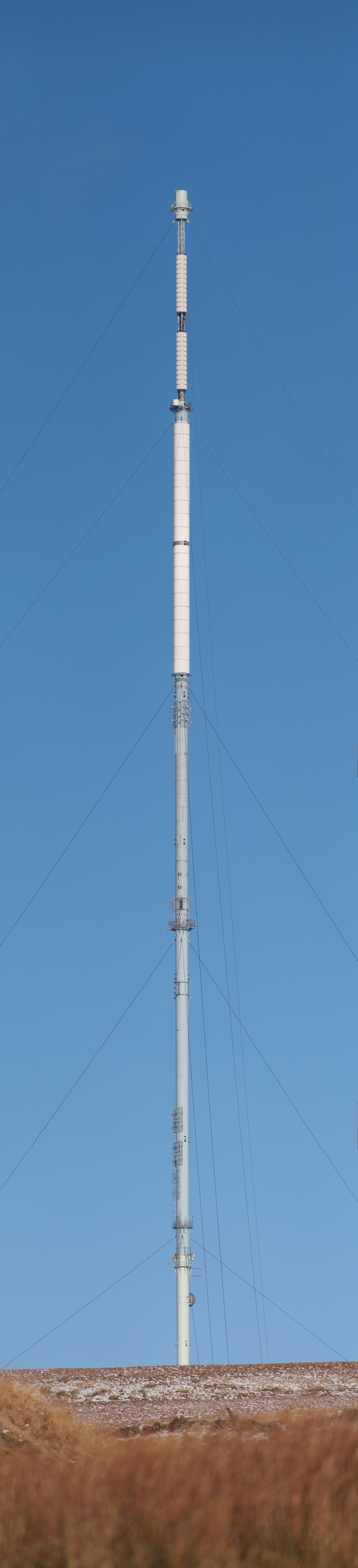
High resolution vertical panorama of the main mast

=== Television ===
==== Digital ====
Winter Hill is the principal transmitter for the North West region (formerly Granada ITV region) and in 2009 it became the first in the UK to broadcast digital television in high definition.

Winter Hill's 700MHz clearance will end on 10 February 2020 when, somewhat surprisingly, Winter Hill will become an A group (excluding MUX 7 which are due to be switched off before the end of 2020 anyway). Because the A group is the opposite end of the band from Winter Hill's C/D, people with original C/D group aerials in poor signal areas may struggle to pick up the signal.

Only four of the 70 Winter Hill relays broadcast six digital multiplexes (Lancaster, Saddleworth, Pendle Forest and Storeton). All the others broadcast just the three public service multiplexes BBC A, BBC B and D3&4. Winter Hill also broadcasts a Manchester multiplex on Channel 27.

===== Present channels =====
These were moved around until February 2020 due to the 700MHz clearance.

| Frequency | UHF | kW | Operator | System |
|---|---|---|---|---|
| 474.000 MHz | 21 | 3 | LTVmux (Liverpool) | DVB-T |
| 498.000 MHz | 24 | 2 | LTVmux (Manchester) | DVB-T |
| 522.000 MHz | 27 | 1 | GImux (G_MAN) | DVB-T |
| 538.000 MHz | 29 | 100 | COM4 (SDN) | DVB-T |
| 554.000 MHz | 31 | 100 | COM5 (ARQ A) | DVB-T |
| 562.000 MHz | 32 | 100 | PSB1 (BBC A) | DVB-T |
| 578.000 MHz | 34 | 100 | PSB2 (D3&4) | DVB-T |
| 586.000 MHz | 35 | 100 | PSB3 (BBC B) | DVB-T2 |
| 602.000 MHz | 37 | 100 | COM6 (ARQ B) | DVB-T |
| 626.000 MHz | 40 | 4 | LTVmux (Preston) | DVB-T |

===== Before switchover =====
| Frequency | UHF | kW | Operator |
|---|---|---|---|
| 754.166 MHz | 56+ | 10 | BBC (Mux 1) |
| 786.166 MHz | 60+ | 10 | Arqiva (Mux C) |
| 810.166 MHz | 63+ | 10 | Arqiva (Mux D) |
| 834.166 MHz | 66+ | 10 | Digital 3&4 (Mux 2) |
| 842.166 MHz | 67+ | 10 | BBC (Mux B) |
| 850.166 MHz | 68+ | 10 | SDN (Mux A) |

==== Analogue ====
Analogue television transmissions ceased. BBC2 was switched off on UHF 62 on the 4th of November 2009, and the remaining 4 channels went on the 2nd of december 2009

| Frequency | UHF | kW | Service |
|---|---|---|---|
| 687.25 MHz | 48 | 12.5 | Channel 5 |
| 743.25 MHz | 55 | 500 | BBC1 North West |
| 775.25 MHz | 59 | 500 | Granada |
| 799.25 MHz | 62 | 500 | BBC2 North West |
| 823.25 MHz | 65 | 500 | Channel 4 |

=== Digital television ===
The following is a list of the television relays served by Winter Hill, including UHF channels for each multiplex it carries. Only Lancaster, Pendle Forest, Saddleworth and Storeton carry all the main 6 multiplexes and have done so since 1998 when Winter Hill also started broadcasting these channels. Before 2009, the Cornholme, Lydgate, Todmorden, Walsden and Walsden South transmitters in West Yorkshire also relayed signals from Winter Hill, until this was changed to relay Emley Moor in 2009.

| Transmitter | BBC A | D3&4 | BBC B | SDN | ARQA | ARQB |
|---|---|---|---|---|---|---|
| Austwick | 45 | 39 | 42 | —N/a | —N/a | —N/a |
| Backbarrow | 53 | 60 | 57 | —N/a | —N/a | —N/a |
| Bacup | 46 | 43 | 40 | —N/a | —N/a | —N/a |
| Barrow Town Hall | 44 | 41 | 47 | —N/a | —N/a | —N/a |
| Birch Vale | 46 | 43 | 40 | —N/a | —N/a | —N/a |
| Blackburn | 46 | 43 | 40 | —N/a | —N/a | —N/a |
| Bollington | 27 | 24 | 21 | —N/a | —N/a | —N/a |
| Brinscall | 21 | 24 | 27 | —N/a | —N/a | —N/a |
| Broadbottom | 45 | 42 | 39 | —N/a | —N/a | —N/a |
| Brook Bottom | 53 | 60 | 57 | —N/a | —N/a | —N/a |
| Burbage | 47 | 41 | 44 | —N/a | —N/a | —N/a |
| Buxton | 27 | 24 | 21 | —N/a | —N/a | —N/a |
| Cartmel | 28 | 25 | 22 | —N/a | —N/a | —N/a |
| Chaigley | 27 | 24 | 21 | —N/a | —N/a | —N/a |
| Chatburn | 26 | 23 | 29 | —N/a | —N/a | —N/a |
| Chinley | 53 | 60 | 57 | —N/a | —N/a | —N/a |
| Congleton | 44 | 41 | 47 | —N/a | —N/a | —N/a |
| Dalton | 46 | 43 | 40 | —N/a | —N/a | —N/a |
| Darwen | 45 | 39 | 42 | —N/a | —N/a | —N/a |
| Delph | 26 | 23 | 29 | —N/a | —N/a | —N/a |
| Dog Hill | 46 | 43 | 40 | —N/a | —N/a | —N/a |
| Elton | 27 | 24 | 21 | —N/a | —N/a | —N/a |
| Far Highfield | 52 | 56 | 48 | —N/a | —N/a | —N/a |
| Glossop | 28 | 25 | 22 | —N/a | —N/a | —N/a |
| Haslingden | 26 | 23 | 29 | —N/a | —N/a | —N/a |
| Haughton Green | 46 | 43 | 40 | —N/a | —N/a | —N/a |
| Ladder Hill | 26 | 23 | 29 | —N/a | —N/a | —N/a |
| Lancaster | 27 | 24 | 21 | 25 | 28 | 22 |
| Langley | 27 | 24 | 21 | —N/a | —N/a | —N/a |
| Lees | 28 | 25 | 22 | —N/a | —N/a | —N/a |
| Littleborough | 27 | 24 | 21 | —N/a | —N/a | —N/a |
| Macclesfield | 28 | 25 | 22 | —N/a | —N/a | —N/a |
| Manchester Hulme | 44 | 41 | 47 | —N/a | —N/a | —N/a |
| Melling HP | 57 | 60 | 53 | —N/a | —N/a | —N/a |
| Melling VP | 57 | 60 | 53 | —N/a | —N/a | —N/a |
| Middleton | 28 | 25 | 22 | —N/a | —N/a | —N/a |
| Millom Park | 28 | 25 | 22 | —N/a | —N/a | —N/a |
| Moss Bank | 27 | 24 | 21 | —N/a | —N/a | —N/a |
| Mottram in Longdendale | 46 | 43 | 40 | —N/a | —N/a | —N/a |
| Newchurch | 21 | 24 | 27 | —N/a | —N/a | —N/a |
| Norden | 53 | 57 | 60 | —N/a | —N/a | —N/a |
| North Oldham | 27 | 24 | 21 | —N/a | —N/a | —N/a |
| Oakenhead | 44 | 41 | 47 | —N/a | —N/a | —N/a |
| Over Biddulph | 57 | 53 | 60 | —N/a | —N/a | —N/a |
| Parbold | 41 | 44 | 47 | —N/a | —N/a | —N/a |
| Pendle Forest | 28 | 25 | 22 | 27 | 21 | 24 |
| Penny Bridge | 26 | 23 | 29 | —N/a | —N/a | —N/a |
| Portwood | 28 | 25 | 22 | —N/a | —N/a | —N/a |
| Prestbury | 46 | 43 | 40 | —N/a | —N/a | —N/a |
| Ramsbottom | 53 | 60 | 57 | —N/a | —N/a | —N/a |
| Ribblesdale | 41 | 44 | 47 | —N/a | —N/a | —N/a |
| Romiley | 44 | 41 | 47 | —N/a | —N/a | —N/a |
| Roose HP | 22 | 28 | 25 | —N/a | —N/a | —N/a |
| Roose VP | 22 | 28 | 25 | —N/a | —N/a | —N/a |
| Saddleworth | 45 | 39 | 42 | 33 | 36 | 48 |
| Skelmersdale | 46 | 43 | 40 | —N/a | —N/a | —N/a |
| Stavely-in-Cartmel | 46 | 43 | 40 | —N/a | —N/a | —N/a |
| Stockport | 24 | 21 | 27 | —N/a | —N/a | —N/a |
| Storeton | 28 | 25 | 22 | 23 | 26 | 29 |
| Stunningdale | 44 | 41 | 47 | —N/a | —N/a | —N/a |
| Trawden | 53 | 60 | 57 | —N/a | —N/a | —N/a |
| Urswick | 44 | 41 | 47 | —N/a | —N/a | —N/a |
| Walton-Le-Dale | 27 | 24 | 21 | —N/a | —N/a | —N/a |
| Wardle | 28 | 25 | 22 | —N/a | —N/a | —N/a |
| West Kirby | 27 | 24 | 21 | —N/a | —N/a | —N/a |
| Whaley Bridge | 45 | 39 | 42 | —N/a | —N/a | —N/a |
| Whalley | 46 | 43 | 40 | —N/a | —N/a | —N/a |
| Whitewell | 53 | 60 | 57 | —N/a | —N/a | —N/a |
| Whitworth | 28 | 25 | 22 | —N/a | —N/a | —N/a |
| Woodnook | 45 | 39 | 42 | —N/a | —N/a | —N/a |

=== Radio ===
==== FM ====
| Frequency | kW | Service |
|---|---|---|
| 88.6 MHz | 4† | BBC Radio 2 |
| 90.8 MHz | 4† | BBC Radio 3 |
| 93.0 MHz | 4† | BBC Radio 4 |
| 97.4 MHz | 2 | Hits Radio Lancashire |
| 98.2 MHz | 4† | BBC Radio 1 |
| 100.4 MHz | 5 | Smooth North West |
| 103.9 MHz | 2 | BBC Radio Lancashire |
| 105.4 MHz | 5 | Heart North West |

† Relays the signal from Holme Moss to cover south and central Lancashire

==== DAB ====
| Frequency | Block | kW | Operator |
|---|---|---|---|
| 213.360 MHz | 10C | 1.2† | Bauer Liverpool |
| 216.928 MHz | 11A | 20 | SDL National |
| 222.064 MHz | 11D | 10 | Digital One |
| 223.936 MHz | 12A | 1.5‡ | Lancashire |
| 225.648 MHz | 12B | 10 | BBC National DAB |
| 227.360 MHz | 12C | 3.5† | CE Manchester |

† Broadcasts from a directional aerial to cover Greater Manchester.

† Broadcasts from a directional aerial to cover flintshire North Wales (Rhyl, Prestatyn, Llanrwst, Llandudno and surrounding areas). From Moel-y-Parc.

‡ Broadcasts from a directional aerial to cover central Lancashire (Wigan, Preston, Southport, Blackpool and surrounding areas).

== Plane crash ==
On 27 February 1958, a Silver City Bristol 170 Freighter (G-AICS) travelling from the Isle of Man to Manchester crashed into Winter Hill (also known as Rivington Moor) several hundred yards away from the mast. Thirty-five people died and seven were injured. The weather that night was so severe that none of the engineers working in the transmission centre were aware of the crash. Several feet of snow hampered rescue efforts, and a snowcat vehicle had to be diverted from the A6 to cut a path for emergency vehicles.

== Timeline ==
- 1956: Granada Television (weekdays) & ABC Weekend TV commence black and white television broadcasting prior to main mast construction.
- 1958: Fatal plane crash kills 35 people, 7 survive.
- 1962: BBC commence broadcasting on VHF Channel 12 (including the Manchester version of Look North)
- 1965: Main mast is completed, replacing the old 450' construction, which is removed.
- 1965: BBC 2 UHF transmissions start.
- 1967: BBC2 UHF Colour Transmissions start.
- 1968: ABC Television loses franchise; Granada Television commences broadcasting seven days a week.
- 1968: ITA (Independent Television Authority) build the single storey engineering building.
- 1969: ITV and BBC1 transmit in colour on UHF.
- 1970: Relaying service set up with Emley Moor mast.
- 1974: Local radio stations set up wire frame ILR transmitters on the hill. ITA became IBA, following start of commercial radio broadcasting (in 1973).
- 1981: Channel 4 create additional engineering building.
- 1981: Occasional Channel 4 test transmissions start.
- 1982: Additional ILR transmitter put into operation for further local radio. Channel 4 commences transmission (on 2 November 1982).
- 1983: Channel 4 set up relay service.
- 1985: 405-line television ceases in the UK.
- 1989: NICAM stereo transmissions commence from the site.
- 1997: Channel 5 commences transmission
- 1998: Radio station Century 105 starts broadcasting from the main mast (became Real Radio, now HEART).
- 1998: Low power Digital TV transmission start.
- 2009: Analogue TV signals were switched off in two phases on Wednesday 4 November 2009 (BBC Two Switched off) and 2 December 2009 (remaining analogue channels).

== See also ==
- List of masts
- List of tallest structures in the United Kingdom
- List of radio stations in the United Kingdom
