= Stirling Transmitting Station =

Transmitter station in Stirling, Scotland

Coordinates: 56.0715°N 4.0577°W

Stirling Transmitting Station is a transmission facility on Earl's Hill south-west of Stirling, Scotland. It was built at the end of the 1950s for the radio navigation system Dectra with a 183 metres (600 ft) tall guyed mast radiator, which was used after shut-down of Dectra as a Decca transmitter. Broadcast radio FM and DAB services also operate from the site.

== Dectra and Decca ==
Decca and Dectra were hyperbolic radio navigation systems. Decca was first developed by UK company Decca Radar during World War II. It uses low frequency signals from beacons to allow the receiver to determine their position. Conventional navigation involves measuring the distance from two known locations, radio navigation works in a similar way but using radio direction finding.

Dectra was a modification of the Decca System designed for aviation. Dectra worked with larger antennas and with higher power to cover the Atlantic Ocean. It could only provide tracks rather than locations at long distances and VOR/DME was preferred by the ICAO. The Decca system closed down on 31 March 2000.

Stirling was on two Decca chains - North British (3B) and Northumberland (2A). It was a slave station in both chains. In the North British chain it was the purple station, broadcasting on a frequency of 70.538 kHz. In the Northumberland chain it was the red station, broadcasting on 112.607 kHz.

== Stirling site ==
The Decca mast was demolished in the early 2000s.

There are a number of masts on Earl's Hill including three that were used for Differential GPS, a system for nautical navigation which was discontinued in 2022.
