= MuxCo =

Digital Radio multiplex operator

MuxCo is an operator of digital radio in the United Kingdom. It is, in joint ventures, the operator of twelve local DAB ensembles in various parts of England and Wales. MuxCo is owned by Arqiva and Folder Media.

MuxCo initially partnered with local radio groups to bid for each local multiplex. It remains a shareholder in nine of them, whilst North West Wales and Mid and West Wales are now owned by Nation Broadcasting and the Channel Islands by Tindle CI Broadcasting. It continues to manage them on their behalf.

== Initial Wrexham and Cheshire Launch ==
The first launch, of the multiplex based in Wrexham and Cheshire, was planned for November 2012 but was pushed back to the beginning of 2013. Test transmissions from Moel-y-Parc began on Monday 11 March 2013 and from Wrexham Rhos on Tuesday 12 March 2013, with full transmissions from these two sites scheduled to commence on 18 March 2013. It was announced on 9 March 2013 that the third transmission site, St John's Beacon, would be added at a later date the multiplex was renamed Wrexham Chester and Liverpool.

== Licenses ==
Area	Award date	Frequency	Transmitter sites	Services commenced
Morecambe Bay	December 2019	11B (218.640 MHz)	Lancaster, Morecambe Bay, Kendal and Windermere	1 December 2021
Channel Islands	October 2019	12A (223.936 MHz)	Les Platons, Les Touillets	1 August 2021
Gloucestershire	January 2008	10C (213.360 MHz)	Churchdown Hill, Stroud, Blunsdon and Icomb Hill	18 October 2013
Hereford and Worcester	September 2007	12A (223.936 MHz)	Bromsgrove, Ridge Hill and Malvern	6 December 2013
Lincolnshire	February 2008	12A (223.936 MHz)	Belmont, Lincoln County Hospital, High Hunsley and Grantham	1 October 2015
Mid and West Wales	March 2008	12D (229.072 MHz)	Carmel, Preseli and Kilvey Hill, Greenhill	30 August 2013
North West Wales	June 2008	10D (215.072 MHz), 12D (229.072 MHz)	Arfon and Conwy	12 December 2014
North Yorkshire	December 2007	10C (213.360 MHz)	Bilsdale, Harlow Hill, Acklam Wold and Oliver's Mount	17 December 2014
Somerset	May 2008	10B (211.648 MHz)	Mendip, Taunton and Hutton	26 September 2014
Suffolk	August 2015	10C (213.360 MHz)	Mendlesham, Puttocks Hill and Warren Heath	7 October 2016
Surrey	April 2008	10C (213.360 MHz)	Reigate, Dorking, Guildford, Leatherhead, Crystal Palace and Hungry Hill	12 December 2013
Wrexham, Chester and Liverpool	September 2007	10D (215.072 MHz)	Moel y Parc, Wrexham Rhos and St John's Beacon	18 March 2013
