= The Wrekin transmitting station =

Broadcasting facility in Shropshire, England

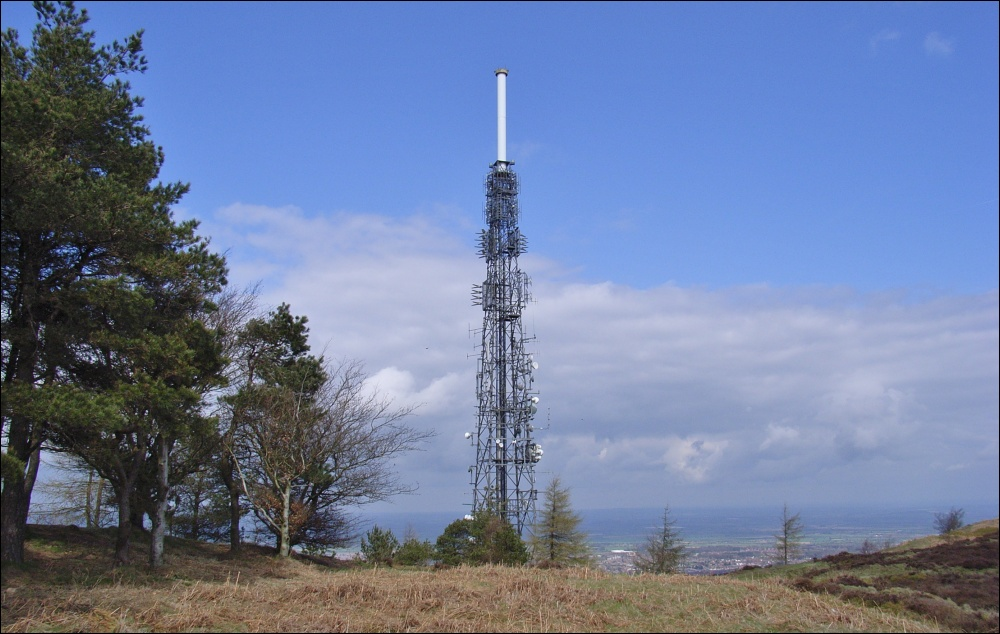
- The tower and antennas

- Location within Shropshire
- Location: Telford, Shropshire, England
- Tower height: 52 metres (171 ft)
- Coordinates: 52.671050°N 2.549788°W
- Grid reference: SJ628082
- Built: 1975
- BBC region: BBC West Midlands
- ITV region: ITV Central

The Wrekin transmitting station is a telecommunications and broadcasting facility on The Wrekin, a hill in the county of Shropshire, England. It includes a 52 metres (171 ft) tall free-standing lattice tower with transmitting antennas attached at various heights. The DTT transmitting arrays add about another 10m to this. It broadcasts digital television, alongside digital and FM (analogue) radio. The station was first proposed in 1966. As The Wrekin is a local beauty spot, many objections had to be overcome and alternative sites analysed before planning consent was given. The transmitter opened in 1975. The building is semi-underground and the tower stands on its roof.

== Television ==
The Wrekin serves a large part of North and Mid Shropshire including the towns of Shrewsbury, Telford and Oswestry.

This transmitter has 4 local relays: Buckhall, Clun, Coalbrookdale and Halesowen.

=== Digital ===
Frequency	UHF	kW	Operator	System
490.000 MHz	23	20	Digital 3&4	DVB-T
514.000 MHz	26	20	BBC A	DVB-T
545.833 MHz	30-	20	BBC B	DVB-T2
634.166 MHz	41+	10	SDN	DVB-T
658.000 MHz	44	10	Arqiva A	DVB-T
682.000 MHz	47	10	Arqiva B	DVB-T

==== Before switchover ====
Unlike analogue television, The Wrekin had a sub-transmission site, also known as The Wrekin B, designed to serve the east of the region, to fill areas in which the main transmitter didn't broadcast into. This was necessary due to co-channel interference issues with Moel-y-Parc, on channels 42, 45 and 49 (see external links). After digital switchover, the frequencies serving the east of the region were removed for compromise frequencies that has better reception in all areas of the region.

Frequency	UHF	kW	Operator
474.000 MHz	21	2	BBC (Mux 1)
498.166 MHz	24+	2	SDN (Mux A)
522.166 MHz	27+	2	BBC (Mux B)
554.000 MHz	31	2	Digital 3&4 (Mux 2)
618.166 MHz	39+†	2	BBC (Mux 1)
642.000 MHz	42†	2	SDN (Mux A)
666.000 MHz	45†	2	BBC (Mux B)
698.000 MHz	49†	2	Digital 3&4 (Mux 2)
730.000 MHz	53	1	Arqiva (Mux C)
762.000 MHz	57	1	Arqiva (Mux D)

† Transmitted from The Wrekin B.

=== Analogue ===
Analogue television was switched off during April 2011; BBC2 analogue was switched off on 6 April and BBC1 was moved to BBC2's old frequency, for its final weeks of service. and the remaining four on 20 April.

Frequency	UHF	kW	Service
487.25 MHz	23	100	Central
511.25 MHz	26	100	BBC1 Midlands
535.25 MHz	29	100	Channel 4
567.25 MHz	33	100	BBC2 Midlands
583.25 MHz	35	100	Channel 5

== Radio ==
Alongside television, the Wrekin broadcasts a number of local and national radio stations.

=== Analogue radio ===
Frequency	kW	Service
96.0 MHz	4.8	BBC Radio Shropshire
103.1 MHz	2.7	Hits Radio Black Country & Shropshire

=== Digital radio ===
Frequency	Block	kW	Operator
211.648 MHz	11A	4	SDL National
218.640 MHz	11B	0.5	NOW Wolverhampton
222.064 MHz	11D	8	Digital One
225.648 MHz	12B	5	BBC National DAB

== See also ==
- List of towers
