= Sutton Coldfield transmitting station =

Broadcasting and telecommunications facility in England

Sutton Coldfield
- Location within West Midlands county
- Location: Sutton Coldfield, Birmingham, England
- Mast height: 270.5 m (887 ft)
- Coordinates: 52°36′2″N 1°50′2″W
- Grid reference: SK113003
- Built: 1949
- BBC region: BBC West Midlands
- ITV region: ITV Central
- Local TV service: Made in Birmingham

The Sutton Coldfield transmitting station is a broadcasting and telecommunications facility located in Sutton Coldfield, Birmingham, England. In terms of population covered, it is the third most important transmitter in the UK, after Crystal Palace in London and Winter Hill near Bolton. It is the primary FM and DAB radio; and terrestrial television transmitter for the West Midlands conurbation.

== History ==
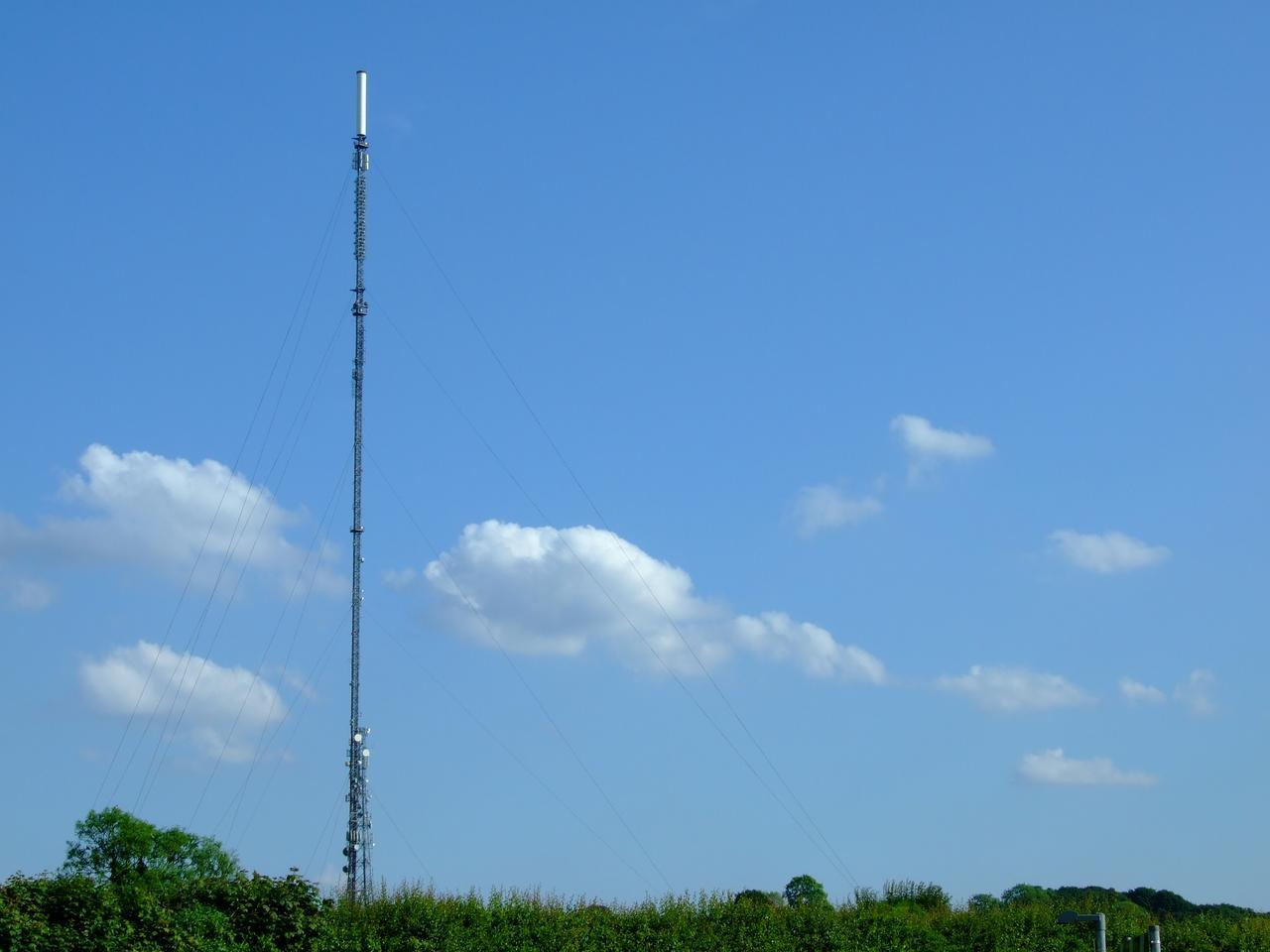
Sutton Coldfield's mast in June 2007

On 17 December 1949, it became the first television transmitter to broadcast outside London and the Home Counties, bringing BBC Television to viewers outside of the south-east of England for the first time.

In 1949 the site housed Britain's first post-war Band 1 405 line television transmitter. When it was taken out of service in 1981 it was one of the oldest working television transmitters in the world. It was actually two transmitters combined into a single antenna: T1 was a Marconi 12 kW sound transmitter of conventional design. T2 was the 50 kW vision transmitter. Its unusual design used high-level modulation dc-coupled to the final RF stage's grid. The modulator stages were built by EMI, most of the RF stages by Marconi and the power supplies by Metropolitan-Vickers. They were later supplemented by two Marconi medium-power reserves: T3 2 kW sound and T4 5 kW vision.

For most of 1965, it had a low-power BBC2 service; this was turned onto full power on 4 October 1965; the East Midlands had no BBC2 service until Waltham began transmissions on 31 August 1968.

A new mast was built around 1983 to replace the original structure, primarily to support new mixed-polarisation FM antennas.

A 788-foot (240 m) tall temporary mast was erected alongside the 1983 mast in the spring of 2009 while the latter's height was increased by 100 ft (30 m) to 887.5 ft (270.5 m). After four years in service and almost a year after the completion of digital switch over, the temporary mast was removed during August 2013.

All analogue TV transmissions ceased on 21 September 2011, as part of the digital switchover. This made it one of the oldest transmitters in the country to formally end analogue broadcasts.

== Services ==
With a mast height of 270.5 m (887 ft), it is one of the most powerful transmitters in England, powered at 200 kilowatts ERP for digital television and 250 kW for FM radio. The coverage extends as far south as Chipping Norton in Oxfordshire and as far north as Stoke-on-Trent. However, there are many relay transmitters around the Midlands that extend coverage even further.

The transmitter broadcasts eight digital television multiplexes, as well as VHF or FM transmitters for the four BBC national stations; the BBC's local service BBC WM on FM and DAB; independent national station Classic FM and local commercial radio stations Hits Radio Birmingham, Heart West Midlands, Greatest Hits West Midlands (previously Kerrang 105.2 until June 2013, Planet Rock until September 2015, and Absolute Radio until December 2018) and Smooth West Midlands.

When opened as a UHF TV transmitter, Sutton Coldfield was a B grouping, but with the advent of digital broadcasting one of the six muxes could not be fitted into the original B group due to co-channel considerations. Thus mux 6 was transmitted slightly out of band on UHF Channel 55, though this would still be receivable on most B group aerials.. In July 2007, it was confirmed by Ofcom that Sutton Coldfield would return to an undisputed B group transmitter post-digital switchover; a process that was completed on 21 September 2011.

An MF transmitter for Radio Birmingham (now BBC WM) used to be installed at this site, but could only be operated at 5 kW instead of the planned 10 kW because of interference to video equipment on the site. It was eventually replaced with a transmitter at the nearby Langley Mill MF site owned by Arqiva. This transmitter is currently used for the BBC Asian Network.

The station is now owned by Arqiva.

=== Radio ===
==== Analogue (FM) ====
Frequency	kW	Service
88.3 MHz	109.9	BBC Radio 2
90.5 MHz	109.9	BBC Radio 3
92.7 MHz	109.9	BBC Radio 4
95.6 MHz	11.4	BBC Radio WM
96.4 MHz	10	Hits Radio Birmingham
97.9 MHz	109.9	BBC Radio 1
100.1 MHz	219.8	Classic FM
100.7 MHz	11	Heart West Midlands
105.2 MHz	11	Greatest Hits Radio Birmingham & The West Midlands
105.7 MHz	11	Smooth West Midlands

==== Digital (DAB) ====
Frequency	Block	kW	Operator
211.648 MHz	11A	20	SDL National
222.064 MHz	11D	8.7	Digital One
225.648 MHz	12B	10	BBC National DAB

=== Television ===
==== Digital ====
Frequency	UHF	kW	Operator	System
594.000 MHz	36	1	Comux	DVB-T
618.166 MHz	39+	200	Arqiva B	DVB-T
626.166 MHz	40+	200	BBC B	DVB-T2
642.000 MHz	42	200	SDN	DVB-T
650.000 MHz	43	200	BBC A	DVB-T
666.000 MHz	45	200	Arqiva A	DVB-T
674.000 MHz	46	200	Digital 3&4	DVB-T
690.000 MHz	48	10	Comux	DVB-T

===== Before switchover =====
Frequency	UHF	kW	Operator
634.166 MHz	41+	8	BBC (Mux 1)
658.166 MHz	44+	8	Digital 3&4 (Mux 2)
682.166 MHz	47+	8	SDN (Mux A)
714.166 MHz	51+	8	BBC (Mux B)
722.166 MHz	52+	8	Arqiva (Mux C)
746.000 MHz	55	8	Arqiva (Mux D)

==== Analogue ====
Analogue television signals are no longer broadcast from Sutton Coldfield as of 21 September 2011. BBC2 was switched off on the 7th of September 2011, and ITV1 moved to BBC2's old frequency for its last 2 weeks of service. Multiplex 1 on 41 was switched off and replaced by BBC A on 43 (which hAVE JUST BEEN vacated by analogue ITV), BBC A launched with Full power. then SDN was moved from 47+ to 41, (till the 2nd stage). The remaining Analogue channels switched off on the 21st of September 2011. when the digital switchover was allowed the remaining Digital multipplexes to high powe

Frequency	UHF	kW	Service
623.25 MHz	40	1000	BBC2 West Midlands
647.25 MHz	43	1000	Central
671.25 MHz	46	1000	BBC1 West Midlands
703.25 MHz	50	1000	Channel 4

== Relays ==
The transmitter is served by a set of 35 local relays, delivering signals to areas shaded from it by hills and the curve of the Earth. These are:

- Allesley Park
- Brailes
- Bretch Hill
- Bridgnorth
- Brierley Hill
- Bromsgrove
- Cheadle
- Earl Sterndale
- Edgbaston
- Fenton
- Gib Heath
- Gravelly Hill
- Haden Hill
- Hamstead
- Harborne
- Hartington
- Ipstones Edge
- Ironbridge
- Kenilworth
- Kidderminster
- Kinver
- Leamington Spa
- Leek
- Long Compton
- Malvern
- Oakamoor
- Perry Beeches
- Queslett
- Redditch
- Repton
- Rugeley
- Tenbury Wells
- Turves Green
- Whittingslow
- Winchcombe
- Winshill
- Woodford Halse

== Digital switchover ==
Digital switchover took place at Sutton Coldfield in September 2011. In preparation for this, major engineering works took place at the station. The mast height was increased from 245 m (804 ft) to 270.5 m (887 ft) and the UHF television antennas were replaced. This was accomplished through the use of a temporary 240.2 m (788 ft) mast constructed to broadcast all the area's services so that the main mast could be worked on 'cold'.

As at other stations, the digital switchover took place in two stages:

In the first stage (7 September 2011):

- BBC Two analogue (Channel 40) closed down
- Low-power BBC multiplex (Mux 1) on channel 41 closed down
- Low-power SDN multiplex (Mux A) moved from channel 47 to channel 41 (until stage 2)
- ITV analogue moved from channel 43 to channel 40 (until stage 2)
- High-power multiplex BBC A started on channel 43

In the second stage (21 September 2011):

- BBC One analogue (Channel 46) closed down
- ITV analogue (Channel 40) closed down
- Channel 4 analogue (Channel 50) closed down
- Mux 1 (C41), Mux 2 (C44), Mux A (C47), Mux B (C51), Mux C (C52) and Mux D (C55) closed down
- All multiplexes increased in power to 200,000 watts (200 kW)
- New multiplexes came on air: SDN on C42, Arqiva A on C45, Arqiva B on C39, Digital 3&4 on C46 and BBC B on C40.

HD broadcasts were moved from the Lichfield transmitter to Sutton Coldfield on the BBC B multiplex (C40, 626.2 MHz). The Lichfield transmitter ceased the broadcast of all television services (Analogue Channel 5 and Digital BBC B (Mux HD)), with all six multiplexes being broadcast from Sutton Coldfield.

== See also ==
- Lichfield transmitting station
- List of masts
- List of radio stations in the United Kingdom
- List of tallest buildings and structures in Great Britain
