= Sandy Heath transmitting station =

TV and radio transmitter, Cambridgeshire, England

Sandy Heath
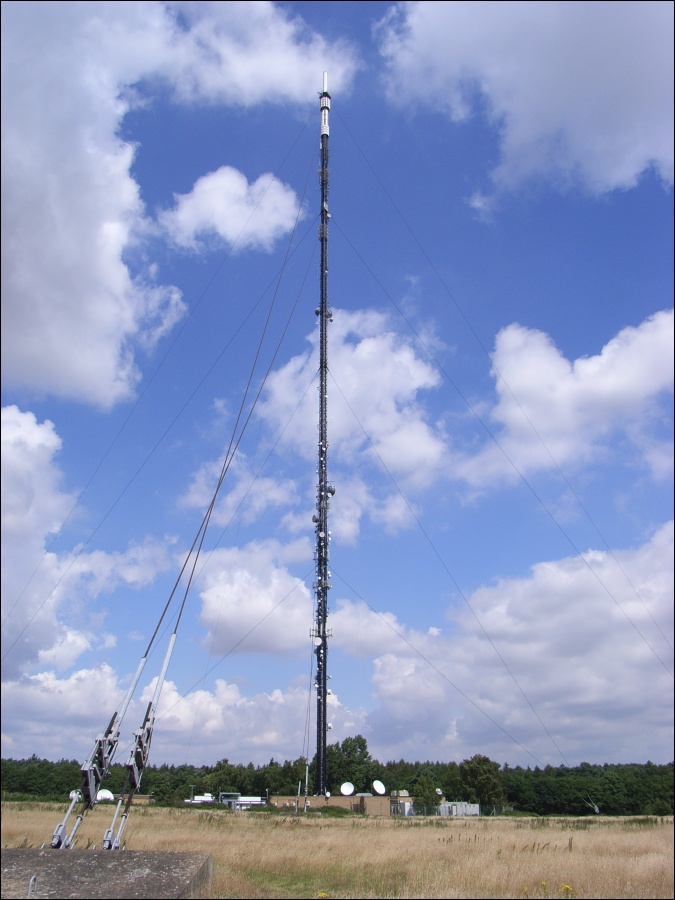

- Location within Bedfordshire
- Mast height: 244 metres (801 ft)
- Coordinates: 52.130139°N 0.241389°W
- Grid reference: TL2036249485
- Built: July 1965
- BBC region: BBC East
- ITV region: ITV Anglia
- Local TV service: That's TV Cambridge

Sandy Heath transmitting station is a television and radio broadcasting station in England, located between Sandy, Bedfordshire and Potton near the B1042. It is owned by Arqiva, formerly NTL Broadcast. It was built in 1965, originally broadcasting Anglia Television on VHF 405-lines, UHF with 625-line services of BBC2, BBC1, and Anglia Television being added by January 1971. It carried Channel 4 and Channel 5 from their launch days, Channel 5 at lower power than the other four services. Today it broadcasts digital television on the DTT platform as digital switchover took place on 13 April 2011. On 17 June 2018, as part of the 700MHz clearance, Com5 (ARQ A) moved from Ch52 to Ch36, Com7 (Arq C) moved from Ch32 to Ch55 and Com8 (Arq D) moved from Ch34 to Ch56

It is a K group or wideband TV transmitter (horizontal polarization), though an original A group aerial will still receive four of the main six muxes, in fact from Feb 2020 only MUX 4 (SDN) was out of the A group. During DSO, the digital transmission power for the PSB and commercial muxes increased from 20 kW to 180 kW and 170 kW respectively.

Sandy Heath is the main local TV transmitter for Bedfordshire, Cambridgeshire, Peterborough, Northamptonshire, North Hertfordshire as well as Stevenage, north Buckinghamshire (including Milton Keynes), parts of Essex (such as Saffron Walden and Harlow), parts of Suffolk (such as Newmarket and Haverhill) and parts of Leicestershire (including Market Harborough).

Sandy Heath has 3 relay stations which are located in Northampton, Kimpton, and Luton.

It also broadcasts the BBC local radio station BBC Three Counties Radio and the independent radio station Heart East, formerly Chiltern Radio.

== History ==
The Peterborough BBC mast opened on 5 October 1959, but had no ITV television broadcasting. The ITA referred to the 'Peterborough Bedford gap'. The only ITV broadcasting came from Lichfield or Mendlesham. Mendlesham was the tallest mast in the UK.

=== Construction ===
In June 1962 the planning approval for a 500 ft mast was given by Sandy Urban District. In April 1963 the new planning approval was given by Biggleswade Rural District for a 750 ft mast.

In April 1964 it would be a £80,000 lattice mast, made by BICC of Preston, with all steelwork galvanised by Painter Brothers of Hereford, and a transmitter from EMI Electronics.

By January 1965 it was under construction, where in April 1965 it was damaged by lightning, and had reached 750 ft by 23 April 1965.

=== Transmission ===
It cost £200,000. The IBA station would be unmanned, merely a satellite of Mendlesham.

It was opened by Charles Hill, Baron Hill of Luton for the ITA (Anglia TV), who arrived by Westland Wessex helicopter on Monday 5 July 1965. It would broadcast for 12 hours a day

By the end of 1965, it was hoped that nine ITA transmitters would be open.

From its start until late 1966, the transmitter could not broadcast schools programmes in the morning because the frequency (waveband) clashed with the Mullard Radio Astronomy Observatory in nearby Cambridgeshire. Anglia TV broadcast on channel 6 from noon to midnight, and the astronomy observatory operated on these frequencies during the morning.

From 1 May 1966, there were no restrictions on channel 6. In October 1966 it was planned to carry BBC2 from 1968. BBC2 on channel 27 arrived on 15 September 1969, with tests from 2 September 1969 at 9am, in colour.

In June 1970, BBC1 was expected in late 1970, on 625 lines. No BBC television was broadcast from the station on 405 lines. BBC1 had been received in the area from London; viewers in Cambridge had terrible reception.

Tacolneston began Anglia colour test broadcasts in late September 1970, but Anglia in colour was not expected until early 1971. Anglia was to go colour on 18 January 1971, but there was a pay dispute with the Association of Cinematograph, Television and Allied Technicians. Colour from Anglia arrived on Monday 8 February 1971. Anglia was about two years behind the BBC, with colour.

Test colour transmissions on BBC1 began on Monday 8 March 1971, with full colour from 22 March 1971. The BBC broadcast came from London, via the Peterborough mast. Tacolneston went colour on 1 October 1970 and Sudbury on 18 November 1970.

== Services listed by frequency ==
=== Analogue radio ===
| Frequency | kW | Service |
|---|---|---|
| 95.5 MHz | 1 | BBC Three Counties Radio |
| 96.9 MHz | 0.84 | Heart East |

=== Digital radio ===
| Frequency | Block | kW | Operator |
|---|---|---|---|
| 215.072 MHz | 10D | 1.7 | Herts, Beds & Bucks |
| 220.352 MHz | 11C | 0.72 | Cambridgeshire |
| 222.064 MHz | 11D | 4.7 | Digital One |
| 225.648 MHz | 12B | 5 | BBC National DAB |

=== Digital television ===
| Frequency | UHF | kW | Operator | System |
|---|---|---|---|---|
| 474.166 MHz | 21+ | 180 | BBC B | DVB-T2 |
| 498.000 MHz | 24 | 180 | Digital 3&4 | DVB-T |
| 522.000 MHz | 27 | 180 | BBC A | DVB-T |
| 570.000 MHz | 33 | 170 | SDN | DVB-T |
| 594.000 MHz | 36 | 170 | Arqiva A | DVB-T |
| 690.000 MHz | 48 | 170 | Arqiva B | DVB-T |

==== Before switchover ====
| Frequency | UHF | kW | Operator |
|---|---|---|---|
| 626.166 MHz | 40+ | 20 | Arqiva (Mux C) |
| 641.833 MHz | 42- | 20 | BBC (Mux 1) |
| 650.166 MHz | 43+ | 20 | SDN (Mux A) |
| 665.833 MHz | 45- | 20 | Digital 3&4 (Mux 2) |
| 674.166 MHz | 46+ | 20 | Arqiva (Mux D) |
| 842.000 MHz | 67 | 20 | BBC (Mux B) |

=== Analogue 625 line television ===
Analogue television services are no longer available. BBC Two was closed on 30 March 2011 and the remaining services on 13 April 2011.

| Frequency | UHF | kW | Service |
|---|---|---|---|
| 471.25 MHz | 21 | 1000 | Channel 4 |
| 495.25 MHz | 24 | 1000 | Anglia |
| 519.25 MHz | 27 | 1000 | BBC2 East |
| 551.25 MHz | 31 | 1000 | BBC1 East |
| 615.25 MHz | 39 | 10 | Channel 5 |
