= Belmont transmitting station =

Broadcasting and telecommunications facility in Lincolnshire, England

Belmont
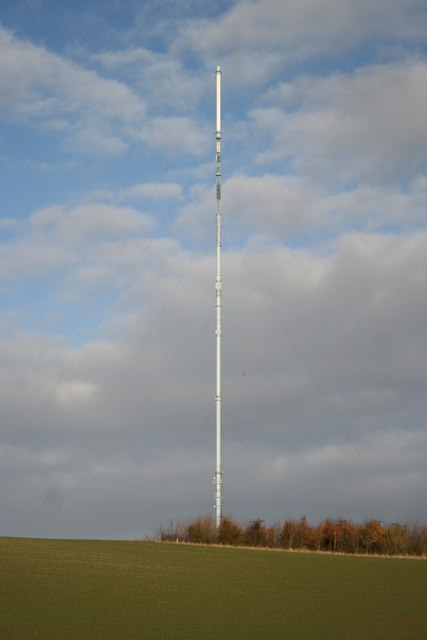
- Then the tallest structure in the UK, seen in November 2007

- Location within Lincolnshire
- Mast height: 1,154 feet (351.7 m)
- Coordinates: 53.335861°N 0.172°W
- Grid reference: TF217837
- Built: 1965 (height increased in 1967)
- BBC region: BBC Yorkshire (1965–2004); BBC Yorkshire and Lincolnshire (2004–present)
- ITV region: Anglia Television (1965–74); ITV Yorkshire (1974–present)
- Local TV service: That’s Humber

The Belmont Transmitting Station is a broadcasting and telecommunications facility next to the B1225, 1 mile (1.6 km) west of the village of Donington on Bain in the civil parish of South Willingham, near Market Rasen and Louth in Lincolnshire, England (grid reference TF217837). It is owned and operated by Arqiva.

It has a guyed tubular steel mast, with a lattice upper section. The mast was shortened in April 2010 and is now 1,154 feet (351.7 m) in height. Before this it was 1,272 feet (387.7 m) high and was considered to be the tallest structure of its kind in the world (taller masts, such as the KVLY-TV mast in the United States, use steel lattice construction), and the tallest structure of any type in the United Kingdom. After the top section was removed, the mast's reduced height relegated it to the second-highest in the UK after Skelton in Cumbria.

Despite the mast being shortened it can be seen in daylight on clear days from most areas close to and within the Lincolnshire Wolds. On clear nights its bright red aircraft warning lights can be very widely seen across much of Lincolnshire from as far north as the Humber estuary and Barton-Upon-Humber; from the west of the county it can be seen from Lincoln, Gainsborough and Grantham; from the south of the county it can be seen from Spalding and Bourne; and from the east it can be seen from Skegness, Mablethorpe and most areas along the Lincolnshire coast. The lights can also be seen from many parts of Nottinghamshire, coastal areas of North West Norfolk and a few parts of Derbyshire on very clear nights.

== Construction ==
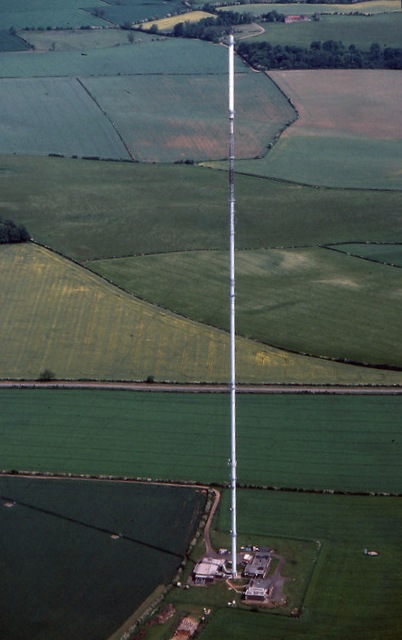
View from the air in July 1990

A planning application was made in October 1963 to Louth Rural District. Work had started by April 1964.

The foundations were laid on 30 June 1964. The concrete foundation was built by the end of October 1964, with tube sections being added from November 1964 at the site, near Benniworth.

It would be the seventh highest mast in the world. The first 900 ft would be a 9-ft diameter steel cylinder, with the rest a steel lattice. There would be a 12 ft cylinder around this lattice, with the top 150 ft being 9 ft wide. 1200 cubic feet of concrete was poured into its 32 square feet foundations. 12 people would work on the site.

The mast was constructed in 1965 and it came into service on 20 December of that year. As built it was a tubular pipe 900 feet (274.3 m) long by 9 feet (2.7 m) in diameter, surmounted by a 365 feet (111.3 m) lattice upper section (an identical mast was constructed in 1964 at Emley Moor near Huddersfield in Yorkshire, but the other mast collapsed due to guy failure caused by icing and high winds on 19 March 1969). Its ropes weigh 85 tons, made by British Ropes, with steel from Steel, Peech and Tozer of Templeborough in South Yorkshire. The column weighs 210 tons and has 375 segments, with steel from United Steel Companies at Scunthorpe in northern Lincolnshire.

In September 1967, meteorological equipment was added to the 1,265 feet (385.6 m) mast extending its height to 1,272 feet (387.7 m). The imperial measurement was the accepted value quoted by publications including the 1993 edition of the Guinness Book of Records. The metric measurement quoted by the current owners is 0.2 m (8 in) shorter.

Between October 2009 and April 2010, the mast was shortened as part of the Digital Switchover works. Most of the top section above the fifth stay level was removed (along with the sixth stay level) and the mast now stands 1,154 feet (351.7 m) high.

== Coverage ==
From its location, high in the Lincolnshire Wolds, it broadcasts digital television and both analogue and digital radio to Lincolnshire, eastern Yorkshire, northern parts of Norfolk and some eastern parts of Nottinghamshire. Belmont is the main transmitter that covers the cities of Hull and Lincoln. When it was first operated it transmitted (amongst others) ITV station Anglia Television. Following a re-organisation of ITV coverage in 1972, from 1974 it started transmitting neighbouring station Yorkshire Television instead, which it continues to do to this day.

== Transmission ==
Due to bad weather in late 1965, it did not offer a full ITV service until Monday 16 May 1966. BBC and VHF radio would start in autumn 1966. Emley Moor, its twin, came into full service on 15 August 1966.

The transmitters were not installed by the end of September 1966, but BBC equipment was being tested by early 1966, with full BBC service on Saturday 19 November 1966, and test transmissions from 5 November, with Peterborough able to receive these broadcasts. This was the same month that Pontop Pike also began transmissions. Tacolneston went into full service on 9 September 1967.

On 19 February 1969 wintry weather caused an eight-hour power cut, and staff were cut off by snow drifts, with a small amount of food. One month later, wintry weather brought down an identical mast, Emley Moor. Emley Moor was the highest man-made structure in Europe

The first colour tests from Monday 18 January 1971; Sandy Heath began full colour broadcasting on 8 February 1971; Tacolneston went colour on 1 October 1970.

Full colour on channel 22 for BBC1 began on Monday 15 February 1971, ITV would be later on Monday 24 May 1971.

It started stereo broadcasts on radio from Saturday 25 August 1973, along with other northern sites.

== Transmitter power ==
In the analogue era Belmont, at 500 kW E.R.P. for the four main analogue television channels, was one of the most powerful transmitters in the UK, though there were four UK transmitters which were more powerful; Sutton Coldfield, Crystal Palace and Sandy Heath were all at 1000 kW and Emley Moor was 870 kW. After digital switchover Belmont's digital transmitting power was 50 kW for SDN (previously Mux A), 100 kW for Arqiva A & B (Mux C, D) and 150 kW for BBC A, D3&4 and BBC B (Mux 1, 2, B).

== 700MHz clearance ==
On 4 March 2020, Belmont was due to complete its 700MHz clearance and will become an A group transmitter, excluding the temporary MUXES 7 and 8. Since Belmont started out as an A group for (just) analogue it returns to that band after being a wideband for 21 years. Technically the advent of C5 analogue complicated the issue for a few months prior to (dual) running digital transmissions started in 1998.

== Services listed by frequency ==
=== Analogue television ===
==== 20 December 1965 – 19 November 1966 ====
First transmissions from the site: ITV's 405-line television service was fed by off-air reception of Mendlesham at Great Massingham in Norfolk, with an onward microwave link to Belmont via an intermediate point at Winceby in Lincolnshire.

Frequency	VHF	kW	Service
184.75 MHz	7V	20	Anglia

==== 19 November 1966 – 24 May 1971 ====
The BBC's services came online on both VHF and UHF. BBC1 was initially fed by means of an off-air rebroadcast of Holme Moss but this was plagued by co-channel interference from the continent. BBC2 was an off-air rebroadcast from Emley Moor. On 19 March 1969, the Emley Moor mast collapsed, taking Belmont's BBC2 transmissions off-air for several days.

Despite the programme sources on VHF and UHF being (for many years) off-air rebroadcasts of other transmitters in the vicinity, Belmont was always regarded by the BBC as being a "main station" both on VHF and UHF. The IBA initially regarded it as a relay of Mendlesham (and numbered it 14.2 in their numbering of VHF stations) but from 1974 it became a "main station" for Yorkshire Television (renumbered as 20.0 in the IBA's numbering of VHF stations) after changes in the minor franchise areas.

It was always number 120.0 in the BBC/IBA numbering scheme for UHF stations).

Frequency	VHF	UHF	kW	Service
184.75 MHz	7V	—	20	Anglia
214.75 MHz	13V	—	20	BBC1 North
527.25 MHz	—	28	500	BBC2 North

==== 24 May 1971 – 30 July 1974 ====
ITV's UHF service began.

Frequency	VHF	UHF	kW	Service
184.75 MHz	7V	—	20	Anglia
214.75 MHz	13V	—	20	BBC1 North
479.25 MHz	—	22	500	BBC1 North
503.25 MHz	—	25	500	Anglia
527.25 MHz	—	28	500	BBC2 North

==== 30 July 1974 – 2 November 1982 ====
After changes to the regional structure of ITV in 1972, Belmont stopped being a relay of Mendlesham and became a main station for Yorkshire TV. It was fed by a Post Office (later BT) microwave link from Leeds, allowing Yorkshire TV to supply Belmont with a separate 7-minute segment of their regional news magazine programme "Calendar", a Belmont titled version of Anglia's weather forecast, as well as having the ability to sell advertising separately in the Belmont and Emley Moor areas. The microwave link from Leeds to Belmont apparently ran via Emley Moor, where the IBA could insert test transmissions, such as Test Card "F"

Frequency	VHF	UHF	kW	Service
184.75 MHz	7V	—	20	Yorkshire
214.75 MHz	13V	—	20	BBC1 North
479.25 MHz	—	22	500	BBC1 North
503.25 MHz	—	25	500	Yorkshire
527.25 MHz	—	28	500	BBC2 North

==== 2 November 1982 – 30 March 1997 ====
Both the BBC and ITV 405-line VHF TV services from Belmont were discontinued early in mid-1982, and when Channel 4 began formal transmissions in November that year it was radiated on UHF from the site:

Frequency	UHF	kW	Service
479.25 MHz	22	500	BBC1 North
503.25 MHz	25	500	Yorkshire
527.25 MHz	28	500	BBC2 North
559.25 MHz	32	500	Channel 4

==== 30 March 1997 – 15 November 1998 ====
Belmont started transmitting the UK's final terrestrial analogue UHF TV service: Channel 5. This was done well out-of-band and at reduced power compared with the main group.

Frequency	UHF	kW	Service
479.25 MHz	22	500	BBC1 North
503.25 MHz	25	500	Yorkshire
527.25 MHz	28	500	BBC2 North
559.25 MHz	32	500	Channel 4
751.25 MHz	56	50	Channel 5

=== Analogue and digital television ===
==== 15 November 1998 – 3 August 2011 ====
Belmont began transmitting digital TV, with the new digital multiplexes spaced far from the existing analogue channels. In July 2007 it was confirmed by Ofcom that Belmont would be remaining a wideband transmitter after digital switchover.

Frequency	UHF	kW	Service/Operator	System
479.25 MHz	22	500	BBC One	PAL System I
503.25 MHz	25	500	Yorkshire	PAL System I
527.25 MHz	28	500	BBC Two	PAL System I
546.000 MHz	30	10	BBC (Mux 1)	DVB-T
559.25 MHz	32	500	Channel 4	PAL System I
690.000 MHz	48	20	Digital 3&4 (Mux 2)	DVB-T
751.25 MHz	56	50	Channel 5	PAL System I
762.166 MHz	57+	4	Arqiva (Mux D)	DVB-T
786.000 MHz	60	4	Arqiva (Mux C)	DVB-T
834.000 MHz	66	10	BBC (Mux B)	DVB-T
850.000 MHz	68	10	SDN (Mux A)	DVB-T

==== 3 August 2011 – 17 August 2011 ====
BBC2 closed on UHF 28. BBC1 was moved on to that channel for its final three weeks of service. Pre-DSO Multiplex 1 (BBC) on UHF 30 was closed and was replaced by BBC A on UHF 22 (which have just been vacated by Analogue BBC1).

Frequency	UHF	kW	Service/Operator	System
482.000 MHz	22	150	BBC A	DVB-T
503.25 MHz	25	500 ITV Yorkshire	PAL System I	
527.25 MHz	28	500	BBC One	PAL System I
559.25 MHz	32	500 Channel 4	PAL System I	
690.000 MHz	48	20	Digital 3&4 (Mux 2)	DVB-T
751.25 MHz	56	50	Channel 5	PAL System I
762.166 MHz	57+	4	Arqiva (Mux D)	DVB-T
786.000 MHz	60	4	Arqiva (Mux C)	DVB-T
834.000 MHz	66	10	BBC (Mux B)	DVB-T
850.000 MHz	68	10	SDN (Mux A)	DVB-T

=== Digital television ===
==== 17 August 2011 – 26 November 2013 ====
All the remaining analogue and existing digital signals were turned off and replaced with higher-power digital signals.

Frequency	UHF	kW	Operator	System
482.000 MHz	22	150	BBC A	DVB-T
506.000 MHz	25	150	Digital 3&4	DVB-T
530.000 MHz	28	150	BBC B	DVB-T2
545.833 MHz	30-	50	SDN	DVB-T
730.000 MHz	53	100	Arqiva A	DVB-T
786.000 MHz	60	100	Arqiva B	DVB-T

- Arqiva A and Arqiva B were limited to 4 kW until 23 November 2011, when they were increased to 100 kW.

==== 26 November 2013 – 4 February 2020 ====
Local TV, carrying Estuary TV, and Arqiva C, carrying additional HD services, launched on 26 November 2013.

Frequency	UHF	kW	Operator	Multiplex	System
482.000 MHz	22	150	BBC A	PSB1	DVB-T
506.000 MHz	25	150	Digital 3&4	PSB2	DVB-T
530.000 MHz	28	150	BBC B	PSB3	DVB-T2
545.833 MHz	30-	50	SDN	COM4	DVB-T
562.000 MHz	32	5	Local TV	LOC	DVB-T
570.000 MHz	33	37.1	Arqiva C	COM7	DVB-T2
730.000 MHz	53	100	Arqiva A	COM5	DVB-T
754.000 MHz	56	39	Arqiva D	COM8	DVB-T2
786.000 MHz	60	100	Arqiva B	COM6	DVB-T

==== 5 February 2020 – 3 March 2020 ====
Arqiva A moved from UHF 53 to UHF 23, in accordance with the 700MHz clearance.

Frequency	UHF	kW	Operator	Multiplex	System
482.000 MHz	22	150	BBC A	PSB1	DVB-T
490.000 MHz	23	75	Arqiva A	COM5	DVB-T
506.000 MHz	25	150	Digital 3&4	PSB2	DVB-T
530.000 MHz	28	150	BBC B	PSB3	DVB-T2
545.833 MHz	30-	64	SDN	COM4	DVB-T
562.000 MHz	32	5	Local TV	LOC	DVB-T
746.000 MHz	55	37.1	Arqiva C	COM7	DVB-T2
754.000 MHz	56	39	Arqiva D	COM8	DVB-T2
786.000 MHz	60	100	Arqiva B	COM6	DVB-T

==== 4 March 2020 – 24 June 2020 ====
Arqiva B moved from UHF 60- to UHF 26, and a power increase of the Local multiplex, in accordance with the 700MHz clearance.

Frequency	UHF	kW	Operator	Multiplex	System
482.000 MHz	22	150	BBC A	PSB1	DVB-T
490.000 MHz	23	75	Arqiva A	COM5	DVB-T
506.000 MHz	25	150	Digital 3&4	PSB2	DVB-T
514.000 MHz	26	75	Arqiva B	COM6	DVB-T
530.000 MHz	28	150	BBC B	PSB3	DVB-T2
545.833 MHz	30-	64	SDN	COM4	DVB-T
562.000 MHz	32	10	Local TV	LOC	DVB-T
746.000 MHz	55	37.1	Arqiva C	COM7	DVB-T2
754.000 MHz	56	39	Arqiva D	COM8	DVB-T2

==== 25 June 2020 – Present ====
COM 8 was switched off permanently in accordance with the 700MHz clearance programme.

Frequency	UHF	kW	Operator	Multiplex	System
482.000 MHz	22	150	BBC A	PSB1	DVB-T
490.000 MHz	23	75	Arqiva A	COM5	DVB-T
506.000 MHz	25	150	Digital 3&4	PSB2	DVB-T
514.000 MHz	26	75	Arqiva B	COM6	DVB-T
530.000 MHz	28	150	BBC B	PSB3	DVB-T2
545.833 MHz	30-	64	SDN	COM4	DVB-T
562.000 MHz	32	10	Local TV	LOC	DVB-T
746.000 MHz	55	37.1	Arqiva C	COM7	DVB-T2

=== Analogue radio (FM VHF) ===
==== 19 November 1966 – 11 November 1980 ====
Frequency	kW	Service
88.8 MHz	8	BBC Light Programme (later BBC Radio 2)
90.9 MHz	8	BBC Third Programme (later BBC Radio 3)
93.1 MHz	8	BBC Home Service (later BBC Radio 4)

==== 11 November 1980 – February 1992 ====
BBC Radio Lincolnshire started broadcasting. BBC Radio 1 officially launched in 98.3 on 27 July 1990

Frequency	kW	Service
88.8 MHz	16	BBC Radio 2
90.9 MHz	16	BBC Radio 3
93.1 MHz	16	BBC Radio 4
94.9 MHz	6	BBC Radio Lincolnshire
98.3 MHz	16	BBC Radio 1

==== February 1992 – present day ====
Lincs FM (launched 1 March 1992) and Classic FM (launched 1 September 1992) join the set of FM broadcasts.

Frequency	kW	Service
88.8 MHz	16	BBC Radio 2
90.9 MHz	16	BBC Radio 3
93.1 MHz	16	BBC Radio 4
94.9 MHz	6	BBC Radio Lincolnshire
98.3 MHz	16	BBC Radio 1
100.5 MHz	6.2	Classic FM
102.2 MHz	6.4	Greatest Hits Radio Lincolnshire

=== Digital radio (DAB) ===
Frequency	Block	kW	Service
223.936 MHz	12A	—	MuxCo Lincolnshire
216.928 MHz	11A	—	Sound Digital
222.064 MHz	11D	5	Digital One
225.648 MHz	12B	5	BBC National DAB

== Relays ==
Below is a list of transmitters that relay Belmont.

=== Digital television ===
transmitter	kW	BBC-A	BBC-B	D3&4	SDN	ARQ-A	ARQ-B	Pol.
Grimsby	0.002	45	39	42	—N/a	—N/a	—N/a	BV
Lincoln Central	0.02	44	47	41	—N/a	—N/a	—N/a	BV
Weaverthorpe	0.009	39	45	42	—N/a	—N/a	—N/a	BV

== See also ==
- List of tallest buildings and structures
- List of tallest structures in the United Kingdom
- List of masts
- List of radio stations in the United Kingdom

Records
Preceded by Gerbrandy Tower; 1,255 ft (382.5 m)	Tallest structure in EU; 1,272 ft (387.7 m); 1973–2010	Succeeded by Torreta de Guardamar; 1,210 ft (368.8 m)
