= Waltham transmitting station =

Television and radio transmitter at Melton, Leicestershire

Waltham
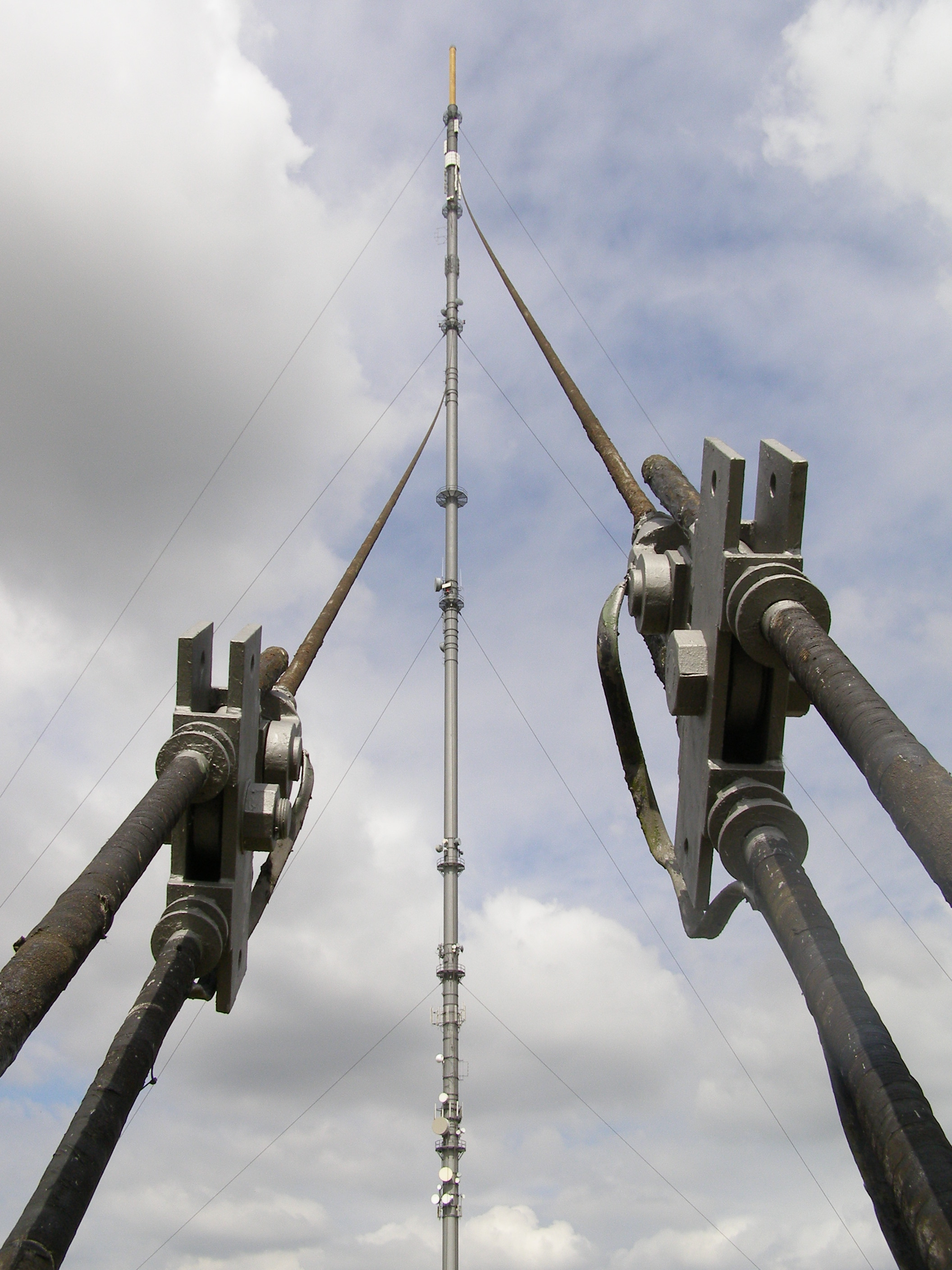

- Location within Leicestershire
- Location: Waltham-on-the-Wolds, Leicestershire
- Mast height: 315 metres (1,033 ft)
- Coordinates: 52°48′N 0°48′W
- Grid reference: SK809233
- Built: 1966 (original); 1968 (current)
- Collapsed: 1966 (original)
- BBC region: BBC East Midlands
- ITV region: ITV Central
- Local TV service: Notts TV (former)

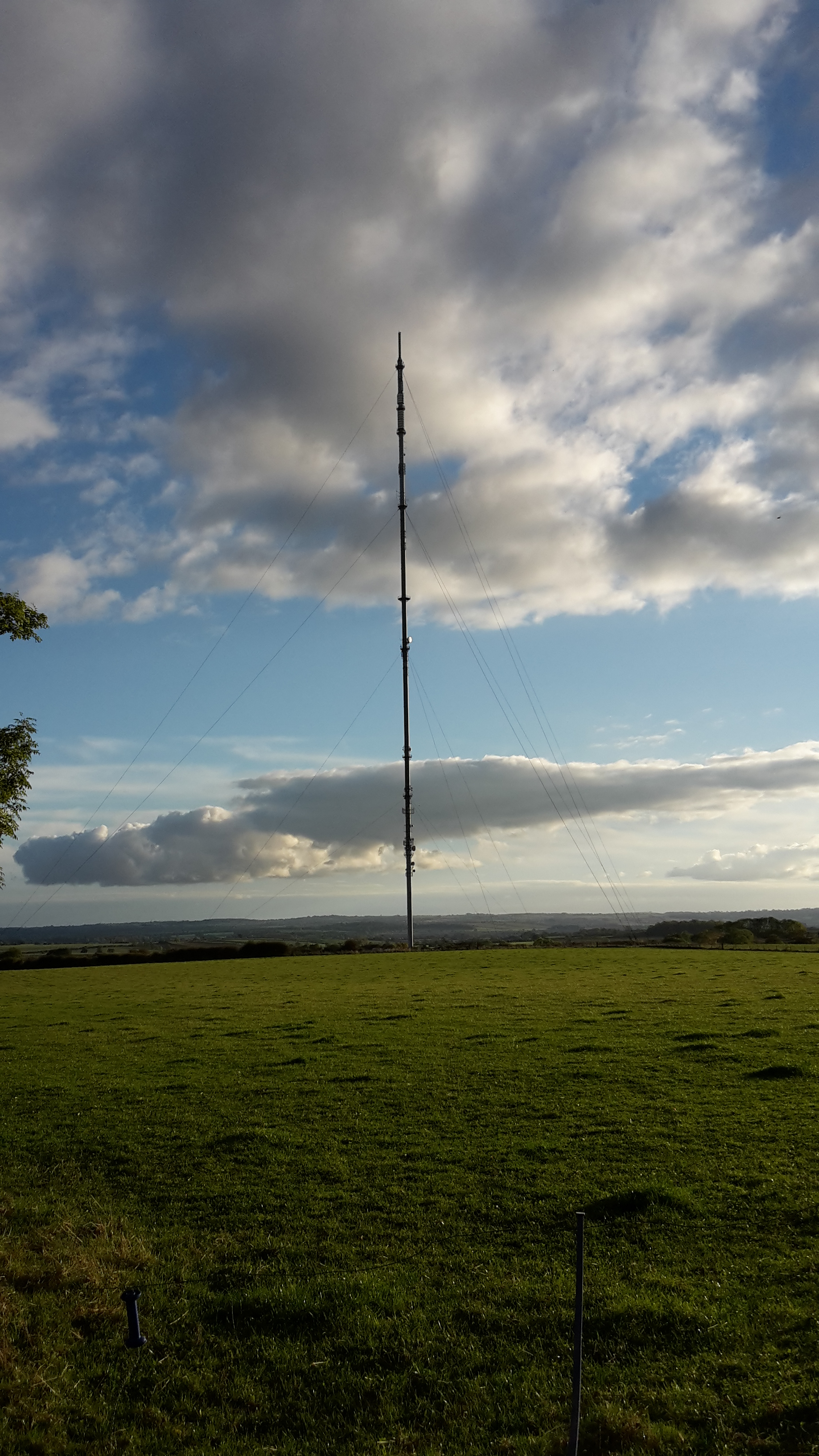
Waltham on the Wolds transmitter, near Melton Mowbray, Leicestershire, England

The Waltham transmitting station is a broadcasting and telecommunications facility at Waltham-on-the-Wolds, 5 miles (8 km) north-east of Melton Mowbray. It sits inside the Waltham civil parish near Stonesby, in the district of Melton, Leicestershire, UK. It has a 315 metres (1,033 ft) guyed steel tubular mast. The main structure height to the top of the steelwork is 290.8 metres (954 ft), with the UHF television antennas contained within a GRP shroud mounted on top.

== Construction ==
=== First structure ===
The first mast was built in 1966. On 16 November 1966, it collapsed. Parts of the wreckage are still in use as pig shelters. It had been built by the British Insulated Cables Construction Company. It was to have begun broadcasts in the summer of 1967.

=== Second structure ===
The structure was rebuilt in 1968 by the BBC. This delayed its first transmissions until 31 August 1968 of BBC2 only. It broadcast ITV from February 1970 and BBC1 from August 1970. On 9 April 1970, the whole region lost the signal when an excavator damaged the station's main cable. The mast was one of three similar types built at the same time by the BBC, with Mendip and Bilsdale.

It is a shorter version of the second Emley Moor transmitter which collapsed whilst broadcasting on 19 March 1969, due to the weight of ice on the structural cables. The Waltham mast has four sets of stay levels as opposed to the six of the former Emley mast. The latter was identical to the current 385m high Belmont mast, both built by the ITA.

It is east of the A607 between Grantham and Melton Mowbray.

== Coverage ==
The mast was originally built to provide BBC2 (on the new UHF 625 lines system) to the East Midlands. It became the main mast for ITV's Central East Midlands from 1982 and BBC East Midlands from 1991. Previously it had carried broadcasts from Birmingham. NICAM was transmitted from 31 March 1992.

It is now the main TV transmitter for all digital terrestrial channels covering the East Midlands, predominantly including most of Leicestershire, Rutland, Nottinghamshire, Derbyshire and parts of Lincolnshire. Waltham is the main transmitter that covers the cities of Nottingham, Leicester and Derby. It can also be received in parts of Norfolk, Staffordshire, Cambridgeshire and Northamptonshire. It is owned and operated by Arqiva.

=== Digital TV ===
Waltham first broadcast digital TV on 15 November 1998. In July 2007 it was confirmed by Ofcom that at DSO (Digital Switchover) Waltham would be transmitting five – of the six – MUXes within its original C/D group. For reception of all 6 MUXES a wideband is required. When Waltham undertook the 700 MHz clearance in 2020, it became an A group. MUXES 7 and 8 became redundant before the end of 2022.

=== Relay stations ===
The two most powerful relays are at Nottingham situated west of the M1 J26 (covering the whole city and surrounding areas) and at Stanton Moor near Bakewell (covering the Peak District) The Nottingham relay at Kimberley began on 30 March 1973, following tests from late February 1973. Channel 4 arrived on 10 February 1984, 15 months after Waltham.

Waltham has also 13 low-power relay stations located in Derby, Leicester, Ashbourne, Matlock, Belper, Birchover, Darley Dale, Ambergate, Ashford in the Water, Parwich, Eastwood, Little Eaton and Stamford.

== Transmitted services ==
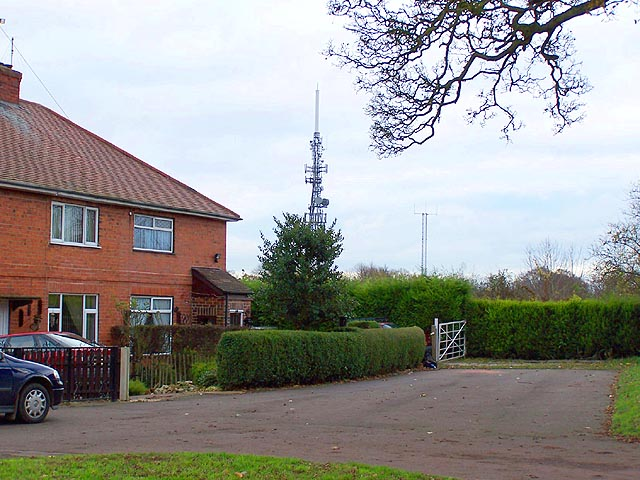
Relay station at Swingate, west of the M1/A610 Junction 26, is the 2kW Nottingham transmitter which went digital in April 2011

=== Analogue radio ===
Frequency	kW	Service
106.6 MHz	10.8	Smooth East Midlands

=== Digital radio (DAB) ===
Frequency	Block	kW	Operator
222.064 MHz	11D	8.8	Digital One
225.648 MHz	12B	5	BBC National DAB
227.360 MHz	12C	4	NOW Nottingham

=== Digital television ===
On 4 March 2020, the following channels came into use as a result of the 700 MHz clearance programme.

Frequency	UHF	kW	Operator	System
538.000 MHz	29	25	COM4 (SDN)	DVB-T
554.000 MHz	31	25	COM6 (ARQ B)	DVB-T
562.000 MHz	32	50	PSB1 (BBC A)	DVB-T
578.000 MHz	34	50	PSB2 (D3&4)	DVB-T
586.000 MHz	35	50	PSB3 (BBC B)	DVB-T2
602.000 MHz	37	25	COM5 (ARQ A)	DVB-T
634.000 MHz	41	2	LTVmux	DVB-T

==== Before 700MHz clearance ====
Prior to 4 March 2020, the following channels were used.

Frequency	UHF	kW	Operator	System
514.000 MHz	26	5	LTVmux	DVB-T
538.000 MHz	29	25	COM4 (SDN)	DVB-T
554.000 MHz	31	10.2	COM7 (ARQ C)	DVB-T2
602.000 MHz	37	25	COM5 (ARQ A)	DVB-T
698.000 MHz	49	50	PSB1 (BBC A) (Note: In May 2013, BBC A moved from UHF 61 to UHF 49.)	DVB-T
737.833 MHz	54-	50	PSB2 (D3&4)	DVB-T
754.000 MHz	56	1.4	COM8 (ARQ D)	DVB-T2
762.000 MHz	57	25	COM6 (ARQ B)	DVB-T
770.000 MHz	58	50	PSB3 (BBC B)	DVB-T2

==== Before switchover ====
Frequency	UHF	kW	Operator
490.000 MHz	23	8	Digital 3&4 (Mux 2) (Note: Broadcast on UHF 23 until 29 March 2011.)
514.000 MHz	26	8	SDN (Mux A) (Note: Broadcast on UHF 26 until 29 March 2011.)
570.000 MHz	33	8	BBC (Mux B)
642.000 MHz	42	5	Arqiva (Mux D)
666.000 MHz	45	5	Arqiva (Mux C)
698.000 MHz	49	10	BBC (Mux 1) (Note: Multiplex 1 (BBC) on UHF 49 was closed on 17 August 2011 and replaced by BBC A on UHF 61.)

=== Analogue television ===
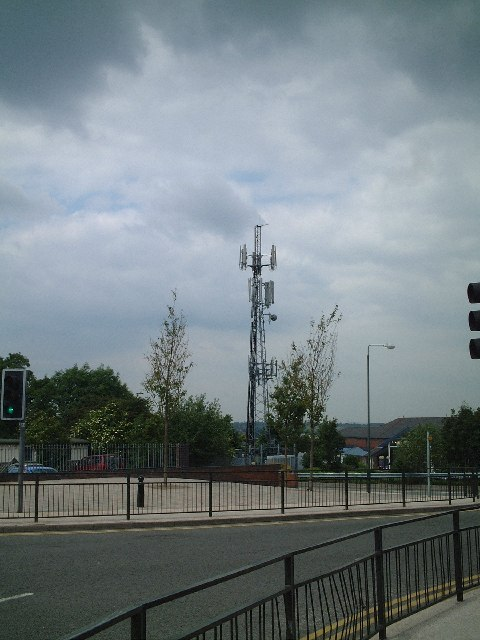
Relay station at Eastwood

Analogue television is no longer transmitted from Waltham. BBC Two closed on UHF 64 on 17 August 2011. ITV1 was moved into its frequency at the time and the BBC A multiplex began transmitting on UHF 61. The remaining four analogue channels were switched off on 31 August.

Frequency	UHF	kW	Service
583.25 MHz	35	250	Channel 5
735.25 MHz	54	250	Channel 4
767.25 MHz	58	250	BBC1 East Midlands
791.25 MHz	61	250	Central
815.25 MHz	64	250	BBC2 East Midlands
