= Oxford transmitting station =

Telecommunications site near Oxford, England

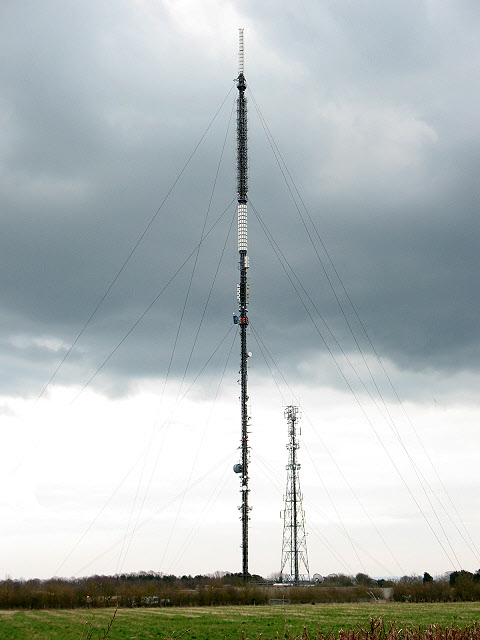
- Oxford Transmitting Station

- Location within Oxfordshire
- Mast height: 165.7 metres (544 ft)
- Coordinates: 51.790556°N 1.179167°W
- Grid reference: SP567105
- Built: 1962 (original); 1968 (current)
- BBC region: BBC South (Oxford)
- ITV region: ATV (1970–1981); ITV Central (1982–2006); ITV Thames Valley (2006–2009); ITV Meridian (Thames Valley) (2009–present)
- Local TV service: That's Oxfordshire

The Oxford transmitting station (sometimes known as the Beckley transmitter) is a broadcasting and telecommunications facility, situated on land 129.5 metres (425 ft) above Ordnance Datum (mean sea level) to the north east of the city of Oxford, in Oxfordshire, England (grid reference SP567105). It has a guyed steel lattice mast which is 154.4 metres (507 ft) in height to the top of the main steel structure. The UHF television antenna, which consist of a vertical array of transmitting panels, is mounted above the steel structure. The total height of the mast to the top of this UHF antenna is 165.7 metres (544 ft). It is owned and operated by Arqiva.

== History ==
=== Analogue and digital television ===
- The station was originally constructed by the BBC during the early 1960s to provide the BBC's VHF/FM national and regional radio networks and the BBC-TV service on 405-line VHF to the city of Oxford and the surrounding area. The mast carried a two-tier Band I array above a six-tier slot array for Band II FM. A smaller 150-foot tower in the western corner of the site carried receiving aerials.
- The station was extended in 1968, having been chosen as a suitable site for high power colour UHF transmissions, which entered service on 17 February 1968 carrying BBC Two. BBC One followed in May 1970 and ITV (ATV) in June of the same year. Channel 4 was carried from launch day in November 1982. The effective radiated power (ERP) of these four analogue TV transmissions was 500 kW
- In 1997, the station began analogue transmissions of Channel 5 at an ERP of only 40 kW. The lower power was necessary to avoid co-channel interference with other transmitters sharing this frequency in the surrounding areas.
- The Oxford transmitter was included in the first 81 transmitters to carry the UK digital terrestrial television service when it was launched in the UK on 15 November 1998. Six digital multiplex signals were transmitted at low power from the station in addition to the five existing analogue television services.
- In 1999, the station began analogue transmissions of Oxford's RSL local station, The Oxford Channel, on low-power. At this time the Oxford transmitting site carried a total 12 television transmissions, six analogue services, and six digital multiplexes.
- On 28 September 2011 all the analogue television services at Oxford transmitter were switched off as part of the UK Digital Switch Over project. Three of the frequencies (uhf channels 53, 57 and 60) that had been used for the analogue service were transferred to the digital television service at high power (100 kW). The remaining three multiplex signals continued to be operated at lower power until the completion of switchover on 18 April 2012 when their power was increased to 50 kW. At the same time the highest frequency multiplex, on uhf channel 62, was moved to channel 50 as part of the UK scheme to clear the 800 MHz frequency band for use by mobile 4G services.
- In 2014 the UK telecommunications regulatory Ofcom decided that the 700 MHz band should be cleared of digital television to be used for mobile broadband services by the summer of 2020 and this would require Oxford's channels moving down the band in 2018.
- In December 2014 a low power local television multiplex was added to the site. In November 2015 the service had a soft launch as That's Oxfordshire with studios based in Abingdon.
- During 2015 two additional television multiplexes (known as Com7 and Com8) were broadcast from the Oxford site both using the DVB-T2 transmission system. This allowed a range of new channels to be broadcast to the Oxford area including the high definition versions of some of the channels only available at standard definition on the main Freeview service.
- In 2018 (between 27 Feb and 23 May) the 700 MHz clearance occurred at Oxford and as a result the frequencies of the six main Freeview digital television transmissions were moved to lower frequencies. This meant that Oxford changed from a C/D group (for the main 6 MUXES) to a K group, and, in poor signal areas, original C/D group aerials may struggle to pick up all the channels. In addition the two additional services of Com7 and Com8 were moved temporarily into the 700 MHz band pending a resolution on their future location in the UK's digital television spectrum.

=== Television coverage area ===
The coverage area provided by the digital television service is roughly the same as that provided by the analogue service. The transmitting station covers Oxfordshire, western Buckinghamshire, small parts of southwestern Northamptonshire, small parts of eastern Gloucestershire and northern parts of Berkshire and Wiltshire. This includes cities and towns such as Oxford, Milton Keynes, Banbury, Swindon, Aylesbury, Buckingham, Brackley, Didcot, Abingdon, Goring and Stow-on-the-Wold. It is sometimes called the Beckley mast, a reference to an adjacent village, or the Otmoor mast, this referring to the area on which it is located.

Oxford has 5 relay stations which are located in Chipping Norton, Charlbury, Icomb, Guiting Power, and Ascott under Wychwood.

From 2006, a new non-franchise regional news area ITV Thames Valley was provided from the ITV Meridian studios at Whiteley, Hampshire. This programme was replaced in February 2009, in a cost-saving reorganisation, by ITV Meridian's Meridian Tonight. However, Central Independent Television remained the licensee and broadcaster until 2014, when it was formally transferred to ITV Meridian.

=== Analogue radio ===
- The Oxford site started transmitting four BBC VHF/FM services (the BBC Light Programme, BBC Third Programme, BBC Home Service, Midlands, and BBC Home Service, South & West) on 28 May 1962. The transmissions were horizontally polarised as they were intended mainly for fixed rooftop aerials. With an ERP of 22 kW the transmitter covered the whole of Oxfordshire and much of the surrounding adjacent counties.
- In early 1970 the BBC Home Service South & West region transmission on 95.85 MHz was closed down in prior to the introduction of BBC Radio Oxford which launched on 29 October 1970 on 95.0 MHz. The frequency was changed to 95.2 MHz on 26 June 1973 as part of a reorganisation of local radio frequencies in and around the London area.
- On 25 November 1988 the BBC Radio 1 service was added to site to be followed by Classic FM in the mid 1990s. During the same period the FM transmitting antennas were replaced by a mixed polarised antenna better suited to providing a service to portable and car aerials. To maintain the coverage of the horizontally polarised signal the transmitter power was roughly doubled to give an ERP of 46 kW.
- On 15 September 1989 the independent local radio station Fox FM was launched on 102.6 MHz at an ERP of 9 kW. In 2005 the station became a part of GCap Media and in March 2009 the station was rebranded to Heart Oxfordshire.
- The Oxford site transmitted the AM service of Virgin Radio from its launch on 30 April 1993 on a frequency of 1197 kHz. The service is radiated from a vertical antenna which is supported by a slopping wire from the Oxford mast.

=== Digital radio ===
- When the BBC launched its Digital Radio national service on 27 December 1997 the Oxford transmitter was included in the network to provide coverage to Oxfordshire and to boost the coverage to surrounding areas. The first national commercial network, Digital One, was added to the transmitter on 23 September 1999 and a second national commercial network, Sound Digital on 29 February 2016.
- On 21 December 2012 Now Digital, a local digital radio multiplex owned and operated by Arqiva, started transmission from the Oxford site. It provides a mix of local and national radio stations to a population of some 610,000 in the city of Oxford and surrounding area.

=== May 2010 incident ===
On 13 May 2010 the digital and analogue television transmitters (except Channel 5) went off the air at about 13:20 UTC following an incident when smoke was seen drifting from the top of the mast. The fire service reported that there had been an intense fire and that the cause was unknown. Engineering work to reinstate service began once fire crews left and the mast was made safe. Transmissions were restored via the reserve transmitter at reduced power by 20:30 UTC.

The incident occurred during testing of a new main antenna which had been installed during the previous few months in readiness for the proposed digital switchover. Investigation into the cause of the fire established that it was damaged beyond repair and a replacement was installed by the end of September 2010.

== Services transmitted since June 2018 – listed by frequency ==
=== Analogue radio (AM medium wave) ===
| Frequency | kW | Service |
|---|---|---|
| 1197 kHz (off air) | 0.25 | Absolute Radio |

=== Analogue radio (FM VHF) ===
| Frequency | kW | Service |
|---|---|---|
| 89.5 MHz | 46 | BBC Radio 2 |
| 91.7 MHz | 46 | BBC Radio 3 |
| 93.9 MHz | 46 | BBC Radio 4 |
| 95.2 MHz | 5.8 | BBC Radio Oxford |
| 99.2 MHz | 46 | BBC Radio 1 |
| 101.3 MHz | 46 | Classic FM |
| 102.6 MHz | 9 | Heart South |

=== Digital radio (DAB) ===
| Frequency | Block | kW | Operator |
|---|---|---|---|
| 211.648 MHz | 10B | 5 | NOW Oxford |
| 216.928 MHz | 11A | 10 | Sound Digital |
| 222.064 MHz | 11D | 7.8 | Digital One |
| 225.648 MHz | 12B | 10 | BBC National DAB |

=== Digital television ===
| Frequency | UHF | kW | Operator | System |
|---|---|---|---|---|
| 482.000 MHz | 22 | 10 | Local 1 (That's Oxfordshire) | DVB-T |
| 538.000 MHz | 29 | 50 | SDN | DVB-T |
| 554.000 MHz | 31 | 50 | Arqiva B | DVB-T |
| 602.000 MHz | 37 | 50 | Arqiva A | DVB-T |
| 634.000 MHz | 41 | 100 | BBC A | DVB-T |
| 658.000 MHz | 44 | 100 | Digital 3&4 | DVB-T |
| 674.000 MHz | 46 | 10 | Local 2 (not yet on air) | DVB-T |
| 682.000 MHz | 47 | 100 | BBC B | DVB-T2 |
| 746.000 MHz | 55 | 16.4 | Com7 | DVB-T2 |

== Historical television transmissions listed by frequency ==
=== Analogue television ===
==== 29 January 1962 – 17 February 1968 ====
| Frequency | VHF | kW | Service |
|---|---|---|---|
| 51.75 MHz | 2 | 0.65 | BBC Television |

==== 17 February 1968 – June 1970 ====
| Frequency | VHF | UHF | kW | Service |
|---|---|---|---|---|
| 51.75 MHz | 2 | — | 0.65 | BBC1 |
| 807.25 MHz | — | 63 | 500 | BBC2 |

==== June 1970 – 2 November 1982 ====
| Frequency | VHF | UHF | kW | Service |
|---|---|---|---|---|
| 51.75 MHz | 2 | — | 0.65 | BBC1 |
| 759.25 MHz | — | 57 | 500 | BBC1 |
| 783.25 MHz | — | 60 | 500 | ATV Midlands (Central Independent Television from 1 January 1982) |
| 807.25 MHz | — | 63 | 500 | BBC2 |

==== 2 November 1982 – 3 January 1985 ====
| Frequency | VHF | UHF | kW | Service |
|---|---|---|---|---|
| 51.75 MHz | 2 | — | 0.65 | BBC1 |
| 727.25 MHz | — | 53 | 500 | Channel 4 |
| 759.25 MHz | — | 57 | 500 | BBC1 |
| 783.25 MHz | — | 60 | 500 | Central |
| 807.25 MHz | — | 63 | 500 | BBC2 |

==== 3 January 1985 – 30 March 1997 ====
405 line television ceased from this site after 23 years in service.

| Frequency | UHF | kW | Service |
|---|---|---|---|
| 727.25 MHz | 53 | 500 | Channel 4 |
| 759.25 MHz | 57 | 500 | BBC1 |
| 783.25 MHz | 60 | 500 | Central |
| 807.25 MHz | 63 | 500 | BBC2 |

==== 30 March 1997 – 15 November 1998 ====
| Frequency | UHF | kW | Service |
|---|---|---|---|
| 695.25 MHz | 49 | 40 | Channel 5 |
| 727.25 MHz | 53 | 500 | Channel 4 |
| 759.25 MHz | 57 | 500 | BBC1 |
| 783.25 MHz | 60 | 500 | Central |
| 807.25 MHz | 63 | 500 | BBC2 |

=== Analogue and digital television ===
==== 15 November 1998 – June 1999 ====
| Frequency | UHF | kW | Service | System |
|---|---|---|---|---|
| 538.000 MHz | 29 | 8 | Arqiva (Mux D) | DVB-T |
| 578.000 MHz | 34 | 10 | BBC (Mux 1) | DVB-T |
| 690.000 MHz | 48 | 8 | Arqiva (Mux C) | DVB-T |
| 695.25 MHz | 49 | 40 | Channel 5 | PAL System I |
| 713.833 MHz | 51- | 6 | SDN (Mux A) | DVB-T |
| 721.833 MHz | 52- | 6 | BBC (Mux B) | DVB-T |
| 727.25 MHz | 53 | 500 | Channel 4 | PAL System I |
| 759.25 MHz | 57 | 500 | BBC1 | PAL System I |
| 783.25 MHz | 60 | 500 | Central | PAL System I |
| 807.25 MHz | 63 | 500 | BBC2 | PAL System I |
| 850.000 MHz | 68 | 10 | Digital 3&4 (Mux 2) | DVB-T |

==== June 1999 – April 2009 ====
| Frequency | UHF | kW | Service | System |
|---|---|---|---|---|
| 538.000 MHz | 29 | 8 | Arqiva (Mux D) | DVB-T |
| 578.000 MHz | 34 | 10 | BBC (Mux 1) | DVB-T |
| 679.25 MHz | 47 | — | Six TV (The Oxford Channel until 2003) | PAL System I |
| 690.000 MHz | 48 | 8 | Arqiva (Mux C) | DVB-T |
| 695.25 MHz | 49 | 40 | Channel 5 | PAL System I |
| 713.833 MHz | 51- | 6 | SDN (Mux A) | DVB-T |
| 721.833 MHz | 52- | 6 | BBC (Mux B) | DVB-T |
| 727.25 MHz | 53 | 500 | Channel 4 | PAL System I |
| 759.25 MHz | 57 | 500 | BBC1 South | PAL System I |
| 783.25 MHz | 60 | 500 | Central | PAL System I |
| 807.25 MHz | 63 | 500 | BBC2 South | PAL System I |
| 850.000 MHz | 68 | 10 | Digital 3&4 (Mux 2) | DVB-T |

==== April 2009 – 14 September 2011 ====
| Frequency | UHF | kW | Service | System |
|---|---|---|---|---|
| 538.000 MHz | 29 | 8 | Arqiva (Mux D) | DVB-T |
| 578.000 MHz | 34 | 10 | BBC (Mux 1) | DVB-T |
| 690.000 MHz | 48 | 8 | Arqiva (Mux C) | DVB-T |
| 695.25 MHz | 49 | 40 | Channel 5 | PAL System I |
| 713.833 MHz | 51- | 6 | SDN (Mux A) | DVB-T |
| 721.833 MHz | 52- | 6 | BBC (Mux B) | DVB-T |
| 727.25 MHz | 53 | 500 | Channel 4 | PAL System I |
| 759.25 MHz | 57 | 500 | BBC1 South | PAL System I |
| 783.25 MHz | 60 | 500 | Central | PAL System I |
| 807.25 MHz | 63 | 500 | BBC2 South | PAL System I |
| 850.000 MHz | 68 | 10 | Digital 3&4 (Mux 2) | DVB-T |

==== 14 September 2011 – 28 September 2011 ====
BBC2 closed on UHF 63 on 14 September 2011. Channel 4 temporarily moved into its frequency at the time to allow BBC A to launch on UHF 53. The remaining analogue signals ceased on 28 September.

| Frequency | UHF | kW | Service | System |
|---|---|---|---|---|
| 538.000 MHz | 29 | 8 | Arqiva (Mux D) | DVB-T |
| 578.000 MHz | 34 | 8 | Arqiva (Mux C) | DVB-T |
| 695.25 MHz | 49 | 40 | Channel 5 | PAL System I |
| 713.833 MHz | 51- | 6 | SDN (Mux A) | DVB-T |
| 721.833 MHz | 52- | 6 | BBC (Mux B) | DVB-T |
| 730.166 MHz | 53+ | 100 | BBC A | DVB-T |
| 759.25 MHz | 57 | 500 | BBC One | PAL System I |
| 783.25 MHz | 60 | 500 | Meridian | PAL System I |
| 807.25 MHz | 63 | 500 | Channel 4 | PAL System I |
| 850.000 MHz | 68 | 10 | Digital 3&4 (Mux 2) | DVB-T |

=== Digital television ===
==== 28 September 2011 – 18 April 2012 ====
| Frequency | UHF | kW | Operator | System |
|---|---|---|---|---|
| 730.166 MHz | 53+ | 100 | BBC A | DVB-T |
| 746.000 MHz | 55 | 12.5 | Arqiva B | DVB-T |
| 762.000 MHz | 57 | 100 | BBC B | DVB-T2 |
| 777.833 MHz | 59- | 12.5 | Arqiva A | DVB-T |
| 785.833 MHz | 60- | 100 | Digital 3&4 | DVB-T |
| 802.000 MHz | 62 | 12.5 | SDN | DVB-T |

==== 18 April 2012 – 2015 ====
Arqiva A & B and SDN increased to 50 kW on 18 April 2012, after completion of the digital switchover at Crystal Palace transmitting station. SDN was moved to UHF 50 from UHF 62 due to the clearance of the 800 MHz Band.

| Frequency | UHF | kW | Operator | System |
|---|---|---|---|---|
| 706.000 MHz | 50 | 50 | SDN | DVB-T |
| 730.166 MHz | 53+ | 100 | BBC A | DVB-T |
| 746.000 MHz | 55 | 50 | Arqiva B | DVB-T |
| 762.000 MHz | 57 | 100 | BBC B | DVB-T2 |
| 777.833 MHz | 59- | 50 | Arqiva A | DVB-T |
| 785.833 MHz | 60- | 100 | Digital 3&4 | DVB-T |

==== 2015 – 26 February 2018 ====
| Frequency | UHF | kW | Operator | System |
|---|---|---|---|---|
| 538.000 MHz | 29 | 10 | Local | DVB-T |
| 554.000 MHz | 31 | 16.4 | Com7 | DVB-T2 |
| 602.000 MHz | 37 | 17.1 | Com8 | DVB-T2 |
| 706.000 MHz | 50 | 50 | SDN | DVB-T |
| 730.166 MHz | 53+ | 100 | BBC A | DVB-T |
| 746.000 MHz | 55 | 50 | Arqiva B | DVB-T |
| 762.000 MHz | 57 | 100 | BBC B | DVB-T2 |
| 777.833 MHz | 59- | 50 | Arqiva A | DVB-T |
| 785.833 MHz | 60- | 100 | Digital 3&4 | DVB-T |

==== 27 February 2018 to 22 May 2018 ====
On 27 February 2018, Arqiva B moved from UHF 55 to UHF 31 and COM 7 moved from UHF 31 to UHF 55, as part of the 700 MHz clearance.

| Frequency | UHF | kW | Operator | System |
|---|---|---|---|---|
| 538.000 MHz | 29 | 10 | Local | DVB-T |
| 554.000 MHz | 31 | 50 | Arqiva B | DVB-T |
| 602.000 MHz | 37 | 17.1 | COM 8 | DVB-T2 |
| 706.000 MHz | 50 | 50 | SDN | DVB-T |
| 730.166 MHz | 53+ | 100 | BBC A | DVB-T |
| 746.000 MHz | 55 | 16.4 | COM 7 | DVB-T2 |
| 762.000 MHz | 57 | 100 | BBC B | DVB-T2 |
| 777.833 MHz | 59- | 50 | Arqiva A | DVB-T |
| 785.833 MHz | 60- | 100 | Digital 3&4 | DVB-T |

==== 23 May 2018 to 24 June 2020 ====
On 23 May 2018, the following services moved to new frequencies, as part of the 700 MHz clearance:

- Local Multiplex moved from UHF 29 to UHF 22 (with an additional beam on UHF 46).
- SDN moved from UHF 50 to UHF 29.
- Arqiva A moved from UHF 59- to UHF 37.
- BBC A moved from UHF 53+ to UHF 41.
- Digital 3&4 moved from UHF 60- to UHF 44.
- BBC B moved from UHF 57 to UHF 47.
- COM 8 moved from UHF 37 to UHF 56.

| Frequency | UHF | kW | Operator | System |
|---|---|---|---|---|
| 482.000 MHz | 22 | 10 | Local | DVB-T |
| 538.000 MHz | 29 | 50 | SDN | DVB-T |
| 554.000 MHz | 31 | 50 | Arqiva B | DVB-T |
| 602.000 MHz | 37 | 50 | Arqiva A | DVB-T |
| 634.000 MHz | 41 | 100 | BBC A | DVB-T |
| 658.000 MHz | 44 | 100 | Digital 3&4 | DVB-T |
| 674.000 MHz | 46 | 10 | Local | DVB-T |
| 682.000 MHz | 47 | 100 | BBC B | DVB-T2 |
| 746.000 MHz | 55 | 16.4 | COM 7 | DVB-T2 |
| 754.000 MHz | 56 | 17.1 | COM 8 | DVB-T2 |

==== 25 June 2020 to present ====
On 25 June 2020, COM8 was permanently switched off from Oxford, due to the effects of the 700 MHz clearance programme.

| Frequency | UHF | kW | Operator | System |
|---|---|---|---|---|
| 482.000 MHz | 22 | 10 | Local 1 (That's Oxfordshire) | DVB-T |
| 538.000 MHz | 29 | 50 | SDN | DVB-T |
| 554.000 MHz | 31 | 50 | Arqiva B | DVB-T |
| 602.000 MHz | 37 | 50 | Arqiva A | DVB-T |
| 634.000 MHz | 41 | 100 | BBC A | DVB-T |
| 658.000 MHz | 44 | 100 | Digital 3&4 | DVB-T |
| 682.000 MHz | 47 | 100 | BBC B | DVB-T2 |
| 746.000 MHz | 55 | 16.4 | COM 7 | DVB-T2 |

== See also ==
- List of masts
- List of tallest buildings and structures in the United Kingdom
- List of radio stations in the United Kingdom
