= Midhurst transmitting station =

Radio and TV transmission site in West Sussex, England

Midhurst
- Location in West Sussex
- Mast height: 117.7 metres (386 ft)
- Coordinates: 51.017222°N 0.701111°W
- Grid reference: SU912250
- Built: 1972
- BBC region: BBC South
- ITV region: ITV Meridian (South)

The Midhurst transmitting station is a facility for both analogue and digital VHF/FM radio and UHF television transmission, 3.1 miles (5.0 km) northeast of Midhurst, West Sussex, England. The station broadcasts to much of the northern half of West Sussex, and to small parts of Surrey and Hampshire. This includes towns such as Horsham, Midhurst, Haslemere, Godalming, Petersfield, Steyning, and Bordon.

It includes a guyed steel lattice mast, and on top of this is the UHF television transmitting antenna, which brings the overall height of the structure to 117.7 metres (386 ft).

The transmission site is located at 51° 01' 2.0″ North, 0° 42' 4.0" West (National Grid Reference: SU912250).

The current mast has an average height of 307 metres above sea level. It is now owned and operated by Arqiva, but was owned by the BBC before they privatised their transmission department prior to 1997.

== Services listed by frequency ==
=== Analogue radio (FM VHF) ===
Frequency	kW	Service
106.6 MHz	0.4	Greatest Hits Radio West Sussex

=== Digital radio (DAB) ===
Frequency	Block	kW	Operator
222.064 MHz	11D	1.0	Digital One
225.648 MHz	12B	6.3	BBC National DAB

=== Television ===
==== Analogue ====
===== 1972 – 1983 =====
Frequency	UHF	kW	Service
743.25 MHz	55	100	BBC2 South
767.25 MHz	58	100	Southern (TVS from Jan 1982)
791.25 MHz	61	100	BBC1 South

===== 1983 – 31 December 1992 =====
Frequency	UHF	kW	Service
743.25 MHz	55	100	BBC2 South
767.25 MHz	58	100	TVS
791.25 MHz	61	100	BBC1 South
847.25 MHz	68	100	Channel 4

===== 1 January 1993 – 14 November 1998 =====
Frequency	UHF	kW	Service
743.25 MHz	55	100	BBC2 South
767.25 MHz	58	100	Meridian
791.25 MHz	61	100	BBC1 South
847.25 MHz	68	100	Channel 4

==== Analogue and digital ====
===== 15 November 1998 – 28 February 2012 =====
Digital terrestrial television was first transmitted from the Midhurst mast from 15 November 1998 using the frequency gaps between the analogue TV broadcasts. To limit interference to the analogue transmissions, power output on the digital multiplexes was low.

Frequency	UHF	kW	Operator	System
743.25 MHz	55	100	BBC2 South	PAL System I
754.166 MHz	56+	2	BBC (Mux 1)	DVB-T
767.25 MHz	58	100	Meridian	PAL System I
778.166 MHz	59+	2	BBC (Mux B)	DVB-T
786.000 MHz	60	1	Arqiva (Mux D)	DVB-T
791.25 MHz	61	100	BBC1 South	PAL System I
802.166 MHz	62+	2	SDN (Mux A)	DVB-T
817.833 MHz	64-	1	Arqiva (Mux C)	DVB-T
826.166 MHz	65+	2	Digital 3&4 (Mux 2)	DVB-T
847.25 MHz	68	100	Channel 4	PAL System I

===== 29 February 2012 to 13 March 2012 =====
On 29 February 2012, Midhurst started DSO with analogue BBC2 ceasing transmission on UHF 55 and Mux 1 closed on UHF 56. The new BBC A multiplex started on UHF 55 from the start.

Frequency	UHF	kW	Operator	System
746.000 MHz	55	20	BBC A	DVB-T
767.25 MHz	58	100	Meridian	PAL System I
778.166 MHz	59+	2	BBC (Mux B)	DVB-T
786.000 MHz	60	1	Arqiva (Mux D)	DVB-T
791.25 MHz	61	100	BBC1 South	PAL System I
802.166 MHz	62+	2	SDN (Mux A)	DVB-T
817.833 MHz	64-	1	Arqiva (Mux C)	DVB-T
826.166 MHz	65+	2	Digital 3&4 (Mux 2)	DVB-T
847.25 MHz	68	100	Channel 4	PAL System I

==== Digital ====
===== 14 March 2012 to 2 October 2012 =====
Following the completion of analogue TV shutdown on 14 March 2012, Midhurst frequency allocation was.

Frequency	UHF	kW	Operator	System
706.000 MHz	50	10 (1 kW until 25 April 2012)	Arqiva B	DVB-T
746.000 MHz	55	20	BBC A	DVB-T
770.000 MHz	58	20	BBC B	DVB-T2
778.000 MHz	59	10	Arqiva A	DVB-T
794.000 MHz	61	20	Digital 3&4	DVB-T
802.000 MHz	62	10	SDN	DVB-T

===== 3 October 2012 to 20 March 2018 =====
Due to the clearance of the 800 MHz band, Digital 3&4 was moved from UHF 61 to UHF 56 and SDN from UHF 62 to UHF 54.

Frequency	UHF	kW	Operator	System
706.000 MHz	50	10	Arqiva B	DVB-T
738.000 MHz	54	10	SDN	DVB-T
746.000 MHz	55	20	BBC A	DVB-T
754.000 MHz	56	20	Digital 3&4	DVB-T
770.000 MHz	58	20	BBC B	DVB-T2
778.000 MHz	59	10	Arqiva A	DVB-T

===== 21 March 2018 to 15 October 2019 =====
Due to the clearance of the 700 MHz band, SDN was moved from UHF 54 to UHF 29, this allowed Digital 3&4 to move from UHF 56 to UHF 54 (this was a "Transitional" frequency for 700MHZ clearance purposes), BBC A from UHF 55 to UHF 48 and Arqiva B from UHF 50 to UHF 33.

Frequency	UHF	kW	Operator	System
538.000 MHz	29	10	SDN	DVB-T
570.000 MHz	33	10	Arqiva B	DVB-T
690.000 MHz	48	20	BBC A	DVB-T
738.000 MHz	54	20	Digital 3&4	DVB-T
770.000 MHz	58	20	BBC B	DVB-T2
778.000 MHz	59	10	Arqiva A	DVB-T

===== 16 October 2019 to present =====
Midhurst completed 700 MHz clearance on 16 October 2019 when the following frequencies came into use.

Frequency	UHF	kW	Operator	System
538.000 MHz	29	10	SDN	DVB-T
570.000 MHz	33	10	Arqiva B	DVB-T
578.000 MHz	34	10	Arqiva A	DVB-T
586.000 MHz	35	20	Digital 3&4	DVB-T
594.000 MHz	36	20	BBC B	DVB-T2
690.000 MHz	48	20	BBC A	DVB-T

== See also ==
- List of masts
- List of tallest structures in the United Kingdom
- List of radio stations in the United Kingdom
