= Torosay transmitting station =

Broadcasting and telecommunications facility in Scotland

Torosay
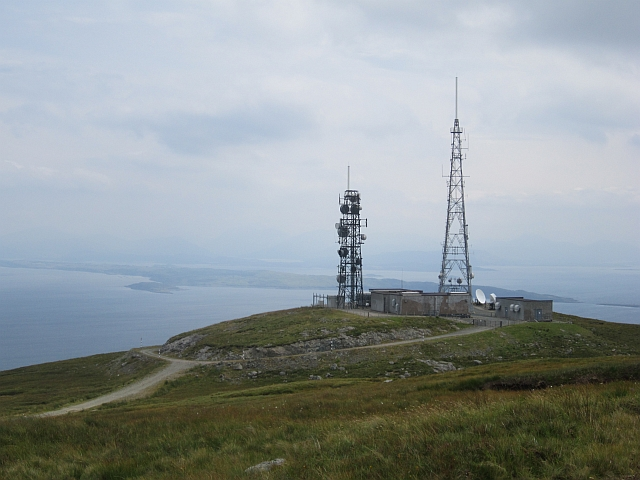

- Location within Mull
- Mast height: 45 metres (148 ft)
- Coordinates: 56.458°N 5.730°W
- Grid reference: ND19783854
- Built: 1976
- BBC region: BBC Scotland
- ITV region: STV Central

The Torosay transmitting station is a television broadcasting facility on the Isle of Mull, in Argyll and Bute, Scotland (grid reference ND197385). It is owned and operated by Arqiva.

It is located in the parish of Torosay in the foothills of Dùn da Ghaoithe, the second highest mountain in Mull. Although the mountain reaches 2,513 feet (766 m), the transmitter is at 1,401 feet (427 m).

== Coverage ==
Torosay provides television signals to areas around Loch Linnhe and the Sound of Mull including Oban, Fort William, Lochaline, and to both Craignure and Tobermory on the Isle of Mull.

Torosay is part of the STV Central TV region.

It entered into service on 11 June 1976.

== Current broadcasting ==
=== Television ===
As of 2023, Torosay broadcasts Digital Terrestrial Television on the following UHF frequencies

Frequency	UHF	kW	Multiplex	System
482.000 MHz	22	4	BBC B	DVB-T2
490.000 MHz	23	4	SDN	DVB-T
506.000 MHz	25	4	Digital 3&4	DVB-T
514.000 MHz	26	4	Arqiva A	DVB-T
530.000 MHz	28	4	BBC A	DVB-T
546.000 MHz	30	4	Arqiva B	DVB-T

== Relays ==
Due to the local geography, Torosay provides a source for 21 relay transmitters.

Analogue Television:

Frequency	UHF	kW	Service
479.25 MHz	22	20	BBC One Scotland
503.25 MHz	25	20	STV (Central)
527.25 MHz	28	20	BBC Two Scotland
559.25 MHz	32	20	Channel 4
