= Darvel transmitting station =

Darvel
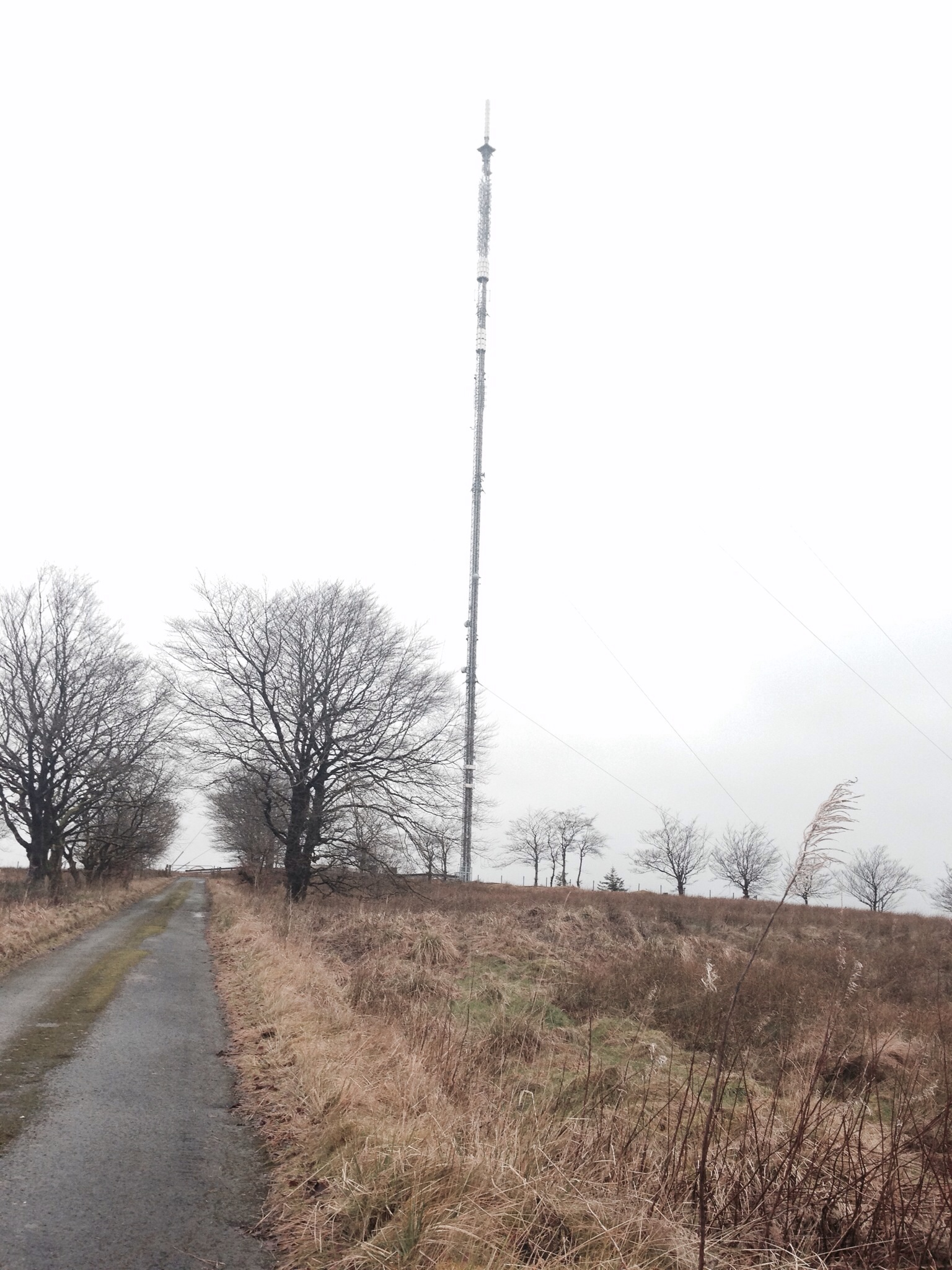

- Location within East Ayrshire
- Location: Darvel, East Ayrshire
- Mast height: 152.4 metres (500 ft)
- Coordinates: 55.579430°N 4.289775°W
- Grid reference: NS5567234132
- BBC region: BBC Scotland
- ITV region: STV Central

Darvel transmitting station is a broadcasting and telecommunications facility located near Darvel, East Ayrshire, Scotland (grid reference NS5567234132). The site is owned by Arqiva.

The transmitter carries analogue and digital radio stations, as well as digital television. Darvel previously carried analogue television until the digital switchover which took place during May 2011. The television services from Darvel require an A group aerial.

== Services from the transmitter ==
=== Analogue radio (VHF FM) ===
Frequency	kW	Service
89.5 MHz	5	BBC Radio 2
91.7 MHz	5	BBC Radio 3
93.9 MHz	5	BBC Radio Scotland
96.7 MHz	1.1	West FM
99.1 MHz	5	BBC Radio 1
101.3 MHz	4	Classic FM
104.3 MHz	5	BBC Radio 4

=== Digital radio (DAB) ===
Frequency	Block	kW	Operator
218.640 MHz	11B	0.76	Arqiva Ayr
220.352 MHz	11C	1	Bauer Glasgow
222.064 MHz	11D	0.5	Switch Scotland
223.936 MHz	12A	7	Digital One
225.648 MHz	12B	10	BBC National DAB

=== Analogue television ===
All analog TV ceased from the Darvel transmitter on 25 May 2011. BBC Two Scotland was switched off on 11 May 2011.

Frequency	UHF	kW	Service
487.25 MHz	23	100	STV (Central)
511.25 MHz	26	100	BBC Two Scotland
535.25 MHz	29	100	Channel 4
567.25 MHz	33	100	BBC One Scotland
583.25 MHz	35	100	Channel 5

=== Digital television ===
Frequency	UHF	kW	Operator	System
481.833 MHz	22	20	PSB1 (BBC A)	DVB-T
506.000 MHz	25	20	PSB2 (Digital 3&4)	DVB-T
530.000 MHz	28	20	PSB3 (BBC B)	DVB-T2
554.000 MHz	31	1	Local TV	DVB-T
562.000 MHz	32	10	COM4 (SDN)	DVB-T
578.000 MHz	34	10	COM5 (Arqiva A)	DVB-T
586.000 MHz	35	10	COM6 (Arqiva B)	DVB-T
746.000 MHz	55	7.5	COM7 (Arqiva C)	DVB-T2

==== Before switchover ====
Frequency	UHF	kW	Operator	System
481.833 MHz	22-	4	BBC (Mux 1)	DVB-T
505.833 MHz	25-	4	Digital 3&4 (Mux 2)	DVB-T
529.833 MHz	28-	4	BBC (Mux B)	DVB-T
546.166 MHz	30+	2	Arqiva A (Mux C)	DVB-T
561.833 MHz	32-	4	SDN (Mux A)	DVB-T
578.000 MHz	34	2	Arqiva (Mux D)	DVB-T
