= 93.2 FM =

FM radio frequency

The following radio stations broadcast on FM frequency 93.2 MHz:

== China ==
- CNR Business Radio in Huaihua
- CNR Radio The Greater Bay in Foshan
- CNR The Voice of China in Tangshan
- GRT News Radio in Yangjiang

== Indonesia ==
- Hot 93.2 FM in Jakarta

== Sri Lanka ==
- Gold FM

== Turkey ==
- Radyo 3 in Niğde

== United Kingdom ==
- BBC Radio Guernsey (Les Touillets)
- BBC Radio 4 (Ballycastle, Carnmoney Hill, Chippenham, Crystal Palace, Isles of Scilly, Penaligon Downs)
- BBC Radio Cymru (Ton Pentre)
- BBC Radio Scotland (Strachur)
- BCfm in Bristol
- Sheffield Live in Sheffield
