= Arqiva =

British telecommunications and broadcast infrastructure company

- Type: Private
- Industry: Telecommunications
- Founded: 2005
- Headquarters: Crawley, Hampshire, England, UK
- Services: Transmissions
- Owner: Digital 9 Infrastructure (48%); Macquarie Group (25%); IFM Investors (14.8%)
- Website: www.arqiva.com

Arqiva (/ɑːrˈkiːvə/) is a British telecommunications company which provides infrastructure, broadcast transmission and smart meter facilities in the United Kingdom. The company is headquartered at the former Independent Broadcasting Authority headquarters in Crawley, Hampshire, England. Its main customers are broadcasters and utility companies, and its main asset is a network of around 1,500 radio and television transmission sites. It is owned by a consortium of investors led by Digital 9 Infrastructure and the Australian investment house Macquarie Bank. Arqiva is a patron of the Radio Academy.

Through its Now Digital subsidiary, it operates various local digital radio ensembles.

== History ==
Arqiva has a history that dates back to the beginning of regular public broadcasting in the United Kingdom. Arqiva Limited, a private limited company, was incorporated on 2 April 1990. In January 2001, it was announced that John Cresswell would head Arqiva. Below is a potted history of the various organisations that are now part of Arqiva:

=== BBC ===
Responsibility for the transmitter assets of the BBC lay solely within the corporation from its foundation in 1922 until 1997. The assets were then split into a separate company, prior to being sold.

The domestic transmitter network was purchased by a US company, Crown Castle, when it was privatised in 1997. Subsequently, in 2004, this was purchased by National Grid plc, which merged in its own private communication network, the name changing to National Grid Wireless in October 2005. Transmitters used by the BBC overseas services were sold to a new startup company, called Merlin Communications.

=== National Grid ===
National Grid plc had a large internal network for the communication of its engineers serving initially the electricity companies, but subsequently, the gas industry as well. This company developed on the back of the growth in mobile phones, and its large portfolio of tower locations. This was added to by the purchase of the former BBC network (as above).

National Grid Wireless, as it became, led a consortium bidding for the second UK national DAB multiplex licence, but was unsuccessful. The licence was awarded instead to 4 Digital Group in July 2007.

=== Independent Television Authority (ITA) / Independent Broadcasting Authority (IBA) ===
The Television Act 1954 gave birth to the Independent Television Authority (ITA). The ITA appointed and regulated a number of regional programme contractors, and built and operated a network of transmitters.

The Sound Broadcasting Act 1972 created legal commercial radio in the UK for the first time. It was modelled on ITA, in that programmes were made by local contractors while the regulator, renamed the Independent Broadcasting Authority, owned and operated the transmitters.

=== ITC, Ofcom, Radio Authority and Transcom ===
The Broadcasting Act 1990 split the IBA into three bodies. The Independent Television Commission (ITC) regulated commercial TV and the Radio Authority (RA) regulated commercial radio. The IBA's engineering division, which operated the transmitters as well as doing research and development, became an independent company called National Transcommunications Limited (NTL), also known as "Transcom". At this point, technical standards regulation, previously carried out in accordance with the IBA engineering "Code of Practice", seems to have disappeared from the regulatory landscape.

=== CableTel, Simoco, NTL ===
Transcom was acquired by International CableTel, which subsequently built its brand around the NTL name. It ran up huge debts during the dot-com boom which crippled the company for many years. In 1998, NTL acquired the UK antenna sites business of Simoco, a private mobile radio (PMR) company formed from Philips Telecom – PMR. In 1999 NTL acquired the UK field service operations business of Simoco. In 2004, NTL sold its 'broadcast unit' to Macquarie Communications Infrastructure Group, but continued as a cable operator.

=== Macquarie ===
In January 2005, Macquarie Communications Infrastructure Group renamed its new subsidiary Arqiva. Subsequently in July 2009, Macquarie sold off a substantial part of its holding and moved the remaining amount to its investment fund. Canada Pension Plan Investment Board (CPPIB) now has a 48% holding and Macquarie European Infrastructure Fund 2 (MEIF 2) has 21%, with other Macquarie Group funds holding 13%

=== Inmedia ===
Arqiva acquired Inmedia Communications from the Carlyle Group for £68.5 million in July 2005 to form the new Satellite Media Solutions business unit. Inmedia was owned by Kingston Communications and known as Kingston inmedia before being bought by the Carlyle Group in 2004.

=== BT Broadcast ===
Arqiva announced the signing of a sale and purchase agreement (SPA) with BT to acquire the full-time service components of BT's Satellite Broadcast Services business for £25 million in cash in November 2006. The deal will include long-term customer contracts, operations and personnel located in the United States, France, Italy and the Netherlands, as well as the UK. Deal completion is subject to regulatory approval in the UK and Germany.

=== National Grid Wireless ===
Arqiva purchased National Grid Wireless on 3 April 2007 for £2.5 billion. The company planned to run NGW as a separate company – Macquarie UK Broadcast Ventures Ltd – pending review of the deal by competition regulators. Regulatory agreement was reached in late 2008 and National Grid Wireless was amalgamated into Arqiva. The new company employs around 775 people and operates all the TV and most of the radio transmitters in the UK (BBC national and local and many commercial stations). It is deemed to be a monopoly operator and as such is regulated by Ofcom.

=== JFMG ===
Arqiva purchased PMSE band manager JFMG 19 February 2009. JFMG were contracted by communications regulator Ofcom to provide spectrum management and licensing services for programme making and special events (PSME). In May 2015 Ofcom made the decision to end the contract with Arqiva and to insource the existing services.

== Recent activity ==
=== OneVision DTT Licence application ===
During 2009, Arqiva were involved in the possibility of provision of digital pay TV in Ireland.

=== Digital radio ===
In 2009, Arqiva bought Global Media & Entertainment's DAB multiplexes: the Digital One national broadcast and the Now Digital network of local multiplexes operating in England and Wales. It also part-owns the Sound Digital national multiplex alongside Bauer Media Audio UK and News Broadcasting.

=== SeeSaw ===
In March 2010, Arqiva invested in and launched a catch-up Internet television, IPTV service called SeeSaw. Subsequently the holding in the company was reduced to 25%.

=== WiFi ===
In July 2012, Arqiva bought Spectrum Interactive, a wholesale only WiFi provider.

In 2016, Arqiva sold its WiFi business to Virgin Media.

=== Sale of telecommunications business ===
In October 2019, the company sold its telecommunication business to Cellnex.

== Change of ownership ==
In June 2022, Digital 9 Infrastructure acquired a 48% stake in Arqiva from the Canada Pension Plan.

== Transmitter sites ==
Arqiva state that they broadcast radio and television from 1,450 sites. These include:

- Alexandra Palace (51°35′40″N 0°7′45″W)
- Angus (56°33′18″N 2°59′10″W)
- Arfon (53°1′11″N 4°16′24″W)
- Ashkirk (55°30′39″N 2°50′26″W)
- Ashton Moss (53°28′59″N 2°7′43″W & 53°29′28″N 2°6′55″W)
- Beacon Hill (50°26′47″N 3°36′39″W & 50°26′49″N 3°36′37″W)
- Belmont (53°20′9″N 0°10′19″W)
- Black Hill
- Black Mountain
- Bilsdale West Moor
- Blaenplwyf (52°21′38″N 4°6′10″W)
- Bluebell Hill (51°19′27″N 0°31′14″E)
- Bressay
- Brookmans Park
- Brougher Mountain (54°25′24″N 7°27′45″W)
- Burghead
- Burnhope
- Caldbeck
- Caradon Hill
- Carmel (51°49′6.5″N 4°3′58″W)
- Chatton (55°31′55″N 1°50′3″W)
- Chillerton Down
- Clevedon (51°25′24″N 2°51′52″W)
- Craigkelly
- Croydon
- Crystal Palace (54°49′19″N 1°42′53″W)
- Darvel (55°34′46″N 4°17′23″W)
- Daventry
- Divis
- Douglas (54°8′26″N 4°29′35″W)
- Dover
- Droitwich
- Durris (56°59′59″N 2°23′30″W)
- Eitshal (58°10′45″N 6°35′6″W)
- Emley Moor (53°36′44″N 1°39′52″W)
- Forfar (56°33′27″N 2°50′37″W)
- Fort William (56°50′54″N 5°5′19″W)
- Frémont Point
- Hannington (51°18′28.5″N 1°14′41″W)
- Haverfordwest
- Heathfield
- Holme Moss (53°32′00″N 1°51′29″W)
- Huntshaw Cross (50°58′45″N 4°5′56″W)
- Isles of Scilly
- Keelylang Hill (58°58′31″N 3°5′2″W)
- Kilvey Hill (51°37′45″N 3°55′13″W)
- Kirk o'Shotts
- Knock More (57°31′57″N 3°8′6″W)
- Les Platons (49°14′46″N 2°6′5″W)
- Lichfield (52°38′12″N 1°45′32″W)
- Limavady (55°6′33″N 6°53′11″W)
- Lisnagarvey
- Llanddona
- Llangollen (53°1′52″N 3°10′50″W)
- Londonderry (55°0′15″N 7°22′8″W)
- Manningtree (51°55′26″N 1°5′10″E)
- Meldrum (57°23′13″N 2°24′0″W)
- Melvaig
- Membury
- Mendip
- Mendlesham
- Midhurst (51°1′1″N 0°42′3″W)
- Moel-y-Parc
- Moorside Edge (53°38′05″N 1°53′37″W)
- Mounteagle
- North Hessary Tor (50°33′1″N 4°0′30″W)
- Oban (56°24′15″N 5°29′9″W)
- Oxford (51°47′26″N 1°10′44″W)
- Peterborough
- Pontop Pike
- Preseli
- Redruth
- Ridge Hill
- Rosemarkie (57°38′0″N 4°4′31″W)
- Rowridge
- Rumster Forest
- Sandale
- Sandy Heath
- Selkirk
- Skriaig (57°23′12″N 6°14′33″W)
- Staddon Heights
- Stagshaw (55°1′58″N 2°1′23″W)
- St. Hilary (51°27′27″N 3°24′11″W)
- St Thomas
- Start Point
- Stockland Hill
- Strabane
- Sudbury
- Sutton Coldfield (52°36′2″N 1°50′2″W)
- Swingate
- Tacolneston
- Tapton Hill/Sheffield (Crosspool)
- Thrumster (58°23′38″N 3°7′28″W)
- Torosay (56°27′30″N 5°43′46″W)
- Waltham
- Washford (51°9′41″N 3°20′53″W)
- Wenvoe
- Westerglen
- West Kirby
- Winter Hill (53°37′32″N 2°30′51″W)
- The Wrekin
- Wrotham
- Zouches Farm

== See also ==
- Digital One (A joint venture with GCap Media providing UK DAB - wholly owned by Arqiva since 11 February 2008)
- 2RN in Ireland
- Freeview
- VT Communications (Formerly Merlin Communications, formed from privatisation of BBC World Service transmitter sites.)

== Sources ==
- Pawley, Edward (1972). BBC Engineering 1922–1972. London, BBC. ISBN 0-563-12127-0
- Shacklady, Norman and Ellen, Martin (2003). On Air: A History of BBC Transmission. Wavechange Books. ISBN 0-9544077-1-7 (paperback) ISBN 0-9544077-0-9 (hardback).
