= Mendip transmitting station =

Broadcasting and telecommunications facility

Mendip
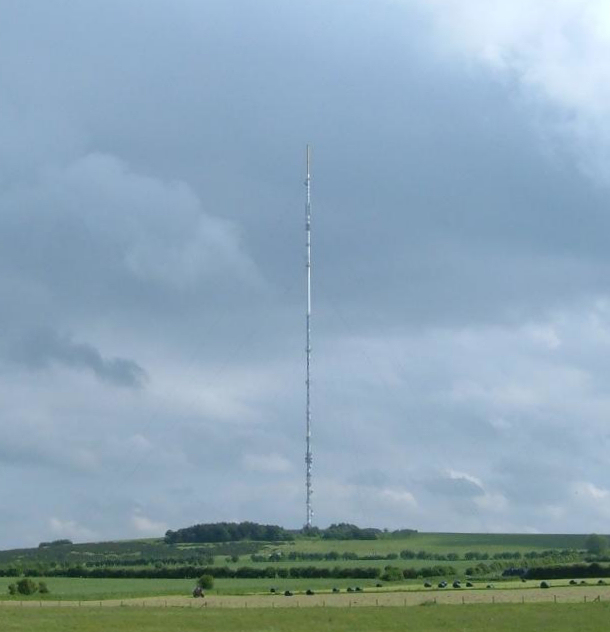
- The Mendip UHF television mast

- Location within Somerset
- Mast height: 293 m (961 ft)
- Coordinates: 51.2370°N 2.6253°W
- Grid reference: ST564488
- Built: 1967
- BBC region: BBC West
- ITV region: ITV West Country; (formerly ITV West)
- Local TV service: Local TV Bristol

The Mendip transmitting station is a broadcasting and telecommunications facility on the summit of Pen Hill, part of the Mendip Hills range in Somerset, England, at 305 metres (1,001 ft) above sea level. The station is in St Cuthbert Out civil parish, approximately 2 miles (3.2 km) north-east of Wells. Its mast, 293 m (961 ft) high, was built in 1967 and is the tallest structure in South West England. The mast broadcasts digital television, FM analogue radio and DAB digital radio, and had broadcast analogue colour television from 1967 until 2010.

== Description ==
The station is owned and operated by Arqiva (which acquired National Grid Wireless, previously Crown Castle).

Until 2008 a glass-reinforced plastic aerial cylinder, containing the analogue television transmitting antennas, was mounted at the top of the mast, bringing the total height of the structure to 305 metres (1,001 ft). With a mean height of 596 metres (1,955 ft) above sea level, these antennas were among the highest in the UK. They were removed in 2010, the antenna cylinder being replaced with a new antenna assembly, ready for digital switchover later that year. The present assembly is slightly shorter than the previous cylinder, causing the overall mast height to be reduced from 305 metres (1,001 ft) to 293 metres (961 ft).

There are red aircraft warning lamps (six sets of two lights) on the mast, and two lights on top. The mast can be seen from as far away as Puriton during the day, and the aircraft warning lights make it visible at night from most of the Somerset Levels and from areas of South Wales, such as the high ground near the Wenvoe transmitting station.

== Television ==
Mendip was configured as a C/D group transmitter when it entered service with analogue PAL transmissions. In July 2007, Ofcom confirmed that it would remain a C/D group transmitter at digital switchover. The mast broadcasts digital television over a large area of the west of England, including Somerset, Wiltshire, Bristol, southern Gloucestershire, and northern Dorset. Northern Gloucestershire – such as most of Cheltenham and Tewkesbury – is outside the coverage area, instead receiving signals from Ridge Hill transmitting station in Herefordshire.

Cardiff and other parts of southeast Wales were also able to receive the analogue TV transmissions from Mendip, and many households used it in preference to the more local Wenvoe transmitter which carries the Wales variations of BBC One, BBC Two, and ITV. This was originally because the Wenvoe transmitter broadcast S4C (with programmes in Welsh and some prime-time English programmes from Channel 4 scheduled at much later times) rather than Channel 4 itself. Even after digital switchover when transmitters in Wales also began to broadcast Channel 4 in addition to S4C, some households continued with their preference for the West variations of BBC One, BBC Two, and ITV, and having Channel 4 (not S4C) as number 4 on the electronic programme guide.

Power on analogue transmissions was 500 kW (ERP) for BBC 1, BBC2, HTV West, Channel 4, and 126 kW (ERP) for Channel 5. The latter was transmitted outside of the original C/D grouping of the transmitter but most homes in reasonable signal areas for the C/D group could receive it with their C/D group aerial. All six digital multiplexes were transmitted at 10 kW until switchover in 2010 when the power on the "BBC A", "BBC B/HD" and "D3&4" multiplexes was boosted to 100 kW. In 2011, SDN was boosted to 50 kW and in 2012 the remaining two Arqiva multiplexes were boosted to 50 kW too.

In June 2019, as part of the 700MHz clearance programme, Mendip became K group (excluding muxes 7 and 8, which are due to be switched off between 2020 and 2022). This means that homes in poor signal areas which still have a C/D group aerial may have difficulty in receiving all multiplexes.

Mendip's population coverage is around 1.5 million, although some homes in the immediate vicinity, such as those in Cheddar, are unable to receive a signal due to being in the shadow of the Mendip Hills and therefore depend on local relays.

== Radio ==
Mendip broadcasts FM (analogue VHF) radio for BBC Radio Somerset and the Severn Estuary regional service Hits Radio. Mendip also transmits high power Digital Audio Broadcasting (DAB) signals for the Digital One, Sound Digital and BBC National DAB multiplexes. An additional DAB multiplex, MuxCo Somerset, was awarded a licence in 2008 to broadcast local and national services to Somerset, and began transmission in 2014. After the closure of the Severn Estuary digital radio multiplex, the equipment from Mendip was reused to improve coverage on the Welsh coastline for the Cardiff & Newport, now South East Wales, multiplex.

== Output ==
=== Radio ===
==== Analogue ====
Frequency	kW	Service	Notes
95.5 MHz	5	BBC Radio Somerset	
101.0 MHz	40	Hits Radio	Directional antenna towards South Wales
102.6 MHz	4	Heart West	

==== Digital ====
Frequency	Block	kW	Operator	Notes
211.648 MHz	10B	1.2	MuxCo Somerset	
216.928 MHz	11A		Sound Digital Limited	
222.064 MHz	11D	5	Digital One	
225.648 MHz	12B	5	BBC National DAB	
227.360 MHz	12C	1.5	South East Wales	For improved coverage on the Welsh coastline

=== Television ===
==== Analogue ====
===== 1 December 1969 – 11 May 1970 =====
Frequency	UHF	kW	Service
815.25 MHz	64	500	BBC2 West

===== 11 May 1970 – 30 May 1970 =====
Frequency	UHF	kW	Service
767.25 MHz	58	500	BBC1 West
815.25 MHz	64	500	BBC2 West

===== 30 May 1970 – 2 November 1982 =====
HTV was launched from Mendip on channel 61 on 30 May 1970

Frequency	UHF	kW	Service
767.25 MHz	58	500	BBC1 West
791.25 MHz	61	500	HTV West
815.25 MHz	64	500	BBC2 West

===== 2 November 1982 – 30 March 1997 =====
Channel 4 was launched.

Frequency	UHF	kW	Service
735.25 MHz	54	500	Channel 4
767.25 MHz	58	500	BBC1 West
791.25 MHz	61	500	HTV West
815.25 MHz	64	500	BBC2 West

===== 30 March 1997 – 15 November 1998 =====
Even though the engineering plan was only for four TV channels, a fifth one was launched in 1997. C5 was launched in 1997 on Channel 37 at 126 KW.

Frequency	UHF	kW	Service
599.25 MHz	37	126	Channel 5
735.25 MHz	54	500	Channel 4
767.25 MHz	58	500	BBC1 West
791.25 MHz	61	500	HTV West
815.25 MHz	64	500	BBC2 West

==== Analogue and digital ====
===== 15 November 1998 – 24 March 2010 =====
Digital terrestrial television was first transmitted from the Mendip mast from 15 November 1998 using the frequency gaps between the analogue TV broadcasts. To limit interference to the analogue transmissions, power output on the digital multiplexes was low.

Frequency	UHF	kW	Operator	System
599.25 MHz	37	126	Channel 5	PAL System I
735.25 MHz	54	500	Channel 4	PAL System I
746.166 MHz	55+	10	Digital 3&4 (Mux 2)	DVB-T
754.166 MHz	56+	10	Arqiva (Mux C)	DVB-T
767.25 MHz	58	500	BBC1 West	PAL System I
778.166 MHz	59+	10	BBC (Mux 1)	DVB-T
791.25 MHz	61	500	HTV West	PAL System I
802.166 MHz	62+	10	SDN (Mux A)	DVB-T
815.25 MHz	64	500	BBC2 West	PAL System I
826.166 MHz	65+	10	BBC (Mux B)	DVB-T
842.000 MHz	67	10	Arqiva (Mux D)	DVB-T

===== 24 March 2010 – 7 April 2010 =====
On 24 March 2010 BBC2 was switched off on UHF 64 and HTV West was switched from UHF 61 for its final weeks of service. Multiplex 1 on UHF 59+ was closed and replaced by BBC A on UHF 61 (which had just been vacated by analogue HTV West). BBC A was transmitted at full power (100 kW) and in 64QAM, 8k carriers mode from the start.

Frequency	UHF	kW	Operator	System
599.25 MHz	37	126	Channel 5	PAL System I
735.25 MHz	54	500	Channel 4	PAL System I
746.166 MHz	55+	10	Digital 3&4 (Mux 2)	DVB-T
754.166 MHz	56+	10	Arqiva (Mux C)	DVB-T
767.25 MHz	58	500	BBC1 West	PAL System I
794.000 MHz	61	100	BBC A	DVB-T
802.166 MHz	62+	10	SDN (Mux A)	DVB-T
815.25 MHz	64	500	HTV West	PAL System I
826.166 MHz	65+	10	BBC (Mux B)	DVB-T
842.000 MHz	67	10	Arqiva (Mux D)	DVB-T

==== Digital ====
===== 7 April 2010 – 28 September 2011 =====
Following the completion of analogue TV shutdown on 7 April 2010, Mendip transmitted all of its higher powered multiplexes at 100 kW. From this date until the second-stage switchover of 28 September 2011 the frequency allocation was:

Frequency	UHF	kW	Operator	System
738.000 MHz	54	100	Digital 3&4	DVB-T
754.166 MHz	56+	10	Arqiva A	DVB-T
770.000 MHz	58	100	BBC B	DVB-T2
794.000 MHz	61	100	BBC A	DVB-T
802.166 MHz	62+	10	SDN	DVB-T
842.000 MHz	67	26	Arqiva B	DVB-T

===== 28 September 2011 – 28 March 2012 =====
With the completion of digital switchover at Oxford, all multiplexes could be moved to their final channel allocations with the exception of Arqiva A. SDN increased to half its full power output (50 kW).

Frequency	UHF	kW	Operator	System
690.000 MHz	48	50	SDN	DVB-T
722.000 MHz	52	25.7	Arqiva B	DVB-T
738.000 MHz	54	100	Digital 3&4	DVB-T
770.000 MHz	58	100	BBC B	DVB-T2
794.000 MHz	61	100	BBC A	DVB-T
842.000 MHz	67	26	Arqiva A	DVB-T

===== 28 March 2012 – 26 March 2013 =====
On 28 March 2012 Arqiva A moved to its final channel allocation at UHF 56, after the completion of digital switchover at Salisbury. Arqiva A and B and SDN also increased to full power (100 kW) on this date.

Frequency	UHF	kW	Operator	System
690.000 MHz	48	100	SDN	DVB-T
722.000 MHz	52	100	Arqiva B	DVB-T
738.000 MHz	54	100	Digital 3&4	DVB-T
754.000 MHz	56	100	Arqiva A	DVB-T
770.000 MHz	58	100	BBC B	DVB-T2
794.000 MHz	61	100	BBC A	DVB-T

===== 27 March 2013 – 27 February 2018 =====
BBC A moved from UHF 61 to UHF 49 to allow for the clearance of the 800 MHz band for 4G LTE mobile services.

Frequency	UHF	kW	Operator	System
690.000 MHz	48	100	SDN	DVB-T
698.000 MHz	49	100	BBC A	DVB-T
722.000 MHz	52	100	Arqiva B	DVB-T
738.000 MHz	54	100	Digital 3&4	DVB-T
754.000 MHz	56	100	Arqiva A	DVB-T
770.000 MHz	58	100	BBC B	DVB-T2

===== 27 February 2018 - 4 April 2019 =====
Arqiva A has moved from UHF 56 to UHF 33 for the start of the 700MHz clearance programme at Mendip.

Frequency	UHF	kW	Operator	System
570.000 MHz	33	100	Arqiva A	DVB-T
690.000 MHz	48	100	SDN	DVB-T
698.000 MHz	49	100	BBC A	DVB-T
722.000 MHz	52	100	Arqiva B	DVB-T
738.000 MHz	54	100	Digital 3&4	DVB-T
770.000 MHz	58	100	BBC B	DVB-T2

===== 4 April 2019 – 5 June 2019 =====
BBC A has moved from UHF 49 to UHF 32 as part of the 700MHz clearance programme at Mendip.

Frequency	UHF	kW	Operator	System
562.000 MHz	32	100	BBC A	DVB-T
570.000 MHz	33	100	Arqiva A	DVB-T
690.000 MHz	48	100	SDN	DVB-T
722.000 MHz	52	100	Arqiva B	DVB-T
738.000 MHz	54	100	Digital 3&4	DVB-T
770.000 MHz	58	100	BBC B	DVB-T2

===== 5 June 2019 - Present =====
Digital 3&4 has moved from UHF 54 to UHF 34, and BBC B have moved as well from UHF 58 to UHF 35 as part of the 700MHz clearance programme at Mendip. Many Welsh residents also prefer Mendip's service to the Wenvoe service as it provides a stronger signal to the coastline and areas in the shadow of the Wenvoe mast.

Frequency	UHF	kW	Operator	System
562.000 MHz	32	100	BBC A	DVB-T
570.000 MHz	33	100	Arqiva A	DVB-T
578.000 MHz	34	100	Digital 3&4	DVB-T
586.000 MHz	35	100	BBC B	DVB-T2
594.000 MHz	36	100	Arqiva B	DVB-T
690.000 MHz	48	100	SDN	DVB-T

== See also ==
- List of masts
- List of radio stations in the United Kingdom
- List of tallest buildings and structures in Great Britain
