= Crawley, Hampshire =

Village in Hampshire, England

Coordinates: 51.1108°N 1.3902°W

Crawley
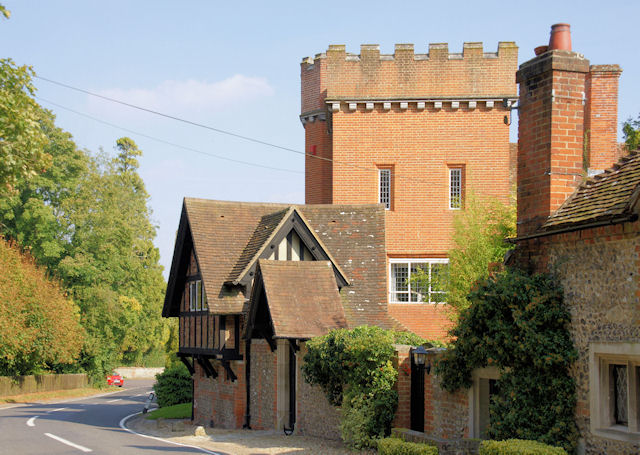
- The Dower House in Crawley

- Location within Hampshire
- Population: 418 (2011 Census)
- OS grid reference: SU4278834791
- Civil parish: Crawley
- District: City of Winchester
- Shire county: Hampshire
- Region: South East
- Country: England
- Sovereign state: United Kingdom
- Post town: WINCHESTER
- Postcode district: SO21
- Dialling code: 01962
- Police: Hampshire and Isle of Wight
- Fire: Hampshire and Isle of Wight
- Ambulance: South Central
- UK Parliament: Winchester

Crawley is a small village in Hampshire, England. It is a few miles from the county town (and former capital) of Winchester. It is a civil parish within the City of Winchester local government district. The village is the location of Crawley Court, currently the headquarters of broadcast infrastructure company Arqiva.

== Geography ==
The North Eastern boundary of the Parish runs along the Western side of the A272 from a location 1.6 km (0.99 mi) South East of the A272 and A30 junction to a point 2.3 km (1.4 mi) further South East along the A272, at this point it turns South West, along a field boundary for 850 m (0.53 mi). The B3049 (Winchester to Stockbridge Road) passes through the Southern portion of the Civil Parish from the crossroads near Rack and Manger cottages to the East side of Turnpike Copse, a distance of 2.6 km (1.6 mi). Another short length of the B3049 runs along the line of part of the Southern boundary of the parish for a distance of 760 m (830 yd), this is the section of the B3049 from the lodge at Tate's Plantation to Ball Down Farm.

Four roads each generally wider than 4m converge upon Crawley village, all meeting at the junction adjacent to Crawley Pond. The most Westerly of these roads leaves the B3049 at Folly Farm and heads in a North Easterly direction, passing Crawley Court, and after a distance of 1.4 km (0.87 mi) from the B3049 it arrives at St Mary's Church. From the Church the lane travels in an Easterly direction, forming the main street of the village, until finally it reaches the junction at the pond. The distance from the Church to the pond junction is 0.68 km (0.42 mi).

== Governance ==
As well as constituting the eponymous parish council, Crawley lies within the wider City of Winchester. The village is part of the Wonston and Micheldever ward of Winchester City Council, which elects three councillors, and part of the wider Winchester Downlands ward, which elects a councillor to Hampshire County Council.

== History ==
Crawley has a historically low crime rate due to its small size. One notable event in the village is the shooting of a heron within Crawley. Today, a thatched statue of the heron sits on top of the house where it was killed. As this was such a small event to the world, this is not found on news sites, but the people of Crawley haven't forgotten this event.
