= Digital 9 Infrastructure =

UK-listed investment company

- Company type: Public limited company
- Traded as: LSE: DGI9
- Industry: Digital infrastructure
- Founded: 2021; 5 years ago
- Headquarters: St Helier, Jersey
- Key people: Phil Jordan (chairman)
- Website: www.d9infrastructure.com

Digital 9 Infrastructure is an investment company which invests in digital infrastructure. It is listed on the London Stock Exchange. The company is managed by Triple Point Investment Management, a firm based in London.

== History ==
The company was the subject of an initial public offering on the specialist fund segment of the London Stock Exchange in March 2021. Later that month it acquired Aqua Comms DAC, a business operating 14,300 km of undersea fibre-optic cables in the Atlantic Ocean.

In July 2021, the company invested £50 million in a project to establish a new intercontinental subsea cable and terrestrial fibre system between the middle east and India, to be known as Europe Middle-East India Connect 1. Then, in September 2021, the company acquired Verne Global, a business operating a 24 Megawatt datacentre on a former NATO military site at Keflavík in Iceland. Next, in December 2021, it bought SeaEdge UK1, a business operating a coastal datacentre and subsea fibre landing station near Newcastle upon Tyne on the north east coast of England. It then acquired a 48% stake in Arqiva, the British telecommunications company, from the Canada Pension Plan, for C$585 million (US$454 million) in June 2022.

The company moved to the premium segment of the main market in August 2022. However, in November 2022, Investec expressed concerns about the sudden departure of the two managers employed by Triple Point to manage Digital 9 Infrastructure.

In March 2024, it was announced Digital 9 Infrastructure had completed the sale of its entire stake in Verne Global to the Paris-based private equity company, Ardian in a deal worth up to £450 million.
