= Sudbury transmitting station =

Transmitter station in Sudbury, Suffolk, England

Sudbury
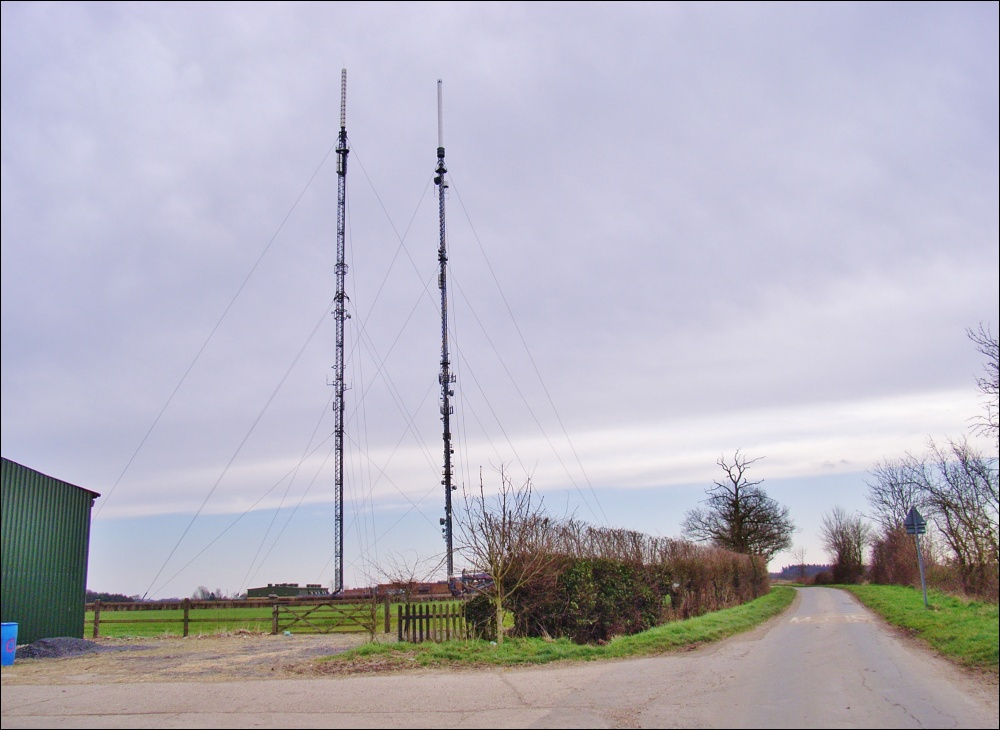

- Location within Suffolk
- Mast height: 165.8 metres (544 ft) (Mast 1); 103 metres (338 ft) (Mast 2)
- Coordinates: 52.004167°N 0.785833°E
- Grid reference: TL913377
- Built: 1967-1968
- BBC region: BBC East
- ITV region: ITV Anglia

The Sudbury transmitting station is a facility for telecommunications and broadcasting transmission at Sudbury, England. It consists of two guyed masts, one, the original, being 165.8 metres (544 ft) high, and a second mast (no longer in service) at 103 metres (338 ft). They have antennas attached at various heights. It is situated 14 miles (23 km) WSW of Ipswich at a site height of 70 m (230 ft). All 6 Digital TV MUXES are transmitted from Sudbury using an omnidirectional pattern at an ERP of 100 kW. Originally Sudbury was a B group transmitter but in order to accommodate the digital transmissions it went E group then, at its 700 MHz clearance in August 2018, it ended up a K group (or wideband). However, most B group, E group and wideband aerials will continue to work fine on it.

It broadcast television and radio services to central and southern Suffolk and most of Essex, however southern areas of the county received a better TV signal from the Crystal Palace TV transmitter. This includes cities and towns such as Ipswich, Chelmsford, Colchester, Southend, Clacton-on-Sea and Haverhill. Signals can also be received as far as north Kent.

This transmitter has 8 local relays: Burnham-on-Crouch, Clacton, Felixstowe, Ipswich Stoke, Rouncefall (Ashingdon, Essex), Somersham, Wivenhoe Park, and Woodbridge.

== Services available from this site ==
=== Digital radio ===
Frequency	Block	kW	Operator
222.064 MHz	11D	1	Digital One
225.648 MHz	12B	2.4	BBC National DAB
229.072 MHz	12D	1	NOW Essex

=== Digital television ===
Frequency	UHF	kW	Operator	System
538.000 MHz	29	100	SDN	DVB-T
554.000 MHz	31	100	Arqiva A	DVB-T
602.000 MHz	37	100	Arqiva B	DVB-T
634.000 MHz	41	100	Digital 3&4	DVB-T
658.000 MHz	44	100	BBC A	DVB-T
682.000 MHz	47	100	BBC B	DVB-T2

- Aerial group K is required to receive all channels.

==== Before switchover ====
Frequency	UHF	kW	Operator
618.000 MHz	39	7.5	BBC (Mux B)
690.166 MHz	48+	5	SDN (Mux A)
698.166 MHz	49+	7	BBC (Mux 1)
706.166 MHz	50+	1.1	Arqiva (Mux D)
738.000 MHz	54	1.5	Arqiva (Mux C)
754.000 MHz	56	1.1	Digital 3&4 (Mux 2)†
850.000 MHz	68	8.1	Digital 3&4 (Mux 2)

† Low power transmission from Sudbury B.

=== Analogue television ===
Frequency	UHF	kW	Service
583.25 MHz	35	50	Channel 5
631.25 MHz	41	250	Anglia
655.25 MHz	44	250	BBC2 East
679.25 MHz	47	250	Channel 4
711.25 MHz	51	250	BBC1 East

- Aerial group: B
- Polarisation: horizontal
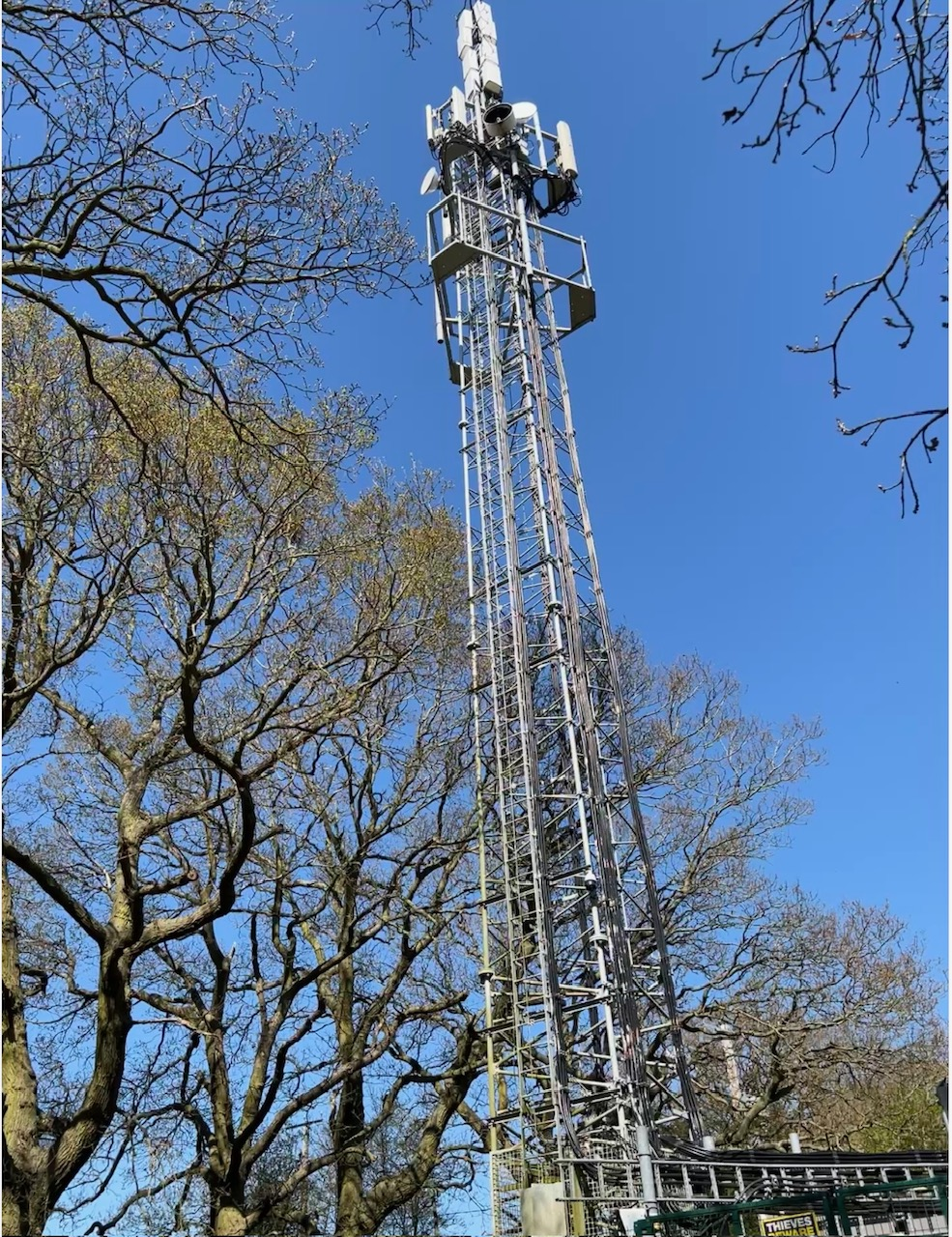
  Rouncefall transmitter

== See also ==
- List of masts
