= Halangy Down transmitter =

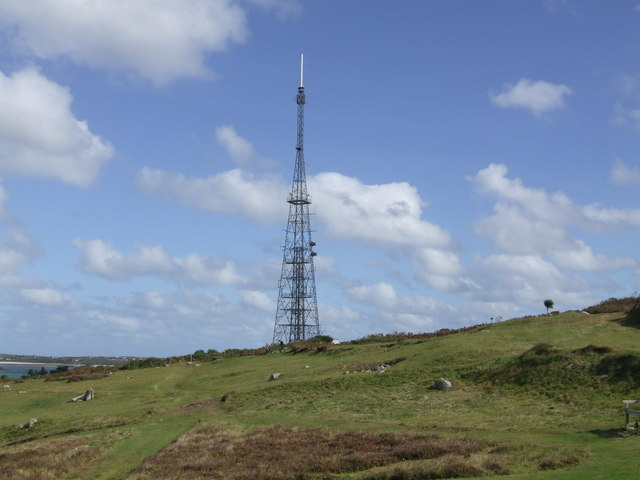

- Location within Isles of Scilly
- Mast height: 76.2 metres (250 ft)
- Coordinates: 49.932504°N 6.305314°W
- Built: 1969
- Relay of: Redruth
- BBC region: BBC South West
- ITV region: ITV West Country

The Halangy Down transmitter on St Mary's, Isles of Scilly is a 500-watt FM radio and television transmitter with a 76.2 metres (250 ft) high steel lattice tower, surmounted by a main TV antenna. It was built by the BBC in 1969 on Halangy Down which is 38.1 metres (125 ft) above sea level.

It is owned and operated by Arqiva. It is fed by the Redruth transmitting station and provides television and FM radio coverage for the Isles of Scilly. Two 1.2 metres (3.9 ft) dishes on the tower were installed in 2009 to support the switchover to Digital Television.

== See also ==
- List of masts
- List of tallest buildings and structures in Great Britain
