= Lichfield transmitting station =

Transmitter station in Staffordshire, England

Lichfield
- Location within Staffordshire
- Mast height: 305.2 metres (1,001 ft)
- Coordinates: 52.636667°N 1.758889°W
- Grid reference: SK1631404390
- Built: 1961
- ITV region: ABC (1961–1968); ATV (1961–1981); Central Independent Television (1982–1985)

The Lichfield transmitting station is situated close to Tamworth in Staffordshire in the West Midlands between the A5 and A51. The nearest geographical feature is Hopwas Hill. The station is owned and operated by Arqiva. The mast is known locally as Hopwas mast or Hints mast.

== History ==
The station was the main 405-line ITV transmitter for the Midlands from 1956 to 1985. It has a 305.2-metre-tall (1,001 ft) guyed mast.

The site was announced by the ITA in March 1955, to be 700 feet (210 m) above mean sea level on Gentleshaw Hill near Hints, Staffordshire, and to start broadcasting in December 1955. ITV itself would open in September 1955.

The tower would be 445 feet (136 m) tall. It would serve 6 million viewers, with test transmissions planned for October 1955. Lichfield Rural Council discussed the planning proposal. Planning permission was given in May 1955.

In July 1955, a barrage balloon was flown at 500 feet (150 m). Construction had begun by August 1955. Test transmissions would begin on 10 October 1955.

It was planned to start on 17 February 1956, with test transmissions from 1 February. It cost around £300,000.

=== Opening ===
The station came on air on 17 February 1956, using two 5 kW transmitters and a 16-stack antenna mounted on a 450-foot-tall (137 m) Eiffelised tower (one that is tapered exponentially towards the top).

Broadcasting began at 6.45 pm. It began at 50 kW erp, to be increased to 200 kW.

=== Replacement tower ===
Work on a new mast began in early November 1960. The former tower was replaced by the tall mast which came into service on 18 July 1961. The 450-foot (140 m) tower was dismantled in 1962 and shipped to Jersey, Channel Islands and re erected at Fremont Point on the north of the Island.

=== Transmission ===
625-line colour transmitters for the region were all co-sited at the nearby Sutton Coldfield transmitting station until 1997, when Lichfield began broadcasting Channel 5 in the Midlands. At 1000 kW on C37 it was the most powerful Channel 5 transmitter in the country. Before the digital switchover, Lichfield effectively worked in conjunction with Sutton Coldfield (4 miles (6 km) to the southwest) to supply the full five analogue channels. Reception of Channel 5 from Lichfield was also receivable at viewable quality throughout the borders of North Wales.

All analogue TV transmissions ceased on 21 September 2011, as part of the digital switchover. A temporary HD multiplex BBC B (Mux HD) on C34 was moved to the Sutton Coldfield transmitting station on C40+ (626.2 MHz) thereby ceasing all analogue and digital television broadcasts from the Lichfield transmitter.

== Services listed by frequency ==
=== Analogue radio (FM VHF) ===
Frequency	kW	Service
101.6 MHz	0.06	Capital Mid-Counties

=== Digital radio (DAB) ===
Frequency	Block	kW	Operator
220.35 MHz	11C	250	CE Birmingham
211.65 MHz	10B	250	Derbyshire

=== Analogue television ===
==== 17 February 1956 – 3 January 1985 ====
Frequency	VHF	kW	Service
189.75 MHz	8	400	Central (ABC until 1968/ATV until 1982)

==== 30 March 1997 – 21 September 2011 ====
Analogue television is no longer broadcast from Lichfield. Channel 5 closed on 21 September 2011.

Frequency	UHF	kW	Service
599.25 MHz	37	1000	Channel 5

=== Digital television ===
Digital television is no longer broadcast from Lichfield as of 21 September 2011.

Frequency	UHF	kW	Operator
578.0 MHz	34	4	BBC B (Mux HD)

== See also ==
- List of masts
- List of tallest buildings and structures in Great Britain
- List of radio stations in the United Kingdom
