= Mendlesham transmitting station =

Broadcasting facility

Mendlesham
- Location within Suffolk
- Location: Mendlesham, Stowmarket, Suffolk
- Mast height: 305.4 metres (1,002 ft)
- Coordinates: 52.234444°N 1.1075°E
- Grid reference: TM123640
- Built: 1959
- ITV region: Anglia Television (1959-1985)

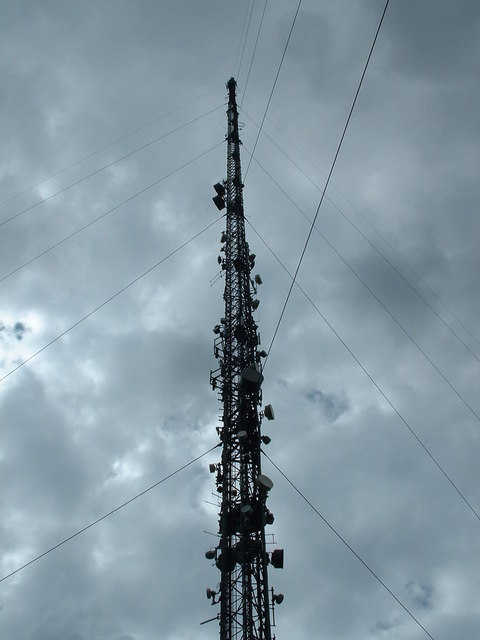
Calling occupants of earth - geograph.org.uk - 238426.

The Mendlesham transmitting station is a broadcasting and telecommunications facility, situated close to the village of Mendlesham, near the town of Stowmarket, in Suffolk, United Kingdom (grid reference TM123640). It is owned and operated by Arqiva.

It has a 305.4 metres (1,002 ft) high guyed steel lattice mast. It was originally commissioned to bring ITV signals (provided by Anglia Television) to East Anglia, including Norfolk, Suffolk and parts of Essex and Cambridgeshire on 405-line VHF, using Channel 11 (Band III).

== History ==
Other sites considered in February 1958 for an ITV television mast were Tacolneston and Snetterton. By June 1958, the site was chosen. The site was in the village of Wetheringsett-cum-Brockford, but Mendlesham was the name of the nearby airfield.

For the new ITV region, the GPO would provide a link from London to Norwich, via Ongar, Essex, Sibleys Green (Chickney, to Mendlesham, then on to the telecommunications tower at Stoke Holy Cross, and by cable from there to Norwich. Construction began in January 1959, with the mast being built from April 1959. By June 1959 it was 600 feet. Construction finished in mid-July 1959, taking ten weeks.

On Monday 5 October 1959, tests at full power of 200kW took place, from 10am to 9pm from Monday to Saturday. This was also the same day that the BBC started broadcasting from Norwich. It came into service on 27 October of that year. It was at the time the highest television mast to be constructed in Europe and the first of six of the same height subsequently used at other Independent Television Authority stations. It was fabricated in Hereford from zinc-galvanised steel, and was erected by British Insulated Callender's Construction Co. (BICC), now known as Balfour Beatty.

When UHF television came to East Anglia, main transmitters were commissioned at Tacolneston, near Norwich and Sudbury, near Colchester. Mendlesham was not required in the UHF plan, so when 405 line television was discontinued in the UK in 1985, the mast ceased to be used for any broadcast transmissions for over a decade.

However, in 1997, the site was chosen to be a main transmitter for new regional commercial radio station Vibe FM (renamed Kiss 105-108 in 2006), on 106.4 MHz VHF FM at a power of 20 kW. Vibe FM launched November 1997. Later in December 2001, national digital radio multiplex Digital One also added its antennas to the mast. The BBC National DAB Multiplex was added on 13 July 2010.

== Channels listed by frequency ==
=== Analogue radio (VHF FM) ===
Frequency	kW	Service
106.4 MHz	20	Greatest Hits Radio Ipswich & Suffolk

=== Digital radio (DAB) ===
Frequency	Block	kW	Operator
222.064 MHz	11D	1	Digital One
225.648 MHz	12B	4.3	BBC National DAB

=== Analogue television ===
VHF analogue television was transmitted from Mendlesham from its launch in 1959 until the nationwide shutdown of VHF signals in 1985.

Frequency	VHF	kW	Service
204.75 MHz	11	200	Anglia

== See also ==
- List of masts
- List of tallest buildings and structures in Great Britain
- List of radio stations in the United Kingdom
