= S4C Digital Networks =

United Kingdom digital TV multiplex operator

SDN
- Founded: 1997
- Headquarters: United Kingdom

SDN (S4C Digital Networks) is a company that operates one of the six multiplexes of channels on digital terrestrial television in the United Kingdom. Although it was co-founded by Welsh channel S4C in 1997, the company has been wholly owned by ITV plc since 2005.

== History ==
When digital terrestrial television was first launched in the UK, it was decided that Multiplex A must carry Channel 5 nationally, S4C in Wales and TeleG in Scotland. The right to operate the multiplex (and therefore the rest of the space) was to be given to the highest bidder. S4C (who were already guaranteed their 'gifted' space on the multiplex), United News and Media and NTL set up S4C Digital Networks (each owned one-third of the company) and bid for the right to operate Multiplex A. In the event, they were the only bidder and, after having their business plan approved, were awarded the licence to operate Multiplex A by the Independent Television Commission in 1997. Before their licence became active, the name of the company was changed from S4C Digital Networks to SDN.

Upon the activation of the licence in 1998, SDN began broadcasting Multiplex A in 64QAM mode at 24 megabits/second (which allows many channels to broadcast, though makes it more difficult to get a good signal). They rented out their capacity to various free and subscription channels (though S4C did keep their gifted space in Wales to launch S4C2). After the launch of Freeview to replace ITV Digital, the free services carried on Multiplex A became effectively part of Freeview. As SDN was not a member of the Freeview consortium, they were technically not part of the service (though they were available to all Freeview viewers).

In 2004, Top Up TV launched on Multiplex A, though it sub-let its capacity from Five, and not SDN directly. Multiplexes A and 2 were the only options for Top Up TV as the regulations set out by Ofcom directed that only free-to-air television channels could be broadcast on multiplexes 1, B, C and D, despite there being available space on some of those multiplexes. This regulation has since been lifted.

In 2005, SDN (by now 50.1% owned by S4C and 49.9% by United News and Media) was sold to Granada Media Group, which itself was a subsidiary of ITV plc. As ITV plc was by then a member of the Freeview consortium, the free services on Multiplex A became officially part of Freeview.

== ITV Digital ==
Prior to ITV Digital's collapse in 2002, SDN leased out most of its capacity to ITV Select (previously ONrequest). The ITV Select package consisted of five of SDN's streams, plus a sixth as a free "taster" channel. After 11pm, most of the ITV Select capacity was handed over to various adult channels, which included Television X and Adults Only channels 1–3. These channels have since left the platform, however SDN still holds the licences to broadcast these services. Other non-premium channels that were broadcast included BBC Four, CBeebies, BBC Red Button, BBC Knowledge, QVC (and prior to that, Shop!), TV Travel Shop, Simply Money (now Simply Shopping), the ITN News Channel and an NTL EPG. The ITN News Channel, TV Travel Shop and Simply Money time-shared with the ITV Select streams.

== See also ==
- Digital terrestrial television in the United Kingdom
- List of digital terrestrial television channels (UK)
