= Days Like This (Van Morrison song) =

1995 single by Van Morrison

Single by Van Morrison

from the album Days Like This
- A-side: "Days Like This"
- B-side: "I Don't Want to go on Without You"/"That Old Black Magic"
- Released: May 1995
- Genre: Folk rock, R&B
- Length: 3:13
- Label: Mercury Records
- Songwriter: Van Morrison
- Producer: Van Morrison

Van Morrison singles chronology
"Have I Told You Lately" (1995)	"Days Like This" (1995)	"Perfect Fit" (1995)

Music video
- "Days Like This" on YouTube

"Days Like This" is a song written by Northern Irish singer-songwriter Van Morrison and the title song of his 1995 album of the same name. Morrison has often performed this song in concert appearances, and it has become one of his most popular songs from his later years. It peaked at number 65 in the UK upon release, and later reached number 12 on the US Billboard US Rock Digital Song Sales chart.

== Recording and composition ==
"Days Like This" was recorded during the 1993–1994 sessions at Wool Hall Studios, Beckington and the Real World in Bath, Somerset. The song was inspired by the 1961 Shirelles hit "Mama Said", written by Luther Dixon and Willie Denson.

Before making his big break as a solo artist, Irish singer-songwriter Brian Kennedy performed backing vocals for this song, as well as others throughout the album, and features heavily in the music video.

== Legacy ==
It became the official anthem of the peace movement in Northern Ireland and the Northern Ireland Office used it along with "Brown Eyed Girl" as theme music for a television advertisement promoting the ceasefire. Morrison performed it for an audience of 60–80,000 people when President Bill Clinton visited Belfast, Northern Ireland on 30 November 1995. Clinton, himself a saxophonist, had shown an appreciation for Morrison's music and had wanted to perform but was advised against it by security officers.

In 2020 Irish singer Dermot Kennedy released a cover version on his album Without Fear: The Complete Edition.

== In the media ==
In 1997 "Days Like This" was featured on the soundtrack of the film As Good as It Gets. It was played several times in the 2007 film Because I Said So. It has also been used in a Channel 7 Australia ad campaign.

In episode 2 of season 4 of the Netflix Money Heist television series, the song is played.

Morrison has often performed this song in concert appearances, including at the Austin City Limits Music Festival.

== Other releases ==
- Live at Austin City Limits Festival (2006 Limited Cd)
- Van Morrison at the Movies - Soundtrack Hits
- The Best of Van Morrison Volume 3
- Still on Top - The Greatest Hits (remastered in 2007)

== Personnel ==
- Van Morrison – vocals, alto saxophone
- Ronnie Johnson – electric guitar
- Nicky Scott – bass
- Geoff Dunn – drums
- Teena Lyle – piano, backing vocals
- Kate St John – alto saxophone
- Pee Wee Ellis – tenor saxophone
- Leo Green – tenor saxophone
- Matthew Holland – trumpet
- Brian Kennedy – backing vocals
- Horns arranged by Pee Wee Ellis

== Charts ==
Chart (1995)	Peak Position
Europe (European Hit Radio)	39
UK Singles (OCC)	65

== Certifications ==
Certifications for "Days Like This"
Region	Certification	Certified units/sales
New Zealand (RMNZ)	Platinum	30,000^{‡}
United Kingdom (BPI)	Silver	200,000^{‡}
^{‡} Sales+streaming figures based on certification alone.
