= Perfect Fit =

Single by Van Morrison

from the album Days Like This
- A-side: "Perfect Fit"
- B-side: "Raincheck"/"Cleaning Windows" (live)
- Released: 11 September 1995
- Recorded: 1993–1994
- Genre: Celtic, Folk rock
- Length: 4:33
- Label: Mercury
- Songwriter(s): Van Morrison
- Producer(s): Van Morrison

Van Morrison singles chronology
| "Days Like This" (1995) | "Perfect Fit" (1995) | "No Religion" (1995) |

"Perfect Fit" is a song written by Northern Irish singer-songwriter Van Morrison and included on his 1995 album, Days Like This.

== Recording and composition ==
It was recorded at the sessions for Days Like This which took place at Wool Hall Studios at Beckington and Real World in Bath in 1993–1994.

Michelle Rocca, Morrison's longtime girlfriend, featured on the cover of the Days Like This album and the couple had become engaged in March 1995 shortly before the release of the album. Morrison had dedicated his song "Have I Told You Lately" to Rocca when he appeared at the IRMA awards in Dublin, during the same month.

"Perfect Fit" was the opening tune on the album and was described by Johnny Rogan as being "a transparent paean to Rocca." The song opens with the lines:

Now baby just lately you've been holding back too much
Your looks and my language, this could be the perfect touch
What you are asking fits with everything on my list
This could be the perfect fit

The song features prominent backing vocals by Irish singer songwriter Brian Kennedy.

== Personnel on original release ==
- Van Morrison – vocals, harmonica
- Ronnie Johnson – electric guitar
- Nicky Scott – bass
- Geoff Dunn – drums
- Teena Lyle – recorder, backing vocals
- Kate St. John – alto saxophone
- Pee Wee Ellis – tenor saxophone
- Leo Green – tenor saxophone
- Matthew Holland – trumpet
- Brian Kennedy – backing vocals
- Horns arranged by Pee Wee Ellis
