= Rough God Goes Riding =

Single by Van Morrison

from the album The Healing Game
- B-side: "At the End of the Day/The Healing Game" (Alternative take)
- Released: May 1997
- Recorded: 1996 (Dublin, Ireland)
- Genre: Folk rock, rock
- Length: 6:19
- Label: Polydor for Exile Productions Ltd.
- Songwriter: Van Morrison
- Producer: Van Morrison

Van Morrison singles chronology
| "The Healing Game" (1997) | "Rough God Goes Riding" (1997) | "Precious Time" (1999) |

"Rough God Goes Riding" is the opening song on the album, The Healing Game by Northern Irish singer-songwriter Van Morrison. The song reached No. 168 on the UK charts. One of the B-sides of the single, the alternative version of "The Healing Game", appears on all three editions of Morrison's 2007 compilation album Still on Top - The Greatest Hits. The other B-side "At the End of the Day" was released as a bonus track on the 2008 reissue of The Healing Game.

== Song analysis ==
According to biographer Clinton Heylin this song: "signalled a return to the religious and spiritual preoccupations that had driven Morrison's work throughout the eighties, the image of the Rough God being derived from Robin Williamson's 'Mr. Thomas' — recorded by Morrison for Inarticulate — in which 'the rough God goes riding with his shears', a reference to the avenging Messiah who shall return to wreak final judgement on Man."

Greil Marcus wrote that "The deep burr of Morrison's voice buries the words, which cease to matter; you might not hear them until the tenth time you play the album, or long after that. 'It's when that rough god goes riding,' he sings, drawing the words both from Yeats and down in his chest, and you might never know it's the Angel of Death that has you in its embrace."

== Appearance on other albums ==
"Rough God Goes Riding" has been included as one of fourteen songs on the last disc of the limited 3 disc edition of the 2007 compilation album, Still on Top - The Greatest Hits. It is the only song from the album included on 2015 compilation The Essential Van Morrison.

On the 2015 album Duets: Re-working the Catalogue, Morrison performs the song as a duet with his daughter Shana.

== Other performances ==
A performance of the song, featuring special guests Candy Dulfer and Fred Wesley, was shown on the 1998 Rockpalast Christmas special on German television.

== Personnel on original release ==
- Van Morrison – vocal, harmonica
- Robin Aspland – piano
- Alec Dankworth – double bass
- Geoff Dunn – drums
- Pee Wee Ellis – baritone saxophone
- Leo Green – tenor saxophone
- Ronnie Johnson – electric guitar
- Brian Kennedy – background vocals
- Katie Kissoon – background vocals
