= The Healing Game (song) =

Single by Van Morrison

from the album The Healing Game
- A-side: "The Healing Game"
- B-side: "Full Force Gale 96/Look What the Good People Done" or "Have I Told You Lately/Whenever God Shines His Light/Gloria"
- Released: 10 February 1997
- Recorded: 13 August 1996
- Genre: Folk rock, rock
- Length: 5:16
- Label: Polydor for Exile Productions Ltd.
- Songwriter: Van Morrison
- Producer: Van Morrison

Van Morrison singles chronology
"That's Life" (1996)	"The Healing Game" (1997)	"Rough God Goes Riding" (1997)

"The Healing Game" is the title song on Northern Irish singer-songwriter Van Morrison's 1997 album. It was released twice as a single in 1997 as an A-side with different B-sides – including "Have I Told You Lately" and "Gloria". The single reached number 46 in the UK.

== Recording and composition ==
"The Healing Game" was recorded in 1996 at Windmill Lane Studios in Dublin with Walter Samuel as engineer.

Morrison explains the song in Q Magazine as: "The song is about when people used to sing on the streets: It came from America, where they had all the doo-wop groups. That's the general idea of the song: you've never really moved from this position. You took a lot of detours but you're still back on the corner."

Brian Hinton remarks on the song: "Van is like the protagonists in Yeats play, Purgatorial, condemned to eternal recurrence, 'here I am again', back with the 'backstreet jelly roll'....only music can assuage."

== Other releases ==
"The Healing Game" is one of the songs on disc one of the 2007 compilation album, The Best of Van Morrison Volume 3. It is also included as one of the hits on Morrison's third compilation album issued in 2007 — Still on Top - The Greatest Hits. It is listed as an alternate take and appears on both the 2-CD album issued in the UK and also the single disc – 21 hit album released in the US on 6 November 2007.

== Personnel ==
- Van Morrison – vocals
- Georgie Fame – Hammond organ, backing vocals
- Ronnie Johnson – electric guitar
- Nicky Scott – electric bass
- Alec Dankworth – double bass
- Leo Green – tenor saxophone, backing vocals
- Ralph Salmins – percussion
- Geoff Dunn – drums
- Pee Wee Ellis – baritone saxophone, backing vocals
- Matt Holland – trumpet, backing vocals
- Haji Ahkba – flugelhorn
- Robin Aspland – piano
- Brian Kennedy – backing vocals
- Horns arranged by – Leo Green and Matt Holland

== Covers ==
John Lee Hooker recorded a duet of this song with Van Morrison and included it on his 1997 album, Don't Look Back.

== Charts ==
Chart (1997)	Peak position
UK Singles (OCC)	46
