= BBC National DAB =

British digital audio broadcasting multiplex

- Licensed area: United Kingdom
- Frequency: 12B (225.648 MHz)
- Air date: 27 September 1995
- Owner: BBC
- Website: www.bbc.co.uk

BBC National DAB is a digital audio broadcasting multiplex in the UK, for a number of radio stations which have UK wide coverage. The multiplex is owned and operated by the BBC and is transmitted from a number of transmitter sites across the country; it only carries BBC radio stations.

As of the end of 2017, more than 97% of the UK's population are within reach of the multiplex following the completion of the switching on of a fourth set of new transmitters over the previous two years which had seen the reach increase from 93%. Any further expansion of DAB radio is awaiting a decision by government on any possible digital radio switchover.

== Stations carried ==
The following channels are receivable on any digital-equipped DAB radio in the BBC National DAB coverage area:

=== Full time services ===
Service	Service ID	Bit rate	Format	Audio channels	Description	Analogue availability
BBC Radio 1	C221	112 kbit/s	DAB	Joint stereo	Youth-orientated popular music	97.1 - 99.8 MHz
BBC Radio 2	C222	112 kbit/s	DAB	Joint stereo	Adult-orientated popular music	88.1 - 90.2 MHz
BBC Radio 3	C223	160-192 kbit/s	DAB	Joint stereo	Classical music, jazz and opera	90.3 - 92.6 MHz
BBC Radio 4	C224	80-112 kbit/s	DAB	Mono / joint stereo	Speech-led programmes	92.5 - 96.1 MHz; 103.5 - 104.9 MHz; 198 LW (until 27 June 2026)
BBC Radio 5 Live	C225	64-80 kbit/s	DAB	Mono	Live news and sport	693, 909, 990 kHz and BBC Local Radio overnight
BBC Radio 6 Music	C22B	112 kbit/s	DAB	Joint stereo	Alternative music	—
BBC Radio 1Xtra	C22A	112 kbit/s	DAB	Joint stereo	Black contemporary music	—
BBC Radio 4 Extra	C22C	80 kbit/s	DAB	Mono	Archive-led programmes	—
BBC Asian Network	C236	64 kbit/s	DAB	Mono	South Asian contemporary music	Various MW
BBC World Service	C238	64 kbit/s	DAB	Mono	International news and current affairs	On Radio 4 frequencies between 01:00 and 05:00 daily
BBC Radio 1 Anthems	C22D	32 kbit/s	DAB+	Stereo	Popular music from late 90s to present	
BBC Radio 1 Dance	C229	32 kbit/s	DAB+	Stereo	Dance and electronic music	
BBC Radio 3 Unwind	C22E	32 kbit/s	DAB+	Stereo	Classical and meditation music	
BBC Guide	E1C79E5E	16-32 kbit/s	DAB	Data	Hidden service, EPG data	—

=== Part time services ===
The BBC National DAB multiplex makes use of dynamic ensemble reconfiguration to allow a number of part-time services to broadcast. While these additional services are on air the bit rates of (one or more of) BBC Radio 3, BBC Radio 4, BBC Radio 5 Live, and data services are reduced.

Station Name	Description
BBC Radio 5 Sports Extra	Live sport - broadcasts either Test Match Special or a second sporting event when BBC Radio 5 Live is also broadcasting live sport.

=== Former services ===
Two regularly scheduled BBC Radio 4 long-wave programmes were, prior to April 2024, provided to DAB listeners by way of dynamic daily opt-outs which popped up on the national DAB multiplex. With the cessation of separate scheduling on long wave from 1 April 2024, these programmes were relocated to broadcast on Radio 4 Extra, ending use of the dynamic pop-ups for these.

Station Name	Description
Yesterday In Parliament	Radio 4 LW opt-out simulcast; weekdays 08:30-09:00; Saturdays 08:45-09:00.
The Daily Service	Christian Music and Worship, Radio 4 LW opt-out simulcast; weekdays 09:45-10:00.

=== "Pop-up" services ===
The BBC has experimented with short-term "pop-up" digital radio stations, each broadcasting for approximately four days at a time, covering music festivals and other special events. The first to broadcast was BBC Radio 5 Live Olympics Extra in 2012, then BBC Radio 2 Eurovision launched for the first time in 2014, and was joined by BBC Radio 2 Country, BBC Music Jazz in 2015 and BBC Radio 2 50s in April 2016. When these temporary stations are on air, there is normally a reduction in bit rate of their parent station.

Station Name	Description
BBC 5 Live Olympics Extra	Available during 2012 Summer Olympics with coverage consisting of sports commentaries.
BBC Radio 2 Eurovision	Launched in May 2014 to extend the BBC's coverage of the Eurovision Song Contest. Returned in 2015 to provide coverage of the 2015 contest.
BBC Radio 2 Country	Launched in March 2015 to provide coverage of London's C2C: Country to Country Country music festival. Returned in 2016 to cover the 2016 festival and again in 2017.
BBC Music Jazz	Launched in November 2015 as a joint venture between BBC Radio 3 and Jazz FM, with programming celebrating jazz music in all its varied forms.
BBC Radio 2 50s	Launched in April 2016 as a celebration of the music and entertainment of the 1950s.
BBC Radio 1 Vintage	Available in September 2017 as a celebration of BBC Radio 1's 50th anniversary.
BBC Radio 2 Beatles	Launched in September 2019 as a celebration of 50 years of the Beatles album Abbey Road featuring interviews on how the album was created and how it influenced the next generation of music artists.

=== Planned station closures ===
In 2010, the BBC published plans to close BBC Radio 6 Music and BBC Asian Network. These plans were later rejected, saving both stations from closure. Radio 6 Music was retained after listening figures increased and a campaign was set up on Facebook, which gained 180,000 supporters.

== See also ==
- Timeline of Digital Audio Broadcasting in the UK
- Digital One
- Sound Digital
