= Sometimes We Cry =

Song by Van Morrison

from the album The Healing Game
- Released: 4 March 1997
- Recorded: 1996 (Dublin, Ireland)
- Genre: Folk rock
- Length: 5:14
- Label: Mercury
- Songwriter: Van Morrison
- Producer: Van Morrison

"Sometimes We Cry" is a song written by Northern Irish singer-songwriter Van Morrison and included on his 1997 album, The Healing Game. This version features the backing vocals of Brian Kennedy and Georgie Fame.

It has often been performed as a duet and a version with Morrison and Tom Jones was included on Jones' Reload album that was released in 1999 and charted at No. 1 on the UK charts in both 1999 and 2000.

Van Morrison's daughter Shana Morrison has often performed this as a duet with her father when she makes appearances at his concerts and also released it on her 1999 album, 7 Wishes. On this album version, her father joins in at the end of the song with his harmonica playing and vocals on the last verse. Shana said in an interview that she was surprised that her father agreed to over-dub his harmonica solo on the previously recorded studio song:

He usually does things live in one take and is opposed to any over-dubbing. It just came about all of a sudden. I asked him to do it, and he said yes. Maybe he was in a good mood that day.

== Covers ==
- Tom Jones with Van Morrison (Reload album, 1999)
- Shana Morrison with Van Morrison
- J. Michaels Band

== Personnel ==
- Van Morrison – vocals
- Georgie Fame – Hammond organ, backing vocals
- Ronnie Johnson – electric guitar
- Nicky Scott – electric bass guitar
- Alec Dankworth – double bass
- Leo Green – tenor saxophone
- Ralph Salmins – percussion
- Geoff Dunn – drums
- Pee Wee Ellis – soprano saxophone, horn arrangements
- Matt Holland – trumpet
- Haji Akbar – flugelhorn
- Robin Aspland – piano
- Brian Kennedy – backing vocals
