= The Black Feathers =

British music duo founded 2012

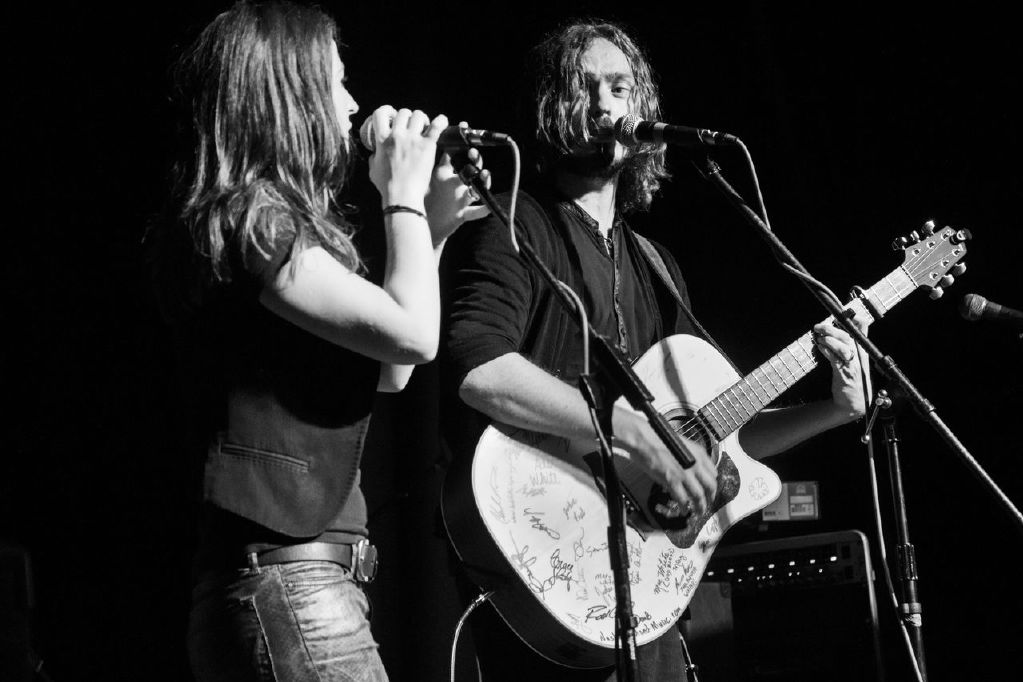
- The Black Feathers in 2014

Background information
- Origin: Gloucestershire, United Kingdom
- Genres: Folk, Americana, Roots
- Instruments: Vocals, guitar
- Years active: 2012–present
- Labels: Bird in the Hand Records, Blue House Music
- Website: theblackfeathers.com

The Black Feathers are a husband and wife roots music duo based in Gloucestershire, UK who play a blend of Folk and Americana. Their debut EP (Strangers We Meet, 2014) was listed in The Telegraph as one of the best Folk albums of 2014.

Their sound has been likened to that of The Civil Wars, and Gillian Welch and Dave Rawlings.

They are sponsored by Cole Clark guitars, Shubb Capos, and Blackstar Amplification.

== History ==
Sian Chandler was born in Cirencester, while Ray Hughes is a native of Dublin. Ray is classically trained and studied at the Royal Irish Academy of Music in Dublin. Sian began training as an actress before dropping out to focus on music. They met in 2004 and played in a five-piece Folk rock band called ‘Just To Annoy Ray’. When the band folded in 2008 they began playing together as a duo playing covers. In 2012 they started writing their own songs and formed as The Black Feathers.

== 2013 – 2015 ==
In 2013 The Black Feathers won two awards, the Folkstock award for best live performance , and The Five Valleys Folk award which saw them play main support to Spiers and Boden.

They were interviewed by Bob Harris on the "Under The Apple Tree Sessions" and were featured in two documentaries on BBC Radio 2 and BBC Radio 2 Country, as well as being interviewed in The Sunday Times alongside The Shires and Ward Thomas.

=== Strangers We Meet EP ===
In October 2013, The Black Feathers launched a successful Kickstarter campaign, hitting their target in less than 12hrs.
The resulting Strangers We Meet EP was released on their own label, ‘Bird in the Hand Records’, in February 2014. It received favourable reviews in national publications such as FRoots, The Telegraph, Acoustic Magazine and R2 (Rock'n'Reel).

Songs from the EP have been played numerous times on regional BBC Radio, as well as BBC Radio Scotland, BBC Radio 2, and BBC Radio 2 Country. In addition it was listed in Johnny Coppin’s ‘best acoustic albums in 2014’ on BBC Radio Gloucestershire, Martin Chilton's "The best folk albums of 2014" in The Telegraph and as the Sunday Mercury’s Number 1 Folk and Roots album of 2014.

Their music video for their single 'Strangers We Meet' was premiered on American television network Zuus Country. It was produced by Villain Place, the same team that created the award winning Florida Georgia Line official lyric videos.

== 2015 – 2016 ==
=== Soaked to the Bone ===
Their award winning debut album ‘Soaked to the Bone’ was crowd funded through PledgeMusic. They hit their target within 4 days, and completed the project raising 229% over the original target.

Three singles were released from the album. ‘Down by the River’ and ‘All For You’ received regional and online radio play including BBC Radio Gloucestershire and Amazing Radio. ‘Winter Moves In’ was released in aid of Marie Curie (charity) with 100% of the proceeds going to the charity. The single received regional radio play as well as being played by Tom Robinson on BBC Radio 6. The official music video for ‘Winter Moves In’ won an award at Portsmouth Film Festival for ‘Achievement in Art’ in September 2016.

Soaked to the Bone was officially released in February 2016 on Blue House Music and made the top 40 in the Official Charts Company Americana Chart. It received some five star reviews in the music press both online and offline such as Rolling stone Germany and Music News. The Album also won ‘Debut Album of the Year’ in the 2016 Fatea Awards.

The album includes a version of Make You Feel My Love written by Bob Dylan.

Songs from the album have had extensive BBC regional radio play including BBC Wales, BBC Scotland and Scottish Gaelic station BBC Nan Gaidheal. National radio play included BBC Radio 2 on The Bob Harris show, played by Paul Sexton and by Bob Harris himself. ‘Soaked to the Bone’ also made BBC Radio Ulster’s album of the week and was played on and added to the RTÉ Radio 1 playlist.

They went on to win ‘Best Duo’ at the G.S.M.C Awards 2016.

== Touring ==
The Black Feathers have supported Ray Davies at The Colston Hall in Bristol and toured with Eddi Reader both in Ireland and Northern Ireland. They have also shared a stage with artists such as Heather Peace, Ward Thomas, Ben Ottewell (Gomez), Luke Concannon (Nizlopi), Jim Moray, Paper Aeroplanes, Kim Richey, and Gareth Dunlop.

The band have toured nationally including venues such as Cambridge Folk Festival, St Pancras Old Church in London, and Colston Hall in Bristol, and all over Europe.

== Discography ==
=== Albums ===
Title	Tracklist	Details
Soaked to the Bone	1. Take Me Back; 2. Goodbye Tomorrow; 3. Arglight; 4. Blind; 5. All For You; 6. Homesick; 7. Winter Moves In; 8. Down by the River; 9. Make You Feel My Love; 10. Spider and the Fly; 11. Clear Blue Sky	Released: 26 February 2016; Label: Blue House Music; Formats: CD, Limited Edition LP, digital download

=== Extended plays ===
Title	Tracklist	Details
Strangers We Meet	1. Strangers We Meet; 2. 10,000 Times; 3. Open Book; 4. You Will Be Mine; 5. All Came Down	Released: 24 February 2014; Label: Bird in the Hand Records; Formats: CD, digital download
Holy Water	1. Holy Water; 2. Lighthouse On Fire (Demo); 3. Fur And Bone (Demo); 4. Fly Away (Demo); 5. Holy Water (Demo)	Released: 1 September 2017; Label: None; Formats: Limited Edition CD, digital download
The Ghosts Have Eaten Well	1. The Ghosts Have Eaten Well; 2. Moonlight (Demo); 3. Silver Lining (Demo); 4. Chemical Romance (Demo); 5. The Ghosts Have Eaten Well (Demo)	Released: 22 June 2018; Label: None; Formats: Limited Edition CD, digital download
