= Back on Top (Van Morrison album) =

Studio album by Van Morrison
- Released: 8 March 1999
- Recorded: 1998
- Studios: The Wool Hall (Beckington, UK); Windmill Lane (Dublin, Ireland) (strings)
- Genres: Blues, R&B, rock
- Length: 52:08
- Label: Pointblank/Virgin
- Producer: Van Morrison

Van Morrison chronology
The Philosopher's Stone (1998)	Back on Top (1999)	The Skiffle Sessions – Live in Belfast 1998 (2000)

Singles from Back on Top
- 1. "Precious Time" Released: February 1999; 2. "Back on Top" Released: May 1999; 3. "Philosopher's Stone" Released: August 1999

Back on Top is the twenty-seventh studio album by Northern Irish singer/songwriter Van Morrison, released in 1999 by Pointblank. It reached the Top Twenty in seven countries, building on the success of 1997's The Healing Game.

== Recording ==
Recorded at the Wool Hall Studios, south of Bath, England, except strings, which were recorded at Windmill Lane Studios, Dublin, Ireland. The musicians on the album are understated with Ian Jennings playing double bass, Geraint Watkins playing Hammond organ and Pee Wee Ellis on saxophones.

== Composition ==
The opening track, "Goin' Down Geneva", has a bluesy feel. Morrison's harmonica is prominent on "Philosopher's Stone", which features "one of the most limber vocal performances he's put on record in years, even tentatively jumping into the high squawk he seemed to have lost." Harmonica also features on "High Summer", which includes references to "Lucifer" and "God", and also alludes to Morrison's 1960s songs by way of "red sport cars" and "mansions on the hill". "In the Midnight" is "bedroom music, pure and simple", while "Back on Top" is an optimistic statement of the singer's outlook. The ballad, "When the Leaves Come Falling Down", features a string section, while "Golden Autumn Day" is about being mugged.

"Reminds Me of You" dates back to a 1996 break-up of his engagement to Michelle Rocca; they had reunited by the time of the song's release. "New Biography" was prompted by Brian Hinton's Celtic Crossroads, written in 1996. Morrison complains about celebrity and "'so-called friends' who chose to spill inside information and memories to biographers." Morrison has often performed "Precious Time" live, which includes the lyrics, "It doesn’t matter to which God you pray/Precious time is slipping away."

== Release ==
The video for the title track received significant airplay on the Canadian music station, "MuchMoreMusic". Performances of "Back on Top" and "When the Leaves Come Falling Down", along with "Gloria", featured on Later... with Jools Holland on 16 April 1999.

The photograph of Morrison on the inside of the album cover was originally used for the front cover of Peter Handke's book, My Year in the No-Man's-Bay (1994). The album was remastered and reissued on 29 January 2008 with two bonus tracks; an alternative take of "Philosopher's Stone", and a new arrangement of Fats Domino's song, "Valley of Tears". "Golden Autumn Day" was also used as the credits song for the 2001 and 2004 World Series.

== Reception ==
Professional ratings
Review scores
Source	Rating
AllMusic	4/5 stars
Entertainment Weekly	A−
George Graham	(unrated)
Rolling Stone	3/5 stars

The album received mixed reviews from critics, but performed well commercially and was his highest charting album in the US since Wavelength. It went gold in both the US and UK. Allmusic welcomed Morrison's "return to the music that suits him so well... blues and R&B", and found that the album finds him "celebrating life and its pleasures to the limit." Rolling Stone summed it up as being "solid, brilliant, silly in sad ways. But it's still one Monet and nine Norman Rockwells." The Irish Independent was critical, suggesting that "[somewhere] in the mid-Eighties the poet/philosopher accolades seem to have seeped into his skull, and he began churning out same-sounding albums on an almost annual basis." Critic George Graham lauded it as "one of his best, most tasteful albums in recent years, and Van Morrison has had some very good albums in this period."

== Track listing ==
All songs by Van Morrison, unless otherwise noted.

1. "Goin' Down Geneva" – 4:24
2. "Philosopher's Stone" – 6:05
3. "In the Midnight" – 5:07
4. "Back on Top" – 4:23
5. "When the Leaves Come Falling Down" – 5:39
6. "High Summer" – 5:12
7. "Reminds Me of You" – 5:39
8. "New Biography" – 5:23
9. "Precious Time" – 3:45
10. "Golden Autumn Day" – 6:31

Bonus tracks (2008 CD reissue)

11. "Philosopher's Stone" – 4:52 (alternate take)
12. "Valley of Tears" – 5:02 (Fats Domino, arranged Morrison)

== Personnel ==
- Van Morrison – vocals, acoustic guitar, harmonica, producer
- Mick Green – acoustic and electric guitars
- Pee Wee Ellis – soprano, tenor and baritone saxophones, background vocals
- Matt Holland – trumpet
- Geraint Watkins – piano, Hammond organ
- Fiachra Trench – piano
- Ian Jennings – double bass
- Liam Bradley – drums, percussion, background vocals
- Bobby Irwin – drums
- Brian Kennedy – background vocals
- Irish Film Orchestra – strings
- Leo Green – tenor saxophone (2008 reissue)
- Jools Holland – piano (2008 reissue)
- Mike Sanchez – piano, guitar (2008 reissue)

Production

- Walter Samuel – recording, mixing
- Brian Masterson – recording
- Sean Doherty – assistant engineer
- Sam Miller – assistant engineer
- Ciaran Cahill – assistant engineer
- Ian Cooper – mastering
- Brad Wilson – photography
- Paul Cox – photography
- John Mintoft – photography
- Matt Curtis – photography, art direction, design

== Charts ==
=== Weekly charts ===
Chart (1999)	Peak position
Australian Albums (ARIA)	13
Austrian Albums (Ö3 Austria)	28
Belgian Albums (Ultratop Flanders)	29
Dutch Albums (Album Top 100)	21
German Albums (Offizielle Top 100)	20
New Zealand Albums (RMNZ)	5
Norwegian Albums (VG-lista)	1
Scottish Albums (Official Charts)	17
Swedish Albums (Sverigetopplistan)	5
Swiss Albums (Schweizer Hitparade)	42
UK Albums (Official Charts)	11
US Billboard 200	28

=== Year-end charts ===
Chart (1999)	Position
UK Albums (OCC)	82

=== Singles ===
UK Singles Chart

Year	Single	Position
1999	"Precious Time"	36
1999	"Back on Top"	69
1999	"Philosopher's Stone"	171

== Certifications ==
Region	Certification	Certified units/sales
Canada (Music Canada)	Gold	50,000^{^}
New Zealand (RMNZ)	Platinum	15,000^{^}
Norway (IFPI Norway)	Gold	25,000^{*}
Spain (Promusicae)	Gold	50,000^{^}
United Kingdom (BPI)	Gold	100,000^{^}
United States (RIAA)	Gold	500,000^{^}
^{*} Sales figures based on certification alone.^{^} Shipments figures based on certification alone.
