= Back on Top (song) =

Single by Van Morrison

from the album Back on Top
- A-side: "Back on Top"
- B-side: "John Brown's Body" and "I'm Ready"
- Released: 1999
- Recorded: 1998, Wool Hall Studios, Beckington
- Genre: Blues, R&B
- Length: 3:23
- Label: Polydor
- Songwriter(s): Van Morrison
- Producer(s): Van Morrison

Van Morrison singles chronology
"Precious Time" (1999)	"Back on Top" (1999)	"Philosopher's Stone" (1999)

"Back on Top" is a song written by Northern Irish singer-songwriter Van Morrison and the title track on his 1999 album, Back on Top. It was released as a single in the UK and charted at number sixty-nine.

== Recording and composition ==
"Back on Top" was recorded in 1998 at Wool Hall Studios in Beckington, with Walter Samuel as engineer.

It has a happy upbeat melody and the optimistic lyrics may be about being successful in personal relationships as well as professionally successful.

"Always strivin', always climbing way beyond my will"
"It's the same old sensation, isolation at the top of the hill"

The Allmusic review for the album, says that "'Back on Top', the title track, swings along with such ease that you're tempted to check and make sure you didn't put in Moondance by mistake."

In his live concerts, Morrison has often entered on stage playing harmonica as the band starts up this song.

== Appearance on other albums ==
A live performance version from Morrison's appearance at the Austin City Limits Festival on 15 September 2006 was included on the limited edition album, Live at Austin City Limits Festival. It was included on the 2007 compilation album, The Best of Van Morrison Volume 3 and also on the 2007 compilation album, Still on Top - The Greatest Hits.

== Personnel ==
- Van Morrison – vocals, harmonica
- Fiachra Trench – piano
- Geraint Watkins – Hammond organ
- Mick Green – electric and acoustic guitars
- Ian Jennings – double bass
- Bobby Irwin – drums
- Pee Wee Ellis – tenor saxophone
- Brian Kennedy – backing vocals
