= BBC Radio 2 50s =

- United Kingdom
- Broadcast area: United Kingdom; available worldwide through the internet
- Frequency: DAB: 12B

Programming
- Language: English
- Format: 1950s

Ownership
- Owner: BBC
- Sister stations: BBC Radio 2

History
- First air date: 14 April 2016; 9 years ago
- Last air date: 17 April 2016; 9 years ago

Links
- Website: www.bbc.co.uk/programmes/p03lsql7

BBC Radio 2 50s was a temporary pop-up DAB service from the BBC, that broadcast from 14:00 on Thursday 14 April 2016 until Sunday 17 April 2016. It played music from the 1950s, which had received much less airplay on Radio 2 since the 1990s.

== Presenters ==
- Don Black
- Desmond Carrington
- Jamie Cullum
- Russell Davies
- Chris Evans
- Len Goodman
- Leo Green
- Sheila Hancock
- Bob Harris
- Richard Hawley
- Paul Jones
- Bill Kenwright
- Stuart Maconie
- Imelda May
- Huey Morgan
- Iggy Pop
- Suzi Quatro
- Mark Radcliffe
- Clare Teal
- Marty Wilde
- Gary Williams
- Steve Wright

== See also ==
- BBC Radio 2 Country
- BBC Music Jazz
