= If You Love Me (Van Morrison song) =

Promotional single by Van Morrison / Van Morrison & B.B. King

from the album The Healing Game and Deuces Wild
- A-side: "If You Love Me"
- Released: 1997
- Recorded: 1996
- Genre: Country blues; doo-wop
- Length: 5:01 (The Healing Game version)
- Label: Polydor for Exile Productions Ltd.
- Songwriter: Van Morrison
- Producer: Van Morrison (The Healing Game version) / John Porter

Van Morrison / Van Morrison & B.B. King singles chronology
"Rough God Goes Riding" (1997)	"If You Love Me" (1997)	"Precious Time" (1999)

"If You Love Me" is a song by Northern Irish singer and songwriter Van Morrison. It first appeared on Morrison's 1997 album The Healing Game, but the best known version is the duet with blues musician B. B. King, released the same year as a promotional single and on King's album Deuces Wild. Despite not charting significantly internationally, it has become a favorite on streaming platforms.
