= Days Like This (Van Morrison album) =

Studio album by Van Morrison
- Released: 5 June 1995
- Recorded: 1995
- Studios: Windmill Lane (Dublin, Ireland); The Wool Hall (Beckington, UK); Real World (Box, UK)
- Genres: Celtic rock, folk rock, blues
- Length: 57:33
- Label: Polydor
- Producer: Van Morrison

Van Morrison chronology
A Night in San Francisco (1994)	Days Like This (1995)	How Long Has This Been Going On (1995)

Singles from Days Like This
- 1. "Days Like This" Released: May 1995; 2. "Perfect Fit" Released: September 1995; 3. "No Religion" Released: November 1995

Days Like This is the twenty-third studio album by Northern Irish singer-songwriter Van Morrison, released in 1995. It is a diverse group of songs offering a variety of moods and styles. It ranked No. 5 on the UK album charts and was nominated for the Mercury Prize.

== Composition ==
His daughter, singer-songwriter Shana Morrison performed duets with her father on two tracks, "You Don't Know Me" and "I'll Never Be Free". "Ancient Highway" is nine minutes long and contains the lyric "praying to my higher self/Don't let me down". It is said to be the one song on the album where he comes closest to following his muse. The title track has continued to be a popular song in concert to the present day. Most of the songs are reflective and seem to come during a time of self-examination. "No Religion" came about Morrison explained when he was thinking: "Wouldn't it be great just to be born and nobody told you there was such a thing as religion? Say it didn't exist and you were just told that all you've got is this life and that's it...and there's no heaven, no hell." The song, "Songwriter" spoke of his songwriting techniques as a practical application instead of inspired as in the past. "Melancholia" and "Underlying Depression" continue the theme of soul searching.

== Reception ==
Professional ratings
Review scores
Source	Rating
AllMusic	4/5 stars
Christgau's Consumer Guide	(1-star Honorable Mention)
Entertainment Weekly	B

At the time of its release in 1995, Days Like This was Morrison's best selling non-compilation album and was nominated for the Mercury Music Award. David Sinclair in Q describes the album as a "glorious return to form", while the Entertainment Weekly reviewer found that "Days Like This, is too perfunctory to call it a return to form, but surprisingly, there is real spark." Other reviews were less enthusiastic: Tom Moon's Rolling Stone review states: "There are moments of genius followed by lavish displays of questionable taste, sometimes within the same song." In The Village Voice, Robert Christgau named "You Don't Know Me" and "Songwriter" as highlights, while summing the record up with a quoted lyric from the latter song: "I'm a songwriter, and my check's in the mail". The Music Box rated it with 3 stars and mildly endorsed it: "The latest release from Van Morrison is really only for his true fans. It's enjoyable, but it doesn't seem as inspired as his last few albums." Allmusic summed it up as an album that is a "completely competent yet completely uninspired pop-R&B workout, with Van sounding as if he couldn't care less about the words leaving his mouth."

== Cover ==
The cover of the album showed Morrison and his then-girlfriend, now ex-wife, Michelle Rocca walking a pair of greyhounds. It was his first album in 24 years to feature a female companion on the cover. The last had been the cover of Tupelo Honey with his then-wife Janet "Planet" Rigsbee.

== Track listing ==
All songs by Morrison unless noted otherwise;

1. "Perfect Fit" – 4:33
2. "Russian Roulette" – 3:56
3. "Raincheck" – 5:53
4. "You Don't Know Me" (Eddy Arnold, Cindy Walker) – 4:32
5. "No Religion" – 5:14
6. "Underlying Depression" – 4:35
7. "Songwriter" – 2:50
8. "Days Like This" – 3:13
9. "I'll Never Be Free" (Bennie Benjamin, George David Weiss) – 3:37
10. "Melancholia" – 3:56
11. "Ancient Highway" – 8:53
12. "In the Afternoon" – 6:21

== Personnel ==
=== Musicians ===
- Van Morrison — vocal, acoustic guitar, electric guitar, harmonica, alto saxophone, Hammond organ
- Liam Bradley — drums on "Raincheck" and "You Don't Know Me"
- Phil Coulter — piano on "Raincheck", "You Don't Know Me" and "I'll Never Be Free"
- Geoff Dunn — drums, tambourine
- Noel Eccles — drums on "I'll Never Be Free"
- Pee Wee Ellis — tenor and alto saxophones
- Leo Green — tenor saxophone
- Matthew Holland — trumpet, flugelhorn
- James Hunter — electric guitar, background vocals on "Melancholia" and "In the Afternoon"
- Ronnie Johnson — electric guitar
- Brian Kennedy — background vocals
- Teena Lyle — recorder, piano, vibraphone, congas, background vocals
- Foggy Lyttle — electric guitar on "Raincheck", "You Don't Know Me" and "I'll Never Be Free"
- Arty McGlynn — acoustic guitar on "Raincheck"
- James McMillan — trumpet, flugelhorn on "Raincheck", "You Don't Know Me" and "Ancient Highway"
- Shana Morrison — duet vocals on "You Don't Know Me" and "I'll Never Be Free", background vocals on "Raincheck" and "Melancholia"
- Jonn Savannah — Hammond organ on "No Religion"
- Nicky Scott — bass guitar
- Kate St. John — alto saxophone, oboe

=== Production ===
- Production: Van Morrison and Phil Coulter
- Recording: Mick Glossop, Walter Samuel and Brian Masterson
- Assistant engineers: Matthew Lawrence, Greig Sangster, Avril Mackintosh, Jamie Cullum, Alastair McMillan and Meabh Flynn
- Mixing: Walter Samuel and Mick Glossop
- Mastering: Ian Cooper and Tim Young
- Horn arrangements: Pee Wee Ellis and James McMillan

== Charts ==
=== Weekly charts ===
Chart (1995)	Peak position
Australian Albums (ARIA)	16
Austrian Albums (Ö3 Austria)	49
Belgian Albums (Ultratop Flanders)	23
Dutch Albums (Album Top 100)	33
German Albums (Offizielle Top 100)	49
New Zealand Albums (RMNZ)	8
Norwegian Albums (VG-lista)	7
Scottish Albums (Official Charts)	8
Swedish Albums (Sverigetopplistan)	8
Swiss Albums (Schweizer Hitparade)	39
UK Albums (Official Charts)	5
US Billboard 200	33

=== Year-end charts ===
Chart (1995)	Position
UK Albums (OCC)	78

=== Singles ===
UK Singles Chart

Year	Single	Position
1995	"Days Like This"	65
1995	"No Religion"	54

== Certifications and sales ==
Region	Certification	Certified units/sales
Ireland (IRMA)	Platinum	15,000^{^}
New Zealand (RMNZ)	Gold	7,500^{^}
United Kingdom (BPI)	Gold	100,000^{^}
United States (RIAA)	Gold	500,000^{^}
Summaries
Worldwide	—	1,000,000
^{^} Shipments figures based on certification alone.
