= Baylen Leonard =

American British radio and TV broadcaster

Baylen Leonard (born 12 June 1973) is an American British radio and TV broadcaster specialising in country music.

== Career ==
Leonard started his radio career at BBC London in 2001 after moving in 2000 from New York City. While working at the BBC, Leonard recalls he always wanted to broadcast country music and that he passion for hosting a show playing country music helped to highlight the popularity of the genre in the UK, with Leonard, stating in an interview with IQ: “if it was a bank holiday and everybody else was away, they’d let me do a country show, which helped them cotton on to the fact that country music was a thing, so I started doing that more on Radio 2 with Bob Harris and then moved into commercial radio when Absolute and Bauer launched their commercial radio country station.”

Leonard has since worked for BBC Radio 2, BBC Radio 4, BBC Radio 5 Live, Amazing Radio, Monocle 24, Country Hits Radio, and others. He cites Bob Harris as a particular support in the establishment of his career in the UK. He also worked with Danny Baker, which even The Lady, a very traditional British magazine approved of. He is often quoted in the press regarding Country music.

In 2024, he presents six days a week on Absolute Radio Country and hosts The Country Music Talk podcast. He is also host of UK Country Radio Airplay Chart show on Absolute, which claims to be the first genre specific radio chart launched in the UK and launched in 2024.

Leonard is the creative director and booker of the country music festival The Long Road, which began in 2018 and takes place every August in Leicestershire UK. He has also hosted the Highways Festival at the Royal Albert Hall since 2023 as part of Absolute Radio Country's coverage.

He co-founded and serves as Head of Music for the digital magazine Holler.

== Awards and nominations ==
Leonard has been recognised twice International Broadcaster Of The Year by The Country Music Association (CMA), once in 2019 and again in 2021. He was also nominated for the award in 2026.

Leonard has won two British Country Music Association awards:

- UK Services to Industry 2019
- UK Best Radio Presenter 2024

Aria Award nomination 2024:

- Best Specialist Music Show - The Front Porch with Baylen Leonard - Absolute Radio Country

Music Week Awards 2024: Best Radio Show finalist - The Front Porch with Baylen Leonard - Absolute Radio Country

== Other work ==
Leonard is the annual mainstage host of The UK Americana Music Awards in Hackney London every January/ and Highways Festival every May at The Royal Albert Hall.

Leonard also does Voiceover and podcast work.

== Personal life ==
Leonard was born in Bristol Tennessee. Moved to New York City to study Musical Theatre at The American Musical and Dramatic Academy. Moved in 2000 to London where he currently lives.
