= When War Is Over =

When War is Over

Compilation album by Alan Hull
- Released: 1998
- Recorded: 1973–1975
- Genre: Folk rock, folk
- Label: NMC & BBC
- Producer: Jeff Griffin

Alan Hull chronology
Statues & Liberties (1996)	When War is Over (1998)	We Can Swing Together - Anthology (2005)

When War Is Over is a two disc compilation of Alan Hull's 1970's recordings for the BBC.

== Track listing ==
1. "Drug Song"
2. "Numbers (Travelling Band)"
3. "United States of Mind"
4. "When War is Over"
5. "Down on the Underground"
6. "Gin and Tonics All Round"
7. "One More Bottle of Wine"
8. "Dan the Plan"
9. "Dealer's Choice"
10. "Winter Song"
11. "One More Bottle of Wine"
- Tracks 1–6 for Bob Harris, Recorded: 18 July 1973; Tx: 6 August 1973. Recorded at Maida Vale.
- Tracks 6–10 for Bob Harris, Recorded: 28 November 1973; Tx: 14 January 1974. Recorded at Maida Vale.
- Track 11 for John Peel, Recorded: 22 May 1975; Tx: 29 May 1975. Recorded at Maida Vale.
1. "Peter Brophy Don't Care"
2. "The Squire"
3. "City Song"
4. "Dan the Plan"
5. "Money Game"
6. "Gin and Tonics All Round"
7. "One More Bottle of Wine"
8. "Golden Oldies"
9. "Alright on the Night"
- Tracks 1–9 in Concert 21 May 1975.
