= Goin' Down Geneva =

Song by Van Morrison

from the album Back on Top
- Released: March 9, 1999
- Recorded: 1998
- Genre: Blues rock
- Length: 4:24
- Label: Pointblank/Virgin
- Songwriter: Van Morrison
- Producer: Van Morrison

"Goin' Down Geneva" is a song written by Northern Irish singer-songwriter Van Morrison and is the opening track on his 1999 album, Back on Top.

== Recording and composition ==
The song was recorded in 1998 at the Wool Hall Studios, Beckington.

The song is blues influenced and is set in European cities (Geneva, Salzburg and Montreux) instead of the American South as typical for blues songs. The line "Last night I played a gig in Salzburg outside in the pouring rain/Flew from there to Montreux and my heart was filled with pain" refers to Morrison's European tour in 1998. He had recently played at Wiesen, Austria, near Salzburg on 4 July, and two days later he performed "Goin' Down Geneva" live for the first time at the Montreux Jazz Festival.

The lyrics of the song allude to British singer Vince Taylor, prominent in the 1960s, who lived and died in Geneva: "Vince Taylor used to live here/No one's even heard of him/Just who he was/Just where he fits in." Contrary to the lyrics biographer Brian Hinton argues that Taylor was, in fact, widely known. He comments that "David Bowie's 'Ziggy Stardust' was based on him, The Clash covered his near-hit 'Brand New Cadillac', and he recently appeared (2000) as one of Mojo's 100 essential cult heroes." Morrison's concert performances of the song usually include a section of Taylor's "Brand New Cadillac", starting off as a slow twelve-bar blues for the "Goin' Down Geneva" section and the pace immediately quickens for "Brand New Cadillac". In late 1999 and 2000 the medley also included Bob Dylan's "Rainy Day Women ♯12 & 35".

== Critical response ==
James Chrispell's allmusic review of Back on Top praises the song, calling it "a great blues cut".

Sean Elder believes Morrison sings the song "as a straight blues in the style of one of Morrison's heroes, Bobby 'Blue' Bland."

== Personnel ==
- Van Morrison – vocals, acoustic guitar
- Mick Green – acoustic and electric guitars
- Geraint Watkins – piano
- Ian Jennings – double bass
- Bobby Irwin – drums
