= The Best of Van Morrison Volume 3 =

Greatest hits album by Van Morrison
- Released: 11 June 2007
- Recorded: 1993–2005
- Length: 143:00
- Label: Manhattan EMI
- Producer: Van Morrison

Van Morrison chronology
Van Morrison at the Movies - Soundtrack Hits (2007)	The Best of Van Morrison Volume 3 (2007)	Still on Top - The Greatest Hits (2007)

Singles from The Best of Van Morrison Volume 3
- 1. "Cry For Home" Released: 4 June 2007; 2. "Blue and Green" Released: 27 August 2007

Professional ratings
Review scores
Source	Rating
Allmusic	4/5 stars
Monsters and Critics	positive
PopMatters	7/10 stars
Music Box	4/5 stars
Tom Hull	A

The Best of Van Morrison Volume 3 is a compilation album by Northern Irish singer-songwriter Van Morrison released on 11 June 2007 in the UK with a digital version released in the U.S. on iTunes Store on 12 June 2007. Manhattan/EMI Music Catalog Marketing released the CD version of the album on 19 June 2007 in the United States. This new two-disc collection of 31 tracks was compiled by Morrison himself. It offers an overview of his large volume of material since the release of The Best of Van Morrison Volume Two in 1993. The album's thirty-one tracks include previously unreleased collaborations with Tom Jones ("Cry For Home") and Bobby Bland ("Tupelo Honey") as well as duets with John Lee Hooker, B.B. King and Ray Charles. The 2003 duet with Ray Charles is "Crazy Love", a song originally recorded on Morrison's 1970 album Moondance. "Blue and Green" was previously donated to be used on the charity album Hurricane Relief: Come Together Now, which raised money for relief efforts intended for Gulf Coast victims devastated by hurricane Katrina. The duet with Tom Jones, "Cry For Home", was taken from the same recording sessions that produced the "Sometimes We Cry" duet between the two artists, which featured on Jones' successful album Reload. "Cry for Home" was released as a single on 4 June 2007 in the UK, and was followed by "Blue and Green" on 27 August.

On 18 June 2007 the album was listed as No. 23 on the UK Music Charts on the Official UK Top 75 Albums.

== Track listing ==
=== Disc one ===
1. "Cry for Home" (with Tom Jones) (previously unreleased) – 4:10
2. "Too Long In Exile" – 5:08
3. "Gloria" (with John Lee Hooker) – 5:19
4. "Help Me" (with Junior Wells) (Live at the Masonic Auditorium) – 6:25
5. "Lonely Avenue/4 O'Clock in the Morning (Try for Sleep)/Sooner or Later/When Will I Become a Man?/You Give Me Nothing but the Blues/Lonely Avenue" (with Jimmy Witherspoon, Candy Dulfer & Jim Hunter) (Live at the Masonic Auditorium) – 7:54
6. "Days Like This – 3:14
7. "Ancient Highway" – 8:52
8. "Raincheck" – 5:53
9. "Moondance" (Jazz version) – 4:56
10. "Centerpiece" (Live at Ronnie Scott's) (with Georgie Fame & Annie Ross) – 3:16
11. "That's Life" (Live at The Point) – 4:30
12. "Benediction" (remix) (with Georgie Fame & Ben Sidran) – 3:01
13. "The Healing Game" (remix) – 5:17
14. "I Don't Want to Go On Without You" (with Jim Hunter) – 3:27

=== Disc two ===
1. "Shenandoah" (with The Chieftains) – 3:53
2. "Precious Time" – 3:08
3. "Back on Top" (remix) – 4:20
4. "When the Leaves Come Falling Down" – 5:38
5. "Lost John" (Live at Whitla Hall) – 2:57
6. "Tupelo Honey" (with Bobby "Blue" Bland) (previously unreleased) – 3:37
7. "Meet Me in the Indian Summer" (Orchestral Version) (Remix) – 3:31
8. "Georgia on My Mind" – 5:37
9. "Hey Mr. DJ" – 3:49
10. "Steal My Heart Away" – 4:11
11. "Crazy Love" (with Ray Charles) – 3:43
12. "Once in a Blue Moon" – 3:30
13. "Little Village" – 4:30
14. "Blue and Green" – 5:41
15. "Sittin' on Top of the World" (with Carl Perkins) – 3:20
16. "Early in the Morning" (with B.B. King) – 4:50
17. "Stranded" – 5:37
