= Precious Time (Van Morrison song) =

Single by Van Morrison

from the album Back on Top
- A-side: "Precious Time"
- B-side: "Jackie Wilson Said"/ "Call Me Up in Dreamland" (UK)
- Released: 22 February 1999
- Recorded: 1998, Wool Hall Studios, Beckington
- Genre: R&B
- Length: 3:45
- Label: Polydor
- Songwriter: Van Morrison
- Producer: Van Morrison

Van Morrison singles chronology
"Rough God Goes Riding" (1997)	"Precious Time" (1999)	"Back on Top" (1999)

"Precious Time" is a popular song written by Northern Irish singer-songwriter Van Morrison and recorded on his 1999 album, Back on Top. It was released as a single in the UK and charted at No. 36. Since first recording it, Morrison has played it in concert 574 times from March 1998 until June 2008, making it one of his most frequently performed songs.

== Recording and composition ==
It was recorded in 1998 at The Wool Hall Studios in Beckington with Walter Samuel as engineer.

"Precious Time" has a happy upbeat melody and introspective lyrics about the quick passing of time:

Precious time is slipping away
You know you're only king for a day
It doesn't matter to which God you pray
Precious time is slipping away

== Other releases ==
A live performance version from Morrison's appearance at the Austin City Limits Festival on 15 September 2006, was included on the limited edition album, Live at Austin City Limits Festival. In 2007, this song was included on the compilation album, The Best of Van Morrison Volume 3 and a remastered version of this song is included on another 2007 compilation album, Still on Top - The Greatest Hits.

== Personnel ==
- Van Morrison – vocals
- Geraint Watkins – Hammond organ
- Mick Green – electric and acoustic guitars
- Ian Jennings – double bass
- Bobby Irwin – drums
- Pee Wee Ellis – tenor and baritone saxophones
- Brian Kennedy – backing vocals
