= Rudge, Somerset =

Hamlet in Somerset, England

Coordinates: 51.268°N 02.249°W

Rudge
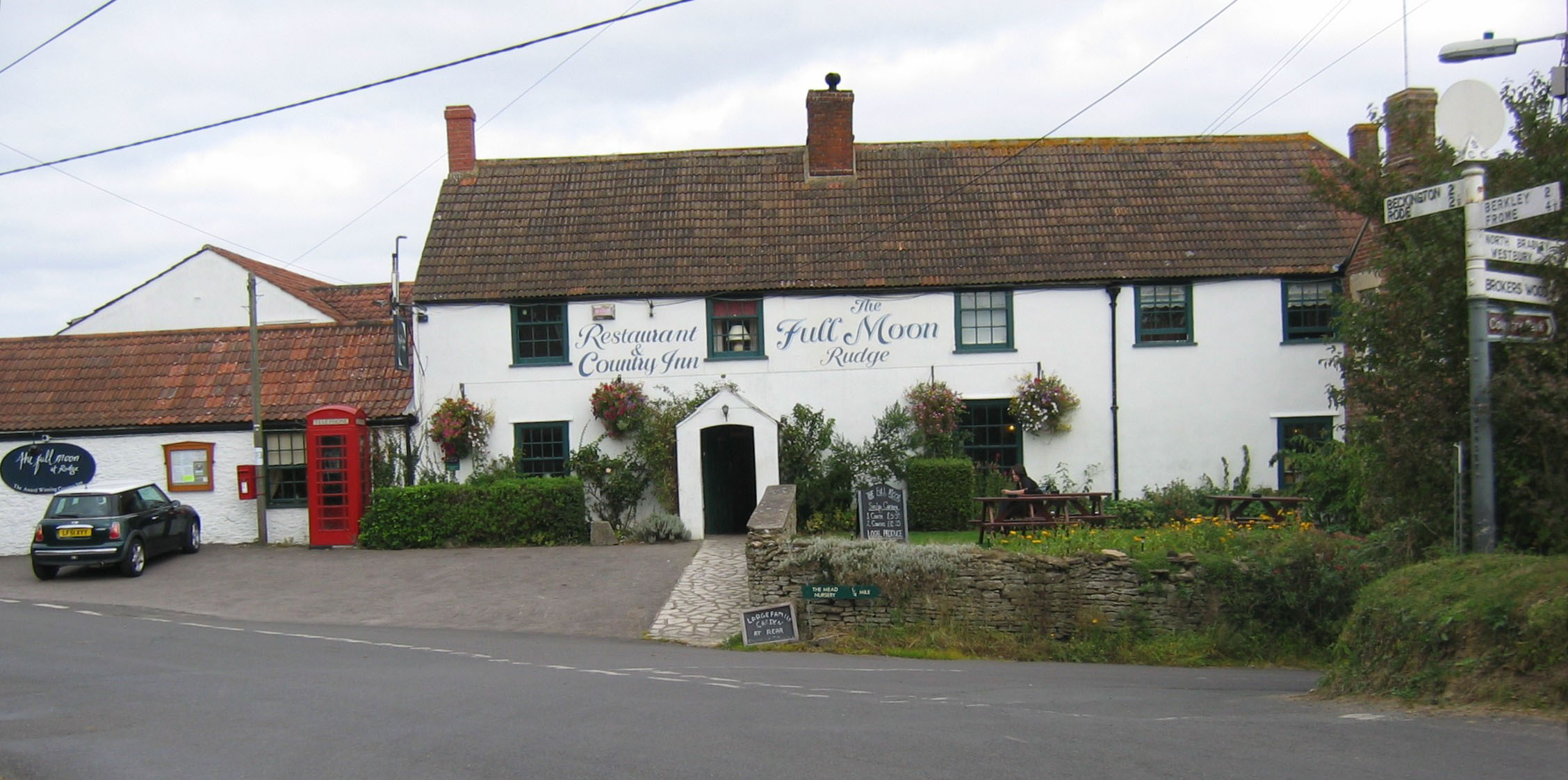
- Full Moon Inn at the central crossroads

- Location within Somerset
- Population: 100
- OS grid reference: ST828517
- Unitary authority: Somerset Council
- Ceremonial county: Somerset
- Region: South West
- Country: England
- Sovereign state: United Kingdom
- Post town: FROME
- Postcode district: BA11
- Dialling code: 01373
- Police: Avon and Somerset
- Fire: Devon and Somerset
- Ambulance: South Western
- UK Parliament: Frome and East Somerset

Rudge is a hamlet in the civil parish of Beckington in the county of Somerset, England. Its nearest town is Frome.

== Location ==
The hamlet is located 2.5 miles (4 km) west of Westbury, Wiltshire, and 1.5 miles (2.4 km) east of A36 road going from Bath to Warminster.

The neighbouring villages are Rode, Southwick, Dilton Marsh and Beckington.

== Amenities ==
The Full Moon pub has developed from a small pub, now having letting rooms and a restaurant.

Since 1946, a public telephone and kiosk were placed outside the pub. It is now an Information Point [RIP] and mini book exchange.

== History ==
The Old Manor House, sometimes known as Rudgehill Farm, was built in the early 17th century and refronted in 1692.

The Baptist Chapel at Rudge was founded at the beginning of the 19th century.

The Methodist Chapel in the centre of Rudge, which was built in 1839. It is now a private house.

The electricity supply to Rudge was completed by 1950, and the piped water supply was laid on in 1954.

== Notable people ==
The English poet Samuel Daniel settled at Rudge and died here in 1619; he is buried in the nearby St George's Church, Beckington.
