= 7 Wishes (Shana Morrison album) =

Studio album by Shana Morrison
- Released: April 2, 2002
- Genre: Pop, blues, country
- Label: Vanguard
- Producer: Steve Buckingham

Shana Morrison chronology
Everybody's Angel (2000)	7 Wishes (2002)	That's Who I Am (2006)

Professional ratings
Review scores
Source	Rating
music-reviewer.com	link
The Music Box	link

7 Wishes is the third studio album recorded by American singer-songwriter Shana Morrison. Shana had signed with Vanguard Records in 2001 and this album was released in 2002. It received favorable reviews and air play nationally. Two of the songs on the album were written by her father, northern Irish singer-songwriter Van Morrison. Her father joins in with her on the last verse of "Sometimes We Cry" with harmonica and vocals.

== Track listing ==
No.	Title	Length
1.	"I Spy" (Jeff Penning, Michael Lunn, Shana Morrison)	3:46
2.	"Smoke in Bed" (Clif Magness, Marc Jordan, S. Morrison)	4:41
3.	"7 Wishes" (Chris Collins, S. Morrison)	3:47
4.	"A Song for the Broken" (David Gionfriddo, S. Morrison, Stephen Gordon)	3:39
5.	"Mother" (Magness, S. Morrison)	4:14
6.	"Would I Could" (Collins, S. Morrison)	2:48
7.	"Day After Yes" (Collins, Mark McCartney, Robert Powell, Scoop McGuire, S. Morrison)	4:19
8.	"Naked in the Jungle" (Van Morrison)	5:08
9.	"St. Christopher" (S. Morrison)	5:34
10.	"Cherry on Top" (Collins, McCartney, Powell, McGuire, S. Morrison)	5:02
11.	"Sometimes We Cry" (V. Morrison)	4:42
12.	"God Must Love Me" (Kim Patton-Johnston, S. Morrison)	3:47
13.	"Connection" (Narada Michael Walden, S. Morrison)	4:25

== Personnel ==
- Shana Morrison — lead and background vocals
- Van Morrison — harmonica, vocals
- Steve Buckingham — acoustic, electric & baritone guitar, dulcimer, tambourine
- Reggie Young — electric guitar
- Chris Collins – electric & acoustic guitar, sitar, background vocals
- Kenny Greenberg — electric & acoustic guitar
- Bryan Sutton — acoustic guitar, mandolin
- Kim Patton-Johnston — acoustic guitar background vocals
- Sonny Landreth — slide guitar
- Robert Powell – sitar
- Michael Rhodes — bass
- Matt Rollings — organ, Hammond B-3 organ
- Robert Bailey — background vocals
- Heidi Campbell – background vocals
- Vicki Hampton – background vocals
- Chris Mosher – programming
- Shawn Pelton — drums, drum programming, spoken word
- Shannon Forrest — drums
