= The Abbey, Beckington =

Building in Beckington, Somerset, England

Coordinates: 51°15′51″N 2°17′15″W

The Abbey
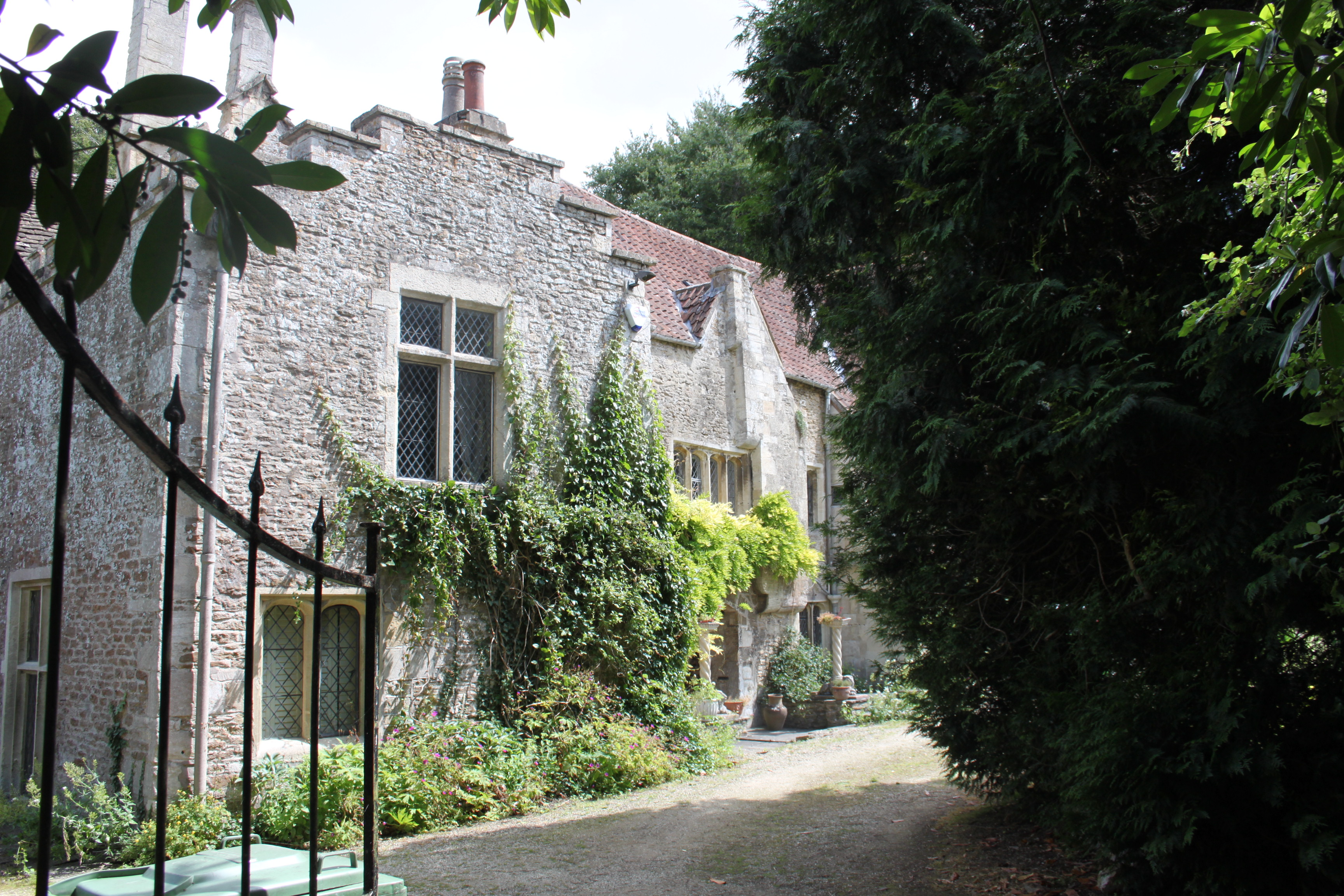
- Interactive map of the The Abbey area

General information
- Location: Beckington, England
- Construction started: 1502

The Abbey, Beckington in Beckington, Somerset, England is a historic building that was founded as a monastic grange and also used as a college for priests; the building was begun in 1502, but after the Dissolution of the Monasteries it became a private house. It was altered in the early 17th century with a new front and a sumptuous barrel vaulted plaster ceiling, and also altered in the 19th century. The house was used as a school, restaurant and dance hall in 19th and 20th centuries but has now been restored as three houses: the most important plaster ceiling is in the house now known as "The Abbey".

== History ==
Although never an abbey, the site may have been in use from about 1156, and by 1347 seems to have been used as a college for priests. It was earlier called Beckington Grange. The estate included 185 acres of farmland and may have been am abbey grange connected with the abbey at Wells. There was also a tithe barn, a malt house, a fish pond, corn and cloth mills.

The present building seems to have been founded as an Augustinian hospital in 1502. The monks were attached to Bath Abbey. although previously connected to Wells Cathedral. This may reflect the changes in the seat of the Bishop between the two sites during the 12th and 13th centuries. Substantial alterations took place around 1620, additions were made in the nineteenth century when a flat roofed extension was added. The house was used as a school, restaurant and dance hall in 19th and 20th centuries but has now been restored as individual houses: the plaster ceiling is in that known as The Abbey. It was designated as a Grade II* listed building on 11 March 1968.

== Architecture ==
The two-storey building was laid out as a cross passage house with a solar wing. The house is constructed of rubble stone with stone tile roofs. The chimney stacks are of ashlar masonry with moulded caps. The building has a U-plan with a cross passage hall, and consists of two storeys with attics above. The front has two, four and one bay respectively, with the projecting wings gabled. The large windows have stone mullions and relieving arches. The doorway is to the left of the central section and has double doors with a moulded stone surround. There is a single storey extension with a flat roof to the left, added in the nineteenth century. The parapet has coping between the gables.

The interior has important features. In the house now known as "The Abbey", the sumptuous barrel-vaulted, coved plaster ceiling on the first floor has five pendants and elaborate strap work. The central rose decoration radiates with pomegranates and fleur-de-lis decorations. Another upstairs room has a flat ribbed plaster ceiling and the staircase has linenfold wainscoting panelling. In "The Grange", there are more elaborately decorated plaster ceilings, linenfold panelling in the rear passageway and a plastered archway with the heads of satyrs. There are other important features including a wide fireplace with an arched lintel on the ground floor.

The large complex of buildings is separated from the road by a 4 metres (13 ft) high stone boundary wall, running for 100 metres (330 ft) with gate piers and gates. Large trees in the grounds include conifers and cypresses.
