= A Better Man (album) =

Studio album by Brian Kennedy
- Released: 4 October 1996 (Ireland); 7 October 1996 (UK)
- Labels: BMG; RCA; 19
- Producer: Stephen Lipson

Brian Kennedy chronology
The Great War of Words (1990)	A Better Man (1996)	Now That I Know What I Want (1999)

Professional ratings
Review scores
Source	Rating
AllMusic	3/5 stars

A Better Man is the second studio album by Irish singer Brian Kennedy, released in 1996. It debuted at number one on the Irish Albums Chart.

Three singles taken from the album reached both the Irish Top 20 and the UK Top 40: "A Better Man" (Ireland No. 6; UK No. 28), "Life, Love & Happiness" (Ireland No. 16; UK No. 27) and a cover of a song originally recorded by World Party, "Put the Message in the Box" (Ireland No. 18; UK No. 37).

== Track listing ==
No.	Title	Writer(s)	Length
1.	"A Better Man"	Brian Kennedy; Phil Pickett; Jon Lind	4:04
2.	"For One Kiss"	Kennedy; Peter-John Vettese	4:45
3.	"Won't You Take Me Home"	Kennedy; Andy Hill	4:55
4.	"No Other Words"	Kennedy; Vettese	3:51
5.	"And So I Will Wait for You"	Simon Climie; Denis Morgan	4:10
6.	"Life, Love & Happiness"	Kennedy; Vettese	4:29
7.	"The Oldest Dream in the World"	Kennedy; Calum MacColl	4:02
8.	"Put the Message in the Box"	Karl Wallinger	4:04
9.	"By the Mountain Road"	Kennedy; MacColl	3:19
10.	"Ghost Music"	Kennedy; Boo Hewerdine	4:46
11.	"Wish Me Well"	Paul Buchanan	4:23

== Personnel ==
Adapted from the album's liner notes.

Musicians

- Brian Kennedy – lead vocals (all tracks), harmonies (tracks 2, 4, 6), bouzouki (track 2), guitars (track 7)
- Teddy Borowiecki – accordion (track 9)
- Liam Bradley – drums (track 8), harmonies (track 8)
- Simon Climie – keyboards (track 5)
- Danny Cummings – percussion (track 8)
- James Hallawell – keyboards (track 8), harmonies (track 8)
- Boo Hewerdine – guitar (track 10)
- Andy Hill – keyboards (track 3)
- Luís Jardim – percussion (tracks 2–7, 9–11)
- Stephen Lipson – keyboards (tracks 1, 5, 7), guitars (tracks 1, 4, 5), bass (tracks 1, 2, 7, 8, 10), dulcimer (track 5), percussion (track 10), harmonies (track 7)
- London Community Gospel Choir – choir (track 6)
- Calum MacColl – guitars (tracks 1–3, 5–9, 11), keyboards (track 9), mandolin (track 1), zither (track 2), harmonies (tracks 7–9)
- Eddi Reader – harmonies (track 2)
- Andy Richards – keyboards (tracks 1, 3, 7)
- Kate St John – oboe (tracks 7, 10), cor anglais (tracks 7, 11)
- Peter-John Vettese – keyboards (tracks 1–7, 9–11), melodica (track 4), drums (track 1), harmonies (tracks 2, 4, 6)
- Gavyn Wright – violin (track 1)

Production

- Andy Hill – programming (track 3)
- Luís Jardim – programming (track 5)
- Stephen Lipson – production (all tracks), programming (tracks 1–6, 9–11)
- Calum MacColl – programming (track 9)
- Peter-John Vettese – programming (tracks 2, 4, 6, 10, 11)
- Engineered by Heff Moraes at the Aquarium
- Photography by Norman Watson
- Designed by Bill Smith Studio, London

== Charts ==
Chart (1996)	Peak position
Ireland Albums (IFPI/IRMA)	1
Scotland Albums (OCC)	11
UK Albums (OCC)	19

== Certifications ==
Region	Certification	Certified units/sales
Ireland (IRMA)	3× Platinum	45,000
United Kingdom (BPI)	Silver	60,000
