= These Days (Brian Kennedy song) =

Single by Brian Kennedy featuring Ronan Keating

from the album Now That I Know What I Want
- Released: September 1999
- Label: Sony

Brian Kennedy singles chronology
"Put the Message in the Box" (1997)	"These Days" (1999)	"Playin' With My Heart" (1999)

Ronan Keating singles chronology
"When You Say Nothing at All" (1999)	"These Days" (1999)	"Life Is a Rollercoaster" (2000)

"These Days" is a song recorded by Irish singer-songwriter Brian Kennedy, featuring Ronan Keating. It was released in September 1999 as the lead single from Kennedy's third studio album, Now That I Know What I Want. "These Days" peaked at number 4 on the Irish singles chart.

In Irish magazine VIP, in November 1999, Keating said, "Brian and myself are old friends and we go back a long way now. It was nothing but a pleasure to work with someone as talented as Brian."

== Track listing ==
CD single

1. "These Days" - 4:04
2. "I'll Be Waiting" - 3:28
3. "Under Irish Stars" - 3:56
4. "Interview with Brian Kennedy and Ronan Keating" - 3:29

== Charts ==
Chart (1999)	Peak position
Ireland (IRMA)	4
