= BBC Music Jazz =

- United Kingdom
- Broadcast area: United Kingdom; available worldwide through the internet
- Frequency: DAB: 12B

Programming
- Language: English
- Format: Jazz

Ownership
- Owner: BBC
- Sister stations: BBC Radio 2

History
- First air date: 12 November 2015; 10 years ago
- Last air date: 14 November 2016; 9 years ago

Links
- Website: www.bbc.co.uk/programmes/b06jswzy

BBC Music Jazz (a British national radio station) was a temporary pop-up Digital Audio Broadcasting (DAB) service which was a collaboration between BBC Radio, Jazz FM and The EFG Jazz London Festival.

The service ran from Thursday, 12 November 2015 until Sunday, 15 November 2015. The BBC Music Jazz event marked the broadcaster's first major collaboration with a commercial rival. BBC Music Jazz was available via Digital Audio Broadcasting, online on the BBC Music Jazz's official website, or via the BBC Radio iPlayer app. The service was unavailable on digital television.

The station returned on Thursday 10 November 2016 at 10 am, running round the clock until Monday 14 November at 10 am.

== Presenters ==
- Guy Barker
- Craig Charles
- Don Cheadle
- Jamie Cullum
- Robert Elms
- Leo Green
- Mary Anne Hobbs
- Jools Holland
- Hardeep Singh Kohli
- Stewart Lee
- Claire Martin
- Ana Matronic
- Cerys Matthews
- Helen Mayhew
- Colin Murray
- Laura Mvula
- Michael Parkinson
- Gilles Peterson
- Gregory Porter
- Geoffrey Smith
- Moira Stuart
- Clare Teal
- Steve Wright
- Will Young

== See also ==
- BBC Radio 2 Country
