= BBC Radio 2 Country =

United Kingdom
- Broadcast area: United Kingdom; available worldwide through the internet
- Frequency: DAB: 12B

Programming
- Language: English
- Format: Country, Americana, Gospel, Hot AC, Indie Music, Infotainment

Ownership
- Owner: BBC
- Sister stations: BBC Radio 2

History
- First air date: 5 March 2015; 10 years ago
- Last air date: 12 March 2017; 8 years ago

Links
- Website: www.bbc.co.uk/programmes/p02jxzfq

BBC Radio 2 Country was a pop-up DAB service from the BBC which launched at 12:00 on Thursday 5 March 2015. The station covered the Country2Country Festival and was on air for the festival's duration.

On its debut, the station broadcast for twelve hours each day until Sunday 8 March 2015. It was relaunched for the 2016 festival, held between 10 March 2016 and 13 March 2016, and again from 9 March 2017 to 12 March 2017.

The station did not return after the 2017 festival and has not returned since.

== Presenters ==
2015	2016	2017
Bob Harris	Bob Harris	Bob Harris
Sara Cox	Sara Cox	Sara Cox
Steve Wright	Steve Wright	Steve Wright
Baylen Leonard	Baylen Leonard	Baylen Leonard
Sally Boazman	Sally Boazman	Colin Murray
Patrick Kielty	Patrick Kielty	Patrick Kielty
Paul Gambaccini	Paul Gambaccini	Storme Warren
Cerys Matthews	Cerys Matthews	Vanessa Feltz
Alex Lester	Alex Lester	Mark Radcliffe
Ricky Ross	Ricky Ross	Ricky Ross
Trisha Yearwood	Gretchen Peters	Reba McEntire
Wynonna Judd	Paul Sexton	Paul Sexton
Kristian Bush	Don Henley	Alison Krauss
Suzy Bogguss	Little Big Town	The Shires
Johnnie Walker	Hillary Scott	Marty Stuart
Tony Blackburn	Ken Bruce	Ken Bruce
Sir Terry Wogan	Liza Tarbuck	Trevor Nelson
Helen Macpherson	Jeremy Vine	Susan Calman
	Michael Ball	Leo Green
	Simon Mayo	Simon Mayo
		Chris Country

== Special Programmes ==
A number of famous country singers have presented one-off shows for Radio 2 Country or have given hour-long interviews to be broadcast on the station:

- Live from Country to Country - presented by Bob Harris, Jo Whiley, Patrick Kielty, Alex Lester, Paul Sexton, Baylen Leonard and Bobbie Pryor (2015–present)
- C2C Unplugged - presented by Bob Harris (2015–16)
- Patrick Kielty meets Garth Brooks (2015)
- Bob Harris meets Miranda Lambert (2015)
- Johnnie Walker meets Dolly (2015)
- Taking back the country - presented by Wynonna Judd (2015)
- Country Duos - presented by Kristian Bush of Sugarland (2015)
- Songwriters - presented by Trisha Yearwood (2015)
- Classic Country - presented by Suzy Bogguss (2015)
- Loretta Lynn in conversation - presented by Bob Harris (2016)
- Gospel Hour - presented by Hillary Scott of Lady Antebellum (2016) and Reba McEntire (2017)
- On the road with Little Big Town (2016)
- Sad songs make me happy - presented by Gretchen Peters (2016)
- Country Playlist - presented by The Shires (2017)
- Bluegrass and beyond - presented by Alison Krauss (2017)
- Country Pickers - presented by Marty Stuart (2017)

== See also ==
- BBC Music Jazz
- BBC Radio 2 50s
