= The Healing Game =

Studio album by Van Morrison
- Released: 3 March 1997
- Recorded: 1996
- Studios: Westland (Dublin, Ireland); Windmill Lane (Dublin, Ireland)
- Genre: Folk rock
- Length: 53:38
- Label: Polydor
- Producer: Van Morrison

Van Morrison chronology
Tell Me Something: The Songs of Mose Allison (1996)	The Healing Game (1997)	The Philosopher's Stone (1998)

Singles from The Healing Game
- 1. "The Healing Game" Released: 10 February 1997; 2. "Rough God Goes Riding" Released: May 1997

The Healing Game is the twenty-sixth studio album by Northern Irish singer-songwriter Van Morrison, released in 1997 by Polydor. It reached the Top Ten in four countries, and the Top Twenty in three more. Following two overtly jazz albums, it saw Morrison adding blues and a pop sensibility. It is the only album recorded after 1980 which Rolling Stone judged to be among his ten best, calling it "a clear highlight of his mid-period discography".

== Recording history ==
The album was recorded in Dublin, Ireland, in 1996. The cover shows Morrison with Haji Ahkba.

== Songs ==
The title song is about the tradition of Belfast street singing. Van Morrison told Q magazine, "People find it incredible when I tell them that people used to sing and play music in the street", adding that "there's a whole oral tradition that's disappeared." "Rough God Goes Riding" is taken from a W. B. Yeats poem "The Second Coming" with the "rough beast" from the Apocalypse, and features Leo Green's saxophone following Morrison's voice. In "Waiting Game" Morrison is "the brother of the snake", which Brian Hinton says refers to both his lost friend Jim Morrison (known for writing about "The Lizard King"), and the Garden of Eden. "Piper at the Gates of Dawn" echoes the children's book, The Wind in the Willows, and features Paddy Moloney on uilleann pipes with Phil Coulter on piano. On "Burning Ground", Morrison references his childhood when jute was shipped to Belfast from India.

== Reception ==
Professional ratings
Review scores
Source	Rating
AllMusic	3.5/5 stars
NME	3/10

Music critic Greil Marcus was impressed, writing that, "[like] the rough god he sings about, Morrison is astride each incident in the music, each pause in a greater story," but advises close listening, as "often the most revealing moments —the moments that reveal the shape of a world, a point of view, an argument about life — are at the margins." The NME's John Mulvey said that "only the mantric repetitions and solemn horns of the title track stand comparison with his past glories", and concluded by calling it "a resounding flop."

Reviewing the 2019 reissue, All About Jazz asserted that "Healing Game is one of most complete personal and musical statements in Van Morrison's lengthy discography." It saw the artist "revisit the jazz and rhythm and blues-inspired style that influenced his earliest work", having "assembled a killer new band"

== Reissues ==
The 2008 remastered version of the album contains a bonus track: "At the End of the Day", which was the a B-side of "Rough God Goes Riding", the third single of the album, which itself was listed as one of the standout tracks from Van Morrison's six album reissue series. The album was reissued again in 2019 as a triple CD, with bonus material from the studio sessions and Van Morrison's performance at the Montreux Jazz Festival on 17 July 1997. Disc two featured collaborations with John Lee Hooker, Carl Perkins and British skiffle star Lonnie Donegan.

== Track listing ==
All songs by Van Morrison, except where noted.

No.	Title	Length
1.	"Rough God Goes Riding"	6:19
2.	"Fire in the Belly"	6:34
3.	"This Weight"	4:37
4.	"Waiting Game"	5:56
5.	"Piper at the Gates of Dawn"	3:53
6.	"Burning Ground"	5:38
7.	"It Once Was My Life"	5:10
8.	"Sometimes We Cry"	5:14
9.	"If You Love Me"	5:01
10.	"The Healing Game"	5:16

2008 reissue bonus track
No.	Title	Length
11.	"At the End of the Day"	4:32

=== 2019 deluxe edition ===
Disc one: The Original Album... Plus
No.	Title	Length
1.	"Rough God Goes Riding"	6:19
2.	"Fire in the Belly"	6:34
3.	"This Weight"	4:37
4.	"Waiting Game"	5:56
5.	"Piper at the Gates of Dawn"	3:53
6.	"Burning Ground"	5:38
7.	"It Once Was My Life""	5:10
8.	"Sometimes We Cry"	5:14
9.	"If You Love Me"	5:01
10.	"The Healing Game"	5:16
11.	"Look at What the Good People Done"	5:42
12.	"At the End of the Day"	4:30
13.	"The Healing Game" (single version)	4:28
14.	"Full Force Gale '96"	3:34
15.	"Saint Dominic's Preview" (live in Temple Bar, Dublin, April 1996)	6:45

Disc two: Sessions and Collaborations
No.	Title	Length
1.	"The Healing Game" (alternate version)	7:41
2.	"Fire in the Belly" (alternate version)	5:25
3.	"Didn't He Ramble" (written by Hattie Bolten)	6:11
4.	"The Healing Game" (jazz version)	5:16
5.	"Sometimes We Cry" (full length version)	8:23
6.	"Mule Skinner Blues" (written by Jimmie Rodgers and George Vaughan)	4:32
7.	"A Kiss to Build a Dream On" (written by Bert Kalmar, Harry Ruby and Oscar Hammerstein II)	4:29
8.	"Don't Look Back" (with John Lee Hooker; written by John Lee Hooker)	6:42
9.	"The Healing Game" (with John Lee Hooker)	5:09
10.	"Boppin' the Blues" (with Carl Perkins; written by Carl Perkins and Howard "Curley" Griffin)	3:58
11.	"Matchbox" (with Carl Perkins; written by Carl Perkins)	4:07
12.	"Sittin' on Top of the World" (with Carl Perkins; written by Walter Vinson and Lonnie Chatmon)	3:19
13.	"My Angel" (with Carl Perkins; written by Van Morrison and Carl Perkins)	6:08
14.	"All by Myself" (with Carl Perkins)	3:28
15.	"Mule Skinner Blues" (with Lonnie Donegan; written by Jimmie Rodgers and George Vaughan)	4:34

Disc three: Live at Montreux 17 July 1997
No.	Title	Length
1.	"Rough God Goes Riding"	5:40
2.	"Foreign Window"	3:54
3.	"Tore Down a la Rimbaud"	3:18
4.	"Vanlose Stairway / Trans-Euro Train"	4:56
5.	"A Fool for You" (written by Ray Charles)	3:17
6.	"Sometimes We Cry"	5:31
7.	"It Once Was My Life"	5:02
8.	"I'm Not Feeling It Anymore"	7:24
9.	"This Weight"	4:21
10.	"Who Can I Turn To (When Nobody Needs Me)" (written by Anthony Newley)	4:05
11.	"Fire in the Belly"	5:59
12.	"Tupelo Honey / Why Must I Always Explain?"	6:50
13.	"The Healing Game"	5:51
14.	"See Me Through / Soldier of Fortune / Thank You (Falettinme Be Mice Elf Agin) / Burning Ground" ("Thank You" written by Sly Stone)	13:32

== Personnel ==
=== Musicians ===
- Van Morrison – vocals, acoustic guitar, harmonica
- John Lee Hooker: vocals on Don't Look Back and The Healing Game (disc 2 version)
- Carl Perkins: vocals on Boppin' the Blues, Matchbox, Sitting on Top of the World, My Angel and All by Myself
- Lonnie Donegan: vocals on Mule Skinner Blues
- Ronnie Johnson – electric guitar
- Peter O'Hanlon – dobro on "Piper at the Gates of Dawn" and "At the End of the Day"
- Nicky Scott – bass guitar
- Alec Dankworth – double bass
- Robin Aspland – piano
- Phil Coulter – piano on "Piper at the Gates of Dawn" and "At the End of the Day"
- Georgie Fame – Hammond organ, background vocals
- Pee Wee Ellis – soprano and baritone saxophones, background vocals
- Leo Green – tenor saxophone, background vocals
- Haji Ahkba – flugelhorn
- Paddy Moloney – uilleann pipes and tin whistle on "Piper at the Gates of Dawn"
- Matt Holland – trumpet, background vocals
- Brian Kennedy – background vocals
- Katie Kissoon – background vocals
- Geoff Dunn – drums, percussion
- Ralph Salmins – percussion

=== Production ===
- Production: Van Morrison
- Recording: Walter Samuel, Enda Walsh ("Piper at the Gates of Dawn", "At the End of the Day")
- Assistant engineering: David Slevin, Ciaran Cahill, Matthew Lawrence and Neil Douglas
- Mixing: Walter Samuel
- Technical support: David Conroy
- Mastering: Tim Young
- Art direction and design: Matt Curtis @ Abrahams Pants
- Photography: Paul Cox

== Charts ==
=== Weekly charts ===
Weekly chart performance for original release
Chart (1997)	Peak position
Australian Albums (ARIA)	17
Austrian Albums (Ö3 Austria)	43
Belgian Albums (Ultratop Flanders)	42
Dutch Albums (Album Top 100)	29
European Albums (European Top 100 Albums)	14
German Albums (Offizielle Top 100)	28
New Zealand Albums (RMNZ)	6
Norwegian Albums (VG-lista)	8
Swedish Albums (Sverigetopplistan)	13
Swiss Albums (Schweizer Hitparade)	43
UK Albums (Official Charts)	10
US Billboard 200	32

Weekly chart performance for reissue
Chart (2019)	Peak position
Austrian Albums (Ö3 Austria)	18
Belgian Albums (Ultratop Flanders)	78
Dutch Albums (Album Top 100)	45
German Albums (Offizielle Top 100)	12
Swiss Albums (Schweizer Hitparade)	43
Italian Albums (FIMI)	82
Spanish Albums (Promusicae)	10
UK Album Sales (Official Charts)	29
UK Americana Albums (Official Charts)	4
US Americana/Folk Albums (Billboard)	20

=== Year-end charts ===
Annual chart rankings
Chart (1997)	Rank
Norwegian Albums (VG-lista)	99

== Certifications ==
Region	Certification	Certified units/sales
New Zealand (RMNZ)	Gold	7,500^{^}
United Kingdom (BPI)	Silver	60,000^{^}
^{^} Shipments figures based on certification alone.
