= Shana Morrison =

Irish-American musician (born 1970)

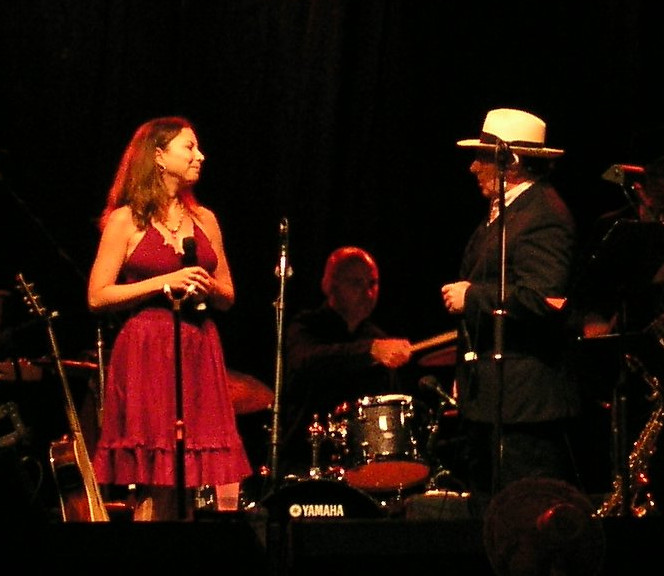
- Shana Morrison performing with father, Van Morrison in Berkeley, California, 2006

Background information
- Born: April 7, 1970 (age 56)
- Origin: Kingston, New York
- Genres: Folk rock
- Occupation: Singer-songwriter
- Years active: 1994–present
- Label: various
- Website: ShanaMorrison.com

Shana Caledonia Morrison (born April 7, 1970) is an American singer-songwriter and the daughter of Northern Irish singer-songwriter Van Morrison and his ex-wife, Janet Rigsbee Minto.

== Early life ==
Morrison was born in Cambridge, Massachusetts and grew up in Marin County, California, and was raised spending time in the separate homes of her parents, who had divorced when she was three years old. She also worked weekends in the record shop of her paternal grandparents, George and Violet, after they moved to California from Northern Ireland when Morrison was a toddler. She learned her first songs from her grandmother who would often sing to her all afternoon.

== Musical career ==
Morrison sang in musicals and choirs in high school and college. After graduating with a business degree from Pepperdine University in 1993, she went on the road touring with her father and his band for a year. She duetted with him on his 1994 album A Night in San Francisco, and 1995's Days Like This. She then returned to Marin County and formed her own band, Caledonia.

She has an established music career of her own and has toured regularly with her band since 1996. Her first album, Caledonia, was released on her own Belfast Violet Records in 1998 and licensed for distribution by Monster Music in 1999. Her second album, Everybody's Angel, is a collaboration with slide guitarist Roy Rogers. Her third album, 7 Wishes, was recorded in 2002 with the Vanguard Records label and is produced by Steve Buckingham. She released That's Who I Am, which was produced by Morrison herself on her own label, Belfast Violet Records, in 2006. On March 4, 2010, Morrison released her latest album, Joyride. Like her previous release, the new album is on the Belfast Violet label, with Jim Lauderdale contributing vocals for a duet on "He Won't Send Roses".

== Discography ==
- Caledonia (1998) Monster Music
- Everybody's Angel (2000) Roshan Records
- 7 Wishes (2002) Vanguard Records
- That's Who I Am (2006) Belfast Violet Records
- Joyride (2010) Belfast Violet Records
