= Bob Harris (radio presenter) =

English retired broadcaster (born 1946)

Bob Harris OBE
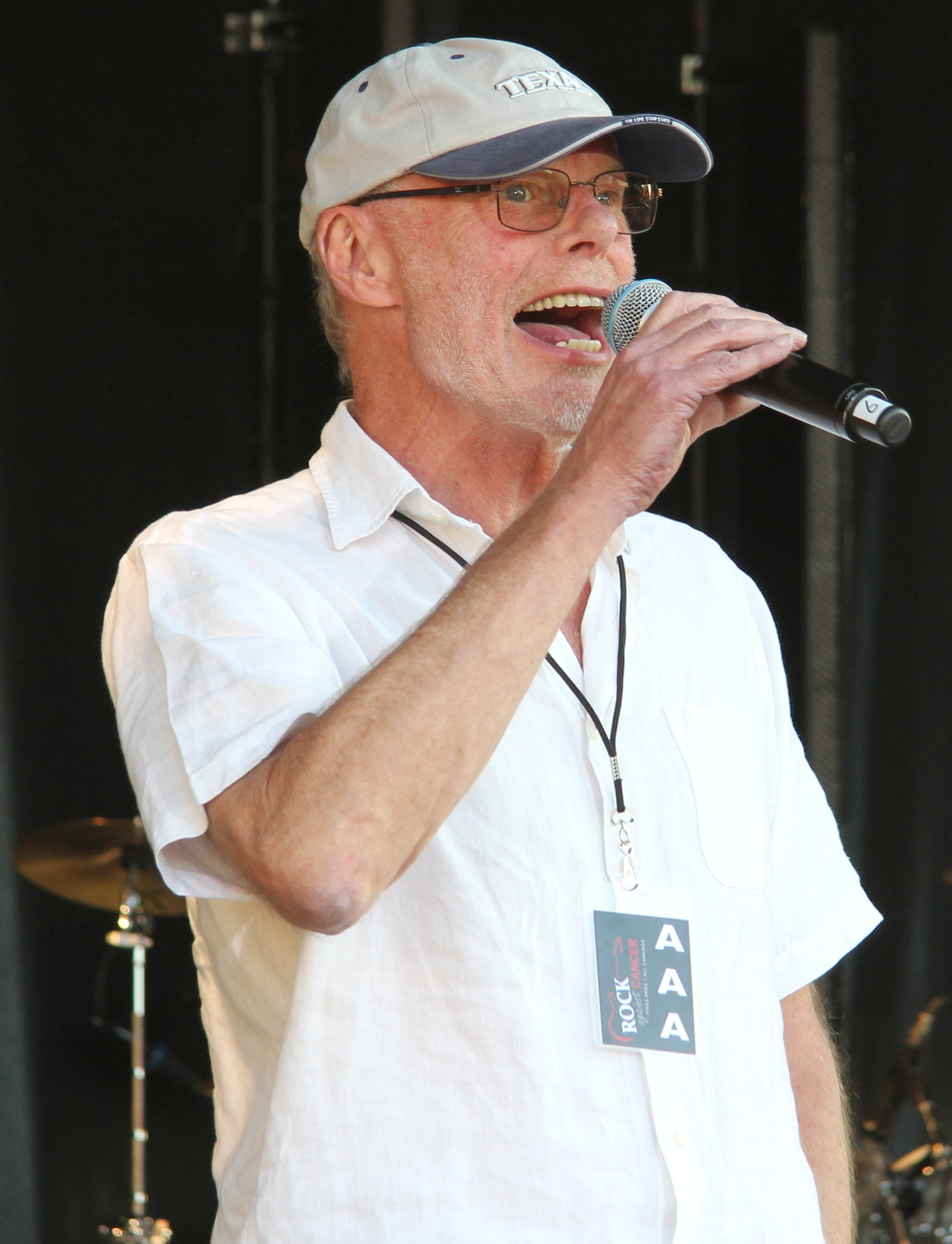
- Harris in 2012 at the Concert at the Kings, Wiltshire
- Born: Robert Brinley Joseph Harris; 11 April 1946 (age 80); Northampton, England
- Occupation: Broadcaster
- Years active: 1970–2026
- Spouse: Trudie Myerscough-Walker (m. 1991)
- Children: 8
- Website: bobharris.org

Robert Brinley Joseph Harris (born 11 April 1946), popularly known as "Whispering Bob" Harris, is an English retired broadcaster. In 1968 he was a co-founder of the listings magazine Time Out, co-editing until the early part of 1969 and was a host of the BBC2 music programme The Old Grey Whistle Test from 1972 to 1979. He presented The Country Show on BBC Radio 2 on Thursday nights from April 1999 to April 2026, and Sounds of the 70s on Sunday afternoons from November 2024 to March 2026, replacing Johnnie Walker.

Harris has been broadcasting on the BBC for 56 years and has been recognised with the Americana Music Association of America Trailblazer Award, a UK Heritage Award and a MOJO Medal, as well as his OBE for services to broadcasting.

== Early life ==
Born on 11 April 1946 in Northampton, England, Harris first followed in his father's footsteps and joined Northamptonshire Police as a cadet for two years. Harris's father was from Pontardawe in South Wales.

Rugby was a childhood passion for Harris, who played at school and later at county level. Interviewed in 2023, he said, "I did have a couple of concussions, but not the 25 people have said." He played for the Midlands and aspired to play for the England team, but his interest in music took over.

He then helped found Time Out magazine, as co-editor. Years later, he still refers to himself as "a journalist who can broadcast".

== Career ==
=== The Old Grey Whistle Test ===
Harris presented The Old Grey Whistle Test on BBC2 from 1972 until December 1979. His first appearance on the show was as chair of a debate on the Night Assemblies Bill, based on his experience as a journalist and at the invitation of producer Richard Williams. Shortly afterwards he was invited to be the main presenter. His velvety voice and quiet delivery earned him his enduring nickname "Whispering Bob". His hippie-style beard and laid-back presentation made him a target for parody, including by Eric Idle on the 1970s BBC comedy show Rutland Weekend Television.

Harris later became notorious among the younger generation for distancing himself on air from Roxy Music's first performance on the show and deriding the New York Dolls as "mock rock". In the summer of 1974, Malcolm McLaren and Vivienne Westwood included Harris ("or the 'Sniffing Whistler' as we know him") on a "Hates" list on their "You're going to wake up one morning and find out which side of the bed you've been lying on" T-shirt. In early 1977, at the Speakeasy (a London nightclub popular with rock stars of the day), Sex Pistols fan and subsequent bass player Sid Vicious threatened Harris over whether the Pistols would appear on the Old Grey Whistle Test.

=== 1980s ===
In 1981, Harris moved to BBC Radio Oxford, presenting the weekday afternoon show from 15:00–17:00, taking over from Timmy Mallett. Harris remained there until 1984. He then joined London's LBC radio station, presenting a weekly half-hour music review and also joined GWR, where he did shows on Saturday lunchtimes and Sunday afternoons.

From October 1984, Harris presented a Saturday evening show on Norwich's Radio Broadland, and the Sunday afternoon show on Hereward FM in Peterborough. He continued his half-hour music review on LBC and was recording shows for GWR. In 1986, he was offered the Weekend Nightline phone-in on LBC every Friday, Saturday, and Sunday from 10 pm until 1 am, which he hosted until 1989. He was heard on BFBS from 1986 to 1998 and on the UK Independent Local Radio sustaining service, The Superstation.

=== Return to BBC Radio 1 ===
Harris rejoined BBC Radio 1 in 1989, standing in for Richard Skinner for two weeks on the weekday midnight to 2 am slot, before being offered his own weekly show on Sunday nights from 11 pm to 2 am later that year following the death of Roger Scott. He had originally been on Radio 1 from 1970–1974, hosting the Monday night edition of 'Sounds of the 70s'.

Harris then took over the weekday midnight to 2 am slot from April 1990, which then became midnight to 4 am when Radio 1 started broadcasting 24 hours a day on 1 May 1991.

His programme on Radio 1 came to an end in October 1993 when Matthew Bannister took charge of the station, although he continued to present documentaries for the station for some time after.

=== Move to BBC Radio London ===
In summer 1994, Harris moved to BBC GLR, presenting a three-hour Saturday night show from 10 pm to 1 am, then additionally on Monday to Wednesday evenings from 8 pm to midnight. He later left the Saturday night show to concentrate on BBC GLR's Monday–Wednesday evening shows.

=== Return to national radio (1996–2026) ===
In December 1996 Harris returned to the national airwaves, this time on BBC Radio 2, hosting three programmes over the Christmas period. His first show for the station was on Saturday 21 December from 10pm-12 midnight.

In April 1997, Harris joined the station permanently, where he took up an 11 pm to 1 am Saturday night slot. He still continued to present on GLR, but at this stage he quit the Monday to Wednesday evening shows and presented a Saturday afternoon show from 2 to 6 pm.

Harris eventually quit GLR in late 1998 as he took over another show for Radio 2, Bob Harris Country (previously David Allan's Country Club), on Thursday evenings from 7 to 8 pm, from 8 April 1999, and his Saturday night show then went out from 10 pm to 1 am. From April 2006, his Saturday show moved to an 11 pm to 2 am slot, and moved back another hour from 4 April 2010, meaning it aired early Sunday mornings from midnight to 3 am. From October 2014 until January 2017, the show was on from 3 am to 6 am on Sundays. In February 2017, his Sunday show moved back to midnight to 3 am. However, on 26 March 2017, Harris presented his last weekend Sunday early morning show on Radio 2 due to major changes to the weekend schedule. The final song played was When You Come to the End of a Lollipop by Max Bygraves.

On 9 January 2022, Harris started a weekly show on Boom Radio, which explored how songs link together with other tracks. The hour-long programme was broadcast on Sunday nights from 9 pm and repeated on Wednesdays. The series ended its run on 27 February.

On 10 January 2022, Harris announced he was returning to the Sounds of the 70s programme after more than 50 years away by sitting in for Johnnie Walker on the episodes to be broadcast on Radio 2 on 16 and 23 January. He also sat in for Walker for four shows in January 2023. He presented The Country Show on Thursdays on BBC Radio 2 from 1999 to 2026. He celebrated his 25th anniversary as host of the country show in 2024.

On 6 October 2024, Johnnie Walker announced that Harris would take over as host of Radio 2's Sounds of the 70s in November, with Walker leaving the show due to illness after 15 years.

On 4 June 2026, Harris revealed he was stepping down from his presenting duties with BBC Radio 2, due to his ongoing health issues, after 56 years of broadcasting.

=== Other work ===
"At a time when media is ruled by the loud, the crass and the cruel, Harris is the anti-Cowell: a soft-spoken but fiercely witty presence, whose velvet delivery is as much a part of British rock culture as Roger Daltrey's stutter or the rolled letter "r" in Johnny Rotten's invective."

— Henry Yates, Classic Rock.

In addition to his Radio 2 programmes, in 2002 Harris was a presenter on the newly launched digital station BBC Radio 6 Music, presenting a Sunday evening show from 5 to 8 pm. He left 6 Music in 2004. He went on to present a new show on Radio 2, which broadcast on Friday nights/Saturday mornings from midnight to 3 am. He was replaced in this slot by Mark Lamarr, but returned to it temporarily, when Lamarr left the BBC at the end of 2010. The end of the Friday show has allowed Harris to concentrate more on producing one-off shows such as the Maple Leaf Revolution under the auspices of the Whispering Bob Broadcasting Company.

Harris was the subject of This Is Your Life in 2003 when he was surprised by Michael Aspel at BBC Broadcasting House.

Harris has presented the C2C: Country to Country festival live from The O2 Arena in London every year since its inception in 2013 and simultaneously broadcasts over BBC Radio 2 Country which was first established in 2015, the same year when Harris was given his own stage to present at the festival. This stage, the Under the Apple Tree stage, formed the basis for his own Under the Apple Tree festival which will first take place in 2016.

Harris has been credited by John Thomson as the inspiration for his The Fast Show character Louis Balfour, who comperes "Jazz Club" and whose softly spoken delivery echoes Harris' "unshakeable enthusiasm" on The Old Grey Whistle Test.

In 2018, Harris made a cameo appearance in Tom Harper's country music drama film Wild Rose.

In 2018, Harris joined 26 other celebrities at Metropolis Studios, to perform the original Christmas song "Rock with Rudolph", written and produced by Grahame and Jack Corbyn. The song was created in aid of Great Ormond Street Hospital and was released digitally on independent record label Saga Entertainment on 30 November 2018. The music video debuted exclusively with The Sun on 29 November 2018 and had its first TV showing on Good Morning Britain on 30 November 2018. The song peaked at number two on the iTunes pop chart.

In 2023, Harris began presenting on the free-to-air 1960s music channel That's 60s.

In April 2025, Harris appeared as a contestant, paired with expert Margie Cooper, on BBC's Celebrity Antiques Road Trip.

== Personal life ==
Harris has eight children, seven granddaughters and a grandson. Harris has been married twice. He remains friends with his first wife, Sue Harris Tillson who he met in 1964, and shares a birthday with their granddaughter Alana. Harris married Trudie Myerscough in 1991. She is the mother of his three youngest children. Harris lives in Steventon, Oxfordshire.

In 2007, Harris was diagnosed with prostate cancer, for which he was treated with hormone therapy and radiotherapy.

In June 2019 Harris announced that he would take a break from Radio 2 after suffering an aortic dissection earlier that month. He is an ambassador for the Aortic Dissection Charitable Trust.

== Awards ==
- Honorary Fellowship from the School of the Arts, Northampton University.
- Sony Radio Academy Awards 2009 – Silver for The Sandy Denny Story: Who Knows Where The Time Goes
- Sony Radio Academy Awards 2008 – Silver for The Day John Met Paul
- Country Music Association (CMA) International Broadcaster of the Year 2004.
- 2011 Mojo Medal
- Harris was awarded the Trailblazer Award by the Americana Music Association in 2011.
- Harris was appointed Officer of the British Empire (OBE) in the 2011 Birthday Honours for services to music broadcasting.
- On the red carpet of the 2012 CMA awards, Harris was awarded the CMA Wesley Rose International Media Achievement Award by Little Big Town.
- In 2013, Harris won his second CMA International Broadcaster of the Year Award.
- On the last day of the 2016 Country to Country festival, Harris was awarded his second CMA Wesley Rose International Media Achievement Award by Kacey Musgraves.
- On Day 2 of C2C 2017, Kristian Bush surprised Harris with the CMA International Broadcaster of the Year Award.

== Books ==
- Harris, Bob (2001). Bob Harris – The Whispering Years. BBC Worldwide. ISBN 0-563-53775-2.
- Harris, Bob (2015). Still Whispering After All These Years. Michael O'Mara Books. ISBN 978-1782433613.
