= Geoff Dunn =

English rock drummer

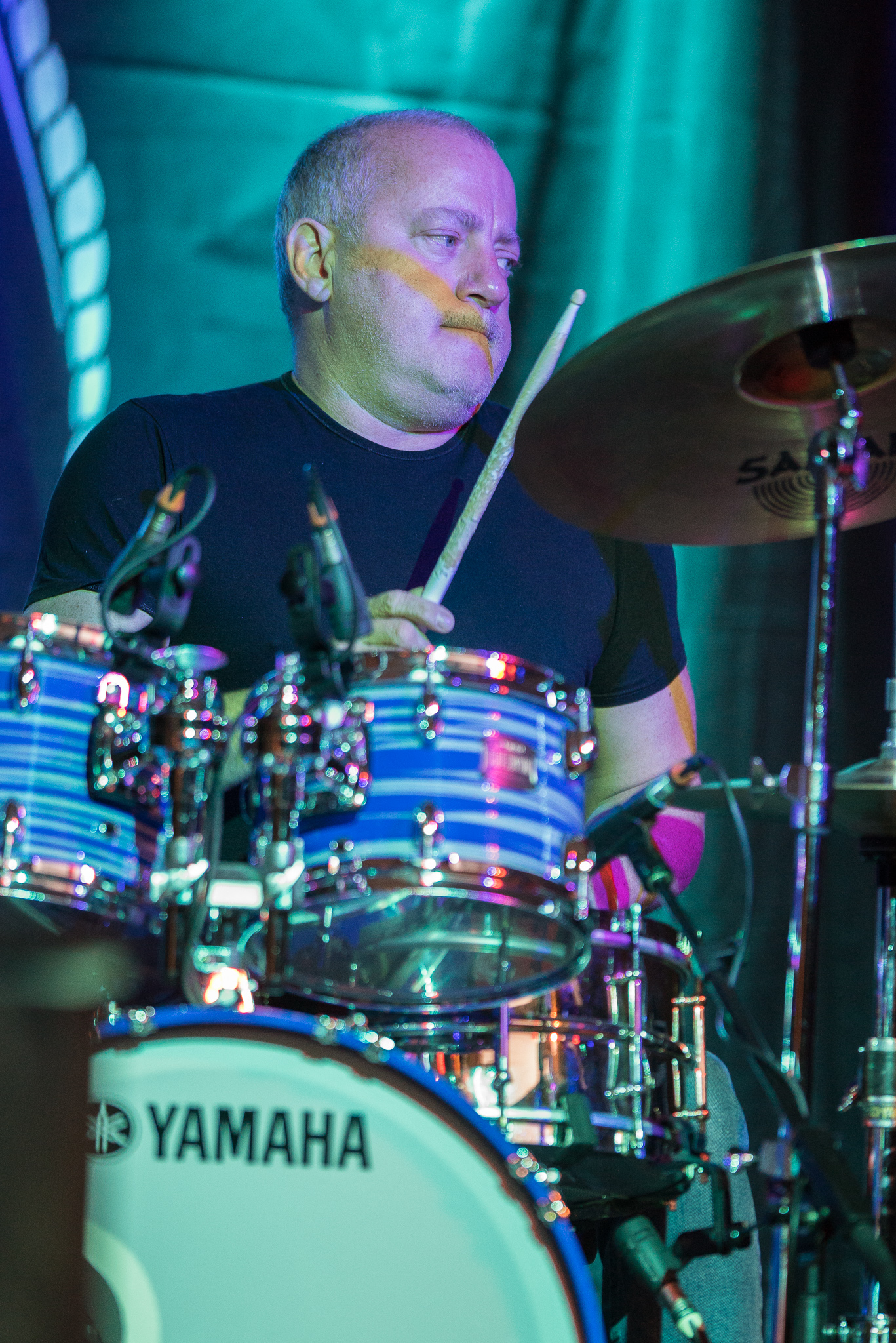
Geoff Dunn (2017)

Geoffrey Edwin Dunn (born 26 February 1961 in Clapham, London, England) is an English rock drummer. From 2002 until his departure in 2007, he was the drummer with the rock band Manfred Mann's Earth Band. Before joining the Earth Band, his long list of credits includes a stint playing and recording with Van Morrison, featuring on the albums Too Long in Exile, A Night in San Francisco, Days Like This and The Healing Game.

He was a member of Procol Harum from 2006 until they disbanded in 2022. He appears on their live albums One Eye to the Future – Live in Italy 2007, The Spirit of Nøkken and MMX, and final studio album Novum in 2017.
