= Brian Kennedy (singer) =

Northern Irish singer

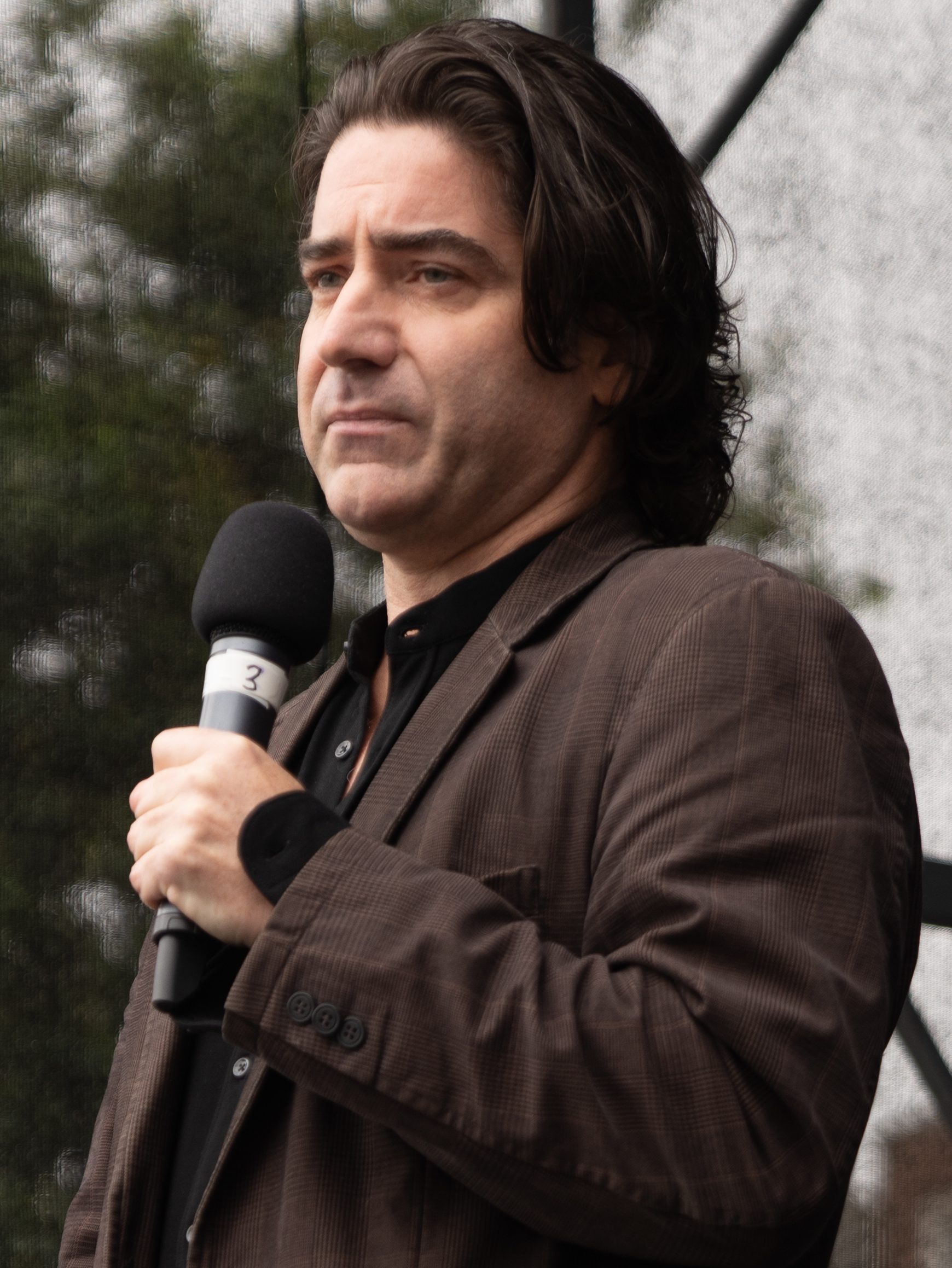
- Kennedy in 2018

Background information
- Born: 12 October 1966 (age 60); Belfast, Northern Ireland
- Genres: Rock; pop; country; folk
- Occupations: Singer; songwriter; author
- Years active: 1988–present
- Website: briankennedy.co.uk

Brian Edward Patrick Kennedy (born 12 October 1966) is a singer, songwriter, and author from Northern Ireland. He had a number of hit singles and albums in the UK and Ireland during the 1990s and 2000s. He represented Ireland in the Eurovision Song Contest 2006 with his song "Every Song is a Cry for Love" and finished in 10th place, with his performance notably marking the 1,000th song to be performed in Eurovision history.

== Early life ==
Brian Edward Patrick Kennedy was born in Belfast on 12 October 1966, the son of Lily and Jim Kennedy. His older brother, Martin Christopher "Bap" Kennedy (1962–2016), was also a musician. The brothers grew up on Falls Road. As a child, Kennedy suffered from Osgood–Schlatter disease in both legs. He has described witnessing the violence of the Troubles while growing up, such as seeing a young man being chased and shot dead by a British soldier a few feet away from him. He would often harmonise with the sirens of police cars, ambulances, and fire trucks.

== Career ==
Kennedy made his debut in 1988 as a chorus on the recordings of fellow Northern Ireland singer-songwriter Van Morrison, going on to appear as a backing singer on a number of his albums, including A Night in San Francisco, Days Like This, The Healing Game and Back on Top and live in concert. Around this time, Kennedy also scored a minor UK hit album of his own with The Great War of Words (1990). This album features the lead single "Captured" which was a minor hit in both the UK and Irish charts.

In 1991, Kennedy was joined by Mark E. Nevin, formerly of Fairground Attraction, to form the duo Sweetmouth. Their album, Goodbye to Songtown, was released in August 1991 and features the songs written by Nevin for a second Fairground Attraction album which was never realised.

In the mid-1990s, pop manager Simon Fuller took on Kennedy, signing him to RCA Records for his second solo album which saw greater success. Released in 1996, A Better Man reached No. 19 in the UK and spawned the hit singles "A Better Man" (No. 28), "Life Love and Happiness" (No. 27) and "Put the Message in a Box" (No. 37), which also all became top 20 hits in Ireland. This was followed in 1999 by the album Now That I Know What I Want, which met with less success.

In 2001, Kennedy released his fourth album Get on with Your Short Life, which rendered only a No. 81 placing for its title track in the UK. Later that year, he performed on the original Secret Garden version of the song "You Raise Me Up", which went on to be recorded by many other artists, such as Josh Groban and Westlife. This was the song he sang at the funeral of the footballer George Best in late 2005. Kennedy's version was released again in December 2005 and early the following year became his biggest hit, released as the EP "George Best – a Tribute" with Peter Corry. The single reached No. 4 in the UK charts and No. 3 in Ireland.

Kennedy was chosen as the Irish competitor for the Eurovision Song Contest 2006 in Athens, where he sang the self-penned "Every Song is a Cry for Love". His performance in the contest's semi-finals marked the 1,000th song performed in Eurovision history. Following qualification, he finished tenth in the finals on 20 May, with 93 points. The song also performed well in the Irish charts, becoming a No. 4 hit.

Kennedy performed at the opening of new studios for his local station Belfast CityBeat in 2006. In July 2008, he joined the judging panel of the Citybeat Young Star Search, Northern Ireland's biggest kids talent search.

On 23 August 2010, Kennedy played a version of his song "Christopher Street" on a small balcony overlooking Dame Street, Dublin for the music viral show BalconyTV.

In 2011 he was a guest vocalist on Clannad: Christ Church Cathedral.

Between 2011 and 2012, Kennedy was a coach on the first series of The Voice of Ireland. The series screened on RTÉ during the early months of 2012 and Kennedy mentored the eventual runner-up in the final, Richie Hayes.

In October 2018, Kennedy started presenting a weekly programme on radio station Tipp FM.

== Personal life ==
Kennedy is gay.

He revealed in 2016 that he had been diagnosed with rectal cancer.

== Discography ==
=== Albums ===
Year	Album details	Peak chart positions
Year	Album details	UK
1990	The Great War of Words: Released: March 1999; Label: RCA (PD 74475); Formats: CD, cassette, LP	64
1996	A Better Man: Released: October 1996; Label: RCA, BMG (74321409134); Formats: CD, cassette	19
1999	Now That I Know What I Want: Released: 1999; Label: Sony (496196.2); Formats: CD, cassette	—
2001	Get on With Your Short Life: Released: 2001; Label: Sony/Columbia (504784.2); Formats: CD, cassette	—
2003	On Song: Released: 2003; Label: Curb Records (CURCD 128); Formats: CD	—
2004	Live in Belfast: Released: 2004; Label: Curb Records (CURCD 148); Formats: 2xCD	—
2005	On Song 2 (Red Sails in the Sunset): Released: 2005; Label: Curb Records (CURCD 160); Formats: CD	—
2006	Homebird: Released: May 2006; Label: Curb Records (CURCD 217); Formats: 2x CD	—
2008	Interpretations: Released: March 2008; Label: Curb Records (CURCD 237); Formats: CD	—
2010	The Very Best of Brian Kennedy: Released: 2010; Label: Proper Music Distribution (PMDCD001); Formats: CD	—
2012	Voice: Released: June 2012; Label: Collective Management (BKCD001); Formats: CD, DD	—
2013	A Love Letter to Joni: Released: 2013; Label: BK Records (BKCD002); Formats: CD, DD	—
2016	Essential: Released: September 2016; Label: BK Records (BKCD003); Formats: 2xCD, DD; note: re-recordings of previous material	—
2017	Live at Vicar Street: Released: June 2017; Label: BK Records; Formats: 2xCD+DVD, DD	—
2017	Christmassy: Released: November 2017; Label: BK Records (BKCD006); Formats: CD, DD	—

=== Singles ===
Year	Title	Peak chart positions		Album
Year	Title	IRE	UK	Album
1990	"Captured"	26	77	The Great War of Words
1990	"Hollow"	—	—	The Great War of Words
1990	"Believe It"	—	—	The Great War of Words
1991	"Fear Is the Enemy of Love" (Sweetmouth with Brian Kennedy)	—	—	Goodbye to Songtown
1995	"Intuition"	16	—	Non-album single
1996	"A Better Man"	6	28	A Better Man
1996	"Life Love and Happiness"	16	27	A Better Man
1997	"Put the Message in the Box"	18	37	A Better Man
1999	"These Days" (with Ronan Keating)	4	—	Now That I Know What I Want
1999	"Playin' with My Heart"	—	—	Now That I Know What I Want
2000	"Back in Your Arms" / "I Hope That I Don't Fall in Love with You"	—	—	Now That I Know What I Want
2001	"Get on with Your Short Life"	—	81	Get on with Your Short Life
2001	"So What if It Rains"	—	—	Get on with Your Short Life
2002	"Only Love Can Break Your Heart"	—	—	Get on with Your Short Life
2003	"You Raise Me Up"	—	91	On Song
2005	"The Island" (featuring Juliet Turner)	—	—	Non-album singles
2005	"George Best – A Tribute" (with Peter Corry)	3	4	Non-album singles
2006	"Every Song Is a Cry for Love"	4	—	Homebird
2006	"If You Don't Believe in Me"	—	—	Homebird
2006	"Destination"	—	—	Homebird
2011	"Ireland's Call" (with Paul Byrom)	—	—	The Official Rugby World Cup 2011
2012	"Best Days"	—	—	Voice
2012	"Christmas Morning"	—	—	Non-album single
2013	"Try"	15	—	The Hit
2013	"River"	—	—	Non-album singles
2013	"Life, Love & Happiness" (Stereolove with Brian Kennedy)	—	—	Non-album singles

=== Other songs ===
- A cover of "Dry Your Eyes" by The Streets on Even Better than the Real Thing Vol. 2 (2004)
- A cover of "Angel (Floating Round this House)" by Kirsty MacColl on The Concert for Kirsty MacColl (2013)

== Writing career ==
- The Arrival of Fergal Flynn (Hodder, 2004), a novel
- Roman Song (Hodder, 2005), a novel

Awards and achievements
Preceded by Donna and Joe with "Love?"	Ireland in the Eurovision Song Contest; 2006	Succeeded by Dervish with "They Can't Stop The Spring"
