= Beckington =

Village in Somerset, England

Coordinates: 51.2649°N 2.2845°W

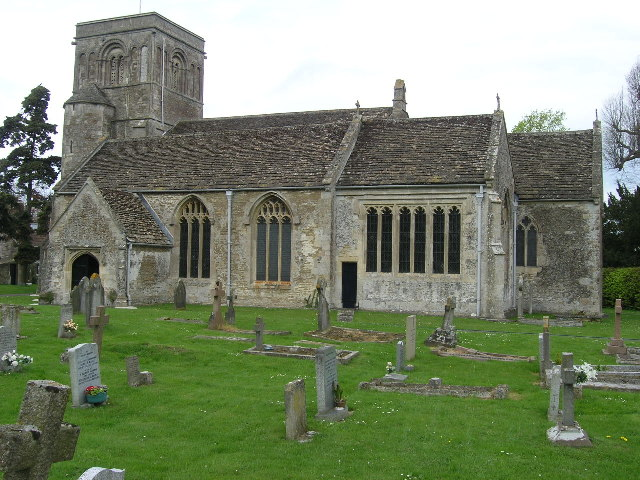
- St George's Church, Beckington

- Location within Somerset
- Population: 1,001
- OS grid reference: ST801518
- Unitary authority: Somerset Council
- Ceremonial county: Somerset
- Region: South West
- Country: England
- Sovereign state: United Kingdom
- Post town: FROME
- Postcode district: BA11
- Dialling code: 01373
- Police: Avon and Somerset
- Fire: Devon and Somerset
- Ambulance: South Western
- UK Parliament: Frome and East Somerset

Beckington is a village and civil parish in Somerset, England, across the River Frome from Lullington about three miles north of Frome. According to the 2011 census the parish, which includes the hamlets of Rudge and Standerwick, has a population of 983.

== History ==
Beckington is mentioned in the Domesday Book of 1086, when it was held by a Roger Bushell, in the place of Æthelfrith, and it was taxed for ten hides, thereby suggesting that the cultivated area was around 1200 acres. The parish was part of the hundred of Frome and, given that a Hundred comprised one hundred hides, the estate would appear to have made up a significant proportion of its hundred.

During the medieval period, Beckington was a major centre for the wool trade. By the 15th century, fulling mills had been built along the banks of the River Frome which supported the spinning and weaving cottage industries.

During the Laudian Reforms that took place in Charles I's Personal Rule period, two churchwardens in Beckington would be excommunicated from the Church of England for not obeying orders regarding Church layout. Altars were to be placed against the east wall of churches under the new rulings, yet the broadly Puritan parishioners (along with local landowner John Ashe, a future MP) rejected this Catholic-like approach and the churchwardens were found not to have obeyed this rule in a visitation. In 1635, the churchwardens were excommunicated by the bishop's court in Wells. In 1636, they were further indicted for brawling in church, likely as part of efforts to prevent moving the communion table. They were released and absolved in 1637, providing they read out a declaration as an act of penance, with life in prison having proved too much. However, James Wheller (one of the dissident churchwardens) would die shortly after, allegedly as a result of these events, and the parishioners continued in conflict with the new minister, a Mr Huish.

The English antiquary John Aubrey (1626–1697) noted in his Brief Lives: "Carrots were first sown at Beckington in Somersetshire. Some very old Man there did remember their first bringing hither."

In September 1766, rioters marched to Beckington and set on fire a mill and other property, in spite of being offered money and parish relief for their families.

== Governance ==
The parish council has responsibility for local issues, including setting an annual precept (local rate) to cover the council's operating costs and producing annual accounts for public scrutiny. The parish council evaluates local planning applications and works with the local police, district council officers, and neighbourhood watch groups on matters of crime, security, and traffic. The parish council's role also includes initiating projects for the maintenance and repair of parish facilities, as well as consulting with the district council on the maintenance, repair, and improvement of highways, drainage, footpaths, public transport, and street cleaning. Conservation matters (including trees and listed buildings) and environmental issues are also the responsibility of the council.

For local government purposes, since 1 April 2023, the parish comes under the unitary authority of Somerset Council. Prior to this, it was part of the non-metropolitan district of Mendip (established under the Local Government Act 1972). It was part of Frome Rural District before 1974.

The village falls in the 'Beckington and Selwood' electoral ward. The ward stretches from Beckington south to East Woodlands but avoiding Frome. The total population of the ward at the 2011 census was 2,125.

It is also part of the Frome and East Somerset county constituency represented in the House of Commons of the Parliament of the United Kingdom. It elects one Member of Parliament (MP) by the first past the post system of election.

== Transport ==
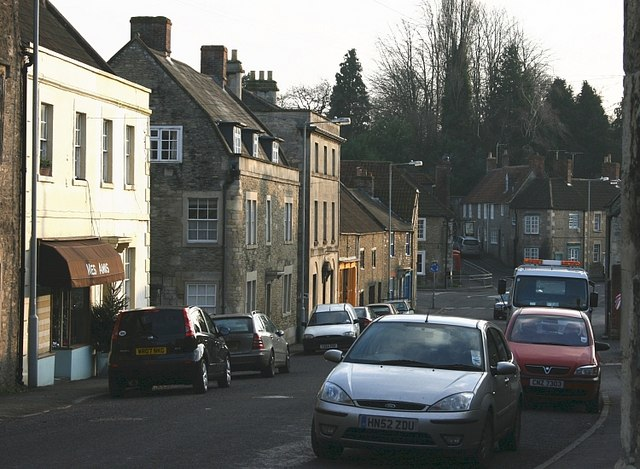
Bath Road, Beckington

Beckington was on the A36 until a bypass was built in 1989. For years, the T-junction in the centre of the village was in grid-lock during the busy commuter times and holiday season. The location was marked by a large, evergreen bush that was cleverly snipped to the shape of a battle-tank.

== Education ==
Beckington school is a Church of England Voluntary Controlled First School which was built in 1852. Springmead Preparatory School is also based in the village.

== Landmarks ==
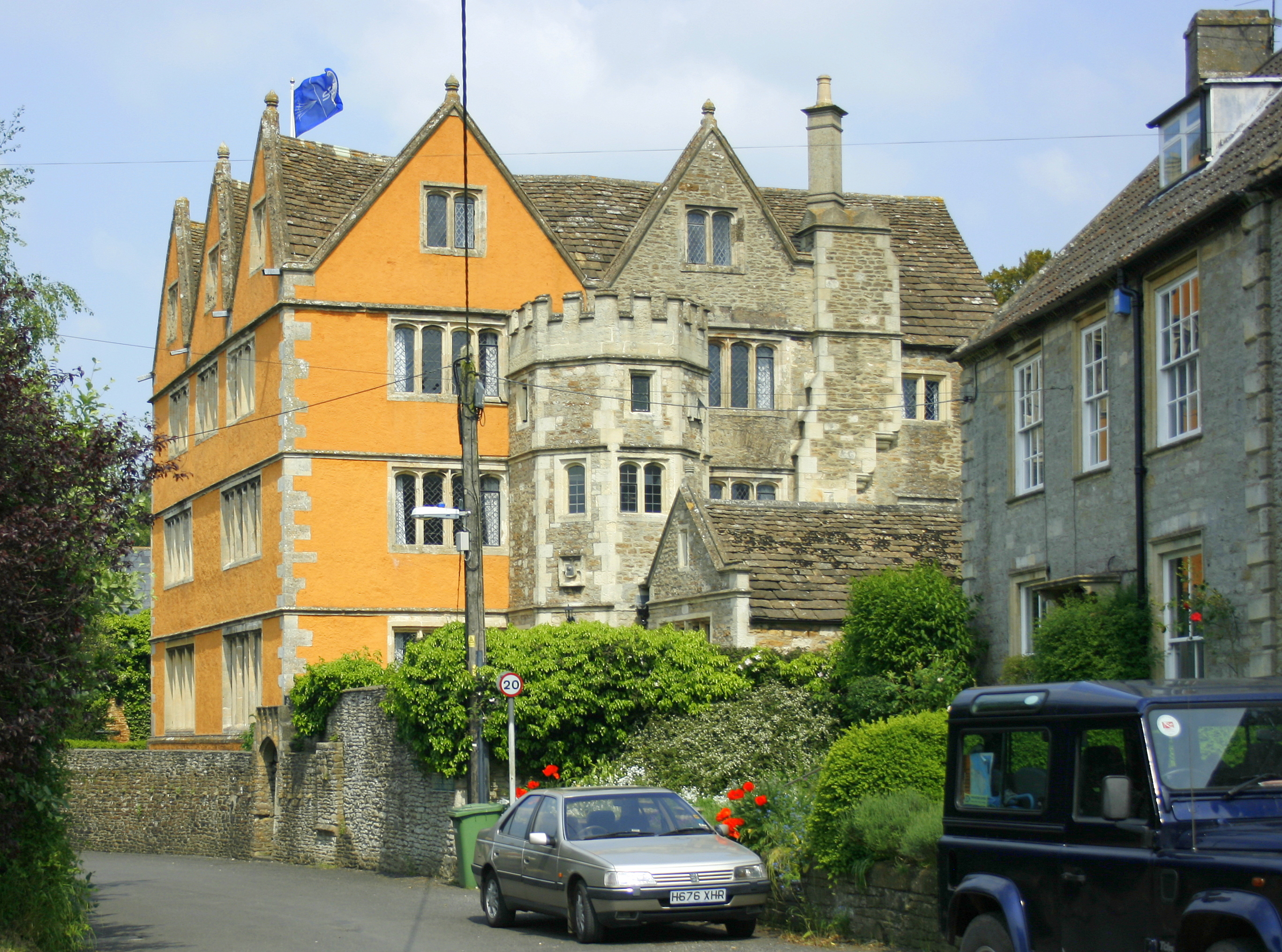
Beckington Castle

Seymours Court Farmhouse dates from the 15th century and is Grade I listed. It was once the home of Thomas Seymour, 1st Baron Seymour of Sudeley, who married Queen Catherine Parr.

Beckington Castle, which housed Ravenscroft School between 1945 and 1970, was originally built in the 17th century. It is now home to a company providing technical and procurement support to the Ministry of Defence.

The Wool Hall, next door, dates from the 16th century, was substantially restored in the 19th century, and served as a recording studio from the early 1980s until its closure in 2004. Artists who recorded and mixed at the studio include Tears for Fears (who set up the studio), The Smiths, Van Morrison (who owned the studio between 1994 and 2002), Joni Mitchell, Black Sabbath, Stereophonics, The Cure, The Pretenders, Peter Murphy and many others.

The cottages along Church Street date from around 1720.

Like the Wool Hall, the Woolpack Inn took its name from the village trade and opened as a coaching inn in the 16th century, but the current building was rebuilt on the site in the late 18th.

Beckington is also home to two village pumps. One of these is near the church under a hooded wooden structure, whilst the other is located on a parkway.

== Religious sites ==
It has a Norman Church of St George dating from the 14th century. The tower contains two bells dating from 1756 and made by Thomas Bilbie of the Bilbie family. It has been designated by English Heritage as a Grade I listed building.

The Abbey, Beckington, dating from 1502, is a former monastic grange and college for priests later adapted as a house.

== Standerwick ==
The hamlet of Standerwick within the parish of Beckington includes the Frome Agricultural Market and has one public house, The Bell. Its existence is recorded as far back as 1660. Buildings include Standerwick Court, a manor house in the grounds of which is said to be an ancient encampment, perhaps a connecting station between Bath and King Alfred's Tower at Stourton.

Foxes Drove Farm dates from around 1750.

== Notable people ==
- Samuel Daniel (1562 – 1619), poet and historian retired to a farm called "The Ridge" in the village and is buried in the parish churchyard.
- Thomas Beckington (also spelt Beckyngton) (c. 1390 – 1465) was born in the village before becoming Bishop of Bath and Wells and King's Secretary
- Sir Lislebone Long (1613–1659) (baptised Loveban) was born in the village and became Speaker of the House of Commons in 1659.
- William Roger Brown (1831–1902), lord of the manor
- Alfred Parsons (1847–1911), artist
