= Leo Green =

British musician and broadcaster (born 1972)

- Born: 30 August 1972 (age 53)
- Occupations: Musician, broadcaster
- Instruments: Saxophone, clarinet
- Years active: 1993–present
- Website: theleogreenexperience.com

Leo Green (born 30 August 1972) is a British musician and broadcaster.

== Saxophonist and orchestra leader ==
Green played with Van Morrison's band. Green plays saxophone and sings in his own band. In 2010 guitarist Jeff Beck said, "Leo Green has to be one of the best and craziest saxophonists ever".

The Leo Green Orchestra accompanied Tom Chaplin (from Keane), Beverley Knight and Imelda May for concerts that were broadcast on BBC Radio 2.

== Broadcaster ==
Green has presented programmes on BBC radio, including:

- 2013 – Leo Green's Hollywood Special
- 2014 – It Was a Very Good Year – The Ervin Drake Story
- 2014 – Ella and the Songbooks
- 2014 – Too Late to Stop Now – The Van Morrison Story
- 2015–16 - Sounds of the 50s with Leo Green.
- 2016 – Leo Green Remembers...
- 2016 – Leo Green Talks....Jazz
- 2017 – Leo Green's Great American Songbook
- 2017 – Leo Green's Lovers Of Swing
- 2018–19 - The Green Room

Green has hosted several editions of BBC Radio 2's Friday Night Is Music Night.

== Discography ==
=== As leader ===
- Suited and Booted (2006)
- Sax Moods: The Way We Were (2002)
- Straight Up (1998)

=== As sideman ===
With Jeff Beck

- Crazy Legs (1993)

With Van Morrison

- Days Like This (1995)
- How Long Has This Been Going On (1996) (with Georgie Fame and friends)
- Tell Me Something: The Songs of Mose Allison (1996) (with Georgie Fame, Ben Sidran, and Mose Allison)
- The Healing Game (1997)
- Back on Top [Bonus Tracks] (originally released 1999)

With Lisa Stansfield

- Swing (1999)

With Jane Horrocks

- Further Adventures of Little Voice Jane Horrocks (2000)

With Jools Holland

- Small World Big Band (2001)
- Swing Album (2001)
- Jools Holland's Big Band (2002)
- More Friends: Small World Big Band, Vol. 2 (2002)
- Swinging the Blues Dancing the Ska (2005)

Daniel Bedingfield

- Gotta Get Thru This (2002)

With Beth Gibbons & Rustin Man

- Out of Season (2002)

With Various

- Songs of Jimmie Rodgers: A Tribute (1997)
- A Tribute to Bacharach & David (2001)
- A Tribute to Leiber & Stoller (2002)
- Let Me Be Your Side Track: The Influence of Jimmy Rogers (2008)
