= 2025 New Year Honours =

British royal recognitions

The 2025 New Year Honours are appointments by King Charles III among the 15 Commonwealth realms to various orders and honours to recognise and reward good works by citizens of those countries. The New Year Honours are awarded as part of the New Year celebrations at the start of January and those for 2025 were announced on 30 December 2024.

The recipients of honours are displayed as styled before appointment to the honour awarded upon the advice of the King's ministers and arranged by country, precedence and grade (i.e. Knight/Dame Grand Cross, Knight/Dame Commander, etc.), and then by divisions (i.e. Civil, Diplomatic, and Military), as appropriate.

== United Kingdom ==
Below are the individuals appointed by Charles III in his right as King of the United Kingdom of Great Britain and Northern Ireland with honours within his own gift or upon the advice of his Government for other honours.

=== The Order of the Companions of Honour ===
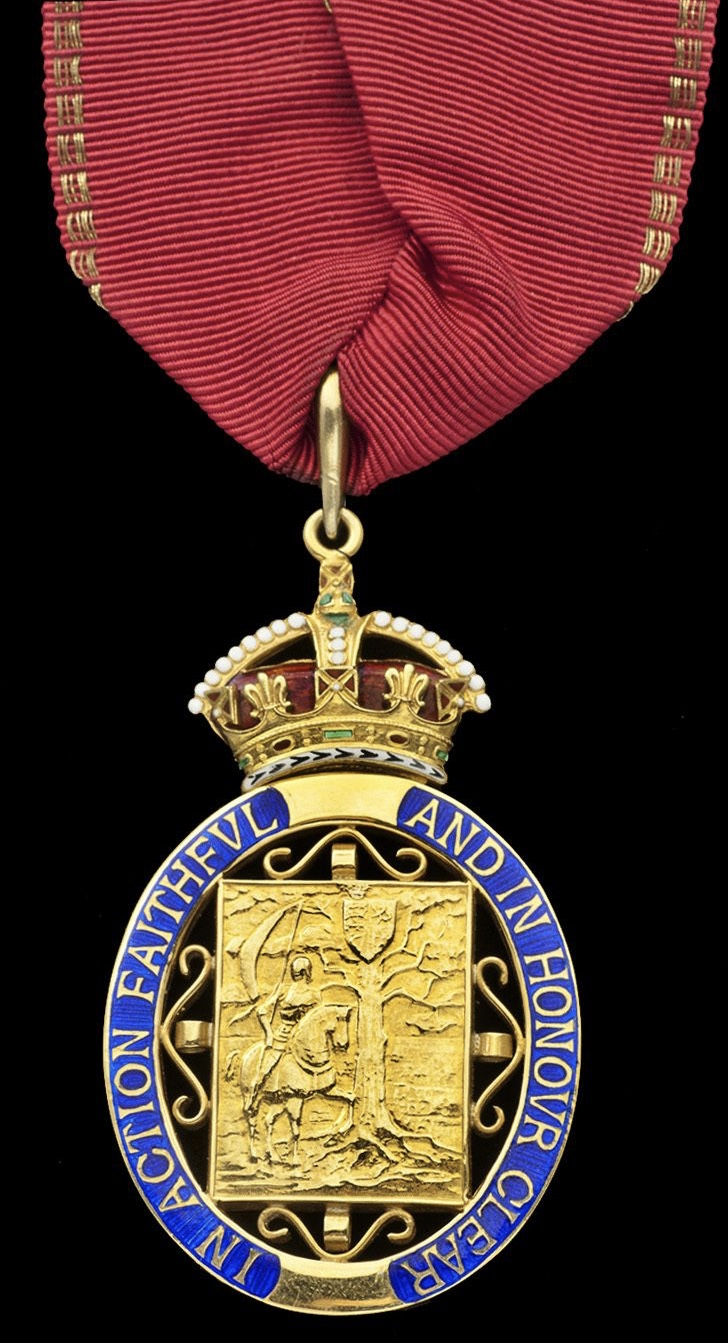
Insignia of a Member of the Order of the Companions of Honour

- Sir Kazuo Ishiguro OBE – Author and Screenwriter. For services to Literature.

=== Knights Bachelor ===
- Edward Charles Braham – Chair, M&G. For services to Corporate Law and to Business.
- Stuart Carlton – Corporate Director, Children’s Services, North Yorkshire County Council. For services to Children, Young People and Families.
- Andrew Cooke QPM, DL – HM Chief Inspector, HM Inspectorate of Constabulary and Fire and Rescue Services. For services to Policing and to Public Service.
- Professor Jack Martin Cuzick CBE, FRS – Emeritus Professor of Epidemiology, Queen Mary’s University of London. For services to Epidemiology.
- Thomas Gerald Reames Davies CBE, DL – lately President, Welsh Rugby Union. For services to Rugby Union, and to voluntary and charitable service in Wales.
- David Warren Arthur East CBE, FRS, FREng – lately Chief Executive, Rolls Royce. For services to the Economy and to Net Zero.
- Dr Gabriele Maria Finaldi – Director, National Gallery. For services to Art and Culture.
- Stephen John Fry – President, Mind and Vice-President, Fauna & Flora International. For services to Mental Health Awareness, the Environment and to Charity.
- The Right Honourable Nicolas John Gibb. For services to Education.
- Dr Loyd Daniel Gilman Grossman CBE – Chair, The Royal Parks. For services to Heritage.
- Andrew Haines OBE – Chief Executive Officer, Network Rail. For services to the Transport Sector and to the Economy.
- Professor Bashir Mohammed Ali Al-Hashimi CBE, FRS, FREng – Vice-President (Research and Innovation), King’s College London. For services to Engineering and Education.
- Alan James Hollinghurst, Author. For services to Literature.
- Jeremy Michael Isaacs CBE – Honorary Life Chair, Noah’s Ark Children’s Hospice. For services to Philanthropy and to Children’s Hospice Care.
- The Right Honourable Ranil Malcolm Jayawardena – lately Member of Parliament for North East Hampshire. For Political and Public Service.
- The Right Honourable Marcus Charles Jones – lately Member of Parliament for Nuneaton and Deputy Chief Whip. For Political and Public Service
- The Right Honourable Sadiq Khan – Mayor of London. For Political and Public Service.
- Dr John Wilfred Lazar CBE – Co-Founder, Enza Capital. For services to Engineering and Technology.
- Noel Paul Quinn – Group Chief Executive, HSBC. For services to Financial Services and to Net Zero.
- Bryan Kaye Sanderson CBE – lately Chair, Low Pay Commission. For services to the Labour Market.
- Gareth Southgate OBE – lately Manager, England National Football Team. For services to Association Football.
- Dr Andrew John Street CBE – lately Mayor, West Midlands. For Public Service

=== The Most Honourable Order of the Bath ===
==== Knight / Dame Commander of the Order of the Bath (KCB / DCB) ====
Military

- Vice Admiral Martin John Connell CBE – Royal Navy, C034297Q.
- General Gwyn Jenkins CB, OBE – Royal Marines, N028429W.
- Lieutenant General Tom Richardson Copinger-Symes CBE – 530862.

Civil

- Tamara Margaret Finkelstein CB – Permanent Secretary, Department for the Environment, Food and Rural Affairs. For Public Service
- Ken McCallum – Director General, MI5. For Public Service.

==== Companion of the Order of the Bath (CB) ====
Military

- Rear Admiral Thomas Edward Manson OBE – Royal Navy, C032351C.
- Rear Admiral Judith Helen Terry OBE – Royal Navy, V030693E.
- Major General Gerald Ewart-Brookes – 534978.
- Major General Alastair Andrew Bernard Reibey Bruce of Crionaich OBE, DL, VR – Army Reserve, 509493.
- Major General Marc Anthony John McHardy Overton TD, VR – Army Reserve, 539254.
- Air Vice-Marshal Simon Scott Edwards – Royal Air Force, 8304305G.
- Air Marshal Paul Alexander Godfrey OBE – Royal Air Force, 8304527R.
- Air Vice-Marshal Tamara Nancy Jennings OBE – Royal Air Force, 306449K.

Civil

- Sarah Winifred Albon – Chief Executive, Health and Safety Executive, Department for Work and Pensions. For services to Public Administration.
- Michelle Sarah Dyson – Director General, Adult Social Care, Department of Health and Social Care. For services to Health and Social Care.
- Jessica Elizabeth Glover – Director General, HM Treasury. For Public Service.
- Amy-Claire Elisabeth Mason – Chief Executive Officer and Director General, HM Prison and Probation Service. For Public Service.
- Professor Paul Steven Monks – Director General, Chief Scientific Adviser, Department for Energy Security and Net Zero. For services to Science in Government.
- Jaee Kamalnath Samant CBE – Director General, Public Safety Group, Home Office. For Public Service.
- Catherine Elinor Vaughan – Director General, Department for Work and Pensions. For Public Service.

=== The Most Distinguished Order of Saint Michael and Saint George ===
==== Knight / Dame Commander of the Order of St Michael and St George (KCMG / DCMG) ====
- Eleanor Veronica Elizabeth Sharpston KC – Yorke Distinguished Visiting Fellow: lately Arthur Goodhart Visiting Professor in Legal Science; formerly Advocate General, European Court of Justice. For services to Justice and to the Education of Law in the UK and Europe.
- David Quarrey CMG – UK Permanent Representative to NATO, UK Delegation to NATO, Brussels. For services to British Foreign Policy and International Security.

==== Companion of the Order of St Michael and St George (CMG) ====
- Diane Louise Corner OBE – lately HM Consul-General, British Consulate-General Jerusalem. For services to British Foreign Policy.
- John Moelwyn Edwards – Director for Investment, Department for Business and Trade; formerly HM Trade Commissioner for China and Consul General to Shanghai. For services to International Trade and Investment.
- Dr Alan Frederick Graeme Groom – Consultant Orthopaedic Surgeon, King’s College Hospital, London; Co-Chair and Volunteer surgeon, IDEALS Charity; Founder, Rebuild. For services to International Disaster and Emergency Aid.
- Michael James Harman – Director, Foreign, Commonwealth and Development Office. For services to National Security.
- Dr Rachel Emma-Jane King – lately Principal Private Secretary to the Foreign Secretary and Director Private Office Directorate, Foreign, Commonwealth and Development Office. For services to British Foreign Policy.
- Dr Huw Llywelyn – Director, Codification Division of the United Nations Office of Legal Affairs. For services to International Law.
- Stephen John Mannion – Consultant Orthopaedic Surgeon and Founder, Feet First. For services to Trauma Surgery within Conflict and Disaster Zones Worldwide.
- Professor Ashley Moffett – Professor of Reproductive Immunology, University of Cambridge. For services to Women’s Reproductive Health and, to Clinical Research and Practice in Africa.
- Richard James Squire OBE – Director, Foreign, Commonwealth and Development Office. For services to British Foreign Policy.
- Simon Christopher Walters – HM Ambassador, British Embassy Tel Aviv. For services to British Foreign Policy.
- Matthew Stephen Spence Wyatt – Director, Humanitarian, Migration, and Food Security, Foreign, Commonwealth and Development Office. For services to International Development and UK Humanitarian Operations overseas.

=== The Royal Victorian Order ===
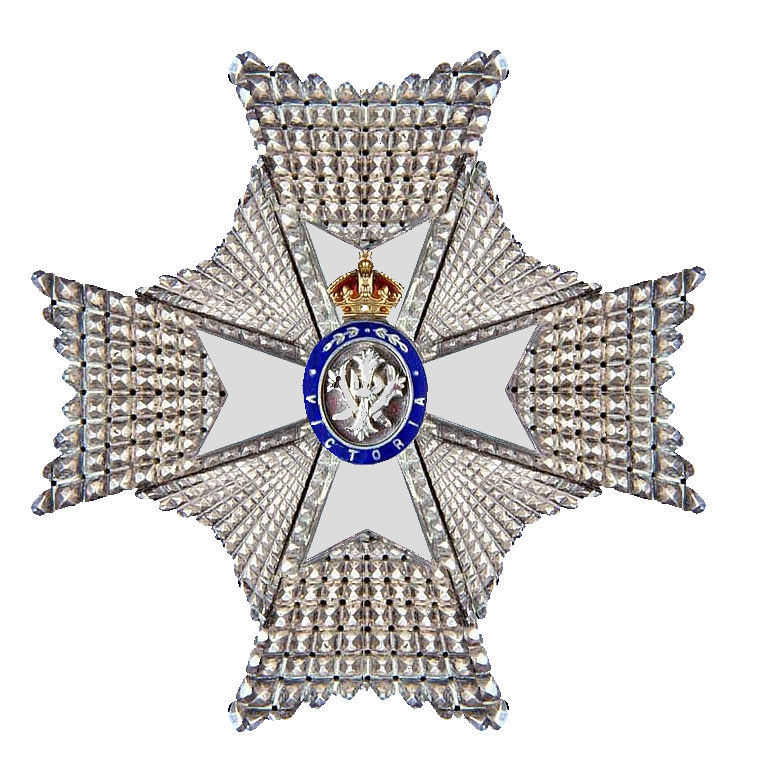
Breast star of a Knight / Dame Commander of the Royal Victorian Order

==== Dame Grand Cross of the Royal Victorian Order (GCVO) ====
- The Honourable Dame Annabel Alice Hoyer Whitehead DCVO – Lady of the Royal Household.

==== Knight / Dame Commander of the Royal Victorian Order (KCVO / DCVO) ====
- Sarah Rose Troughton – Lord-Lieutenant of Wiltshire.
- Ian James Dudson CBE – Lord-Lieutenant of Staffordshire.
- Nathan James Thompson CVO – lately Clerk of the Council and Chief Executive, Duchy of Lancaster

==== Commander of the Royal Victorian Order (CVO) ====
- Hugh Jonathan Watson Bullock – lately Council Member, Duchy of Lancaster.
- Timothy Hugh Stewart Duke DL – lately Clarenceux King of Arms, College of Arms.
- Dr Douglas James Allan Glass LVO – Apothecary to The King.
- John Clive Cecil May OBE, DL – lately Secretary-General, The Duke of Edinburgh’s International Award.
- Sarah Squire LVO – Deputy Director of HR, Royal Household.
- David Charles Wheeler LVO – Senior Decorative Arts Conservator, Royal Collection, Royal Household.

==== Lieutenant of the Royal Victorian Order (LVO) ====
- Roderick Benson, Veterinary Surgeon.
- Sandra Bull MVO – Assistant Correspondence Officer, Royal Household.
- Leslie Edwin Chappell MVO, RVM – lately House Manager, Clarence House.
- Janet Mary Cole MVO – lately Visitor Services Manager, Royal Collection, Windsor Castle.
- Margaret Anne, Baroness Ford OBE – Former Chair, Buckingham Palace Reservicing Programme Challenge Board.
- The Reverend Neil Norman Gardner, Domestic Chaplain to The King in Scotland and Parish Minister, Canongate Kirk.
- Professor Richard Mark Leach, Physician to The King.
- Garry Keith Marsden MVO – Visitor Enterprise Manager, Sandringham Estate.
- The Reverend Canon Edmund John Newell, lately Chief Executive, Cumberland Lodge.
- Dr Kirstin Elizabeth Ostle, Apothecary to Queen Elizabeth II and to the Royal Household at Windsor Castle.
- Andrew Mark Phillips, Finance Director, Duchy of Cornwall.
- Marilyn Jean Porter MVO – lately Lieutenancy Officer for Dorset.
- Ian Malcolm Reading, Member, Royal Household’s Audit and Risk Assurance Committee.
- Dr Andrew Paul Forsythe Simpson, General Practitioner, for medical services.

==== Member of the Royal Victorian Order (MVO) ====
- Roy William Allen, Couturier and Proprietor, Mr. Roy Couture.
- Commander Robert James Dixon, RN, lately Equerry to The Prince and Princess of Wales.
- Sophie Catherine Dunbar, Employee Communications Manager, Royal Household.
- Christie Gilson, Management Accountant, Royal Household.
- Gary Lavern Gronnestad, Gilding Conservator, Royal Collection, Royal Household.
- Katherine Jane Hastings, lately Official Secretary to the Governor of Queensland.
- Sara Margaret Heaton JP – lately Course Administrator, Royal Collection Studies.
- Captain Stuart Alexander Fairlie Kaye, lately Equerry to The Princess Royal.
- Suzanne Lacy, Travel and Logistics Manager, Royal Household.
- Rebecca Louise Laurence, lately Head of Procurement, Royal Household.
- Professor Elizabeth Jane Lomas, Deputy Keeper, Duchy of Cornwall.
- Neil Duncan March, Sergeant, Metropolitan Police Service. For services to Royalty and Specialist Protection.
- Lucy Helen De Nardi, Executive Assistant to the Lord Steward, Royal Household.
- William George Oates, Page of the Chambers, Royal Household.
- Raginiben Patel, lately Operational Maintenance Co-ordinator, Royal Household.
- Jean-François Provençal CD – lately Chief of Staff and Private Secretary, Office of the Lieutenant Governor of Quebec.
- Ian Gordon John Ratcliffe, Senior Project Manager, Royal Household.
- Georgina Katherine Riddle, lately Assistant Private Secretary to The Duke and Duchess of Gloucester.
- Anna Maria Sagan, Executive Assistant to the Lord Steward, Royal Household.
- Ian Hadley Smith, Constable, Metropolitan Police Service. For services to Royalty and Specialist Protection.
- Stephen John Staines RVM – Foreman, Highgrove Estate.
- Oliver George Cooper-Watts, Senior Project Manager, Reservicing of Buckingham Palace.
- Ronald George Whitfield, Royal Visits Co-ordinator, Herefordshire and Worcestershire Lieutenancies.
- Shona Kay Williams RVM – Country Dresser to The Queen, and Assistant House Manager, Raymill.
- Irene Joy Wolstenholme, Coutts & Co. For services to the Royal Household.
- Rhian Jane Wong, Assistant Curator of Prints and Drawings, Royal Collection, Royal Household.

=== Royal Victorian Medal (RVM) ===
Ribbon of the Royal Victorian Order

Silver – Bar

- Neil Scott Mealor RVM – Warden Team Leader, Crown Estate, Windsor.
- Alan Michael Palmer RVM – Tractor Driver and Machinery Operator Crown Estate, Windsor

Silver

- Kirsty Leigh Cox, Groom, Royal Mews, Windsor Castle.
- Khushpreet Kaur Gulshan, Retail Assistant, Royal Collection, Buckingham Palace.
- Richard Nicholas Harrel, Warden, Crown Estate, Windsor.
- Caroline Ann Humby, Daily Cleaner, Frogmore House.
- Jason Vernon Hutchins, Horticulturalist, Crown Estate, Windsor.
- Katherine Elizabeth Anne Marsden, Gardener, Sandringham Estate.
- Karen Ann Napier, Daily Cleaner, Royal Mews, Windsor Castle.
- Luke James Nash, Electrician, Sandringham House.
- Timothy Roberge, Manager, Pantry Household Services, Office of the Governor-General of Canada.
- Steven Michael Taylor. For services to Royalty Protection.
- Steven John Charles Wake, Yeoman, The King’s Body Guard of the Yeomen of the Guard.
- Philip John Watkins, Constable, Metropolitan Police Service. For services to Royalty and Specialist Protection.

=== The Most Excellent Order of the British Empire ===
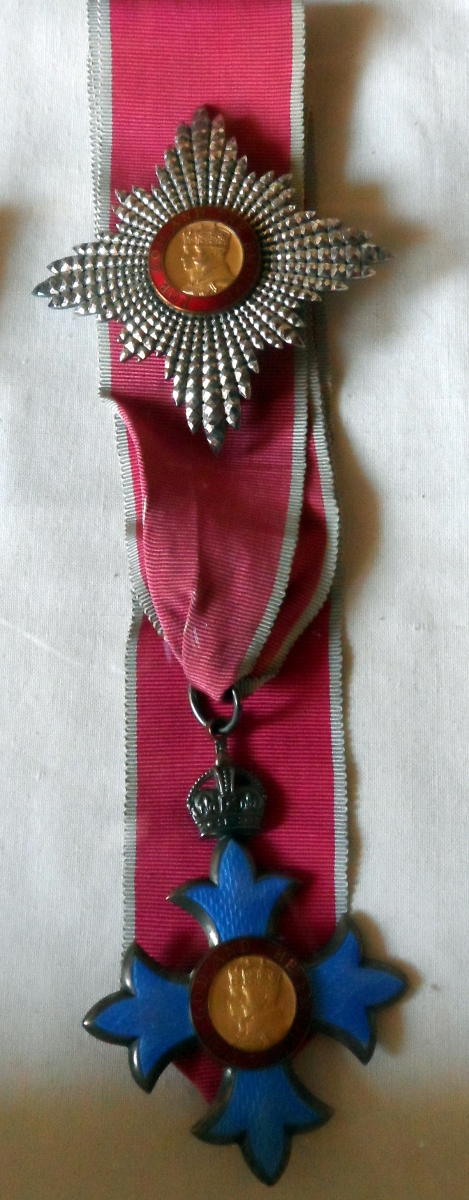
Breast star and neck badge of a Knight Commander of the Order of the British Empire

==== Knight / Dame Grand Cross of the Order of the British Empire (GBE) ====
Civil

- Dame Jacqueline Wilson DBE – Author. For services to Literature.
- Professor Sir Leszek Krzysztof Borysiewicz FRS, FRCP, FMedSci – lately Chair, Cancer Research UK. For services to Cancer Research, to Clinical Research, to Medicine and to Charities

==== Knight / Dame Commander of the Order of the British Empire (KBE / DBE) ====
Civil

- Professor Stephanie Anne Amiel – Emeritus Professor of Diabetes Research, King’s College London and Consultant Physician, King’s College Hospital NHS Foundation Trust. For services to People Living with Diabetes.
- Professor Julia Clare Buckingham CBE – lately Vice-Chancellor, Brunel University London, and lately President, Universities UK. For services to Higher Education.
- Professor Alison Mary Etheridge OBE, FRS – Professor of Probability, University of Oxford and President, Academy for Mathematical Sciences. For services to the Mathematical Sciences.
- Professor Alison Margaret Fuller – Professor, Vocational Education and Work, University College London. For services to Higher Education.
- Marie Sylvia Gabriel CBE – Chair, NHS Race and Health Observatory, Chair, Integrated Care Board and Integrated Care Partnership, NHS North East London and Associate Non-Executive Director, UK Health Security Agency. For services to Health and to Equality.
- Linda Ruth Heggs (Ruth Cairnie) – Chair, Babcock International and lately Chair, Powerful Women Initiative. For services to Industry.
- The Right Honourable Patricia Hope Hewitt – Chair, NHS Norfolk and Waveney Integrated Care Board. For services to Healthcare Transformation.
- Nicole Alison Jacobs – Domestic Abuse Commissioner, England and Wales. For services to Victims of Domestic Abuse.
- Caroline Michel – Literary Agent and Chair, Hay Festival. For services to Publishing and Literature.
- Carmen Esme Munroe OBE – Actor. For services to Drama.
- Barbara Davis Rae CBE – Artist, Colourist and Master Printmaker. For services to Art.
- The Right Honourable Emily Thornberry MP – Member of Parliament for Islington South and Finsbury, and lately Shadow Attorney General and Shadow Foreign Secretary. For Political and Public Service.
- Professor Ijeoma Florence Uchegbu FMedSci – President, Wolfson College, University of Cambridge. For services to the Chemical Sciences and to Inclusion and Diversity.

==== Commander of the Order of the British Empire (CBE) ====
Military

- Surgeon Commodore Jason Smith – Royal Navy, C036685D.
- Brigadier Jonathan Godson Eyre Bartholomew OBE – 533970.
- Major General Oliver Charles Christopher Brown – 547284.
- Colonel Mark Tyrtoff Davis – 551271.
- Brigadier Lucinda Caryl Westerman – 541649.
- Brigadier Patrick William Benjamin Wright – 557940.
- Air Commodore Nigel Timothy Bradshaw – Royal Air Force, 5206177T.
- Air Commodore Victoria Caroline McPhaden – Royal Air Force, 2659714Q.
- Air Commodore James Edwin Savage OBE – Royal Air Force, 2633340G.

===== Operational Honours =====
- Captain Benjamin Stuart Haskins OBE – Royal Navy, C040910J.

Civil

- Christopher Badger, Executive Director, Adult Care Services, Hertfordshire County Council. For services to Adult Social Care.
- Dr Jalal Bagherli, Co-Chair, Semiconductor Advisory Panel. For services to the Semiconductor Sector.
- Geoffrey Barton, lately General Secretary, Association of School and College Leaders. For services to Education.
- Humphrey William Battcock, Philanthropist, Centre for Homelessness Impact. For services to tackling Homelessness and to Education.
- Amanda Sonia Berry OBE – lately Chief Executive Officer, BAFTA. For services to the Creative Industries and to Charity.
- Karen Tracey Blackett OBE – lately President, WPP UK. For services to Advertising and to the Creative Industries.
- Dr Roger Farrant Bland OBE – Curator, Numismatist and Chair, Treasure Valuation Committee. For services to Heritage.
- David Alan Bond, lately Chief Executive Officer, Sheffield Forgemasters. For services to the Defence Supply Chain.
- Annika Victoria Bosanquet, Co-Founder, Wrapology. For services to Business.
- Sonia Penny Briscoe OBE – Chef de Mission, Paralympics GB. For services to Paralympic Sport.
- Richard Guy Bruce, Director, Office for Zero Emission Vehicles. For services to Decarbonising Transport.
- Dr Henry Otto Brünjes, Philanthropist. For services to the Arts.
- Tracey Burke, Director General, Welsh Government. For Public Service in Wales.
- Caroline Butt, Co-Founder and Chief Executive Officer, Calleva Foundation. For services to Philanthropy.
- Stephen Charles Butt, Co-Founder and Chief Executive Officer, Calleva Foundation. For services to Philanthropy.
- Patrick Ronald Guy Cauthery, Deputy Director, Aerospace and Defence, UK Export Finance. For services to Aerospace and Defence Exports.
- Deborah Chittenden, lately Director, Strategic Illegal Migration Operations, Home Office. For Public Service.
- Hannah Lucy Cockroft OBE, DL – For services to Athletics.
- Matthew Collins, Senior Policy Adviser, Cabinet Office. For Public Service.
- Alastair John De Costa, Chair, Capital City College Group, London. For services to Further Education.
- Dr Fazal Dad, Principal and Chief Executive Officer, Blackburn College, Lancashire. For services to Further Education.
- Satwant Kaur Deol, lately Principle and Chief Executive Officer, The Henley College, Oxfordshire. For services to Further Education.
- Charles Pritam Singh Dhanowa OBE, – Registrar, United Kingdom Competition Appeal Tribunal. For services to Competition Law.
- Thomas Dixon CBE – Designer. For services to Design.
- Andrew Keen-Downs, Chief Executive, Prison Advice and Care Trust (PACT). For services to Prisoners and their Families.
- Gillian Elizabeth Mary Dunion (Gillian Docherty) OBE, FRSE – lately Chief Commercial Officer, University of Strathclyde. For services to Business and Technology.
- The Right Honourable Timothy John Crommelin Eggar, Chair, North Sea Transition Authority. For services to Energy.
- Professor Nicola Townsend Fear, Co-Director, King’s Centre for Military Health Research and Academic Advisor, Office for Veterans’ Affairs, Ministry of Defence. For services to Veteran and Military Family Health.
- Professor Linda Mary Field, Emeritus Fellow, Rothamsted Research and Honorary Professor, University of Nottingham. For services to Protecting Crops and to the Environment.
- John Michael Flint, Chief Executive Officer, UK Infrastructure Bank. For Public Service.
- Rowena Mai Fyfield, Independent Non-Executive Director, The Premier League and BBC Commercial. For services to the Sports and Broadcasting Industries.
- Dr Margaret Josephine Gillespie, Deputy Director, Resilience Co-ordination Division, Ministry of Housing, Communities and Local Government. For services to Resilience, Planning, Response and Recovery.
- Stephen Frank Gosling, Chair, Liberal Democrat Business Network. For services to Business, to Politics and to Democratic Engagement.
- Poppy Clare Veronica, Baroness Gustafsson OBE – Co-Founder and Chief Executive Officer, Darktrace. For services to the Cyber Security Industry.
- Ross Fraser Haggart QFSM, lately Chief Officer, Scottish Fire and Rescue Service. For services to Fire and Rescue, and to Charitable Organisations.
- Mark Hardingham QFSM, Chair, National Fire Chiefs Council. For services to the Fire and Rescue Service.
- Robert Dennis Harris, Novelist. For services to Literature.
- Joseph Richard Harrison, Chief Executive, Milton Keynes University Hospital NHS Foundation Trust. For services to Healthcare.
- Catherine Malloy Hollern, lately Member of Parliament for Blackburn. For Parliamentary, Political and Public Service.
- Christopher Andrew Mark Katkowski KC – For services to Planning.
- Professor Francis Kelly, FMedSci, Battcock Chair in Community Health and Policy, Imperial College London. For services to Air Pollution Research and to Human Health.
- Claudia Rose Kenyatta, Director of Regions, Historic England. For services to Heritage.
- Professor Sneh Khemka, Surgeon, Business Leader, Investor and Chair, QURED, Habitual Healthcare and AllergyRhino. For services to Healthcare, to Science, to Innovation and Technology.
- Florence Kroll, Director, Children Services, Royal Borough of Greenwich, London. For services to Education.
- Sarah-Jane Abigail Lancashire OBE – Actor. For services to Drama.
- Gaynor Antoinette Legall, Chair, Anti-Racist Wales Action Plan Subgroups for Culture, Heritage and Sport. For Public Service and to Anti-Racism in Wales.
- Michael David Lewis, Chief Executive Officer, Uniper Energy. For services to Energy Security and Net Zero.
- Michelle MacLeod. For services to Criminal Justice and Law Enforcement in Scotland.
- Stephen Timothy Mallen, Founder, Zero Suicide Alliance. For services to Mental Health and Suicide Prevention.
- Ruth Selina Marks MBE – lately Chief Executive Officer, Wales Council for Voluntary Action. For services to the Voluntary Sector and to Social Partnership in Wales.
- Alice Sarah Matthews, lately Director, Delivery Unit, Prime Minister’s Office. For Public Service.
- Gerard Paul McDonald, Group Principal and Chief Executive Officer, New City College, London. For services to Further Education.
- Christine McGinness (Christine McLaughlin), Co-Director, Population Health Directorate, Scottish Government. For services to Public Health in Scotland.
- Laura Catherine McIver, lately Chief Pharmacist, Healthcare Improvement Scotland. For services to the Pharmacy Profession and to Patient Safety.
- Professor Alexander McMahon, lately Chief Nursing Officer for Scotland. For services to Nursing in Scotland.
- Stephen Roger Morrison, Founder and lately Chief Executive Officer and Chair, All3Media. For services to the Media and Creative Industries.
- Carey Hannah Mumford (Carey Mulligan), Actor. For services to Drama.
- Leena Nair, Global Chief Executive Officer, Chanel and lately Global Chief Human Resources Officer, Unilever. For services to the Retail and Consumer Sector.
- James Edwin Palmer, Senior Corporate and Governance Lawyer, Herbert Smith Freehills. For services to Business and to Law.
- Gillian Marie Parkin (Gill Riley) OBE, Managing Director, GGR Group. For services to the Lifting Industry.
- Fiona Ann Pollard, Board Member, VisitEngland Advisory Board. For services to Tourism.
- Sandy Powell OBE, Costume Designer. For services to Costume Design.
- Mayank Prakash, President, British Computing Society. For services to the Advancement of Technology Professionals.
- Martin Paul Leslie Pratt, lately Executive Director, Supporting People, Camden Council, and Chair of Trustees, Young Camden Foundation, London. For services to Children, to Young People and to Families in London.
- Anne Reid MBE, Actor. For services to Drama.
- Professor Gillian Reid, Professor of Chemistry, University of Southampton. For services to the Chemical Sciences, and to Inclusion and Diversity.
- James Timothy Richards, lately Chair, British Film Institute. For services to Film and Cinema.
- Donald Austin Robert, Chair, London Stock Exchange Group. For services to the Financial Services Industry.
- Professor Thomas Anthony Rodden FRS, FREng, Professor of Computing and lately Chief Scientific Advisor, Department for Culture, Media and Sport. For services to Science, to Technology and to Academia.
- Rebecca Margaret Salter, President, Royal Academy of Arts. For services to Art.
- Professor Maria Almudena Sevilla Sanz, Professor, Economic and Social Policy, London School of Economics. For services to Economics and to Women in Economics.
- Professor Peter David Sasieni, FMedSci, Professor of Cancer Epidemiology, Co-Lead for the Centre for Cancer Screening, Prevention and Early Diagnosis, Queen Mary University of London. For services to Cancer Early Detection and Prevention.
- Eleanor Sealy (Eleanor Kelly), lately Chief Executive, Southwark Borough Council. For services to Local Government and to the community in London.
- Louise Charlotte Smyth, Registrar of Companies and Chief Executive Officer, Companies House. For services to Public Life and to the Economy.
- Sharon Philomena Smyth, Chief Executive, Construction Procurement Delivery, Northern Ireland Civil Service. For services to Procurement.
- Christopher Alan Stark, Chief Executive, Climate Change Committee. For services to Tackling Climate Change.
- John Edward Stewart, National Director, Specialised Commissioning, NHS England. For services to the NHS.
- Professor Paul Michael Stewart, FMedSci, Professor of Medicine, University of Leeds. For services to Medical Science.
- Judge Sehba Haroon Storey, lately Principal Judge, Asylum Support Tribunal. For services to Diversity and Inclusion.
- Paul Richard Streets OBE, lately Chief Executive Officer, Lloyds Bank Foundation. For services to the Voluntary Sector.
- Professor Richard Eric Susskind OBE, KC, FRSE, lately Technology Advisor to the Lord Chief Justice of England and Wales. For services to Information Technology and to the Law.
- Professor Rahim Tafazolli, FREng., Regius Professor, University of Surrey. For services to International Mobile Communications Research.
- Purnima Murthy Tanuku OBE, Chief Executive, National Day Nurseries Association. For services to Early Years Education.
- The Honourable David Louis Taylor, Chief Executive, British Business Bank and lately Chief Executive Officer, UK Export Finance. For services to Business and Trade.
- Peter Robert Taylor OBE. For services to Journalism and to Public Service Broadcasting.
- Dr Peter Anthony Thompson, Chief Executive Officer, National Physical Laboratory. For services to Science and Technology.
- James Michael Douglas Thomson, lately Chair, City of London Police Authority Board. For services to Policing and to Inclusion.
- Alan Fred Titchmarsh MBE, DL, Horticulturalist, Author and Broadcaster. For services to Horticulture and to Charity.
- Catherine Elizabeth Lewis La Torre, lately Chief Executive Officer, British Patient Capital. For services to Business.
- Cheryl Ward, Group Chief Executive, Family Fund. For services to Social Care.
- Dr Carol Anita White OBE, Founder, International Working Group on Women and Sport, Women in Sport, and the Anita White Foundation. For services to Women and to Sport.
- Dr Alan Patrick Vincent Whitehead. For Parliamentary and Political Service.
- Janice Victoria Williams OBE, Chair, Swansea Bay University Health Board. For Public Service.
- Professor Richard Andrew Williams OBE, FREng, FRSE, Vice-Chancellor and Principal, Heriot-Watt University. For services to Education, to Engineering and to Entrepreneurship.
- Professor Florence Susan Thim Peck Wong, Professor of Diabetes and Metabolism, Cardiff University and Honorary Consultant Physician in Diabetes, University Hospital of Wales. For services to Diabetes and Metabolism

==== Officer of the Order of the British Empire (OBE) ====
Military

- Commander Stuart Crombie, Royal Navy, C041081A.
- Captain David Gillett, Royal Navy, C037720F.
- Colonel Sebastian David Burn, 561989.
- Lieutenant Colonel David Charles Groce MBE, The Royal Logistic Corps, 559583.
- Lieutenant Colonel Daniel Craig Herberts, Royal Regiment of Artillery, 555177.
- Colonel Simon Anthony Hirst, 535000.
- Colonel Anna Elizabeth Kimber, 532177.
- Lieutenant Colonel Ian Patrick Mills MBE, The Royal Logistic Corps, Army Reserve, 526379.
- Brigadier Stuart Edward Nasse, 547291.
- Colonel Andrew Richard Nicklin MBE, 555541.
- Group Captain Neill Owen Atkins, Royal Air Force, 5208475H.
- Wing Commander Russell William Barnes, Royal Air Force, 8024236B.
- Group Captain James Paul Buckle, Royal Air Force, 5208811C.
- Group Captain Trevor Robert Cade, Royal Air Force, 2659481E.
- Wing Commander Noel Jonathan Rees, Royal Air Force, 2659722C.
- Group Captain Michael John Wilson, Royal Air Force, 8029743K.

===== Operational Honours =====
- Commander Charles Anthony Collins, Royal Navy, C041435C.
- Commander Peter Alexander Evans, Royal Navy, C041590T.
- Commander Richard Lee Kemp, Royal Navy, C040775H.
- Commander Teilo John Elliot-Smith, Royal Navy, C039879W.
- Colonel Lance Gareth Foster, Corps of Royal Electrical and Mechanical Engineers, 553276.
- Wing Commander Kevin Jeffrey Terrett, Royal Air Force, 2653947L.

Civil

- Alexander William Adan, Chair, Springfield Properties plc. For services to the Construction Industry in Scotland.
- Stephen David Altschul Allan, Media Entrepreneur, Founder and Chair of Trustees, Rays of Sunshine. For services to the Media Industry and to Young People.
- Karen Alty, Headteacher, Holly Grove Special School, Burnley. For services to Education.
- Professor Sanjay Arya, Medical Director and Consultant Cardiologist, Wrightington, Wigan and Leigh Teaching Hospitals NHS Foundation Trust and Medical Director, Centre for Remediation, Support and Training. For services to Black and Minority Ethnic Doctors and Healthcare in North West England.
- Nigel Ashley, Chief Executive Officer, Elevate Multi-Academy Trust, North Yorkshire. For services to Education.
- Dean Ashton, Chief Executive Officer, Reach South Academy Trust, South West England. For services to Education.
- Ruth Lesley Bender Atik, lately National Director, The Miscarriage Association. For services to the Baby Loss Community and Bereavement Care.
- Helen Rachel Mary Backshall (Helen Glover) MBE For services to Rowing.
- Dr Thomas Bernard David Balchin, Founder and Director, The Action for Rehabilitation from Neurological Injury Stroke Charity. For services to Functional Rehabilitation after Stroke.
- Theodore BARRY, Deputy Director of Security, House of Commons. For Parliamentary and Public Service.
- Nicola Beauman, Founder, Persephone Books. For services to Publishing.
- Dr Alan James Belfield, FREng., lately Business Co-Chair, Professional Business Services Council and lately Chair, Arup. For services to Business.
- Dr Madeleine Clare Blackburn. For services to People with Life-Shortening Conditions.
- Jack Blaik, Independent Living Fund Professional Advisor, Scottish Government. For services to People with Disabilities.
- Lady (Marguerite Catherine) Hunter Blair, Chief Executive, Play Scotland. For services to Play, to Learning and to Health.
- Professor David McAllister Blaney, lately Chief Executive Officer, Higher Education Funding Council for Wales. For services to Higher Education.
- Michael Bloomfield, Chief Executive, Northern Ireland Ambulance Service. For services to Health and Social Care.
- Hina Bokhari, Co-Founder, Naz Legacy Foundation. For services to Young People, to Charity and to Inter-Faith Relations.
- Commander (Rtd.) Robert George Bosshardt, RN, lately Chief Executive, Royal Naval Benevolent Trust. For services to Veterans’ Welfare.
- Stephanie Brace, Officer, National Crime Agency. For services to Law Enforcement.
- Roderick Granville Bransgrove, lately Chair, Hampshire County Cricket Club. For services to Sport.
- Professor Christine Joyce Britch (Christine Harrison), FMedSci, Trustee, Blood Cancer UK. For services to Children with Acute Leukaemia.
- Lisa Mary Broadhurst, Programme Director, Social Security Programme. For services to Public Service Reform.
- Professor Neville Stanley Brody, Graphic Designer. For services to Design.
- John Dominic Weare Brown, Trustee, School for Social Entrepreneurs and Camara Education, and Panel Chair, Wild Frontiers Travel. For services to Charity.
- Professor Ivan Urbane Browne DL, lately Director, Public Health, Leicester City Council. For services to Public Health.
- Martin John Brundle, Sports Broadcaster. For services to Motor Racing and to Sports Broadcasting.
- Anthony John Butler, Executive Director, Derby Museums Trust. For services to the Arts.
- Calum Campbell, lately Chief Executive, NHS Lothian. For services to Healthcare in Scotland.
- Professor Gillian Clare Carr, Professor of Conflict Archaeology and Holocaust Heritage and Fellow, St Catharine’s College, University of Cambridge. For services to Holocaust Research and Education.
- Lee Castleton, Campaigner for Subpostmasters. For services to Justice.
- Carl Cavers, Founder, Sumo Group. For services to the Video Games Industry.
- Miles Celic, Chief Executive, TheCityUK. For services to Finance and Professional Services.
- John Philip Bateman-Champain, Director, The Faith and Belief Forum. For services to Faith and Integration.
- Dr Paul Anthony Chapman, Academy Director, Major Projects Leadership Academy, Oxford Saïd Business School. For services to Project Delivery.
- Shanez Cheytan, Deputy Director, Land Transport National Security, Department for Transport. For services to Rail Passengers and Transport.
- Dr Gillian Mary Chumbley, Consultant Nurse, Imperial College Healthcare NHS Trust. For services to Nursing.
- Peter Alexander Clegg, Senior Partner, Feilden Clegg Bradley Studios. For services to Architecture.
- Professor Rosemary Helen Collier, Professor of Life Sciences, University of Warwick. For services to Horticultural Science and the Technologies of Pest Control.
- Ben Commins, Executive Headteacher, Queen’s Park Early Years Federation and Queen’s Park Primary School, City of Westminster. For services to Early Years and to Education.
- Deirdra Gabrielle Conaghan. For services to Theatre and to Education for Adults with Learning Disabilities.
- Marvin Lee Cooke DL, lately Executive Vice-President, Toyota Motor Europe. For services to Automotive Manufacturing.
- Carolyn Margot Cooper, Founder and President, Limbs and Things. For services to 3D Medical Simulation Training.
- Michael Vaughan Cooper, Director, UK Co-ordinating Body, Grants Hub, Department for the Environment, Food and Rural Affairs. For Public Service.
- Dr Tracey Anne Cooper, Chief Executive, Public Health Wales NHS Trust. For services to Healthcare and to Public Health.
- Christine Cort, Managing Director, Manchester International Festival. For services to the Arts and to Culture.
- Ian Lamont Cosh, Assistant Chief Officer, Greater Manchester Police. For services to Policing.
- Simon Mark Cousins, Deputy Director, Department for Work and Pensions. For Public Service.
- Austin Christopher Daboh, Executive Vice-President, Atlantic Records UK. For services to Music.
- Susan Hilary Daley, Director, Tech and Innovation, techUK. For services to the Technology Industry.
- James Nicholas Barnard Darkins, lately Independent Non-Executive Board Member, The Crown Estate. For services to the Public Sector.
- Professor Nandini Das, Professor, Early Modern Literature and Culture and Tutorial Fellow, Exeter College, University of Oxford. For services to Interdisciplinary Research in the Humanities and to Public Engagement.
- Wendy Daunt, Deaf Studies Teacher, Royal School for the Deaf, Derby. For services to Deaf Children and to the Young Adult and Deaf Communities.
- Dharshini David, Chief Economics Correspondent, BBC and Author. For services to Economics.
- Julian Christopher David, Chief Executive Officer, techUK. For services to the Technology Industry and to Trade.
- Jacqueline Salomië MacDonald-Davis JP, Magistrate Central London Bench. For services to the Administration of Justice and to Volunteering.
- Kenneth Ernest Davy. For services to Community Rugby League Football.
- Susan Elizabeth Dawson, Commercial Director, Schools Commercial and Operations, Department for Education. For services to Education.
- Professor Margaret Anne Defeyter, Professor of Developmental Psychology and Director of the Healthy Living Lab, Northumbria University. For services to Education.
- Terence William Denham, Co-Founder, In From The Cold Project. For services to the Recognition of British and Commonwealth Casualties of the First and Second World Wars.
- Robert Michael Denham VR, Governor, HM Prison Usk and Prescoed. For Public Service.
- Julie Anne Devey, Campaigner and Co-Founder, Killed Women. For services to the Victims of Domestic Violence and their Families.
- Tarsem Singh Dhaliwal, Chief Executive Officer, Iceland Foods. For services to the Welsh Economy, Retail and Charity.
- Imtiaz Dharker, Poet, Artist and Video Film-Maker. For services to the Arts.
- Sandra Dickens (Sandra Currie), Chief Executive, Kidney Research UK. For services to Sufferers of Kidney Disease.
- Michael Thomas Donoghue, Chief Executive Officer, John Taylor Multi-Academy Trust, Staffordshire. For services to Education.
- Jasmine Dotiwala. For services to Broadcasting, to Music and to Equality, Diversity and Inclusion.
- Lucy Driver, Executive Headteacher, St. Paul’s Nursery School and Children’s Centre, Bristol, Lead at Bristol and Beyond Regional Early Years Stronger Practice Hub, and Early Years Consultant. For services to Early Years Education.
- Anne-Marie Duff, Actor. For services to Drama.
- Sarwat Tasneem Ebbett, Behavioural Change Consultant, Thrive Foundation and Volunteer. For services to Faith and to Integration.
- Mark Emmerson, Chief Executive Officer, The City of London Academies Trust and lately Principal, City Academy, London Borough of Hackney. For services to Education.
- Julian Mark Emms, Chief Executive, Berkshire Healthcare NHS Foundation Trust. For services to the NHS.
- John Arthur Evans, Executive Chair, Beanies the Flavour Company. For services to Entrepreneurship.
- David John Fairbrother, Treasury Officer of Accounts, HM Treasury. For Public Service.
- Lisa Farmer, Chief Executive, Royal British Legion Industries. For services to the Armed Forces Community.
- Abdul Karim Fatehi MBE, Chief Executive Officer, United Corporation and London Chamber of Commerce and Industry. For services to International Trade.
- Sally Fenton, lately Head, Built Environment Innovation Team, Department for Energy Security and Net Zero. For services to Net Zero Innovation.
- Dr Paul Gregory Fisher, Non-Executive Director and Chair, Audit and Risk Committee, UK Debt Management Office. For services to Public Finances.
- Professor Diana Sharman Mary Fitzsimons. For services to Housing, to a Shared Future and to Sustainable Communities in Northern Ireland.
- Justin Mark Francis, Nature Lead, Department for the Environment, Food and Rural Affairs Council for Sustainable Business and Chair, Responsible Travel Company. For services to Nature and to the Environment.
- Heather Mary Freeman, lately Head of Service, Aspire Regional Adoption Agency, Dorset. For services to Vulnerable Children and Families.
- Dr Pauline Fullerton (Pauline Wilson), Consultant Physician, Gilbert Bain Hospital, NHS Shetland. For services to Medicine in Shetland.
- Jaco-Albert Van Gass MBE For services to Cycling.
- Nicholas Charles Gazzard, Founder and Chief Executive Officer, Hollie Gazzard Trust. For services to Tackling Violence Against Women.
- Sarah Louise Godwin, Founder and Creator of Hartbeeps Music. For services to Children and Families.
- Dr David Michael Gott, Principal Toxicologist, Food Standards Agency. For services to Food Safety.
- Carole Gould, Campaigner and Co-Founder, Killed Women. For services to the Victims of Domestic Violence and their Families.
- Ann Geraldine Gow, Director, Nursing and Systems Improvement and Deputy Chief Executive, Healthcare Improvement Scotland. For services to Nursing in Scotland.
- Janet Clementine Grauberg, lately Councillor, Camden Council. For services to the community in North London and to Education.
- Margaret Elizabeth Green DL. For Voluntary Service and services to Prisoner Rehabilitation in London and Hertfordshire.
- Sarah Jane Green, Chief Executive Officer, Newcastle Gateshead Initiative. For services to Tourism.
- Carolyn Jane Griffiths, FREng., Chair, Rail Group, Parliamentary Advisory Council for Transport Safety. For services to the Rail Industry, to Transport Safety and to the Engineering Profession.
- Julian John Halligan, Senior Scientific Officer, Forensic Science Northern Ireland. For services to Justice and to Forensic Science.
- Josephine Hamilton, Campaigner for Subpostmasters. For services to Justice.
- Patricia Keiko Hamzahee, Co-Founder and Director, Black Funding Network, Co-Founder, GiveBlack and Co-Founder, Extend Ventures. For services to Philanthropy, to the Arts and to Impact Investment.
- Jermaine Hanson, Officer, National Crime Agency. For services to Law Enforcement.
- Professor John Crofton Harle, Musician. For services to Music.
- Christopher David Head, Campaigner for Subpostmasters. For services to Justice.
- Andrew Headley. For services to Educational Philanthropy and to Charity.
- Ruth Florence Hollis, Chief Executive Officer, Spirit of 2012. For services to Sport, to the Arts and to Volunteering.
- Alexander Holmes, Deputy Chief Executive Officer, The Diana Award. For services to Young People.
- Dr Matthew Craig Hort, Principal Fellow, Atmospheric Dispersion and Air Quality, Met Office. For services to Atmospheric Dispersion Science and Emergency Response.
- John Rhys Howells, Director, Welsh Government. For services to the Welsh Language.
- Paul David Hudson, lately Planning Advisor, Ministry of Housing, Communities and Local Government. For services to Town Planning.
- James Philip Hygate, Chief Executive Director, Green Fuels Ltd. and Firefly Green Fuels Ltd. For services to Low Carbon Fuels.
- Ronald Hynd, Dancer and International Choreographer. For services to Dance.
- Susan Jacques, Chief Executive, County Durham and Darlington NHS Foundation Trust. For services to the NHS.
- Professor Nicholas Jenkins, FREng., Professor of Renewable Energy, Cardiff University. For services to Renewable Energy and to Smart Grid Technologies.
- Professor Philip Douglas Jones, Professorial Fellow, Climatic Research Unit, University of East Anglia. For services to Climatology.
- Ian Karet. For Charitable and Public Service.
- Dr Mohamed Raouf Abdul Karim Al-Kattan, FREng., Founder, Safinah Ltd. and Member, Board of Directors, I-Tech AB. For services to Marine Engineering.
- Dr Matthew John Kearney, General Practitioner and Innovation Advisor, UCLPartners. For services to Health and to the Prevention of Cardiovascular Disease.
- Tully Alicia Jacqueline Kearney MBE For services to Swimming.
- Dr Alex Guy Kendall, Co-Founder and Chief Executive Officer, Wayve. For services to Artificial Intelligence.
- Erin Mairead Kennedy MBE. For services to Rowing and to Breast Cancer Awareness.
- John William Kennedy, Scouts Scotland Treasurer and Volunteer. For services to Scouting and to Young People.
- Mark Anthony Kennedy, Deputy Director, Maritime Operations, Home Office. For services to Border Security.
- Professor Louise Archer Ker, Karl Mannheim Chair, Professor of Sociology of Education, University College London. For services to Education.
- Joanna Elizabeth Killian, Chief Executive, Local Government Association and lately Chief Executive, Surrey County Council. For services to Local Government.
- Samantha May Kinghorn MBE. For services to Athletics.
- Monica Kohli, President, Women’s International Shipping and Trading Association UK and Chair, Indian Maritime Association UK. For services to Promoting Diversity in the Maritime Industry.
- Debbie Lane, Founder and Chief Executive Officer of the LGBT+ Cymru Helpline & Progress Cymru Counselling. For services to Inclusion, to Employment, to the LGBT+ Community and to Saving Young Lives Jonathan Robert ROSENORN-LANNG, Head, Operational Policy and Response, Home Office. For Public Service.
- Mark John Scott Lawrie, Chief Executive Officer, Street Games and Chair of Trustees, Personal Best Foundation. For services to Education and to Young People.
- Peter Thornton Laybourn, Chair and Founder, International Synergies. For services to the Green Economy and to Climate Action through Industrial Symbiosis.
- Roger John Leighton, Chief Executive Officer, Partnership Learning. For services to Education.
- Lynette Leith, Vice-Principal for Curriculum and Skills, Hull College. For services to Further Education.
- Jennifer Mary Julie Leonard, Director of Operational Policing Law, Metropolitan Police Service. For services to Policing and to National Security.
- Professor Andrew Levers, Executive Director and Founder, Institute of Digital Engineering and Autonomous Systems, University of Liverpool. For services to Industry and to the Economy.
- Simon Lewis, Team Leader, Ministry of Defence. For services to Defence.
- Professor Yaojun Li, Professor of Sociology, University of Manchester. For services to the Advancement of Knowledge in Social Mobility and to Ethnic Integration.
- Lieutenant Colonel Thomas James Limb, lately Policy Adviser, Cabinet Office. For Public Service.
- Carol Laurette Linforth MBE For Political and Public Service.
- Dr Kay Catherine Sheila Hilary Linnell, Forensic Accountant, Expert Witness and Key Adviser to the Justice for Subpostmasters Alliance. For services to Justice.
- Richard Livesey, Scientific Adviser, Ministry of Defence. For services to Defence.
- Michael Jack Livingston, Deputy Director, Major Sporting Events and Delivery, Department for Culture, Media and Sport. For services to Holocaust Education and to Public Service.
- David Edward Lloyd, lately Police and Crime Commissioner, Hertfordshire. For services to Public Safety.
- Eleanor Rose Lloyd, Theatre Producer and lately President, Society of London Theatre. For services to Theatre.
- Soumya Majumdar, Head of Unit, Proceeds of Crime Division, Crown Prosecution Service. For services to Law and Order.
- Rosie Marr, Deputy Director, Cabinet Office. For Public Service.
- Edward Maurice Charles Marsan, Actor. For services to Drama.
- Anthony John Martin, lately Touch Judge, Rugby Super League. For services to Rugby League Football.
- Dr Christopher Martin DL For services to the Maritime and Port Sector.
- Wendy Joan Martin, Director, National Trading Standards. For services to Consumer Safety and to Business.
- Craig Adam Maxwell. For voluntary and charitable services to Improving Outcomes for People with Cancer.
- Elizabeth McAtear, Volunteer, Western Isles. For services to the Western Isles.
- Gordon Alastair McFarlane, lately Consultant General Surgeon, Gilbert Bain Hospital, Shetland. For services to Rural Healthcare in Scotland.
- John Brian McGrath, Life President, Cicely Saunders International. For services to Charity and to Education.
- George Alexander Sutherland McIvor, Chef and Chair, Master Chefs of Great Britain. For services to the Catering and Tourism Industries, and to Charitable Fundraising.
- Gordon Leonard McNicoll. For Public Service in Scotland.
- David Louis Mearns, Oceanographer, Marine Scientist and Wreck Finder. For services to the Location and Recovery of Historic Shipwrecks.
- Dr Emma Louise Meredith, Director General, The Cosmetic, Toiletry and Perfumery Association. For services to Business and Consumers.
- The Right Honourable Alun Edward Michael JP, lately Police and Crime Commissioner, South Wales. For services to Public Safety.
- Dr Gail Kathryn Miflin, Chief Medical Officer, NHS Blood and Transplant. For services to Blood and Plasma Services.
- Geoffrey Arthur Miles DL. For services to the Business and Voluntary Sectors.
- Mark Richard Mills DL, Businessman and Philanthropist. For services to Business and to Charity.
- Seema Misra, Campaigner for Subpostmasters. For services to Justice.
- Ian Frederick Moore JP, Chief Executive Officer, Fire Industry Association. For services to the Fire Industry and to Public Safety.
- Fiona Morey, Executive Principal, South Bank Colleges, London. For services to Further Education.
- Professor Mary Susanna Morgan FBA., Historian and Philosopher of Economics. For services to the Economics Profession and to Social Science.
- Katrina Elizabeth Morley, Chief Executive Officer, Tees Valley Education Trust, North Yorkshire. For services to Education.
- Emma Jane Morris, Solicitor to the Infected Blood Inquiry, Cabinet Office. For Public Service.
- David William Moyes, lately Manager, West Ham United Football Club. For services to Association Football.
- Simon James Murphy, lately Chief Executive Officer, Battersea Power Station Development Company. For services to Real Estate, to Heritage and to the community in London.
- Jill Rhian Nalder. For services to People with AIDS and HIV.
- Paul Norris, Team Leader, Ministry of Defence. For services to Defence.
- Marianela Núñez, Dancer. For services to Dance.
- Dr Eamonn Sean O'Neal DL. For services to Charitable Causes and to People with Disabilities in North West England.
- Caroline Erica O'Neill, Children’s Improvement Adviser, Local Government Associations. For services to Education.
- David Oldfield, lately Interim Group Chief Operating Officer, Lloyds Banking Group. For services to Workplace Mental Health and Well-being, and to Disability.
- Professor Rachel Angharad Oliver, FREng., Professor of Materials, University of Cambridge. For services to Materials Engineering.
- Professor Richard Okagbue Chude Oreffo, FMedSci, lately Chair of Musculoskeletal Science, University of Southampton. For services to Education Equality and to Musculoskeletal Science.
- Professor Robert Mark Ormerod, Deputy Vice-Chancellor and Provost, Keele University. For services to Education and to Sustainability.
- Zoë Osmond, Chief Executive Officer, GambleAware. For services to Tackling Gambling Harms.
- Dr Petra Claire Farquhar Oyston, Fellow, Defence Science and Technology Laboratory. For services to Science and Defence.
- Professor Shahina Pardhan, Founding Director, Vision and Eye Research Institute, Anglia Ruskin University. For services to Optometry and Preventing Blindness.
- Ushma Manhar Patel MBE, Prime Minister’s Diary Manager, Prime Minister’s Office. For Public Service.
- Professor Hugh Henry Patterson, Professor Emeritus of Politics, Ulster University. For services to Education and to Peacebuilding in Northern Ireland.
- Professor Douglas John Paul, FRSE, Professor of Semiconductor Devices, James Watt School of Engineering, University of Glasgow. For services to Quantum Technologies Research.
- Laurence Anthony Pears, Capability Adviser, Ministry of Defence. For services to Defence.
- Caroline Pemberton, Head of Resourcing, People Function, Ministry of Justice. For services to the Criminal Justice System.
- Professor Nathalie Pettorelli, Head, Environmental Monitoring and Conservation Modelling, Zoological Society of London. For services to Conservation and to Outreach.
- Thomas Pidcock MBE. For services to Cycling.
- Timothy Henry Ralph Porter, lately Chair, Blue Cross. For services to Animal Welfare.
- Gian Singh Power, Founder and Chief Executive Officer, TLC Lions. For services to Mental Health.
- Robert Purvis, Director, Purvis Plants Hire. For services to the community in Fife.
- Richard John Quallington, lately Executive Director, Action with Communities in Rural England. For services to Rural Communities.
- Sravya Rao, Deputy Director, Economy and Strategic Analysis, Department for Business and Trade. For Public Service.
- Ubaid-ul Rehman, Senior Diversity and Inclusion Advisor, College of Policing and Co-Founder, Imaan and Chair, Goslings Badminton Club. For services to Equality in the LGBTQ+ Community.
- Professor Rosalind Emily Mayors Rickaby, F.R.S., Chair of Geology, Oxford Earth Sciences, University of Oxford. For services to Biogeochemistry.
- Michelle Riddalls, Chief Executive Officer, PAGB, the Consumer Healthcare Association. For services to Consumer Health.
- Dr Paul Christopher Roberts, Archaeologist and lately Keeper of Antiquities, The Ashmolean Museum. For services to Archaeology and to Heritage.
- Victoria Jane Robertshaw, Founder, Green Street. For services to the Retail Sector.
- David Robson, Team Leader, Ministry of Defence. For services to Defence.
- Kathryn Marian Roe, lately Deputy Director, Department for Science, Innovation and Technology. For services to Cyber Security.
- Lauren Rachel Catherine Rowles MBE. For services to Rowing.
- Dr Joan Rutherford, Chief Medical Member, Health Education and Social Care Chamber (Mental Health), First Tier Tribunal. For services to the Administration of Justice.
- Mandeep Kaur Sanghera, Project Manager and Philanthropist, Coventry. For services to Refugee Resettlement.
- Professor Safa Taha Al-Sarraj, Head of Clinical Neuropathology, King’s College Hospital NHS Foundation Trust. For services to Medicine, particularly to Neuropathology.
- Elizabeth Jane Harris-Sawczenko, Interfaith Adviser, Forum for Peace UK and Board of Deputies of British Jews. For services to Interfaith Engagement.
- Duncan William Macnaughton Scott MBE. For services to Swimming.
- Hawa Daboh Sesay, Executive Director, Hawa Trust Foundation. For services to the Prevention of Violence Against Women and Girls.
- Savraj Singh Sidhu, Assistant Head, Ukraine Task Force, Security Policy and Operations, Ministry of Defence. For services to Defence.
- Amos Simbo, Founder, Black Professionals In Construction. For services to the Construction Industry and to Diversity.
- Dr Tobias Simpson, Director, Wiener Holocaust Library. For services to Holocaust Memorial.
- Peter William Smallwood, lately President, National Conservative Convention. For Political and Public Service.
- Colonel (Rtd.) Audrey Jean Smith, Life Vice-President and Trustee, Women’s Royal Army Corps Association. For services to Female Veterans.
- John Geoffrey Smith, Chief Executive Officer, GB Railfreight. For services to Rail Freight Transport.
- Kathryn Anne Smith, Chief Executive, Social Care Institute for Excellence. For services to Social Care.
- Louise Marie Smith, Chair, Innovate Finance. For services to the Fintech Industry and to the Empowerment of the LGBTQIA+ Community.
- Daniela Luminita Denis-Smith, Founder and Chief Executive Officer, Obelisk Support. For services to Women in the Legal Profession.
- Romilly Le Quesne Saumarez Smith, Jeweller. For services to the Arts.
- Thomas Solloway, Team Leader, Ministry of Defence. For services to Defence.
- Nicola Solomon, lately Chief Executive, Society of Authors, and lately Chair, Creators’ Rights Alliance. For services to Literature and to the Creative Industries.
- Simon Paul Spinks, Chief Executive, Harrison Spinks Group. For services to the Mattress and Bed Industry.
- Smruti Sriram, Chief Executive Officer, Supreme Creations (Bags of Ethics). For services to Fashion.
- Professor Stephen Strand. For services to Equality and to Human Rights.
- Alice Rose Tai MBE. For services to Swimming.
- Rebecca Margaret Mary Thomson, Journalist, Computer Weekly. For services to Justice.
- Susan Margaret Tobbell, Philanthropist. For services to Charity.
- Professor Elizabeth Sarah Todd, Professor, Educational Inclusion, Newcastle University. For services to Education and to Young People.
- Heidi Rebecca Elizabeth Travis, lately Chief Executive, Sue Ryder. For services to Palliative, Neurological and Bereavement Care Services.
- Kevin Hugh Tumelty, Head of Security, Senedd Cymru. For services to Public and Parliamentary Security.
- Olivia Rose Tunnell, Assistant Head Ukraine Task Force, Security Policy and Operations, Ministry of Defence. For services to Defence.
- Karen Turner, Senior Operational Support Manager, H.M. Prison and Probation Service Wales. For Public Service.
- Louisa Jane Walker (Louisa Harrison-Walker), Chief Executive, Sheffield Chamber of Commerce. For services to Business and the Economy in South Yorkshire.
- Susan Christine Waterson, Head of Investment, North of England, Department for Business and Trade. For services to Trade and Investment in the North of England.
- Sandra Gwendoline Watson, lately Children and Families Manager, H.M. Prison Oakwood, G4S Care and Justice Services Ltd. For services to the Criminal Justice System.
- Steven John Wearne, Director of Global Affairs, Food Standards Agency and Chair of Codex. For services to Public Health Protection and to International Food Safety.
- Deirdre Anne Webb, lately Assistant Director of Nursing for Healthcare. For services to Women, Children and Families in Northern Ireland.
- Dr David Edward Weber, President Emeritus, International Self-Care Foundation. For services to Healthy Lifestyles and Self-Care.
- Professor Susan Christina Welburn, Professor of Medical and Veterinary Molecular Epidemiology, University of Edinburgh. For services to One Health Research and to Disease Elimination.
- Dr Thomas Phillip Wells, Deputy Director, Government Office for Science. For services to Science in Government.
- Sally Ann Weston, lately Deputy Director, Home Office. For Public Service.
- Kevin Whately, Actor. For services to Drama and to Charity.
- Vanessa Havard-Williams. For services to Legal and Financial Services, to Public Finance and to Tackling Climate Change.
- Roger Ian Wilson, Chief Executive, Armagh City, Banbridge and Craigavon Borough Council. For Public Service in Northern Ireland.
- Estelle Marilyn, The Lady Wolfson of Marylebone, Philanthropist. For services to Medical Research and to the Arts
- Stephen Woodard, lately Deputy Secretary General, European Conservatives and Reformists Group, European Parliament. For Political and Public Service.
- Georgina Worrall, Head, POWERful Women. For services to Diversity and Inclusion in the Energy Sector.
- William Wright, lately Chair, Haemophilia Scotland. For services to People with Bleeding Disorders and to the Infected Blood Inquiry.
- Dr Wei Yang, Chief Executive Officer and Co-Founder, Digital Task Force for Planning and Chair, Construction Industry Council. For services to the Town Planning Industry.
- Margaret Yates, Chief Executive Officer, All Saints Catholic Collegiate, Stoke-on-Trent. For services to Education.
- Professor Zaheer Raza Yousef, Consultant Cardiologist, University Hospital of Wales. For services to the Treatment of Heart Failure.

==== Member of the Order of the British Empire (MBE) ====
Military

- Leading Hand (Intelligence) Chloe Niki Rebecca Macdonald, Royal Navy, 30229430.
- Warrant Officer Class 1 Nicholas Alexander Twomey Ollive, Royal Marines, P057614X.
- Petty Officer Engineering Technician (Marine Engineering Submarines) David Smee, Royal Navy, D262557Q.
- Lieutenant Colonel Christopher Robert Spratt, Volunteer Cadet Corps, 30278245.
- Commander Robert Steadman, Royal Navy, C037923R.
- Warrant Officer Class 2 Yvonne Angus, Adjutant General’s Corps (Royal Military Police), W1047961.
- Major Roger Thomas Anstey, Army Air Corps, 561034.
- Colonel Russell Guy Atherton, 553131.
- Warrant Officer Class 2 Lee Owen Backhouse, The Coldstream Guards, Army Reserve, 24901438
- Warrant Officer Class 2 Stewart Baird, The King’s Royal Hussars, Army Reserve, 24879688.
- Warrant Officer Class 2 Paul Raymond Barnes, Adjutant General’s Corps (Staff and Personnel Support Branch), 24954065.
- Major James Terence Richard Blakemore, The Rifles, 30079495.
- Sergeant Alan Gary Boyle, The Mercian Regiment, Army Reserve, 25024349.
- Lieutenant Colonel Mark Howard Kearton Bulmer VR, Corps of Royal Engineers, Army Reserve, 551123.
- Sergeant Michael Andrew Chadwick, The Scots Guards, 30070431.
- Captain Edward James Clinton, The Royal Logistic Corps, 25202583.
- Lieutenant Colonel David Joseph Cotton, Adjutant General’s Corps (Army Legal Services Branch), 563174.
- Major Jonathan George Stewart-Davis, Army Air Corps, 559209.
- Lieutenant Colonel Kathleen Douglas, Army Cadet Force, 544717.
- Major Ian Lindsay Elliott, Royal Corps of Signals, Army Reserve, 24737035.
- Captain Olivia Kate Flaherty, Royal Corps of Signals, 30185101.
- Lieutenant Colonel Thomas Andrew Hugh Giffard, The Life Guards, 548628.
- Captain Daniel Henderson, The Royal Regiment of Fusiliers, 25101579.
- The Reverend Ann Elizabeth Hitchiner, Chaplain to the Forces (Third Class), Royal Army Chaplains’ Department, Army Reserve, 30230592.
- Sergeant Gareth Huw Russell Jenkins VR, Royal Monmouthshire Royal Engineers (Militia), Army Reserve, 30127906.
- Lieutenant Colonel Ryan Chappell Mallin, Royal Army Medical Service, 564181.
- Major Sean Patrick Maloney, Corps of Royal Electrical and Mechanical Engineers, 30089172.
- Lieutenant Colonel Alexander Harry Law Michael, The King’s Royal Hussars, 549576.
- Major Thomas Frederick William Mortensen, The Scots Guards, 30143084.
- Staff Sergeant David Andrew Colin Murphy, Royal Tank Regiment, 25219931.
- Lieutenant Colonel Alexander James Rabbitt, The Royal Welsh, 565348.
- Major David Thomas Rainbow, Adjutant General’s Corps (Royal Military Police), 25052806.
- Major Mark Bryan Roberts, Corps of Royal Electrical and Mechanical Engineers, 30036628.
- Major Daniel Mark Rouse, Corps of Royal Engineers, P904120R.
- Sergeant Merini Marilynn Rokowati Helena Sevakasiga, Adjutant General’s Corps (Staff and Personnel Support Branch), W1045771.
- Lieutenant Colonel Adam Michael Shindler, Intelligence Corps, 25215051
- Major Robert James Smith, The Princess of Wales’s Royal Regiment, 30172636.
- Major Andrew Robert Sutton, Royal Corps of Signals, Army Reserve, 30330148.
- Captain Marcus James Waugh, Corps of Royal Electrical and Mechanical Engineers, 25036853.
- Major Joshua William Knight Wray, Corps of Royal Engineers, 30089160.
- Corporal Olivia Brindley, Royal Air Force, 30228630.
- Warrant Officer Philip Andrew Chadwick, Royal Air Force, R8209253.
- Wing Commander Rebecca Jean Collis, Royal Air Force, 30031414.
- Flight Sergeant Jane Corban, Royal Air Force, 30141108.
- Squadron Leader Simon Anthony Devenish, Royal Air Force, 5207260R.
- Squadron Leader Dusko Maurice Kent Frost, Royal Air Force, 8700362S.
- Flight Lieutenant James Edward Laird, Royal Air Force, 30386340.
- Wing Commander Charles Jeremy Lynn, Royal Air Force, 2644198D.
- Wing Commander Richard Alan May, Royal Air Force, 8301028E.
- Squadron Leader James Palfrey, Royal Air Force, 30002982.
- Chief Technician Bradley Parry, Royal Air Force, 30000177
- Squadron Leader Andrew John Sweeny, Royal Air Force, 30067190.
- Flight Sergeant Philip Michael Thomas, Royal Air Force, F8512450.

===== Operational Honours =====
- Lieutenant Commander John Richard Escott Gabb, Royal Navy, 30044836.
- Chief Petty Officer Warfare Specialist (Tactical Submarines) Russell Eric Green, Royal Navy, 30064364.
- Lieutenant Commander Charles Anthony Graesser Thornton, Royal Navy, 30017101.
- Major Cameron George McVean Gubbins, The Light Dragoons, 30064440.
- Major Gemma Elizabeth Simister, Corps of Royal Engineers, W1049474.
- Squadron Leader Simon Scott Bracewell, Royal Air Force, 30069337.

Civil

- Professor Bamidele Adebisi. Head, Smart Infrastructure and Industry Research Group, Manchester Metropolitan University. For services to Knowledge Transfer.
- Ruth Mary Agnew. Chief Governance and Central Support Officer, Co-Op Academies Trust. For services to Education.
- Joanne Elizabeth Ahmed. Tax Partner, Deloitte. For services to Business and Trade.
- Emily Rose Aidin. Founder and Chief Executive Officer, Art History Link-Up. For services to Art History and to Young People.
- Eleanor Aldridge. For services to Sailing.
- Mark George Alexander. Higher Executive Officer, Department for Work and Pensions. For services to Promoting Socio-Economic Diversity.
- Usman Ali. Multi Agency Public Protection Arrangements Administrator and Disability Champion, Bradford Probation Service, HM Prison and Probation Service. For Public Service.
- Janice Louise Allen. Principal, Fivemiletown College. For services to Education in Northern Ireland.
- Timothy Andrew Allen. Director, Access to Cash and Branch Services, Barclays and Non-Executive Director, Cash Access UK. For services to the Cash and Banking Sectors.
- Margaret Elizabeth Deirdre Amor. For services to the community in Northern Ireland.
- Laurence Anderson. Team Leader, Ministry of Defence. For services to Defence.
- Lola Anderson. For services to Rowing.
- Eleanor Sarah Angel. Trustee, Association of Jewish Refugees. For services to Holocaust Memorial.
- Wendy Ansell. Specialist Midwife, Cardiff and Vale University Health Board. For services to Survivors of Harmful Practices and to Women Seeking Sanctuary.
- Miranda Abigail Appleton. Principal, Hereford College of Arts. For services to Further Education.
- Edward Peter Archer. For services to Heritage and to the community in Clydesdale.
- Gillian Yvonne Arukpe. Founder and Group Chief Executive, Social Interest Group and Chief Executive Officer, Penrose. For services to Charity and Mental Health.
- Parveen Asam. Foster Carer, London Borough of Redbridge. For services to Foster Care.
- Matilda Asante-Owusu. Sickle Cell Community Matron, Sickle Cell and Thalassaemia Centre, Whittington Health NHS Trust. For services to Nursing.
- Geraldine Rachel Asher-Smith. For services to Athletics.
- Professor Keyoumars Ashkan. Consultant Neurosurgeon, King’s College Hospital NHS Foundation Trust. For services to Neurosurgery.
- Dawn Lesley Astle. Founder, The Jeff Astle Foundation. For services to Footballers with Dementia.
- Pamela Murray Jollie Auld. Lately Senior Dental Nurse. For services to Dental Nursing and to Patient Welfare in Scotland.
- Michael Paul Anthony Bailey. Managing Director, Col-Tec Solutions Ltd. For services to the Print Industry and Allied Trades.
- Thomas Stewart Baker. Actor and Writer. For services to Television.
- Hayley Dawn Bangs. For services to the community in the Kyle of Sutherland, Ross-shire and Caithness.
- Dr Katherine Pamela Barclay. Board Member, Institute for Apprenticeships and Technical Education. For services to Education and Skills.
- Kumar Basu. Honorary Chair and Volunteer, British Computer Society, North, Central and South London Branches. For services to Young People and the Promotion of Science and Technology.
- Katherine Jane Batts. Lately Treasurer, City of Rochester Swimming and Lifeguard Club. For Voluntary Service to Swimming and to the Royal Life Saving Society.
- Trevor Frank Beattie. Lately Chief Executive, South Downs National Park Authority. For services to the Natural Environment.
- Katherine Beggs. Northern Ireland Director, National Lottery Community Fund. For services to Public and Community Services in Northern Ireland.
- Philip Martin Benham. Chair, Friends of the National Railway Museum. For services to Railway Heritage.
- Michael Bennion. For services to Scouting and to Young People.
- Professor Vladlena Benson. Professor Aston Business School, Cyber Security Innovation Research Centre. For services to Cyber Security.
- Dr James Biddulph. Lately Headteacher, University of Cambridge Primary School, Cambridge. For services to Education.
- Claire Louise Biggar. Inclusion and Wellbeing Consultant and Military Public Engagement Lead, Edinburgh Napier University. For services to Education.
- Moawia Bin-Sufyan JP FRSA. For services to Community Cohesion and Inter-Faith Relations in South Wales.
- Nicholas James Bird. Chair of Trustees, Solving Kids' Cancer UK. For services to Paediatric Oncology Patients and to Research Advocacy.
- Luke Robert Black. Chair, LGBT Conservatives. For Political Service.
- William Ivan Black. For services to Charitable Fundraising in Northern Ireland.
- Rachel Denise Blackburn. Chief Executive Officer, US2U Consulting Ltd. For services to the Business Community and to Exports.
- Dr Julie Vanessa Blake. Co-Director, Poetry by Heart. For services to Education.
- Judith Anne Boichot. For services to the community in Dorset.
- Helen Margaret Bonnick. Specialist, Child to Parents Violence and Abuse. For services to Families.
- Nicola Jane Bowdidge. Co-Founder and Chief Executive Officer, The Tom Bowdidge Youth Cancer Foundation. For charitable services to Young People Suffering from Cancer.
- Richard Charles Frank Bowdidge. Co-Founder and Chair, Board of Trustees, The Tom Bowdidge Youth Cancer Foundation. For charitable services to Young People Suffering from Cancer.
- Tracey Bowers. Team Leader, Joint Casualty and Compassionate Centre Commemorations Team, Ministry of Defence. For services to the Armed Forces Community.
- Barbara Mary Boyd. Founder, Hadleigh Thrift Shop. For services to Charitable Fundraising and to the community in Hadleigh, Suffolk.
- The Very Reverend Mark Christopher Boyling. For services to Carlisle Cathedral and to the community in Cumbria.
- Kevin Bradburne. Operations Director, Youth Federation. For services to Young People.
- George Alan Craig Bradshaw. For services to Education in Northern Ireland.
- Peter Lawson Bradwick. Wood Turner. For services to the Craft of Wood Turning.
- Anna Brailsford. Chief Executive Officer, Code First Girls. For services to Women’s Equality and Diversity in Coding.
- Stanley Rupert Brathwaite. Lately Accommodation Specialist, Royal Air Force Families Federation. For services to Royal Air Force Personnel and their Families.
- Georgina Megan Brayshaw. For services to Rowing.
- Christine Ellen Brazil. Lately Staff Member, Labour Party. For Political Service.
- Joeli Brearley. Founder and Chief Executive Officer, Pregnant Then Screwed. For services to Working Families.
- Michael Jonathan Brett Young DL. For services to Veterans and to the Vulnerable in Sutherland.
- Professor Paul Martin Brickell. Lately Executive Director of Regeneration and Community Partnerships, London Legacy Development Corporation. For services to the Regeneration of East London.
- Patricia Ann Brittain. Retail Volunteer, Royal Voluntary Service James Cook Hospital. For Charitable Services.
- Esther Mary Brittan. For voluntary and charitable services to Young People.
- Daniel David Brookbank. For services to the community in Brighton and East Sussex.
- Hannah Christina Broughton. Co-founder and Creator, Twinkleboost CIO and Therapeutic Forest CIC, and Climbing Calm CIC. For services to Children and Young People and their Families.
- Desmond Maximillian McGrath Brown. Founder, Growing Futures UK and Chair, Independent Scrutiny of Police Powers Panel, Avon and Somerset Police. For services to the community in Avon and Somerset.
- Eric James Alexander Brown. Chair, South East Fermanagh Foundation (SEFF). For services to the community in County Fermanagh.
- Professor Keith Lawson Brown. Lately Independent Chair, Safeguarding Adult National Network. For services to Adult Safeguarding.
- Paul Alexander Buchanan. Lately Director, Delivery and Impact, Business in the Community; Chair of the Board of Trustees, The Boxing Academy and Trustee, John Lewis Foundation. For services to Charity.
- Sarah Ann Bucks. Member, South Somerset Bridleways Association and the British Horse Society. For services to the Public Rights of Way Network.
- Jane Burt. Team Leader, Ministry of Defence. For services to Defence.
- Paul Caddick. Founder, Caddick Group and Co-Founder, Leeds Rugby Limited. For services to Sport.
- Jennifer Caguioa. Lately International Recruitment and Ethnic Minorities Nurse Advisor, NHS England and lately Head, Global Florence Nightingale Foundation. For services to Nursing.
- Dr Matthew Joseph Cain. Writer and Broadcaster. For services to LGBTQ+ Culture.
- Marissa James Callaghan. Footballer. For services to Association Football and to the community in Northern Ireland.
- Alexander Angus Cameron. Co-Chair, High Street Heritage Action Zone and Co-Chair, Intra Community Trust. For services to Heritage and the community in Kent.
- Beverley Campbell. Family Participation Officer, Family Rights Group. For services to Kinship Care.
- The Hon. Nicole Mary Campbell. Trustee, The Tavistock Trust for Aphasia. For services to People with Aphasia.
- Kevin Camplin. For services to Mountain Rescue in Lancashire.
- Stuart Geoffrey Cannon. Chair, Kames Fish Farming Ltd. For services to the Sustainable Development of the Aquaculture Industry in Scotland.
- Timothy Charles Cantell. For services to Heritage and to the Environment.
- Sophie Ellen Capewell. For services to Cycling.
- Graham Carlisle. Foster Carer, Sunderland Local Authority. For services to Foster Care.
- Jayne Carlisle. Foster Carer, Sunderland Local Authority. For services to Foster Care.
- Dr Amanda Jean Carson. Lately Small Ruminant Expert Group Lead, Animal and Plant Health Agency. For services to Farming and to the Protection of Rare Breeds.
- Joel Castellvi-Kellhofer. Entrepreneur, Advocate and Innovator. For services to the Deaf Community.
- Jonathan Charlesworth. Co-Founder and Executive Director, Educational Action Challenging Homophobia. For services to Education, to Health, to Criminal Justice and to HM Government.
- Mohammed Younis Chaudhry. Owner and Founder, Regal Food Products Plc. For services to Business and to the community in Bradford.
- Dr Rowena Christmas. Chair RCGP Wales and GP Principal, RCGP Wales and Wye Valley Practice. For services to General Practice.
- Adrian Christy. Chief Executive Officer, Table Tennis England. For services to Table Tennis.
- David Peter Clarkson. Director, Ofcom. For services to Telecommunications.
- Stephen Clegg. For services to Swimming.
- Catherine Mary Clifford. Director, Rural Community Network. For services to Rural Communities and to Peace Building in Northern Ireland.
- Janet Edith Nkabidwa Collyer. Chair, Quantum Dice. For services to Quantum Hardware and Cyber Security.
- Barbara Colombo. Foster Carer, TACT Yorkshire. For services to Foster Care.
- Robert Ernest Colombo. Foster Carer, TACT Yorkshire. For services to Foster Care.
- Dr Mine Conkbayir. Early Years Researcher and Author. For services to Early Years.
- Kerry-Anne Cooper. Police Chaplin, Hertfordshire Constabulary. For services to the community in Hemel Hempstead.
- Michael John Pudner Cope. President, Ebbw Vale Cricket Club and Football Club. For services to Sport, Health and Wellbeing.
- David Andrew Corfield. Chief Executive Officer, Prismatic Ltd. For services to the Defence Industry and to Aviation.
- Margo Cornish. For services to Cancer Charities.
- Dr Jocelyn Susannah Cornwell. Lately Chair, Action Against Medical Accidents. For services to Patients’ Experience of Care and to Patient Safety.
- Joseph Thomas Corrigan. For services to Charitable Fundraising.
- Dr Lisa Ann Cotterill. Executive Director, National Institute for Health Research Academy. For services to Health Research.
- Marimouttou Coumarassamy. Deputy Chief Operating Officer, Birmingham and Solihull Mental Health NHS Foundation Trust, and Founder and Chair, British Indian Nurse Association. For services to Supporting International Nurses.
- Dimitri Coutya. For services to Fencing.
- James Coyle. Chair of Trustees, Blessed Holy Family Catholic Academy Trust, London Borough of Harrow. For services to Education.
- Emily Elizabeth Craig. For services to Rowing.
- Dr Gary Craig. Inspector, Police Service for Northern Ireland. For Public and Charitable Service.
- Jennifer Fraser Craw. Chief Executive, Opportunity North East. For services to the Economy in the North East of Scotland.
- Hilary Maud Crawford. Manager, New Lodge Riding Centre, Riding for the Disabled Association. For services to Disabled People.
- Terence Crolley. Chair of Trustee Board, The Whitechapel Centre. For services to Tackling Homelessness in Merseyside.
- Claire Louise Croot. Paralegal Business Manager, Crown Prosecution Service. For services to Law and Order.
- Andrew Cropley. Principal and Chief Executive, West Nottinghamshire College and Chair, Mansfield Place Board. For services to the community of Ashfield and Mansfield.
- Professor Geoffrey Joel Crossick. For services to the Arts and to Education.
- Michael Thomas Crowther. Chief Executive, Empowerment. For services to the community in Blackpool.
- Philip John Crummy. Lately Director and Principal Archaeologist, Colchester Archaeological Trust. For services to Archaeology and Heritage.
- John Culbert. Managing Director, Glenisla Kilts. For services to the Textile and Fashion Industries in Scotland.
- Emily Grace Cunningham. Marine Biologist. For services to Marine Conservation and Coastal Communities.
- Robin Michael Kirkpatrick Daly. Founder and Chair, Yes to Life. For services to People with Cancer.
- Marie-Claire Darke. Councillor, City of Wolverhampton Council. For services to Local Government, to Disability and to Suicide Prevention.
- Katherine Darlington. Founder and Chief Executive, The Scott Partnership. For services to Business Growth and to International Trade.
- Bethan Darwin. Founder, Superwoman Wales. For services to Women in Business and to Charity.
- Professor Bhaskar Dasgupta. Consultant Rheumatologist, Mid and South Essex NHS Foundation Trust. For services to People with Giant Cell Arteritis and Polymyalgia Rheumatica.
- Dr Kerrie Ann Davies. Lately Lead Scientific Advisor, Technologies Validation Group, UK Health Security Agency. For services to Healthcare Science.
- Professor Daniel Michael Davis FMedSci. Chair in Immunology, Imperial College London. For services to Science Communication.
- Phillip John Davis. Founder, Magical Taxi Tour, Worshipful Company of Hackney Carriage Drivers. For Charitable Service to Children with Life Threatening Illnesses.
- Amanda Eve Delew (Amanda Bomsztyk). Northern Regional Director, Community Security Trust. For services to the Jewish Community.
- David Charles Dempster. Lately Head Teacher, Boroughmuir High School, Edinburgh. For services to Education in Scotland.
- Dr Harry Destecroix. Founder, Science Creates. For services to Science.
- Andrea Margaret Dobson. For services to Rugby League Football.
- Neil Doherty. For services to the community in County Londonderry.
- Henry Gabriel Dolan. For services to the Economy and to the community in Strabane, County Tyrone.
- Michael Thomas Donovan. For services to Inclusion in Sport and Education.
- Mark Trevis Downes. International Team Manager, Angling Trust. For services to Angling.
- Gillian Margaret Duncan. Founder and Coordinator, East Neuk First Responders. For voluntary services to the community in East Neuk, Fife.
- Hugh Anthony Duncan. For services to Entertainment and to the community in Northern Ireland.
- Graeme Alexander Dunnett. Head of Reactors, Dounreay, a Division of Nuclear Restoration Services. For services to the Nuclear Industry.
- Alison Luise Durban. Trustee, Gesher School, London. For services to Children and Young People with Special Education Needs.
- Nathaniel James Dye. Cancer Awareness Campaigner and Advocate for an Improved NHS. For Political and Community Service.
- Lisa Eldridge. Lately Global Creative Director, Lancome. For services to the Cosmetic and Fashion Industries.
- William Thomas Ellard. For services to Swimming.
- David Steven Ellis. For services to Paratriathalon.
- Lisa Evans. Manager, Abacus Nursery and Childcare Ltd, Kent. For services to Early Years.
- Roger Kenneth Evans. Chair, Friends of Friendless Churches. For services to Ecclesiastical Heritage in England and Wales.
- Brell Peter Ewart DL. For services to the community in Derbyshire.
- Mark William Fane. Lately Chair, The Garden Museum. For services to Horticulture.
- Janet Farmer. Lately Director, Pocklington Arts Centre. For services to the Arts.
- Duncan Charles Farrington. Farmer and Founder, Farrington Oils. For services to Agriculture and to the Food and Drink Industry.
- Lorraine Finlay. Principal Officer, Head, Area Planning, Department of Education, Northern Ireland Civil Service. For services to Education.
- Richard Andrew Finney. Founder and Moustache Meister, Captain Fawcett. For services to International Trade and to Charity.
- Emma Marion Finucane. For services to Cycling.
- Joanne Marie Fitzpatrick. Core Programming and Curriculum Specialist, PeacePlayers. For services to Peace, Reconciliation and Sport in the community in Northern Ireland.
- Martin James Flett. Patron, CLAN Cancer Support. For services to Fundraising and to the community in Orkney and Shetland.
- Bernadette Flynn. For services to People affected by Dementia in the Western Health and Social Care Trust Area.
- Melanie Louise Ford. County Commissioner, Girlguiding Sussex West and Lead Volunteer, World Association of Girl Guides and Girl Scouts. For services to Young People.
- Sabrina Ann Fortune. For services to Athletics.
- Dr Gavin James Francis. Consultant Physician, NHS Tayside. For services to Geriatric Medicine.
- Jane Anna-Louise Frankland. Director, KnewStart. For services to Women in Cyber Security.
- Christopher Derrick Fulford. Trustee and Volunteer, The Northern Care Trust. For services to People with Disabilities in North Devon.
- Francis Patrick Galvin. For services to Heritage in Greater Manchester.
- Barbara Lesley Gardner. Founder and Chief Executive Officer, Animals Interfaith Alliance, and Trustee and Treasurer, RSPCA. For services to Animal Welfare.
- Nichole Garner. Early Years Manager, North Tyneside Council, North Tyneside. For services to Children and Families.
- James Douglas Garrett. Lately Chair, Northern Ireland Policing Board. For Public Service.
- Dr Alfred Garwood. Holocaust Survivor. For services to Holocaust Memorialisation.
- Shaun Malcolm Gash. Ambassador, Hollister Inc Ltd. For services to Charity and to Disabled People.
- Kenneth Gee. Crew Person, Kirkwall Lifeboat Station, Royal National Lifeboat Institution. For services to Maritime Safety and to the community in Orkney.
- Peter Charles Gibbons BEM. Chief Security Officer, Network Rail. For services to the Railway and to Support for Ukraine.
- Susan Helen Gibson. Vice-Principal, Omagh High School. For services to Education in Northern Ireland.
- Joyce Hannah Giller (Joyce Lambert). For services to the community in Essex.
- Dr Frances Claire Louise Gillies. Civilian Medical Practitioner, Defence Primary Healthcare, RAF Akrotiri. For services to Service Personnel and to the Cypriot Community.
- Natasha Gilmour. Head, Extra Help Unit, Citizens Advice Scotland. For services to Vulnerable Consumers.
- Winston Glass. Principal, Enniskillen Model Primary School. For services to Education in Northern Ireland.
- Roger Philip Glossop. For services to Theatre and the Performing Arts.
- Helena Good. Director, Daydream Believers. For services to the Education Sector.
- Helen Alexandra Goodfellow. Nuclear Stock Consultant. For services to Seed Potato Production in Scotland.
- Nicola Caroline Goulder. Founder, Create. For services to Disadvantaged People and to Charity.
- Finlay Graham. For services to Cycling.
- Dr Imogen Daisy Grant. For services to Rowing.
- Kirstin Ann Grant. For services to Young People with Special Needs in Nairn, Scotland.
- Geoffrey Greaves. Cinema Proprietor. For services to the Cinema Sector.
- Lorna Greig. Girl Guide Leader and Outdoor Activity Adviser. For services to Young People through Guiding in Scotland.
- Gerard Gribbon. For services to the community in Armagh.
- Jodie Michelle Grinham. For services to Archery.
- Lucien Ezra Gubbay. For services to Interfaith Relations.
- James Richard Gurd. Lately Executive Director, Conservative Friends of Israel. For Political and Public Service.
- Fazilet Hadi. Head of Policy, Disability Rights UK. For services to Promoting the Interests of Disabled People.
- Louise Hager. Chair, Chai Cancer Care. For services to People with
- Neil Liam Halford. Co-Founder, Time is Precious. For services to Charitable Fundraising for Children with an Illness in the South West of England.
- Nicola Clare Halford. Co-Founder, Time is Precious. For services to Charitable Fundraising for Children with an Illness in the South West of England.
- Samantha Jane Hamber. Head of Criminal Justice Services, St Mungo’s. For services to Tackling Homelessness.
- Dr Linley Patrick Hamilton. For services to the Music Industry in Northern Ireland.
- Charles Han. Lately International Liaison Manager, Home Office. For services to Border Security.
- Alan David Hansen. Lately Broadcaster. For services to Association Football and to Broadcasting.
- Sandra Margaret Hardacre. For voluntary service to Athletics in Scotland.
- Frank Alexander Harding. Trustee, Association of Jewish Refugees. For services to Holocaust Memorialisation.
- Susannah Hardyman. Founder and lately Chief Executive Officer, Action Tutoring, London. For services to Education.
- Jeremy Arthur Hargreaves. Vice-Chair, Federal Policy Committee of the Liberal Democrats. For Political Service.
- Michael David Harris. Organist and Master of the Music, St Giles’ Cathedral, Edinburgh. For services to Music.
- Zoe Harris. Chief Executive Officer, PACE Academy Trust, London. For services to Education.
- Judith Barbara Hartley. Lately Chief Executive Officer, British Business Investments. For services to Business.
- Clare Louise Mary Harvey. Chief Executive, The Ogden Trust, London. For services to Education.
- Neil David Hatton. Chief Executive Officer, UK Screen Alliance. For services to the Visual Effects and Animation Industries.
- Professor Elaine Margaret Hay. Professor of Community Rheumatology, Keele University. For services to Medical Research.
- Gordon McKenzie Hay. Founder, Doric Board and Choirmaster, Longside Parish Church. For services to the Promotion of the Doric Language.
- Ashley Irwin Hayes. Prison Governor, Hydebank Wood Secure College and Women’s Prison, Northern Ireland Prison Service. For Public Service.
- Lisa Margaret Haythorne. Senior Solicitor Derbyshire Law Centre, and Lately President Sheffield and District Law Society. For services to Vulnerable and Homeless People.
- Robert Douglas David Heard. Road Safety Campaigner. For services to Road Safety.
- Carol Anne Hearn. Switchboard Operator, Prime Minister’s Office. For Public Service.
- Joseph Austin Heeney. Founder, Resolve. For services to Drug and Alcohol Rehabilitation.
- Lauren Henry. For services to Rowing.
- Beverley Higgs JP. Magistrate Avon, Somerset and Gloucester Bench and Magistrates’ Association Volunteer. For services to the Administration of Justice.
- Rauni Ann Lucy Higson. Silversmith. For services to Silversmithing and to Heritage Crafts.
- Anthony Roderic Hill. For services to the Samaritans and to Young People.
- Catherine Jennifer Hitchen. Professional Adviser, SEND, Department for Education. For services to Education and SEND.
- Keely Nicole Hodgkinson. For services to Athletics.
- Gillian Anne Hodgson. Founder, Flowers From the Farm. For services to Floristry.
- Jennifer Anne Holl. For services to Cycling.
- Helen Holland. Lately Local Councillor, Hartcliffe and Withywood. For services to Local Government and to the community of Hartcliffe and Withywood.
- Dr Demelza Elsbeth Mae Holmes. Strategic Director, National Children’s Bureau and Director, Research in Practice. For services to Improving Social Care Practice.
- Marlyn Catherine Hookings. For services to the community in Torquay, Devon.
- Gareth Hopkins. Apprenticeship Programme Manager, Forestry Commission. For services to Forestry.
- The Reverend Dr Kenneth Victor John Hopkins. Chair of Trustees, Heart of Mercia Multi Academy Trust, Hereford. For services to Education.
- Paul Hornby. Founder, Hornby Foundation. For services to Philanthropy and to the communities of Barrow, Furness and South Cumbria.
- Gary Horne. Deputy Chief Executive, Colchester Institute, Essex. For services to Education.
- Julian Nicholas Horsler. Equality and Diversity Manager, National Highways. For services to Equality, Accessibility and Inclusion.
- Peter Cecil How. For voluntary and philanthropic services to Music.
- Madeline Howard. Manager, Sage UK. For services to Cyber Security.
- Tessa Gillian Howard. Founder, Inclusive Sportswear CIC and Hockey Player. For services to Inclusive Sportswear for Women and Girls.
- Barbara Howell. Foster Carer, Norfolk County Council. For services to Foster Care.
- Charles James Hubbert. Foster Carer, Barnardo’s, Liverpool, Merseyside. For services to Foster Care.
- Dianne Hubbert. Foster Carer, Barnardo’s, Liverpool, Merseyside. For services to Foster Care.
- Jacqueline Hyde. Vice-President, Artist and Company Relations, Sony Music. For services to the Music Industry.
- Graham Ibbeson. Artist. For services to the Arts.
- Titilola Idris-Debayo. Founder, Lolo Foundation. For services to Tackling Homelessness.
- Major Grenville Archer Irvine Fortescue DL. Volunteer and Gordon Highlander Welfare Officer. For services to the Gordon Highlanders.
- Jacynth Althea Ivey. Board Member, NHS Race and Health Observatory. For services to Nursing.
- Jane Elizabeth Jackson. Founder, Bristol Grandparents Support Group. For services to Older People in Bristol.
- Elaine Louise James. Head of Service, Learning Disabilities and Preparation for Adulthood, Bradford Metropolitan District Council. For services to Social Care.
- Martine Jays. Officer, National Crime Agency. For services to Law Enforcement.
- Susan Jee. Non Executive Director, Nuclear Restoration Services. For services to the Nuclear Industry.
- Katarina Johnson-Thompson. For services to Athletics.
- Philippa Claire Jones. Director, Create Gloucestershire. For services to the Arts.
- Philippa Jacqueline Jones. Board Member, United Kingdom Acute Oncology Society. For services to Oncology.
- Richard Huw Jones. For services to St. John Ambulance in Wales.
- Vivien Mary Jones. Founder and Trustee, Nystagmus Network. For services to the Nystagmus Community.
- Lorraine Jones-Burrell. Founder and Chief Executive Officer, Dwayne Simpson Foundation CIC Ltd. For services to Young People and to Tackling Knife Crime.
- Elizabeth Victoria Jordan. For services to Cycling.
- Fiona Mary Patricia Kane. Director, Vice-Chancellor’s Office, Ulster University. For Public Service in Northern Ireland.
- Mike Katz. National Chair, Jewish Labour Movement. For Political and Public Service.
- Professor Francis Paul Keenan. Professor, School of Mathematics and Physics, Queen’s University Belfast. For services to Higher Education.
- George Edwin Ridley Kelly. President, St Ives Branch, The Royal British Legion. For voluntary services to the Royal British Legion and to Royal Air Force Veterans.
- Kathryn Leigh Kelly. Chief Executive Officer, Lionheart Educational Trust, Leicestershire. For services to Education.
- Peter John Kennedy. Lately Executive Principal, Franklin College, Grimsby. For services to Further Education.
- Dr Elizabeth Clare Kent. Associate Head, Marine Physics and Ocean Climate, National Oceanography Centre. For services to Tracking Global Temperatures.
- Professor Sara Leslie Kenyon. Professor of Evidence Based Maternity Care, University of Birmingham. For services to Midwifery.
- Elizabeth Jane Kerr. Lately Director, UK Space. For services to the Space Industry.
- Dannielle Jade Elizabeth Khan. For services to Cycling.
- Michael Francis Kilbride. Principal, Birkenhead Sixth Form College, Merseyside. For services to Education.
- Alastair John Kingsley. Chair of Trustees, Hampton Academies Trust, Cambridgeshire. For services to Education.
- Calvin Kipling. Head, Virtual School, Darlington Borough Council. For services to Education.
- Margaret Kirby. Solicitor and Founder, Legacare. For services to the Law and to Vulnerable People.
- Myleene Angela Klass. Ambassador, Tommy’s. For services to Women’s Health, Miscarriage Awareness and to Charity.
- Graham Knowles. Chair and Trustee, British Glass Foundation. For services to Heritage.
- Kan Koo. Chief Executive, Cosmo Restaurant Group. For services to the Hospitality Industry.
- Marsha Tiana Kuye. Lately Head, Border Delivery, Cabinet Office. For services to Border Readiness.
- Dr Lam Lei Bonnie Kwok. Headteacher, London Hackney Chinese Community School, London Borough of Hackney. For services to Education.
- Stephen Paul Lamacq. For services to Broadcasting and to Music Venues.
- Major (Rtd) Kevin Gibson Lamb. Founder, Wind Band Association. For services to Music.
- Rabiyah Kauser Latif. Near Neighbours Coordinator, Thrive Together Birmingham. For services to Faith and Community Cohesion.
- Lynne Colleen Lawrence. Lately Executive Director, Maria Montessori Institute (AMI), London. For services to Education.
- Jane Lawson. Development Director, Victoria and Albert Museum. For services to Museums.
- Mark John Lay. National Drug Coordination Lead, National Police Chiefs Council. For services to Preventing Drug Related Deaths.
- Dr Richard Arnold Charles Lea. Consultant in Acute Medicine and Clinical Director, Cardiff and Vale University Health Board. For services to Acute Medicine.
- James Charles Lee. EASE Project Coordinator, Glasgow Clyde College. For services to English for Speakers of Other Languages Education in Glasgow.
- Florian Leonhardt. For services to Fine Historical and Modern String Instruments.
- Susannah Louise Levy. Trustee, Women’s Sport Trust. For services to Diversity and Inclusion in Sport.
- Melanie Lewis. Lately Chief Executive, Shakespeare North Playhouse. For services to Theatre.
- Eileen Rosemary Lindley. Foster Carer, Doncaster Children’s Services Trust. For services to Foster Care.
- Professor Nicholas John Linker. Lately National Clinical Director for Heart Disease, NHS England. For services to People with Heart Disease.
- Leslie Lipert. For services to the Jewish Community in Cornwall.
- William David Lipp. Chair, Lifeboat Management Group, Invergordon Lifeboat Station, Royal National Lifeboat Institution. For services to the Royal National Lifeboat Institution.
- Professor David Meredydd Lloyd. Professor of Surgery and Consultant Laparoscopic and Liver Surgeon, University Hospitals of Leicester NHS Trust. For services to Surgery.
- Erica Ann Lockhart. Chair, South East Social Care Alliance. For services to Adult Social Care.
- Daniel Kevin Longman JP. Magistrate and Deputy Chair, Liverpool Bench, Diversity and Community Relations Magistrate, Trustee of the Magistrates’ Association and Deputy of Merseyside and Cheshire Advisory Committee. For services to the Administration of Justice.
- Tracy Marie Lowe. Founder, Wallace Youth Project. For services to Young People.
- George John Lucas. For services to Tennis and to Sports Management and Administration in Northern Ireland.
- Dr William Bain Lumsden. Director of Distilling, Whisky Creation and Whisky Stocks, The Glenmorangie Company. For services to the Scotch Whisky Industry.
- Christine Anne Lyness. Governor, Ashton Sixth Form College, Ashton-under-Lyne, Greater Manchester. For services to Education.
- George Grant Macdonald. Founder and Director, Grant Macdonald Silversmiths. For services to the Economy and Silversmithing Industry.
- Wendy June Mackie. Managing Director and Deputy Designated Safeguarding Lead, Works4U, Tameside and Greater Manchester. For services to Education.
- Nathan Andrew MacQueen. For services to Archery.
- Simon James Macqueen. Director of Strategy, Sport England. For services to Sport.
- James Stewart Malcolm. State Trumpeter, Court of the Lord Lyon. For services to State Ceremonial Events in Scotland and to Charitable Fundraising.
- Triska Mamand. For services to Law Enforcement.
- Marilyn Mansfield-Clark DL. For services to the community in Crawley, West Sussex.
- Katy Marchant. For services to Cycling.
- Julian George Margolin. Chief Ambassador, KidsOut. For charitable services to Children Escaping Domestic Abuse and Violence.
- David Martin. Chair of Friends of Brownlow House. For voluntary services to the community in Lurgan, Northern Ireland.
- Poppy Willow Maskill. For services to Swimming.
- David Matthews. Founder, The Listening Walk. For services to the Samaritans and to Vulnerable People.
- Christopher Andrew Maxwell. Regional Homelessness Prevention Team Coordinator, Yorkshire and the Humber Probation Service. For services to Public Protection, Reducing Reoffending and Rehabilitation.
- Shirley Joyce Maxwell. For services to the Epilepsy Community in Scotland.
- Christian McBride. Founder and Chief Executive Officer, Genuine Solutions Group. For services to Business and to Philanthropy.
- Thomas Seamus McCabe. For voluntary service to the community in Newry, Mourne and Down, Northern Ireland.
- Adam McCamley. Senior Analyst, Liverpool City Council. For services to Social Care Data.
- Janet Mary McConkey. Chair, Coventry Boot Fund. For services to Vulnerable Children and Families in Coventry.
- Susie McDonald. Chief Executive Officer, Tender Education and Arts, and Founder, Tender National. For services to Young People and to the Prevention of Abuse.
- Jonathan William McDowell. Founder, Indie Fude. For services to the Food and Drink Industry in Northern Ireland.
- Caroline McGough. Lately Foster Carer, Middlesbrough Council. For services to Foster Care.
- Gordon McGough. Lately Foster Carer, Middlesbrough Council. For services to Foster Care.
- Stephen William McGuire. For services to Boccia and to Young People.
- Lawrence David McKee. Chair, Wealden Sailability and Trustee, Rockdale Sheltered Housing. For charitable services to Disabled People and to the community in Kent.
- Robert James McKelvey. For services to Castlederg Credit Union and to the community in County Tyrone.
- Niall McKenna. Chef and Owner, James St and Waterman House. For services to Hospitality and to Tourism, and to Local Food and Drink Producers in Northern Ireland.
- Louise Diane Mckiernan. Chief Executive, Disability Resource Centre. For services to Disabled People.
- Patrick McLaughlin. Coxswain, Red Bay Lifeboat Station and Trustee, Royal National Lifeboat Institution. For voluntary services to Maritime Safety.
- Ronald McMurdie. Lately Special Chief Inspector, Hertfordshire Constabulary. For services to Policing.
- Anthony John Adam McNally. Detective Chief Superintendent, Police Service of Northern Ireland. For Public Service.
- Susan Medway. Director and Curator, Chelsea Physic Garden. For services to Horticulture and to Charity.
- Amanda Mifsud. Co-Founder, Abbie’s Army. For charitable services to Children and Families dealing with Diffuse Intrinsic Pontine Glioma and to Brain Tumour Research.
- Raymond Mifsud. Co-Founder, Abbie’s Army. For charitable services to Children and Families dealing with Diffuse Intrinsic Pontine Glioma and to Brain Tumour Research.
- Mark Gerald Mitchell. Lately Chair of Trustees, Solent Academies Trust. For services to Education.
- Lynne Moore. Lately Service Leader, Department for Work and Pensions. For Public Service in North and Mid Wales.
- Melanie Moore. Office Manager, House of Lords. For services to Parliament.
- Zandra Lee Moore. Co-Founder and Chief Executive Officer, Panintelligence. For services to Gender Equality in Business.
- Peter Morton. Director and Founder, Wight Shipyard Company Ltd. For services to Shipbuilding.
- Thomas Stewart Muir. Engagement and Exhibitions Officer, Orkney Museum, Kirkwall. For services to Orkney Folk Tales.
- Gail Munro. Ice Rink Manager, Stranraer Ice Rink. For services to Curling.
- Professor Alison Pamela Murdoch. Lately President, British Fertility Society. For services to Fertility Treatment.
- Anna Murphy. Team Leader, Ministry of Defence. For services to Defence.
- Dr Brian Patrick Murphy. Lately Consultant Cardiologist, NHS Greater Glasgow and Clyde. For services to Heart Failure Therapies and to People with Motor Neurone Disease.
- Christopher David Murphy. Managing Director, Dunster House Ltd and Director, Military Medals and Books Ltd. For services to Business and to Charity.
- James Murray. Co-Founder, Murray Parish Trust and Patron, Friends of PICU, Southampton Children’s Hospital. For services to Children with an Illness and their Families.
- Edwin Charinge Ndlovu. Chief Operating Officer and Deputy Chief Executive, East London NHS Foundation Trust. For services to the NHS and to Nursing.
- Stephen Hugh Neilson. Chair, British Handball. For services to Handball.
- Raymond William Newell. Managing Director, Oakwell Management Services. For services to Industry in the Midlands.
- Paul Newman. Chief Executive, Greensleeves Care. For services to Health and Social Care.
- Norman Andrew Niven. Chair, Aberdour Royal National Lifeboat Institution Committee. For services to the community in Aberdour, Fife.
- John Lee Nixon. Lately Trust Chair, English Football League. For services to Association Football.
- Karen Norton. Lately Executive Primary Head, Vision Academy Learning Trust. For services to Education.
- Michael Andrew Oakes. Chair, National Dairy Board, National Farmers’ Union. For services to Dairy Farming.
- Isobel Pauline Obeng-Dokyi. Founder and Chief Executive Officer, Foundervine. For services to UK Digital Growth and Entrepreneurs from Underrepresented Backgrounds.
- June Frances O’Brien. For services to the community in Epping Forest, Essex.
- David Hugh Fellows Odgers. Consultant and Researcher, Historic Building Conservation. For services to Heritage.
- Arthur Hugh Anthony O’Hagan. For services to the community in Armagh.
- Richard O’Neill. Founder, Richard O’Neill Storytelling, Author, and Creative Lead, Seven Stories, The National Centre for Children’s Books, UK. For services to Education and to Literature.
- Gail O’Shea. Co-Founder, Wipe Away Those Tears. For charitable services to Terminally and Seriously Ill Children in Essex.
- Jason O’Shea. Co-Founder, Wipe Away Those Tears. For charitable services to Terminally and Seriously Ill Children in Essex.
- Zoe Amanda Packman. Deputy Director, Nursing Service Delivery, Transformation and Resilience, NHS England. For services to Nursing.
- Dr Roger Colin Padgham. Scouting Volunteer. For services to Young People.
- Bryony Kate Frances Page. For services to Trampoline Gymnastics.
- The Reverend Andrew Paget. Senior Force Chaplain, Avon and Somerset Police. For services to Policing and to the community in Avon and Somerset.
- Sarah Janet Mary Parish. Co-Founder, Murray Parish Trust and Patron, Friends of PICU, Southampton Children’s Hospital. For services to Children with an Illness and their Families.
- Nicholas Martin Christopher Parkes. Head of Freight, Department of Health and Social Care. For services to the Operations of the Health and Care System.
- Bryher Charlotte Jane Pennells. SEND Teacher, Charlton Park Academy, London. For services to Children and Young People with SEND.
- Professor Gavin David Perkins. Dean of Medicine, Warwick Medical School, University of Warwick. For services to Resuscitation Science.
- Reginald David Perry. HR Director, Employee Engagement, Reward and Compliance, House of Commons. For services to Parliament.
- Hywel Rhys Edward Peterson. For Voluntary and Charitable Services.
- Romano Petrucci. Café Owner and Volunteer. For services to the community in Stranraer.
- Alan John Phillips. Lately Team Manager, Welsh Rugby Union. For services to Rugby Union Football and to Rachel Luise Yates. Director of Clinical Improvement, GIRFT Programme. For services to Clinical Quality Improvement and Patient Safety.
- Alan John Phillips. Lately Team Manager, Welsh Rugby Union. For services to Rugby Union Football and to Charity in Wales.
- Luke Ian Pollard. For services to Paratriathlon.
- Brian Pope. Lately Assistant Director, Children’s Services, Hampshire County Council. For services to Education.
- Donald Richard Potter. Chair, Crewe and Nantwich Conservative Association. For Political and Public Service.
- Philip Poulton. Lately Headteacher, Bensham Manor School, London Borough of Croydon. For services to Children and Young People with SEND.
- Derek Ernest Prentice. Honorary Vice-President, Great British Luge Association. For services to Luge.
- Richard Price. Managing Director, Marks and Spencer. For services to Fashion.
- William James Primrose. For services to Small Businesses in Northern Ireland.
- Andrew James Proctor. Lately Council Leader, Norfolk County Council. For services to Local Government.
- Professor Siobhan Mary Quenby. Professor of Obstetrics, University of Warwick. For services to Obstetrics Research.
- Elliott Rae. Founder, Music Football Fatherhood. For services to Supporting New Parents and to Mental Health.
- Ahsan Zameer Rafeeq. Deputy Head, International Marketing, Department for Business and Trade. For services to Investment and Marketing.
- Ishaque Benny Aslam Rafiqi. Founder, Let’s Feed Brum and Tabor House. For services to Tackling Homelessness and to the community in Birmingham and the West Midlands.
- Shernett Andrea Ranson. Head, Public Appointments Talent and Outreach, Cabinet Office. For Public Service.
- Gareth William Ratcliffe. Deputy Chair, Brecon Beacons National Park Authority and Councillor, Hay on Wye, Powys County Council. For Charitable Services to Bannau Brycheiniog (Brecon Beacons).
- Salma Bibi Ravat. Chief Executive Officer, One Roof Leicester. For services to Tackling Homelessness.
- Lee Rawlinson. Lately Director, Environment Agency. For services to the Environment.
- Dr Stephen Eric Reaney. General Practitioner. For voluntary service to the Northern Ireland Ambulance Service.
- The Reverend Stephen Charles Redman. Volunteer, Candlelighters. For services to the Families of Children with Cancer.
- Caroline Anne Redman Lusher. Founder, Rock Choir. For services to Music and to Charity.
- Dr Clare Marian Rees. Quality and Partnership Lead, Ealing Learning Partnership, London Borough of Ealing. For services to Education.
- David Edwin Rickman. Executive Director, Governance and Chief of Staff, Royal and Ancient Golf Club. For services to Golf.
- Frederick Ring. Co-founder, Chair and Trustee, York Racial Equality Network. For services to the community in York.
- Antonio John Rizzo. Founder, The Alternative Hair Charitable Foundation. For charitable services to Leukaemia Research and to Children with Leukaemia.
- James Michael Roberts. Founder and Chief Executive Officer, mOm Incubators. For services to Engineering and to Entrepreneurship.
- Dr Marcus Eldon Roberts. Director, Policy and Strategy, Association of Police and Crime Commissioners. For services to Public Safety and to the Victims of Addiction.
- Sirkka-Liisa Roberts (Sirkka-Liisa Konttinen). Photographer. For services to Photography.
- Ruth Margaret Robertson. Head of Programme, Health Protection, NHS Education for Scotland. For services to Public Health and Health Protection in Scotland.
- Dr Chris Robinson. General Practitioner and Volunteer. For services to the community in Lochaber, Inverness-shire.
- Megan Kay Robinson. Headteacher, Elvetham Heath Primary School, Fleet, Hampshire. For services to Education.
- Janet Elizabeth Rogers. Volunteer. For services to Cats and Wildcats in the North East of Scotland.
- Karen Anne Rogers. Chief Executive, Herefordshire Care Homes Group. For services to Social Care.
- Janice Rose. Lately Head of Economy and Regeneration, Northumberland County Council. For services to Heritage and to Local Government.
- Philip Rose. Founder and lately Senior Partner, SciTech, North West England. For services to Children’s Science Education.
- Harvey Rosenblatt. President, Nightingale Hammerson. For services to Jewish Community Social Care.
- Simon Ross. Examiner, IAM and RoSPA BikeSafe and Biker Down Road Safety Workshops. For services to Road Safety for Motorcyclists in Gloucestershire.
- Beatrice Rowlatt (Bee Rowlatt). For services to the Promotion of Women’s Rights and Women’s Cultural Contributions.
- Susan Barbara Rumbold. Chief Officer, Partnership Development and Business Support, Leeds City Council and Foster Carer. For services to Children and Families.
- Lindsay Anne Russell. Information Support Officer, Infantry Training Centre. For services to Service Recruits, their Families and to Defence.
- Professor Gerard Samuel Saddler. Head of Science and Advice for Scottish Agriculture and Chief Plant Health Officer for Scotland. For services to Scottish Plant Health and to Biosecurity.
- Soma Sara. Founder, Everyone’s Invited. For services to the Eradication of Sexual Abuse Against Women.
- Edwina Sassoon. Arts Consultant. For services to the Visual Arts, Museums and Gardens.
- Gareth Sayers. For services to Business and to the Economy in County Tyrone.
- Julian Anthony Sayers DL. Director, Adkin. For services to Agriculture.
- Daniel Schunmann JP DL. Founder, VIVA Theatre. For services to Community Theatre in Cambridgeshire.
- Hannah Elizabeth Scott. For services to Rowing.
- Lesley Anne Scott. Founder, Dog Meat Trade Dachshund Rescue and Support Group. For Charitable Services.
- Leslie Scott. Lately Councillor, Sunderland City Council. For Political and Public Service.
- James Richard Scroggs. Chair, Campaign Against Living Miserably. For services to Male Mental Health and to the Prevention of Suicide.
- Imran Hussain Shah. Chair, Police Independent Advisory Group and Community Leader, West Yorkshire Police. For services to Policing and to the community in West Yorkshire.
- Aman Sharma. Chief Executive Officer, Totus Digital. For services to Building and Fire Safety.
- Janet Sharpe. Lately Director of Housing, Sheffield City Council. For services to Local Government.
- Barbara Ann Sharples. For services to Charity in Cornwall and the Isles of Scilly.
- Dr Penelope Jane Shirlaw. Chair, London Local Dental Network and Honorary Consultant, Office of the Chief Dental Officer, NHS England. For services to Dentistry.
- Dr Timothy Francis John Shortis. Co-Director, Poetry by Heart. For services to Education.
- Keely Siddiqui Charlick. Chief Executive Officer, Sunnyside Rural Trust, Hertfordshire. For services to Adult Social Care.
- Benjamin Patrick Huw Simpson. Lately Chief Executive Officer and Founder, Sea-Kit International. For services to the Maritime Industry.
- Douglas Whiteley Smith. For services to the community in Sunderland.
- Joanne Smith. Founder and Chief Executive, Fighting All Cancers Together. For services to People Affected by Cancer in the North East of England.
- The Reverend Dr John Simon Smith. Founder and Patron, Cransley Hospice. For services to Palliative Care both in Hospice and in the community in North Northamptonshire.
- Laura Katie Smyth. Founder and Chief Executive Officer, Yorda Adventures. For services to Disabled Children and their Families.
- Bolaji Olubusola Sofoluwe. Co-Founder, Group MD Enterprise, Training and Knowledge Group. For services to Sustainable Business Growth, to Female Entrepreneurs and to International Trade.
- Marian Spiers. Director, Dost Centre for Young Refugees and Migrants. For services to Young People.
- Toni Spoors. Deputy Chief Executive Officer, North East Learning Trust. For services to Education.
- Robert Starr. Founder, The Starr Trust. For services to Young People and to Philanthropy.
- Helen Nicola Steers. Partner, Pantheon’s European Investment Team. For Voluntary Service and services to Gender Equality in Business.
- Gregg Stevenson. For services to Rowing.
- Ian McLeod Stevenson. Founder and Chief Executive Officer, Cyacomb. For services to Online Safety Technology.
- Sally Anne Strachey. Founder and Technical Lead, Sally Strachey Historic Conservation Ltd. For services to the Repair and Conservation of Heritage Buildings.
- Carol Patricia Straker. For services to Dance.
- Kimberley Jane Streets DL. Chief Executive Officer, Sheffield Museums. For services to Culture.
- Sarah Lucy Sultman. Trustee, Gesher School, London. For services to Children and Young People with Special Education Needs.
- Keith Surtees. Senior Investigating Officer, Operation Kenova, Police Service for Northern Ireland. For Public Service.
- Pamela Ann Swain. Chief Executive, British Association of Dental Nurses. For services to Dental Nursing.
- Debbie Ann Swales. Founder, Revival North Yorkshire CIC. For services to the Prevention of Loneliness and Isolation in Older People in North Yorkshire.
- Kerrie Jean Sweeney. Chief Executive, Maritime Belfast Trust. For services to Maritime Heritage and to Tourism in Northern Ireland.
- Dr Carol Elizabeth Sweetenham. Founder Board Member and Lately Chair, Aspire. For services to Providing Employment Opportunities for Vulnerable and Disadvantaged People in Oxfordshire.
- Claire Taggart. For services to Boccia.
- Wendy Ann Tarplee-Morris. Founder, Little Princess Trust. For services to Children and Young People with Cancer.
- Michael Austin Taylor. Chair of Trustees, Centre for Alternative Technology. For services to Charity and to Innovation.
- Professor Ketevan Tchanturia. Professor of Psychology in Eating Disorders, Institute of Psychiatry, Psychology and Neuroscience, King’s College London and Consultant Psychologist, South London and Maudsley NHS Foundation Trust. For services to People with Eating Disorders and Autism.
- Professor Melissa Terras FREng. Professor of Digital Cultural Heritage, Edinburgh College of Art, University of Edinburgh. For services to Digital Humanities.
- Christabel Diana Beatrice, The Lady Flight. For services to Local Government and to Charitable Causes.
- Pamela Susan Thiedeman. Lately Head of Culture and Visitor Economy, Barnsley Council. For services to Culture and to Heritage in South Yorkshire.
- Ian Michael Thomas. Director, NewcastleGateshead Initiative. For services to Tourism.
- David Lorimer Thompson. For services to Education and to the community in County Tyrone.
- Ruth Margaret Thomsen. Scientific Director, NHS England, London Region. For services to Healthcare Science.
- Kathryn Margaret Thomson. Lately Chief Executive, Liverpool Women’s NHS Foundation Trust. For services to the NHS.
- Nadine Tilbury. Lately Policy Officer, Working Together with Parents Network. For services to Promoting the Rights of Disabled Parents.
- Joan Todd. Team Manager, Afghan Resettlement and Ukraine Response Team, Manchester City Council. For services to Refugee Resettlement.
- William James Toner. Chief Executive Officer, Hospitality Group of Companies. For services to the Hospitality Sector.
- Dr Malcolm David William Tozer. Author and Adviser, Physical Education. For services to Physical Education and Sports.
- Janet Elizabeth Trowse. Head of Human Resources, Network Rail. For services to the Railway and to Menopause Awareness in the Workplace.
- Amy Truesdale. For services to Taekwondo.
- Charles James Turner DL. Chair, Made in Sheffield and Managing Director, Edward Turner and Son Ltd. For services to Manufacturing and Business in Sheffield.
- Kevin Edward Turner. Co-Founder, Company Chameleon. For services to Dance and to Mental Health.
- Anna Ruth Twomlow. Witness Care Coordinator, Serious Fraud Office. For services to the Administration of Justice.
- Jessica Lorena Uguccioni. Deputy Head, Centre for Connected and Autonomous Vehicles, Department for Transport. For services to the Regulation of Self-Driving Vehicles.
- Sophie Beth Unwin. For services to Cycling.
- Kenneth Upton. Advocate, Talking Sense, West Midlands. For services to Families of Children with Special Education Needs.
- Professor Ajay Jaikishore Vora. Lately Consultant Paediatric Haematologist, Great Ormond Street Hospital for Children NHS Foundation Trust. For services to Childhood Leukaemia.
- Chandni Kalpesh Vora. Chief Operating Officer, Vascroft Contractors Ltd. For services to Business and to Charity.
- Vivian Wallace. Ageing Well Coordinator, Midlothian Council. For services to Older People in Midlothian.
- Catharine Louise Walton. Chief Engineer and Technical Lead, Home Office. For Public Service.
- David Ward. Founder and Trustee, Abigail’s Footsteps. For services to Bereaved Parents of Stillborn Children, particularly in Kent.
- Helen Ruth Wardale. Chair, Apollo Academies Trust, Norfolk. For services to Education.
- Laura Anne Lillian Ward-Ongley. Founder and Global Chief Executive Officer, EXEAT. For services to International Trade, to Sustainability and to Women in Business.
- Katy Robena Ware. For services to Maritime Safety and Technology.
- Sheila Joyce Warner. Vice Chair, Wells Lifeboat Guild, Norfolk. For voluntary services to the Royal National Lifeboat Institution.
- Alexandria Warren. Co-Founder, Dom’s Food Mission. For services to the Eradication of Food Waste and Poverty.
- Dominic Warren. Co-Founder, Dom’s Food Mission. For services to the Eradication of Food Waste and Poverty.
- John Dudley Watkinson. Chair, Vistage International. For services to Business.
- Penelope Emeline Heather Jacqueline Watson. Dementia Campaigner. For services to Dementia Care in Football.
- Carol Anne Watterson. Lately Lead Educational Psychologist, Darlington Borough Council. For services to Children and Young People with Special Educational Needs.
- Kenneth Frank Weatherley. Co-Founder and Director, Tennis First. For services to Young People.
- Jacqueline Weir (Jackie Bird). Journalist and Presenter. For services to Broadcasting and to Charities in Scotland.
- Michelle Louise Wells (Michelle Elkins). Communications Advisor, Love of The Game. For services to Charity, particularly the Prevention of Head Injuries in Sport.
- Mavis West. Trustee and Founder, Yorkshire Association for Music and Special Educational Needs. For services to Adults and Children with Additional Needs through the Provision of Music.
- Ronald Harry Westerman. Founder, Midlincs County Youth Football League. For services to Sport.
- John Westwell. Director, System Leadership, National Centre for Excellence in the Teaching of Mathematics. For services to Education.
- Carolyn Wheatley. Founder and Chair, Patients on Intravenous and Naso-gastric Nutrition Treatment (PINNT). For services to Patients with Intestinal Failure.
- James White. Officer, National Crime Agency. For services to Law Enforcement.
- Patricia Ann White. Chief Executive Officer, Suited for Success. For services to Unemployed People in Birmingham.
- Robert John White. Senior Infrastructure Manager, North Sea Transition Authority. For services to Energy Security.
- Stephen John Whiting. Senior Policy Advisor and Lead Communications Officer, UK Debt Management Office. For Public Service.
- Andrew Rodney Wickham. Managing Director, Go South Coast. For services to the Bus Industry.
- Professor Clare Elizabeth Wilkinson. Emeritus Professor of General Practice, North Wales Centre for Primary Care Research, Bangor University. For services to Primary Care Research, Teaching and Practice.
- Karen Mary Williams. Co-Founder and Chief Executive Officer, Escape Arts. For services to the community in Warwickshire.
- Beatrice Dorothy Wilson. Food Writer and Journalist. For services to Food Writing and Food Education.
- Jane Alison Wilson. Head, Strategy and People Engagement for Enterprise Security and Risk Management, Department for Work and Pensions. For Public Service.
- Nicola Wilson. Coach and Mentor, Wesko Equestrian Foundation. For services to Sport.
- Richard Andrew Wilson. Landscape Architect Garden Designer. For services to the Landscape and Garden Design Industry and to Heritage.
- Lee Wong. Lately National Blood Health Team Lead, Welsh Blood Service. For services to the Welsh Blood Service.
- Katherine Wood. Founding Director, Firstsite. For services to Art and to the community in Essex.
- Roderick Michael Haydn Wood. Founder and Managing Director, CWP Energy Ltd. For services to Renewable Energy and to Sustainability.
- Professor Martin John Wooster. Professor of Earth Observation Science, King’s College London. For services to Landscape Fire Research and Wildfire Monitoring.
- Peter Robert Worth. For services to Short Track Speed Skating.
- Karon Eileen Elizabeth Wright. Founder and Artistic Director, Samling Institute. For services to Music.
- William Wyatt. Chair, Halliwick Association of Swimming Therapy. For services to Disabled People.
- Anthony William Wynne. Lately President, Welsh Amateur Boxing Association. For services to Amateur Boxing.
- Rachel Luise Yates. Director of Clinical Improvement, GIRFT Programme. For services to Clinical Quality Improvement and Patient Safety.
- Peter Dillworth Young. For services to Music and Drama Education in London.

=== British Empire Medal (BEM) ===
Ribbon of the British Empire Medal

- Robert Adams, lately Chair, Spurn Bird Observatory Trust. For services to Local Wildlife Protection.
- David Irvine Addis. For services to the community in Long Ashton, Somerset.
- Mirza Khudadad Ahmed, Immigration Officer, Home Office. For Public Service.
- Michael Timothy Alden, Football Coach and Manager, Park Knowle Football Club. For services to Grassroot Football and to the community in Bristol.
- Nazim Ali, Founder, Creating Smiles Hospital Gifts Initiative. For services to Charity, and to Homeless and Vulnerable People in Bradford, West Yorkshire.
- Douglas Sidney Allen, Police Support Volunteer, Avon and Somerset Police. For services to Policing and to the community in Somerset.
- Joyce McNaughton Anderson, Leader, School of Dance. For services to Schools and to the community in Fife.
- Christopher Armstrong, Pipe Major. For services to Music.
- Richard Howard Astle, For services to Charity and to the Environment.
- Dr. Christopher Jeremy Ayling. For services to the community in Ennerdale, Cumbria.
- Dr. Nana Siaw-Badu, Chief Executive Officer, Badu Sport. For services to Sport and Physical Activity.
- Abdulai-Olaniyi Balogun, Cleaning Operative, House of Commons. For services to Parliament.
- Maira Shernaz Bana, Co-founder, SheCanEngineer. For services to Diversity in Engineering.
- Arthur Alexander Stewart Barbour, Volunteer Fundraiser, Cancer Focus NI. For Charitable Services.
- Stephen Lloyd Barnabis. For services to Young People and to the community in the London Borough of Waltham Forest.
- Louise Maria Lees-Barrett, Founder, REACH Equine Therapy. For services to Disabled People in Essex.
- Michael David Bateman, Volunteer Coordinator and Team Leader, Beaminster Country Car Scheme. For services to the community in West Dorset.
- Vivienne Bateman, Volunteer Coordinator and Team Leader, Beaminster Country Car Scheme. For services to the community in West Dorset.
- Mikayla Daisy Beames, Founder, Team Mikayla. For services to Charitable Fundraising for Children with Cancer.
- Colin Stuart Bell. For Charitable Service.
- Francesca Hilary Bell, Community Development Officer, Bannau Bycheiniog (Brecon Beacons), National Park Authority. For services to Community Development in Bannau Bycheiniog (Brecon Beacons), National Park.
- Rona Benson, CCTV Operator, Norfolk Constabulary. For services to Policing and to Crime Prevention.
- Lorraine Best, Personal Assistant, H.M. Treasury. For Public Service.
- Sanjib Bhattacharjee. For services to the community in the London Boroughs of Newham, Redbridge and Waltham Forest.
- David John Biddulph, lately Rowing Umpire. For services to Rowing.
- Jagrupe Binning. For services to the community in Tuxford, Nottinghamshire.
- Evelyn Ruth Blumenthal, Volunteer, Royal Free Charity. For services to Hospital Volunteering and to Caring for People with Dementia.
- Christine May Boatwright, Founder and Clinical Director, Kernos Centre. For services to Mental Health in Suffolk.
- David Anthony Bone, Volunteer, The Stroke Association. For services to Stroke Survivors and their Carers across North Wales.
- Susan Boon. For services to the community in Biddenden, Kent and to Charity.
- Lucy Victoria Brenkley, Active Forest Coordinator, Forestry England. For services to Forestry.
- David John Brew. For services to Older People and to Disabled People in Northern Ireland.
- Muriel Joyce Bridges. For services to the St. Elizabeth Hospice, Framlingham, Suffolk.
- Barbara Brook, Volunteer, Girls Friendly Society. For services to Girls, Young Women and to the community in Layton, Blackpool.
- Jeremy Norman Brown, Coordinator, Culture on Scilly. For services to the Arts and Culture on the Isles of Scilly.
- Judith Rose Brown, Campaigner. For services to Parents and Carers of People with Profound Disabilities.
- James Frank Bryan, Founder, London Leaders Development Scheme. For voluntary service to Young People.
- Alison Bunce, Founder, Compassionate Inverclyde. For services to the community in Inverclyde.
- Harry Burgess, Security Officer, Conservative Party. For Political Service.
- Carl Anthony Joseph Burke. For services to Young People in South London.
- Marlene Hilda Burt, Governor, Christ the King Sixth Form College, Bexley, London. For services to Further Education.
- Liesel Carter, Core Supporter, Holocaust Survivors' Friendship Association. For services to Holocaust Education and Remembrance.
- Malcolm Carter. For services to the community in Haslemere, Surrey.
- Mary Catherine Cattanach, Volunteer. For services to the community in Ardchattan, Argyll.
- Malcolm David Chalmers. For services to the community in Wootton, Bedfordshire.
- David Richard Chambers. For services to Music and to the community in Somersham, Cambridgeshire.
- Nathan William Chambers, Emergency Response Volunteer, Eniskillen, British Red Cross. For voluntary services to the Red Cross.
- Julie Ann Charalamous, lately Proprietor, Westcott House Nursing and Residential Care Home. For services to Older People and to People with Disabilities in Dorking, Surrey.
- David Young Forrester Christie. For services to Cricket and to the community in Freuchie, Fife.
- Margaret Clark, Emergency Laparotomy Nurse Specialist, NHS Greater Glasgow and Clyde. For services to the NHS in Scotland.
- Andrew David Clarke, Team Manager, Department for Work and Pensions. For services to Cancer Charities.
- Angela Elaine Clarke, Chair and Founder, Somewhere House Somerset. For services to Mental Health and to Sufferers of Substance Misuse and Trauma.
- Rebecca Lucy Clarke, Volunteer, National Citizen Service and Board Member, Whizz Kidz, Ambitious About Autism Council and Disabled Children's Partnership Youth Advisory Group. For services to Young People with Disabilities and Autism.
- Robin Brian Clements. For services to the community in South East Surrey.
- Jean Clennell, lately Deputy Headteacher, Roundhay School, Leeds, West Yorkshire. For services to Education.
- Michael John Clews, Founder and Leader, The Joystick Club. For services to Young People through the Promotion of Aviation.
- Sonia Clyne, lately Volunteer Chair, Par Bay Big Local. For services to Community Development in Cornwall.
- Betty Cobley, Volunteer, Royal Voluntary Service Leicester Royal Infirmary Café. For Charitable Service.
- Norman Philip Coe, Coordinator and Chair, Christian Kitchen. For services to tackling Homelessness in the London Borough of Waltham Forest.
- Christopher Stephen Joseph Coley. For services to Sport Administration and to the community in Gloucestershire.
- Jonathan Compton, Chaplaincy Volunteer, H.M. Prison Morton Hall. For services to H.M. Prison and Probation Service.
- Veronica Mary Compton, Chaplaincy Volunteer, H.M. Prison Morton Hall. For services to H.M. Prison and Probation Service.
- Paul Norman Cook. For services to Youth Sport in the London Borough of Barking and Dagenham.
- Wilhelmina Nina Cooper. For services to Charitable Fundraising and to the community in Kent.
- Honor Cousens, Volunteer Manager, Shop Trolley Team, Royal London Hospital. For Charitable Service.
- Kenneth David Cowen, Founder and lately Chief Executive Officer, School of Hard Knocks Charity. For services to Sport and to Charity.
- Emma Louise Mary Cox. For charitable services to the Royal British Legion.
- June Rosemary Cox. For services to the community in Bredhurst, Kent.
- Gail Heather Cramp, Chair, Sunbury and Walton Unit, Sea Cadets. For voluntary service to Young People.
- Anne Croucher, Community Champion Tesco and Volunteer. For services to the community in Dumfries and Galloway.
- Annie Dolores Elizabeth Crowe, Founder and Manager, First Steps Children Centre, Castlederg. For services to Childcare in County Tyrone.
- Margaret Ann Dabell. For services to the community in Wetherby, West Yorkshire.
- Tianna Moquette Dagher, Co-Founder, A Space Between. For services to Tackling Isolation, Loneliness and Anxiety through Art.
- Catherine Anne Dale, Mental Health Nurse, Bradford District Care NHS Foundation Trust. For services to People with Severe Mental Illness.
- Katrina Melanie Daly, Volunteer, Neighbourhood Partnership Eastbourne. For services to the community in Eastbourne.
- David Ronald Dandridge. For services to the community in Clapham, London Borough of Lambeth.
- Rebecca Daniels, Community Children's Matron and Chair, UK Community Children’s Nursing Network and Lead, Children's Community Nursing Project, Queen's Nursing Institute. For services to Clinically Vulnerable and Complex Children and Young People.
- Audrey Muntongi-Darko, Founder, The No1 Befriending Agency. For services to Tackling Loneliness and Isolation in Older People in Scotland.
- David Davidson, Reporting Manager, Nuclear Decommissioning Authority. For services to the Nuclear Decommissioning Authority and to the Education Sector in Cumbria.
- Yvonne Davidson, Beekeeper. For services to Beekeeping in Scotland.
- Elizabeth Fryer Davies. For services to the community in Kimbolton, Herefordshire.
- Michael Francis Davies, Founder, Rayleigh Town Museum. For services to Heritage in Rayleigh, Essex.
- Rachel Elizabeth Davies, Coach and Volunteer, Altrincham Football Club. For services to Sport.
- Margaret Ann Davison. For services to the community in Hoddesdon, Hertfordshire.
- Dr. Peter John Dawson. For services to the community in Lincolnshire.
- Charles Thomas Devlin, Founder, Ireby Festival. For services to the community in Ireby, Cumbria.
- Jennifer Anne Dobson, Volunteer, The Pound Hill and Worth Parent and Toddler Group, Crawley. For services to the community in Crawley, West Sussex.
- John Allen Dunnett. For services to the community in Grundisburgh, Suffolk.
- Ruth Anne Edwards. For services to the community in Mirfield, West Yorkshire.
- Robert James Elliott, lately School Crossing Patrol, Education Authority for Northern Ireland. For services to Education and to the community in County Antrim.
- Sophie Elizabeth Ellis, Co-Organiser, The Norfolk Superheroes. For services to Charity in Norfolk.
- Lee Woolcott-Ellis, Mental Health Lead Manager, Southeastern Railway. For services to Mental Health in Transport.
- Janet Elston, Founder, Triggshire Wind Orchestra and Co-Founder, Cornwall Youth Wind Orchestra. For services to Young People and to Music.
- Dr. Marion Shirley Andrews-Evans, lately Executive Chief Nurse, NHS Gloucestershire Integrated Care Board. For services to Nursing, Health and Care Services.
- Nicholas Richard Hartshorne-Evans, Founder and Chief Executive, Pumping Marvellous Foundation. For services to People with Chronic Heart Failure.
- Lynne Fairclough, Community Volunteer, Merseyside Police. For services to Policing and to the community in Merseyside.
- Roy Farmer, Community First Responder. For services to the community in West Yorkshire.
- Lindsay Faulkner. For services to the community in Ley Hill, Buckinghamshire.
- Mohammad Fayyaz, Town Councillor, Chesham Town Council and Buckinghamshire Council. For services to the community in Chesham.
- Paul Michael Fellows, Chair, Cambridge Astronomical Association. For services to Astronomy.
- Frances Theresa Fenwick. For voluntary service in North Powys.
- Samuel David Ferguson, President, Chair of the Board, Abbey Credit Union. For services to the community of Newtownabbey, County Antrim.
- Kathy Maureen Finlay, Staff Officer, Claims Manager, Roads Claims Unit, Department for Infrastructure, Northern Ireland Civil Service. For Public Service.
- Major Scott Robert Fisher, Ambassador and Fundraiser, Mast Cell Action. For services to Charitable Fundraising for Mast Cell Activation Syndrome.
- Malcolm John Fletcher, lately Secretary, Ely Military Band. For services to the community in Ely, Cambridgeshire.
- Gifford Andrew Foote. For services to the community in Armitage with Handsacre, Staffordshire.
- Rachel Ann Forbes. For services to NHS Primary Care in Northern Ireland.
- Sarah Jane France. For services to the community in Maidenhead, Berkshire.
- Valerie Clare French, Breeze Champion Volunteer, British Cycling. For services to Sport.
- Katherine Friedrich, Founder, People Assisting Torbay’s Homeless. For services to tackling Homelessness in Torbay, Devon.
- Renée Friend, Ambassador, Isabel Hospice. For services to Charity and to the community in Bishop’s Stortford, Hertfordshire.
- Alan John Frost. For services to the community in Abberton, Colchester, Essex.
- Kenneth Lewis Galton, Hurdle Maker. For services to Hazel Coppicing and to Heritage Crafts.
- Julie Elizabeth Gay. For services to the community in Sheffield, South Yorkshire.
- Robin Neville Gell, Judo Coach. For services to Sport and to the community in Bedfordshire.
- Ian Francis Gibb, Volunteer. For services to the community in Earlston.
- Jackson Gibbons, Basketball Academy Director, City of London Academy Southwark. For services to Young People and to Basketball.
- Eileen Lorraine Gibson, Nurse, Social Worker and Area Manager, Northern Health and Social Care Trust. For services to Older People with Dementia and Adults with Learning Disabilities in County Antrim.
- Roy Gibson. For services to Space.
- Matthew Gleaves, Senior Executive Officer, Department for Education. For services to People with Disabilities in Sport.
- William Charles Good, Secretary and Registrar, Wymondham Rugby Club. For services to Sport.
- John David Goulder. For services to Dry Stone Walling and to the community in Rosehall, Sutherland.
- Susan Dorothea Gourlay, Volunteer. For services to the community in the Stewartry of Kirkcudbright.
- Robert Lindsay Graham. For services to Charity and the community in Derbyshire.
- Alaa Mohammed Ali Habbooby, Owner, Café Noir. For services to the community in Thames Ditton, Surrey.
- Kay Frances Haffenden, Chair, Kamelia Kids Day Care and Beach Schools, Goring by Sea, West Sussex. For services to Early Years.
- David John Haines, Lifeboat Operations Manager, Looe Lifeboat Station, Royal National Lifeboat Institution. For services to Maritime Safety.
- Emily Halban, Co-Founder, A Space Between. For services to Tackling Isolation, Loneliness and Anxiety through Art.
- Richard Gresham Haley, Postmaster, Epworth Post Office. For services to the Post Office and to the community in Doncaster.
- Leon Hall. For Charitable Service.
- Kathleen Jane Hamilton, lately Theatre Manager and Administrator. For services to Theatre.
- Paul Ray Hannaford. For services to the community in Romford, London Borough of Havering.
- John Barry Hardy, Volunteer, Blind Veterans UK and the Bridgwater Community Hub. For services to the Veteran Community.
- Trevor Charles Harrop, Co-Founder, The Avon Roach Project. For services to Angling.
- Carly Hart, Neighbourhood Support Officer, Cardiff East, South Wales Police. For services to Policing and to the community in Cardiff.
- Ann Veronica Harvey, lately Nursery Teacher and Chair of Governors, Bentilee Nursery School, Stoke-on-Trent. For services to Early Years.
- Judith Harvey, Warden Manager, Brecon Beacons National Park Authority. For services to the Bannau Brycheiniog (Brecon Beacons) National Park.
- Benjamin Lee Thomas Hawkins, Emergency Dispatcher and Community First Responder, East of England Ambulance Service NHS Trust. For services to Emergency Care, Staff Wellbeing and Mental Health.
- Conway Keith Hawkins. For services to Young People.
- Michelle Hawkins, Foster Carer, Fostering Solutions, West Midlands. For services to Foster Care.
- Simon Hawkins, Foster Carer, Fostering Solutions, West Midlands. For services to Foster Care.
- Audrey Phyllis Hayter. For services to the community in Witchampton, Dorset.
- Colleen Patricia Healy, lately Foster Carer, Plymouth City Council. For services to Foster Care.
- David Richard Healy, lately Foster Carer, Plymouth City Council. For services to Foster Care.
- Paul Dominic Heitzman, lately Senior Education Advisor. For services to Education.
- Tracey Jane Hemming, Director, Freedom Day Centre, Evesham. For services to Young People and Adults with Special Educational Needs and Disabilities.
- Marion Veronica Hemsworth, Co-Founder, J&M Running. For services to Wellbeing and to the community in West Sussex.
- Roy Arthur Heppenstall, President, Newton-le-Willows Unit, Sea Cadets. For voluntary service to Young People and to Veterans.
- Hemandra Hindocha, Postmaster, Westcotes Post Office. For services to the Post Office and to the community in the Midlands.
- Catherine Barbara Hitchens. For services to the community in Fifield, Oxfordshire.
- Wendy Hobbs, Ambassador and Board Member, Dreams and Wishes Charity. For Voluntary and Charitable Service.
- Jeremy Nigel Holland, Police Support Volunteer, North Yorkshire Police. For services to Policing.
- Joseph Ralph Homer, Volunteer, Eastbourne and District Samaritans. For services to Vulnerable People.
- Carole Evelynne Hopkins. For services to the community of Magor, Monmouthshire.
- Rosemary Howell DL. For services to Girlguiding and to the community in Devon.
- Jayne Helena Hughes, Founder, Amy and Friends. For services to Children with Rare Disorders and their Families.
- Peter Hulatt. For services to the Camden Garden Centre Charitable Trust.
- Barry George Hyde. For services to the community in Rossendale, Lancashire.
- Dr. Saara Mary Jane Jackson, Finance and Briefing Hub Lead, Government Office for Science. For services to Science in Government and to the Scientific Community.
- David John James, Secretary, Ceredigion County Bowling Association. For Voluntary Service.
- Andrew Vaughan John, Chair, Aberavon Rugby Football Club. For services to Charity and to Business.
- Brian Allan Johnson, Chair, Friends of Didsbury Park. For services to Charity and to the community in Didsbury, Greater Manchester.
- Sarah Elizabeth Johnston (Sally Johnston), lately Principal's Personal Assistant, Banbridge Academy. For services to Education and to the community in County Down.
- Suzey Elizabeth Joseph, Homeless Health Clinical Lead, Nottingham Citycare. For services to tackling Homelessness in Nottinghamshire.
- Enoch Kanagaraj, Founder, One Vision and Vice-Chair, Hertfordshire County Interfaith. For services to Charity and to the community in Hertfordshire.
- Alison Jayne Kay, Musician, Teacher and Trustee, Poole Society for Young Musicians. For services to the Arts and to Young People.
- Karen Mary Kelly, Head Coach, Lanark Amateur Swimming Club. For Voluntary Service.
- Sarah Kelly, Unit Catering Supervisor, Education Authority Northern Ireland. For services to Education Catering in the Primary School Sector in Northern Ireland.
- David Antony Kemp, Strategic Community Safety Manager, East Sussex Fire and Rescue Service. For services to Community Safety.
- Michael Keogh, Director, Springfield Youth Club, London Borough of Hackney. For services to Young People in London.
- John Dyson Kingham. For services to the community in Luton, Bedfordshire.
- Robert David Kirkland. For services to the Music Industry in Northern Ireland.
- Paula Klein. For services to Young People in Classical Music in Northern Ireland.
- Jaswinder Kumar, President, Management Committee of Sri Guru Ravidass Sabha Bedford. For Charitable Services in Bedford.
- Alan Malcolm Kurtz, Proprietor and Manager, Fishers Chemist, South Norwood, London Borough of Croydon. For services to Community Pharmacy.
- Jennifer Lamboll, Police Staff Supervisor, Contact Management Centre, Thames Valley Police. For services to Policing.
- Kelvin Langford, Volunteer Coordinator, Civilian Services Contingent. For services to the Civilian Services Contingent and to the Veteran Community in Newark.
- Jessica Margaret Lapping, Co-Organiser, The Norfolk Superhero Challenge. For services to Charity in Norfolk.
- William Macfarlane Lawson, Genealogist. For services to the community in the Western Isles.
- Gillian Frances Lee, lately Parliamentary Office Manager. For services to Parliament.
- Trystan Wyn Lewis, Facilities Support Manager, Ysbyty Gwynedd, Bangor. For services to Patient Health and Wellbeing.
- Alexander Gordon Lindsay. For services to Education in Lisburn, County Antrim.
- Margaret Lines. For services to the community in Hatfield Heath, Essex.
- Diane Locke. For services to the community of Penrhiwceiber, Rhondda Cynon Taf.
- Dr. Chantal Lavina Mary Fowler Lockey, Founder and Chief Executive Officer, The Foundation for Infant Loss Training. For services to Bereavement Care and to Reducing Infant Mortality.
- Joan Lockley, Founder and Coordinator, West Midlands Hedgehog Rescue. For services to Wildlife.
- Mark Long, Founding Team Member and Producer, Sawston Youth Drama. For services to Musical Theatre for Young People in Cambridgeshire.
- Kathy Loughride, Fundraiser, Marie Curie. For services to Marie Curie in Northern Ireland.
- Robert Alan Love, Bowler and Ambassador, International Disabled Bowlers. For services to Sport and to People with Disabilities.
- Deborah Anne Lowe, Chair and Director, Youth Onstage. For services to Musical Theatre in the West Midlands.
- Paul Knight Lucas JP. For services to Education and to Charity.
- Janet MacGregor, Owner and Senior Manager, Smithfield House Children's Nursery, City of London. For services to Early Years.
- Morag Mackay, Volunteer. For services to Children Living with Disabilities.
- Alexander John Mackintosh. For services to Nairn County Football Club.
- Alexandra MacLeod, Founder, The BIG Project. For services to the community in Broomhouse, Edinburgh.
- Sally Kate Martiello, Manager, Oakley Kindergarten, Bedford. For services to Early Years and to the community in Bedford.
- Jean Eveline Martin. For services to the community in Greater Manchester.
- James Edwin Masters, Chair, Grange Big Local and Co-Founder, Amazing Communities Together. For services to the community in East Finchley, London Borough of Barnet.
- Glynis Mates, Childminder Adviser. For services to Early Years.
- Dr. Anne McArthur, Committee Member, Banffshire Branch, Royal Scottish Country Dancing Society. For services to Scottish Country Dancing and to the community in Portsoy, Banffshire.
- The Right Reverend Monsignor Bryan McCanny, Parish Priest. For services to the community in Limavady, County Londonderry.
- Michael Joseph Walter McCarthy, Government Whips Office, Cabinet Office. For Parliamentary and Public Service.
- Elizabeth Devlin McClurg, Volunteer. For services to Wildlife and the community in Merkinch.
- Sandra McConnell. For services to Mental Health and to Young People with Learning Disabilities.
- Stuart McCourt, Commanding Officer, Whitehaven Unit, Sea Cadets. For voluntary service to Young People and to the Environment.
- Mary Catherine McCoy, Clinical Services Manager, Emergency Medicine Antrim Area Hospital Northern Health and Social Services Trust. For voluntary services to tackling Homelessness in Belfast.
- Martin Carter McCullough. For services to Junior and Para Archery in Northern Ireland.
- Siobhan Marie McElnea, Probation Officer and Victim Liaison Officer, Probation Board for Northern Ireland. For services to Victims of Crime and to the Criminal Justice System.
- Lorraine McInnes, Volunteer Fundraising Campaigner, Maggie’s Glasgow. For services to Charity.
- Barclay Keith McIntosh, Advocacy Volunteer. For services to the community in Fife.
- Stuart McKenzie, Volunteer. For services to the community in Pollokshields and Glasgow.
- Susanne McEwan McKenzie, Volunteer. For services to the community in Pollokshields and Glasgow.
- Donald Robin Mead, Vice-President and lately Chair, The Oscar Wilde Society. For services to Literature.
- Stephen Robert Merridew, Specialist Training Manager, Medical Biochemistry, Swansea Bay University Health Board. For services to the NHS.
- Patricia Ann Merry, Chair, Corbett Community Library Board. For services to the community in Catford, London Borough of Lewisham.
- Safeena Karen Mohammed, Foster Carer, Warwickshire County Council. For services to Foster Care.
- Janet Susan Monk, Joint District Commissioner, Chadlington Brownies, Charlbury District. For services to Young People.
- Dennis Edward Moore. For services to the community in Orpington, London Borough of Bromley.
- Richard Frederick Moore. For services to Music Education and Preservation in East Sussex.
- Alison Jane Moorey, lately Chief Executive, St. Wilfrid's Hospice, Chichester. For services to Palliative Care.
- Jacqueline Morgan, Manager, King Square Nursery, London. For services to Early Years and to Families.
- Alexander James Morrice. For services to the community in Corhampton and Meonstoke, Hampshire.
- Maureen Morris, Board Member, Easterhouse Citizens' Advice Bureau. For services to the community in Easterhouse.
- Susan Jean Mountain, Campaigner. For services to Public Health and Supporting People to Give Up Smoking.
- Allan Craig Muirhead. For services to the community in Kirkby Lonsdale, Cumbria.
- Alexandra Munro, Volunteer. For services to the community in Ardchattan, Argyll.
- Wendy Patricia Murray. For Voluntary Service.
- Preshanthi Devarani Navaratnam, Executive Assistant, Department for Education. For Public, Voluntary and Charitable Service.
- Thomas William Neill. For services to Local Rugby in Northern Ireland.
- Mark Newey, lately Coach, Referee, Chair and President, Haywards Heath Rugby Club. For services to Grassroots Rugby.
- Fiona Catherine Newnham (Fiona Brothers), lately Powerboat Racer and Cricket Scorer, England and Wales Cricket Board. For services to Sport.
- Charles Bruce Nicolson. For voluntary and charitable service in the Western Isles.
- Andrew Nisbet, Community Volunteer. For services to the community in Yell.
- Dr. David Hamilton Nunn, lately Researcher, Nottinghamshire County Council. For voluntary service to the Great War Memorial.
- Elizabeth O'Hanlon. For services to the Environment and to Sustainability in Rainham, Kent.
- Kathleen Marie O'Malley, Project Manager, Social Performance, Network Rail. For services to the Railway and to tackling Homelessness.
- Ann Patricia Osborn, Chief Executive Officer, The Rural Coffee Caravan Information Project. For services to Older People and Combatting Loneliness in the communities of Suffolk and Norfolk.
- Kevin Osei, Founder, Bridging Barriers. For services to Young People.
- Asma Pandor, Lead Admiral Nurse, Dementia UK, Gloucestershire Hospitals NHS Foundation Trust. For services to Nursing.
- Russell John Parker, Founder, Meopham Sports and Leisure Association. For services to the community in Meopham, Kent.
- Richard Gavin Rowland Griffiths Parry, Accompanist. For services to Music and to Choral Singing.
- Robert Patchett. For services to the community in Mease Valley, Staffordshire.
- David Stuart Paterson, Founder, Unity in Poverty Action. For services to Disadvantaged People in Leeds, West Yorkshire.
- Mavis Margaret Paterson, Fundraiser. For services to Charitable Fundraising.
- Rosemary Adele Pavoni, Chair, West Sussex Partners in Care. For services to Social Care.
- Jacqueline Anita Pell, Councillor, Braintree District Council. For services to Local Government and to the community in Halstead, Essex.
- Michael John Perrin, President, Melksham Town Football Club. For services to Grassroots Football and to the community in Melksham, Wiltshire.
- Robert John Philips. For services to the community in Portsoy and District.
- Roberta Violet Phillips, Chair, Maghera Cancer Research Committee. For Charitable Services.
- Patricia Dolores Pile, Facilities Manager, UK Export Finance. For Public and Voluntary Service.
- Karen Pitt, Senior Telecoms Engineer, Driver and Vehicle Licensing Agency. For services to Science, Technology, Engineering and Mathematics Skills.
- Doreen Edna Mary Courtney Pitts. For services to the Girls Brigade and to the community in County Antrim.
- John David Polley. For services to the Boxted Methodist Silver Band in Essex.
- Roberta Ruth Quinn, Catering Manager, Youth Justice Agency. For services to the Youth Justice System.
- Dr. Roger David Ransome. For services to Bat Conservation.
- Marek Regan, Police Community Support Officer, Metropolitan Police Service. For services to Community Sport.
- Stephen Gerrard Rigby, Founder, The Children’s Chess Club (3Cs). For services to Young People.
- Jane Ann Robinson. For services to Charity and to the community in West Yorkshire.
- Julie Robinson, Foster Carer, Wirral County Council, Wirral, Merseyside. For services to Foster Care.
- Susan Caroline Rodger. For services to the community in Thames Ditton, Surrey.
- Anne Rooke, Cleaning Supervisor, Castle Douglas High School, Dumfries and Galloway. For services to Education and to the community in Castle Douglas.
- Corinne Rosalie Rowe, Emergency Response Volunteer, Bracknell, British Red Cross. For voluntary service to the Red Cross.
- Belinda Louise Rowlands, Founder, Manager and Trustee, The Seed Box. For services to Adults and Children with Additional Support Needs.
- Suzanne Amanda Ruggles, Founder and Chief Executive, Full Circle Fund Therapies. For services to Patients and Carers in the NHS.
- Lesley Caron Rutherford, Nurse Consultant, Marie Curie, Belfast Health and Social Care Trust and Queen’s University, Belfast. For services to Palliative Care Patients.
- Aisha Younis Abdus Samad, Short Breaks Carer, Slough Children First, Berkshire. For services to Children and Young People with SEND.
- Kamran Ishaq Abdus Samad, Short Breaks Carer, Slough Children First, Berkshire. For services to Children and Young People with SEND.
- Steadman Earl Scott, Coach. For services to Young People and to Sport.
- Alison Marie Semmence, Chief Executive, York Centre for Voluntary Service. For services to Social Prescribing.
- Pat Haste Shakespeare, Superintendent, Portland Division, St. John Ambulance. For services to Community First Aid in Portland.
- Kasim Mohamed Sharifi, Foster Carer, Warwickshire County Council. For services to Foster Care.
- Phillip John Siddell, Co-Owner, Humpty Dumpty Day Nurseries Ltd., and Trustee, National Day Nurseries Association, West Midlands. For services to the Early Years, to Childcare and to the Charitable Sector.
- Balbir Singh (Balbir Singh Khanpur Bhujhamgy), Musician. For services to Bhangra Music and to Punjabi Culture in the West Midlands.
- Colin Andrew Small. For services to the Duke of Edinburgh’s Award in County Tyrone.
- David Smith, Police Sergeant, North Wales Police. For services to the community in North Wales and to Charity.
- James Burns Smith, Librarian, Scottish Fire and Rescue Service. For services to Fire and Rescue in Scotland.
- William Smith, Police Community Support Officer, Metropolitan Police Service. For services to Policing.
- Valerie June Snowden, President, Hospital Broadcasting Association. For services to Hospital, Health and Wellbeing Broadcasting.
- William John Norman Somerville. For services to the community of Limavady, County Londonderry.
- Brian Thomas Speight, President, Espada Fencing Club. For services to Fencing.
- Barbara Julie Spiby, Manager, Clifton Playgroup, Rugby. For services to Early Years and to Childcare.
- Carol Ann Sproule. For services to Nursing and to the community in County Tyrone.
- Christopher William Sprules, Volunteer, Sustrans. For services to Cycling and to the community in West Sussex.
- Kathleen Elaine Stout, Lunch Club Volunteer, Royal Voluntary Service. For Charitable Services.
- Diana Antoinette Sykes, lately Director, Fife Contemporary. For services to Visual Arts and Craft in Fife.
- Sarah-Louise Taggart, Scout Leader. For services to Scouting and to the community in Downpatrick.
- Joanne Taylor, Patient Advocate. For services to Breast Cancer Patients.
- Jill Marianne Terrell. For services to Libraries.
- Sarah Anne Thomas, Chair, Ilkley Arts, Trustee, Ilkley Manor House Trust and Chair, Manor House Trust. For voluntary and charitable services in Ilkley, West Yorkshire.
- Fiona Louise Thompson, Chair, Keighley Big Local and Founder, Cafe Eden. For services to the community in Keighley, West Yorkshire.
- Mervyn Thompson, Director, Parkrun Portrush. For services to the community in Portrush, County Antrim.
- Victoria Livingstone-Thompson, Chief Executive, Inclusion Gloucestershire. For services to Mental Health and to People with Disabilities in Gloucestershire.
- Elizabeth Caroline Ann Toll, Local Ambassador Volunteer, Carers UK. For services to Unpaid Carers.
- Sharon Olga Tomlin, Community Organiser, Sobus. For services to the Black Community in the London Borough of Hammersmith and Fulham.
- Eileen Rosemary Harrison-Topham. For services to the communities in East and North Yorkshire.
- Myfanwy Mair Tothill, Chair, LeatherHead Start. For services to tackling Homelessness in Surrey.
- Christopher Trewern. For services to the community in Ponsanooth, Cornwall.
- Frederick George Tucker. For services to the community in Awbridge, Hampshire.
- Judith Mary Charlotte Turner. For services to the community in Fernhurst, West Sussex.
- Ian Walker, Secretary, Rotherham Community Football Club. For services to Sport and to the community in Rotherham.
- Margaret Waring, Independent Living Manager, Portland Charity, Nottinghamshire. For services to People with Disabilities or Social Care Needs.
- Maureen Webber, Deputy Leader and Councillor for Rhydyfelin Central, Rhondda Cynon Taf Council. For services to the community in Rhydyfelin.
- Celia Elizabeth Brierley Webster, Founder, The Challenge Group, and Co-Founder, Wave for Change, London. For services to Children and People with Special Educational Needs and Disabilities.
- Kenneth White, Co-Founder and Trustee, Supershoes. For services to Children and Young People with Paediatric Cancer.
- Sarah Louise White, Co-Founder and Chief Executive Officer, Supershoes. For services to Children and Young People with Paediatric Cancer.
- Margaret Wilkinson. For services to the community in Holton- Le- Clay, Lincolnshire.
- Philip Wilkinson, lately Crew Manager, Cheshire Fire and Rescue Service. For services to the community of Nantwich.
- Leon William Wilks. For Public Service.
- Timothy John Beech Williamson, Architect, Department for Education. For services to Education.
- Dr. Doirean Luvurn Wilson, lately Associate Professor, Human Resource Management, Middlesex University. For services to Equality and Diversity in Education.
- John Philip Wilson, Chief Executive Officer, Liverpool Seafarers Centre. For services to Seafarers' Welfare.
- Lilian June Winter. For services to the St. Elizabeth Hospice, Framlingham, Suffolk.
- Oliver Winston Wood, lately UK Youth Commissioner. For services to Young People.
- Colin Woodford, Chair and Facilitator, North East Lincolnshire Disability Sports Forum. For services to Disabled People and to the community in North East Lincolnshire.
- Claire Wooldridge, Firefighter, Warwickshire Fire and Rescue Service. For services to Charity.
- Christopher John Young, Health Physics Monitor, Sellafield Ltd. For services to Positive Safety Culture and to Male Mental Health.
- Sheila Rose Taylor-Young, Postwoman, The Royal Mail. For services to the community in the London Borough of Bromley.

=== Distinguished Service Order ===
Ribbon bar of the Distinguished Service Order

==== Companion of the Distinguished Service Order (DSO) ====
- Colonel Alistair Carns, OBE, MC, Royal Marines, N029561Y.

=== Royal Red Cross ===
Ribbon of the Royal Red Cross

==== Member of the Royal Red Cross (RRC) ====
- Lieutenant Colonel Lucy Rachel Gaal, Royal Army Medical Service, 549239

==== Associates of the Royal Red Cross (ARRC) ====
- Lieutenant Commander Kim Cockcroft, Queen Alexandra’s Royal Naval Nursing Service, Y003690V.
- Major Paul Amos Simms, Royal Army Medical Service, B8424335.

=== King's Police Medal (KPM) ===
Ribbon of the King's Police Medal for Distinguished Service

England and Wales

- Mark Colin Baker, lately Detective Chief Superintendent, Merseyside Police.
- Nicola Louise Bryar, lately Detective Chief Superintendent, West Yorkshire Police.
- Ross Dorman, lately Constable, Kent Police.
- Matthew Hardcastle, Constable, Metropolitan Police Service.
- Emma Laura Harris, Detective Sergeant, Metropolitan Police Service.
- Gary Martin Haskins, Detective Superintendent, Avon and Somerset Police.
- Christopher Haward, Chief Constable, Lincolnshire Police / National Police Chiefs’ Council.
- Ian William Hunter, lately Detective Chief Superintendent, Thames Valley Police.
- Mohammed Osman Khan, Assistant Chief Constable, West Yorkshire Police.
- Mark Jeffrey O'Dell, Inspector, Metropolitan Police Service.
- Trevor Brian Rodenhurst, Chief Constable, Bedfordshire Police.
- Kathryn Thacker, Detective Chief Superintendent, Norfolk Constabulary.
- Justin Matthew Twigg, lately Detective Inspector, West Yorkshire Police.
- Matthew Twist, Assistant Commissioner, Metropolitan Police Service.
- Jeremy Mark Vaughan, Chief Constable, South Wales Police.
- James Roger Weems, lately Chief Superintendent, Thames Valley Police.
- Michael Philip West, lately Detective Superintendent, Devon and Cornwall Police.

Scotland

- Shaheen Baber, Superintendent, Police Service of Scotland.
- Alan Spiers, Deputy Chief Constable, Police Service of Scotland.

Northern Ireland

- Samuel Donaldson, Chief Superintendent, Police Service of Northern Ireland.
- Melanie Jones, Temporary Assistant Chief Constable, Police Service of Northern Ireland.
- Jeremy Lindsay, Chief Superintendent, Police Service of Northern Ireland

=== King's Fire Service Medal (KFSM) ===
Ribbon of the King's Fire Service Medal for Distinguished Service

England and Wales

- Steven John Healey, Deputy Chief Fire Officer, Lancashire Fire and Rescue Service.
- Glynn Luznyj, Deputy Chief Fire Officer, Staffordshire Fire and Rescue Service.
- Robert Somerled MacDougall, Chief Fire Officer, Oxfordshire County Council Fire and Rescue Service.
- Ian Alexander McDougall, Assistant Chief Officer, Defence Fire and Rescue Service.
- Jonathon Peter Pryce, Chief Fire Officer, Hereford and Worcester Fire and Rescue Service.
- Rachel Louise Streeting, lately Firefighter, Warwickshire Fire and Rescue Service

Scotland

- Bruce Farquharson, Head of Training, Scottish Fire and Rescue Service.
- Karla Stevenson, Station Commander, Scottish Fire and Rescue Service.

=== King's Ambulance Service Medal (KAM) ===
Ribbon of the King's Ambulance Service Medal

England and Wales

- Darren Frank Farmer, Director of Ambulance Operations, London Ambulance Service.
- Lisa Michelle Ward, Director of People, North West Ambulance Service.

Scotland

- Kenneth Harold Freeburn, Regional Director East, Scottish Ambulance Service.

=== King's Volunteer Reserves Medal (KVRM) ===
Ribbon of the King's Volunteer Reserves Medal

- Captain Paul Terence Hill RD, Royal Naval Reserve, C993655M.
- Lieutenant Colonel Anita Fiona Marina Newcourt MBE, TD, VR, Army Air Corps, Army Reserve, 527329.
- Major Sean Augustine Olohan VR, The Royal Yeomanry, Army Reserve, 534142.
- Colour Sergeant Alan George Taggart VR, The Royal Irish Regiment, Army Reserve, 30034046.
- Captain Timothy Young VR, Corps of Royal Engineers, Army Reserve, 24704803.
- Corporal Sean Gregory Doughty, Royal Air Force, 30185672.
- Warrant Officer Christopher Richard Ward, Royal Air Force, V0215989.

=== Overseas Territories Police Medal (OTPM) ===
Ribbon of the Overseas Territories Police Medal

- Melina Papagregoriou, Chief Inspector Operations and Intelligence, Sovereign Base Areas Police. For services to policing in the Sovereign Base Areas.
- Constandinos Petrou, Police Superintendent, Sovereign Base Areas Police. For services to policing and to safeguarding in the Sovereign Base Areas.

=== Mentioned in dispatches ===
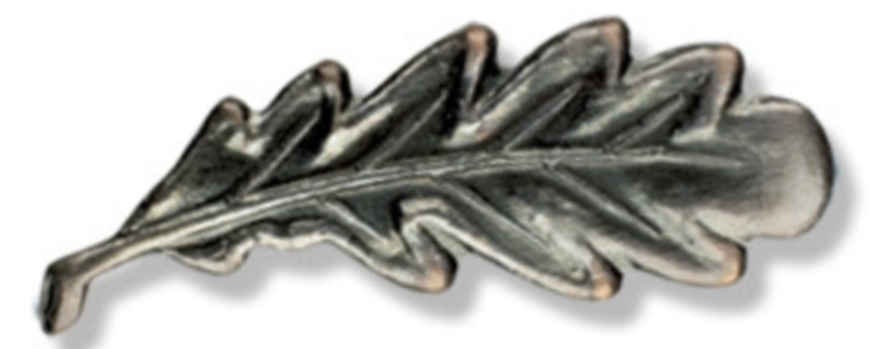
Mentioned in dispatches device

- Lieutenant Commander Daniel Owen-Hughes, Royal Navy, 30124126.
- Lieutenant Commander Matthew Peter Johnson, Royal Navy, 30143794.
- Able Seaman (First Class) (Abovewater Warfare Weapons) Marli Winton, Royal Navy, 30367363.
- Flight Lieutenant Peter James Morris, Royal Air Force, 30080824.

=== King's Commendation for Valuable Service ===
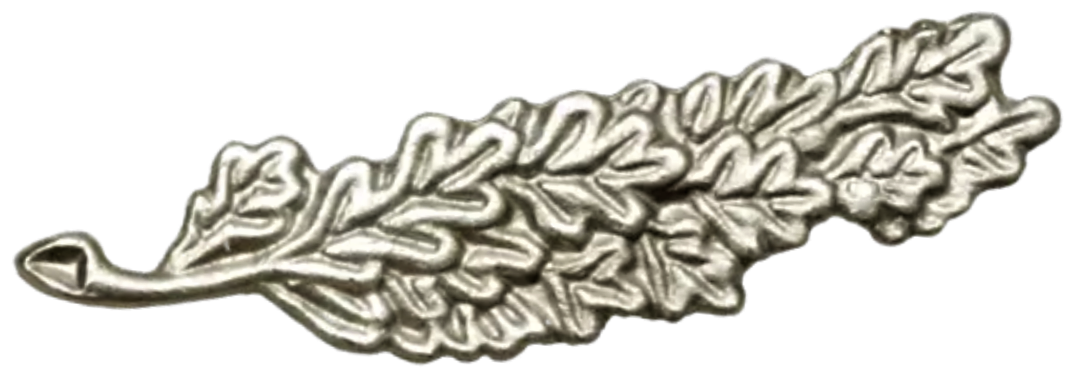
King's Commendation for Valuable Service device

- Commander David Morgan Armstrong, Royal Navy, C040525J.
- Lieutenant Commander Nikolai Edward Pilkington L’Vov-Basirov, Royal Navy, 30124778.
- Lieutenant Commander James Paul Bradshaw, Royal Navy, 30044577.
- Petty Officer Warfare Specialist (Abovewater Warfare Tactical) Reuben Charles Bryan Homewood, Royal Navy, 30193484.
- Lieutenant Matthew Richard Poxon, Royal Navy, 30117505.
- Lieutenant Commander Katie Romanowska, Queen Alexandra’s Royal Naval Nursing Service, W146091T.
- Corporal Brandon Lee Blackman, Intelligence Corps, 30315554.
- Major Esther Louise Caddy, Adjutant General’s Corps (Educational and Training Service Branch), 30207473.
- Warrant Officer Class 2 Richard Paul Hood, Intelligence Corps, 25192956.
- Lieutenant Thomas James Alexander Wood, The Royal Yorkshire Regiment, 30314554.

=== Meritorious Service Medal ===
Ribbon of the Meritorious Service Medal

- Warrant Officer 1 (Exec) S J Baker
- Warrant Officer 1 WS (Submarines) P I Brooke
- Warrant Officer 1 Engineering Technician (Marine Engineering Submarines) W J Burt
- Warrant Officer 1 Warfare Specialist (Above Water Warfare Tactical) W J Cook
- Warrant Officer 1 Engineering Technician (Marine Engineering) B M Cooper
- Warrant Officer 1 Warfare Specialist (Above Water Warfare Tactical) A Crawford
- Warrant Officer 1 (Diver) K E Fenwick, QGM
- Chief Engineering Technician (Weapon Engineering) G L Flowers
- Warrant Officer 1 (Exec) J P Garvey
- Chief Petty Officer (Air Engineering Technician) S B D Gavin
- Warrant Officer 1 (Air Engineering Technician) D M Haseltine
- Warrant Officer 1 (Exec) D Hemmings
- Warrant Officer 2 J D A Hill Royal Marines
- Lieutenant A Hurley Royal Navy
- Chief Petty Officer (Aircrewman) P J Hutton
- Chief Petty Officer (Diver) M E Jacobs
- Chief Petty Officer (Int) A E Morton
- Chief Petty Officer Engineering Technician (Marine Engineering Submarines) R S O’Callaghan
- Warrant Officer 1 Engineering Technician (Marine Engineering) D A Rogers
- Warrant Officer 1 N R Shutt Royal Marines
- Warrant Officer 2 Air Engineering Technician (Avionics) D Stanley
- Warrant Officer 1 (Diver) R J Walker
- Warrant Officer 1 Engineering Technician (Marine Engineering) G M Wilson
- Warrant Officer Class One Joseph Jackson Amankwaa Abakah, Royal Engineers
- Warrant Officer Class Two Suren Ball, The Rifles
- Warrant Officer Class One Michael Stephen Bellars, Royal Electrical and Mechanical Engineers
- Warrant Officer Class One Mark Bright, Army Air Corps (now Army Reserve)
- Warrant Officer Class One Niall Duncan Cameron, Army Air Corps
- Warrant Officer Class Two Adam John Coakley, Royal Army Medical Service
- Warrant Officer Class One Hayley Simone Cornforth, Adjutant General’s Corps (Staff and Personnel Support)
- Warrant Officer Class One Dominic Neil Daniel Cross, Royal Engineers
- Warrant Officer Class One Andrew John Devlin, Irish Guards
- Warrant Officer Class One Mathew Mark Frederick Eade, Royal Army Veterinary Corps
- Warrant Officer Class Two Gavin Robert Elliot, Intelligence Corps
- Warrant Officer Class One Andrew Lee Fidrmuc, Royal Electrical and Mechanical Engineers
- Warrant Officer Class One Daniel Michael Freeman, The Parachute Regiment
- Warrant Officer Class One (now Captain) Jayandra Garbuja, The Queen’s Gurkha Engineers
- Staff Sergeant Steven John Griffiths, Royal Signals
- Warrant Officer Class Two Edward Michael Haynes, The Parachute Regiment
- Staff Sergeant Martin Graham Herrington, Royal Electrical and Mechanical Engineers
- Warrant Officer Class One Christopher Stuart Hey, Army Air Corps
- Warrant Officer Class One (now Captain) Adrian Matthew Hinks, The Rifles
- Staff Sergeant Paul Anthony Holland, Royal Electrical and Mechanical Engineers
- Warrant Officer Class One Paul Michael Hurton, Royal Electrical and Mechanical Engineers
- Warrant Officer Class Two Carl Anthony Phillip Jackson, Royal Artillery
- Warrant Officer Class One (now Captain) Ryan Kirkbright, The Royal Yorkshire Regiment
- Warrant Officer Class One Andrew Lamont, The Parachute Regiment
- Warrant Officer Class Two Russell John Lehman, Royal Artillery
- Warrant Officer Class One Samantha Martin, The Royal Logistic Corps
- Warrant Officer Class Two Paul David McGinnity, Army Air Corps (now Army Reserve)
- Warrant Officer Class One Dianne Mairie Miller, Royal Electrical and Mechanical Engineers
- Warrant Officer Class One (now Captain) Jon Miller, Adjutant General’s Corps (Royal Military Police)
- Warrant Officer Class One Christopher James Mills, The Royal Regiment of Fusiliers
- Warrant Officer Class One John Neal Morris, Intelligence Corps
- Warrant Officer Class One Graham Patterson, The Royal Logistic Corps
- Warrant Officer Class One Dean Anthony Penn, Royal Engineers
- Warrant Officer Class One Neil James Perkins, MBE, The Royal Logistic Corps
- Warrant Officer Class One Peter Edmund Poole, The Royal Logistic Corps
- Warrant Officer Class One (now Captain) Simon Anthony Rose, Royal Electrical and Mechanical Engineers
- Warrant Officer Class Two Louise Jane Sheppard, Army Air Corps
- Warrant Officer Class One Sharon Smith, Adjutant General’s Corps (Staff and Personnel Support)
- Warrant Officer Class Two Robert Geoffrey Stacey, The Royal Logistic Corps
- Warrant Officer Class One Mark Nicholas Stephen, Adjutant General’s Corps (Staff and Personnel Support)
- Warrant Officer Class One Sherbahadur Tangnami, Brigade of Gurkhas
- Warrant Officer Class One David Joseph Todd, The Royal Logistic Corps
- Warrant Officer Class One Jamie John Tyson, The Rifles
- Warrant Officer Class Two Nicholas Paul Warren, The Royal Welsh
- Warrant Officer Class Two Phillip Glenn Williams, The Royal Logistic Corps
- Master Aircrew M.A. Bradley, MBE
- Warrant Officer S.R. Foulkes
- Warrant Officer A.J. Gillett
- Warrant Officer L.J. Goupillot
- Warrant Officer J.E. Henderson-Bowyer
- Warrant Officer C.A. Jones
- Master Aircrew G.E. Mallam
- Warrant Officer K.C. Mason
- Warrant Officer D.S. Moore
- Warrant Officer S. Rezazadeh-Wilson
- Warrant Officer G.P. Smith
- Warrant Officer T. Stead
- Warrant Officer A. Thomas, MBE
- Acting Warrant Officer G.F. Bleasdale
- Acting Warrant Officer N.M. Cooper
- Acting Warrant Officer M.C. McDonald
- Acting Master Aircrew R.M. White
- Flight Sergeant D.F. Beattie
- Flight Sergeant A.D. Gray
- Flight Sergeant D.M. Swift, MBE
- Sergeant (now Flight Sergeant) L. Bibby

== Overseas and International ==
=== The Most Excellent Order of the British Empire ===
==== Commander of the Order of the British Empire (CBE) ====
- Michael Henry Dunkley, formerly Premier of Bermuda. For services to Bermuda.
- Dr Anthony Freeman, Scientist and Engineer, Jet Propulsion Laboratory, NASA. For services to UK/US Relations in Space and Earth Science.

==== Officer of the Order of the British Empire (OBE) ====
- Carey Allan, Team Leader, Foreign, Commonwealth and Development Office. For services to British Foreign Policy.
- David Michael Anderson, Senior Health Adviser, UK-Med. For services to the UK’s Emergency Health Response overseas.
- Dr Jonathan Andrew Brewer, formerly Acting Coordinator of the UN Panel of Experts created pursuant to resolution 1874 (2009). For services to Global Non-Proliferation of Weapons of Mass Destruction.
- Rupert Goodman
- James Hoare
- Erich Hoyt
- Timothy Insoll

==== Member of the Order of the British Empire (MBE) ====
- Shantell Martin

=== British Empire Medal (BEM) ===
- Jane Alison Basta, Consular Officer, British Vice Consulate Zakynthos. For services to British Nationals in Greece.
- David Richard Bellis, Founder, Gwulo. For services to Heritage Preservation in Hong Kong.
- Dr. Derek Francis Gallagher, lately Vice-Chairman, The Friends of St. George’s Memorial Church, Ypres, Belgium. For services to Charity.
- Edward Gant, lately Team Leader, Foreign, Commonwealth and Development Office. For services to British Foreign Policy.
- Edward John Godfrey, President, the British Historical Society of Portugal. For services to the Local Community in Portugal.
- Debra Marie Hemming, Desk Officer, Foreign, Commonwealth and Development Office. For services to National Security.
- Helen Lorraine Jones, Desk Officer, Foreign, Commonwealth and Development Office. For services to National Security.
- Elizabeth Ann Keegan, Director, Lloret Tourist Board, Spain. For services to British Nationals in Girona, Spain.
- Barbara Laing, Founder, Mnyakongo School Project, Kongwa Connected, Tanzania. For services to Education in Kongwa, Tanzania.
- Andrew David John Letchford, Team Leader, Foreign, Commonwealth and Development Office. For services to British Foreign Policy.
- Craig Ian Lucie, Murder and Manslaughter Case Worker, Consular Directorate, Foreign, Commonwealth and Development Office. For services to British Nationals overseas.
- Frances McConvey, Head of Music, John Gray High School, Cayman Islands. For services to Music Education in the Cayman Islands.
- Keith Orton, Chairman, Bergen Hohne Branch of Royal British Legion, Germany. For services to The Royal British Legion in Germany and UK/Germany relations.
- Nalini Sadai, Head, Murder and Manslaughter Case Team, Consular Directorate, Foreign, Commonwealth and Development Office. For services to British Nationals overseas.
- Ashley Dawn Whittal, Estates Network Manager, British High Commission Ottawa. For services to the British High Commission in Ottawa, Canada.

== Crown Dependencies ==
=== The Most Excellent Order of the British Empire ===
==== Officer of the Order of the British Empire (OBE) ====
Guernsey

- Lyndon Sean Trott. For services to Guernsey

==== Member of the Order of the British Empire (MBE) ====
Isle of Man

- Patricia Mary Costain. For Public Service and to Charity on the Isle of Man.
- Howard Lindsay Gordon Parkin. For services to the Understanding of Astronomy and to the Manx Community

Jersey

- Steven Timothy Cartwright, Chief Officer, Bailiff’s Office. For services to the Community.
- Ruth Ann Smith. For services to the communities in Jersey and Kenya

=== British Empire Medal (BEM) ===
Isle of Man

- Gillian Rosemary Cowley. For voluntary services to the Royal National Lifeboat Institute on the Isle of Man.

Guernsey

- Michael Chapple. For services to Youth Sailing in Guernsey.

Jersey

- Jeannine Aline Carey. For services to the Disabled in Jersey.

== The Bahamas ==
Below are the individuals appointed by Charles III in his right as King of The Bahamas, on advice of His Majesty's Bahamas Ministers.

=== The Most Excellent Order of the British Empire ===
==== Officer of the Order of the British Empire (OBE) ====
- Demetrious George Mosko. For services to the Business Sector.

==== Member of the Order of the British Empire (MBE) ====
- The Reverend Diana Eloise Francis. For services to Religion and Youth Work.
- Bishop Godfrey Randolph Williams. For services to Religion and Community Work.

=== British Empire Medal (BEM) ===
- Bishop Hensel Ruthnell Kemp. For services to Religion.
- Dr Inez Rolle. For services to Religion.

== Bermuda ==
His Majesty The King, Charles III, has recognised the following individuals in his annual 2025 New Year's Honours List:

=== Order of the British Empire ===
==== Commander of the Order of the British Empire (CBE) ====
- The Hon. Michael H. Dunkley CBE. For services to Bermuda.

=== King's Certificates and Badges of Honour ===
- Jennifer L. Phillips. For services to the arts in Bermuda.

== Grenada ==
Below are the individuals appointed by Charles III in his right as King of Grenada, on advice of His Majesty's Grenada Ministers:

=== The Most Excellent Order of the British Empire ===
==== Officer of the Order of the British Empire (OBE) ====
- Ruth Elizabeth Rouse. For contributions to Public Service.
- Teddy Ronald St. Louis. For Public Service and to the Legal Profession.

==== Member of the Order of the British Empire (MBE) ====
- Mc Donald Anthony Beresford Cadore. For services to Education.
- Annie Lauretta Rush-Bain. For services to the Community.
- Keith Emmanuel Richard Williams. For services to Culture.

=== British Empire Medal (BEM) ===
- Barbara Ann Fraser-Buckmire. For services to Sports Administration.
- Lyneth Ann Edwards. For services to Culture.
- Cecil Gittens. For services to Policing.
- Marica Sonia Jones. For services to Nursing.

== Papua New Guinea ==
Below are the individuals appointed by Charles III in his right as King of Papua New Guinea, on advice of His Majesty's Papua New Guinea Ministers:

=== Order of Saint Michael and Saint George ===
==== Companion of the Order of St Michael and St George (CMG) ====
- The Honourable Soroi Eoe. For Political and Public Service.
- The Honourable Pila Niningi. For Political Service and to the Legal Profession in Papua New Guinea.

=== The Most Excellent Order of the British Empire ===
==== Knight / Dame Commander of the Order of the British Empire (KBE / DBE) ====
- Maria Lucia Kopkop OBE. For Public Service and to Education and to Women’s Rights.
- Yano Belo. For Political and Public Service.
- Sinai John Brown OBE. For Political and Public Service, and to the development of the East New Britain Province.
- Robert Igara CMG. For services to Higher Education and to the Community.

==== Officer of the Order of the British Empire (OBE) ====
- Donald Gire Lilo. For services to Agriculture and Political Service.
- Ponnusamy Manohar. For services to Tertiary Education.
- Dangang James Tapele. For services to Primary Education and Political Service in the East New Britain Province.
- Milfred Wangatau. For services to the Legal Profession.
- Elias Rahuromo Wohengu. For Public Service

==== Member of the Order of the British Empire (MBE) ====
===== Civil =====
- Rose Bolgy. For services to Education.
- Rottona Girana. For services to Education.
- John Waso Iso. For services to Education.
- Alice Joel. For services to Education.
- Philip Tiki. For services to Education, to Religion, to the Community and to Sport.
- Timothy James Ward, Jr. For Public Service.

===== Military =====
- Captain Thomas Ponjom, Papua New Guinea Defence Force.
- Captain Peter Tupma, Papua New Guinea Defence Force.

== Solomon Islands ==
Below are the individuals appointed by Charles III in his right as King of the Solomon Islands, on advice of His Majesty's Solomon Islands Ministers.

=== The Most Excellent Order of the British Empire ===
==== Commander of the Order of the British Empire (CBE) ====
- Danny Lam. For services to Commerce and Community Development.
- Matthew Cooper Wale. For Political and Public Service.

==== Officer of the Order of the British Empire (OBE) ====
- Mostyn Mangau BEM. For services to the Royal Solomon Islands Police Force and National Security.

==== Member of the Order of the British Empire (MBE) ====
- Heath Davies. For services to the Royal Solomon Islands Police Force.
- Simpson Pogeava. For services to the Royal Solomon Islands Police Force.
- Ian Vaevaso KPM. For services to the Royal Solomon Islands Police Force.

=== King's Police Medal (KPM) ===
- William Samuel Foufaka. Superintendent, Royal Solomon Islands Police Force.
- Jimson Robo. Chief Superintendent, Royal Solomon Islands Police Force.

== Saint Lucia ==
Below are the individuals appointed by Charles III in his right as King of the Saint Lucia, on advice of His Majesty's Saint Lucia Ministers:

=== Order of Saint Michael and Saint George ===
==== Knight Commander of the Order of St Michael and St George (KCMG) ====
- Llewellyn Xavier, O.B.E. For services to Community Infrastructure and Development.

== Belize ==
Below are the individuals appointed by Charles III in his right as King of Belize, on advice of His Majesty's Belize Ministers.

=== The Most Excellent Order of the British Empire ===
==== Officer of the Order of the British Empire (OBE) ====
- Phillippa Noreen Fairweather. For Public Service and to the Community.

==== Member of the Order of the British Empire (MBE) ====
- Lucilo Enrique Alcoser. For services to the Community.
- Gregoria Aragon. For services to the Community.
- Dr. Marcelino Avila. For Public Service.
- Rudolph Bernard Coye. For services to the Tourism Industry.

== Antigua and Barbuda ==
Below are the individuals appointed by Charles III in his right as King of Antigua and Barbuda, on advice of His Majesty's Antigua and Barbuda Ministers.

=== Order of Saint Michael and Saint George ===
==== Knight Commander of the Order of St Michael and St George (KCMG) ====
- Aziz Fares Hadeed, C.B.E. For services to the Economy and Social Development.

=== King's Police Medal (KPM) ===
- Everton Glenroy Jeffers, Deputy Commissioner of Police, Royal Police Force of Antigua and Barbuda

== Saint Christopher and Nevis ==
Below are the individuals appointed by Charles III in his right as King of Saint Christopher and Nevis, on advice of His Majesty's St Kitts and Nevis Ministers.

== Decorations conferred by foreign nations ==
=== United States of America ===
==== Legion of Merit ====
Ribbon bar of the Legion of Merit (Officer)

===== Officer of the Legion of Merit =====
- Brigadier Richard Stuart Charles Bell, 549232.
- Brigadier Karl Ryan Harris, CBE, 541614.
- Major General Ewen Alexander Murchinson, DSO, MBE, N028343Q.

=== France ===
==== National Defence Medal ====
Ribbon bar of the National Defence Medal (Gold)

Ribbon bar of the National Defence Medal (Silver)

Ribbon bar of the National Defence Medal (Bronze)

===== Gold with bronze star and citation in the order of the air wing =====
- Squadron Leader Alexander Henry Lock, Royal Air Force, F8704224.

===== Silver =====
- Colonel Carsten Duke, Intelligence Corps, 555128.

===== Bronze =====
- Major Matthew Alexander Boomer, The Royal Logistic Corps, 562721.
