= Sophie Quinney =

Medical doctor

- Education: University of London (MB BS)
- Occupation: Clinical Director of the Welsh Gender Service

Sophie Quinney is the Clinical Director of the Welsh Gender Service and a general practitioner who has a special interest in transgender healthcare.

== Early life and education ==
Quinney studied at University of London, obtaining her MB BS in 2000. She previously served as the associate medical director for the Welsh Commissioner. Quinney has previously worked as a GP for Meddygfa Canna Surgery in Cardiff.

== Career ==
In June 2015, Quinney joined the GP Register and began working as a locum GP across South Wales. She became the Welsh representative of GP Survival, an organisation advocating for GPs struggling with large work loads. As the Welsh representative she ran a month long weekly volunteer clinic at Horeb Surgery in Treorchy in July 2016, to support the sole GP in charge of the practice. The practice intended to close at the end of July, leaving over 3,000 registered patients without a local GP.

Quinney warned that closures were the result of GPs struggling throughout Wales due to a lack of GPs who were over worked and struggling with high levels of stress. She has also called for the Welsh Government to cover insurance costs for doctors who are working out of hours, something that can cost more to £15,000 if the doctor works out of hours full-time. In 2017, she encouraged GPs to explain to patients the issues their practises were facing around staffing shortages. Doing so, she said, would make patients more supportive.

In 2018 Quinney worked at the Cardiff Health Access Practice, a service run by the Cardiff and the Vale University Health Board to provide health screenings for asylum seekers arriving in Wales.

Throughout her career Quinney has been supportive of transgender healthcare in Wales, specialising in gender identity medicine, becoming the first doctor to do so within Wales. She worked with Pride Cymru in 2020, running a transgender healthcare Q&A. She has released guidance on how doctors can treat transgender patients with dignity, and in 2022 advised the Welsh Government for the LGBTQ+ Action Plan for Wales.

== Welsh Gender Service ==
The Welsh Gender Service was initially announced by Vaughan Gething in 2017. Following multiple delays it was opened in September 2019, in St David's Hospital, Cardiff. As part of the preparations for the Welsh Gender Service's expected opening, Quinney trained fellow consultants, allowing them to work as part of a local gender team. Following the services opening, Quinney joined as a Gender Specialist. She later became the Clinical Director.
