= Kate Nambiar =

English doctor

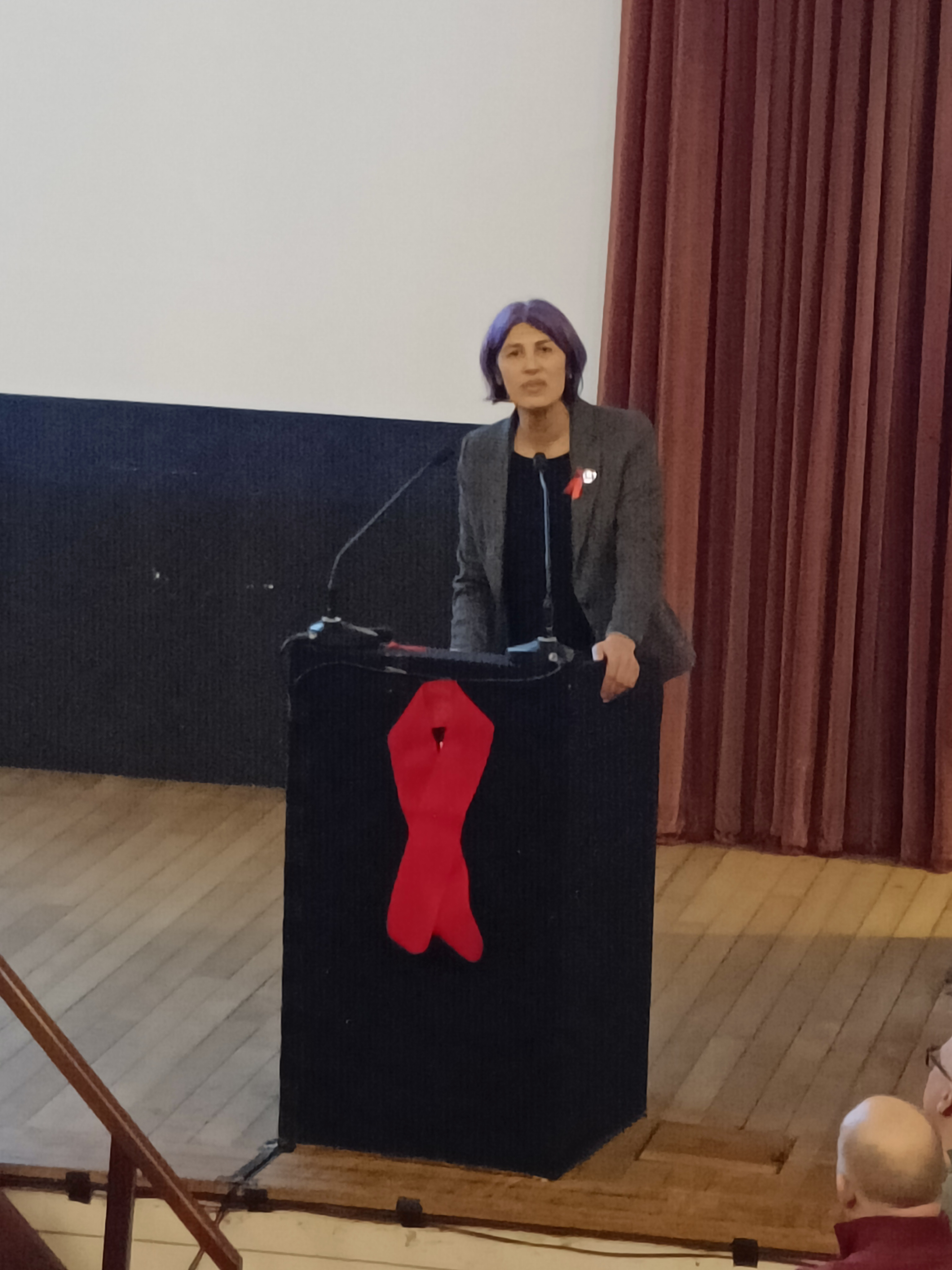
- Nambiar in 2024
- Education: Oriel College, Oxford
- Occupation: Gender specialist for the Welsh Gender Service
- Known for: Transgender and sexual health activism

Kate Nambiar is an English doctor who specialises in sexual health and gender identity medicine. In 2012 she was one of the co-founders of Clinic T in Brighton, England. Nambiar currently works for the Welsh Gender Service, as a gender specialist and endocrinologist. She was previously the medical director of the Terrence Higgins Trust.

== Early life and education ==
Nambiar is of Chinese-Indian heritage. She studied Medicine & Physiological Sciences at Oriel College, Oxford, graduating in 1996. She began her gender transition as a student, and found that her peers were unsupportive. Nambiar has spoken openly about how she struggled to find a community and acceptance during the 1990s. After graduating, she moved to London to begin her clinical training. Nambiar began working in the NHS in 1999 and completed her PhD in immunology and bioinformatics at Brighton and Sussex Medical School. In 2003, she specialised in HIV and sexual health.

== Medical career ==
=== Clinic T ===
In 2012, Nambiar co-founded Clinic T, a monthly sexual health clinic, geared towards transgender people in Brighton. It was established in partnership with the Terrence Higgins Trust, and Brighton LGBT Health Inclusion Project, as part of a local health study. Nambiar explained that she advocated for the clinic while working in Brighton's Sexual Health and Contraception Service, after transgender and nonbinary people shared that they felt there were no sexual health services that supported their needs. In 2016 she was part of a team that shared the findings of a satisfaction survey that Clinic T had given to patients. The evaluation found that patients were largely happy with their care, and that the clinic helped meet the broader health needs of transgender patients.

Reflecting on the experience, Nambiar admitted she previously had "internalised feelings of transphobia" around her gender identity and that working in Clinic T helped her to reconnect with the transgender community. While there, Nambiar noticed the demand for gender identity clinicians, and in 2019 underwent training at the Tavistock and Portman Gender Identity Clinic. Her work continued at Clinic T during this time, with Nambiar splitting her hours across the two services.

=== Further work ===
Nambiar has worked as a speciality doctor in Sexual Health and HIV at University Hospitals Sussex NHS Foundation Trust and has previously served as the chair of the BASHH's (British Association for Sexual Health and HIV) Gender and Sexual Minorities Specialist Interest Group. She was also part of a team at Brighton and Sussex University Hospitals that published guidance around gender inclusive language within perinatal care in 2021. Throughout her work, she has advocated for transgender men to have better access to cervical screening by contributing to research and participating in a 2019 Fox Fisher video, where she performed a cervical screening exam on him.

In 2022, she moved to Cardiff, and now works as a gender clinician and endocrinology specialist at the Welsh Gender Service. She was the medical director of the Terrence Higgins Trust between September 2022 and January 2025. Nambiar is a member of the HIV Action Plan Task and Finish Group in Wales, contributing to the HIV Action Plan for Wales 2023-26. In December 2022, she joined the Working Group on Banning Conversion Practices, set up by the Welsh Government following the publication of the LGBTQ+ Action Plan for Wales.

Nambiar was listed as "One to watch" on Wales Online's 2022 Pinc List of most influential LGBT+ people in Wales. She went on to make the full list in 2023 and 2024. The EastEnders team worked with Nambiar and the Terrence Higgins Trust in 2023, to produce a storyline around one of the show's established characters being diagnosed with HIV. Nambiar provided advice around the medical aspects of HIV, including the diagnosis, and what treatment options may be considered. The Terrence Higgins Trust experienced a 75% increase in website traffic in the month after the storyline began. In February 2025, Nambiar was listed on Attitude magazine's 101 STEM list, dedicated to influential LGBTQ+ people working within STEM.
