= Llandough, Penarth =

Llandough: Welsh: Llandochau Fach
- Village
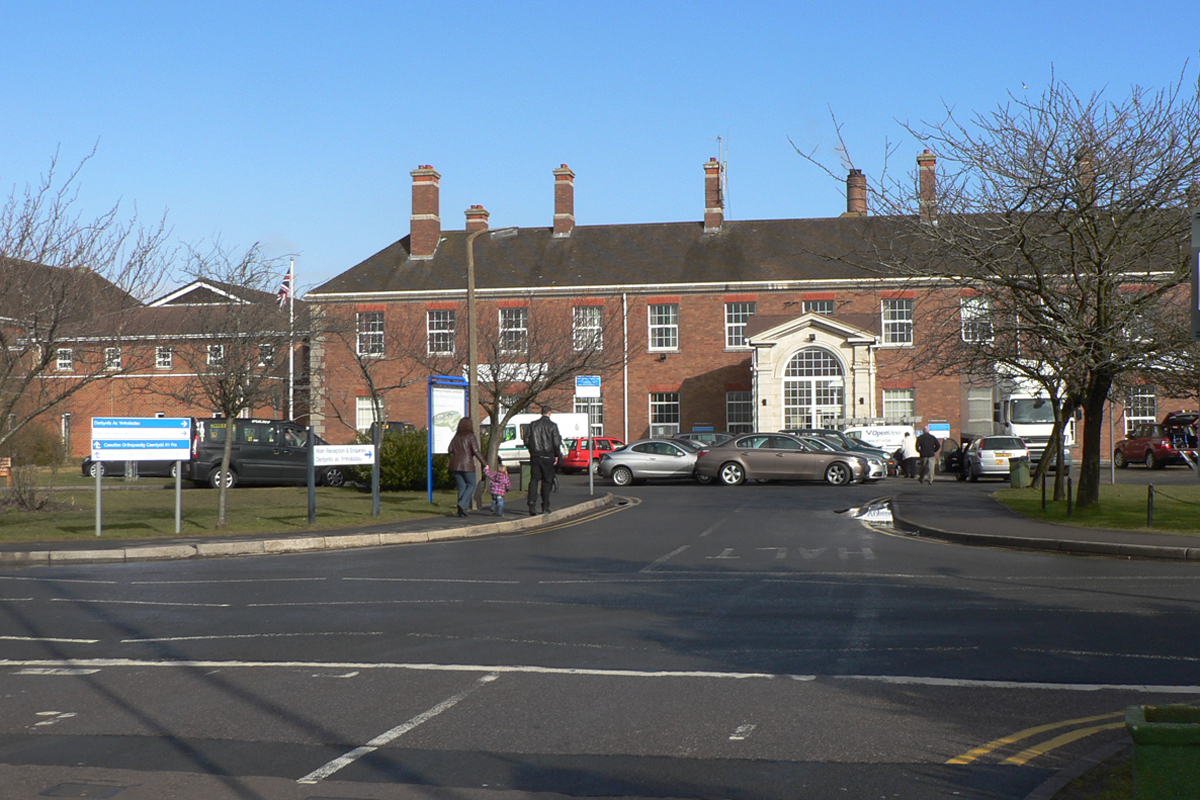

- Location within the Vale of Glamorgan
- Area: 1.6176 km^{2} (0.6246 sq mi)
- Population: 1,977 (2011)
  - Density: 1,222/km^{2} (3,160/sq mi)
- OS grid reference: ST1685372975
- Community: Penarth
- Principal area: Vale of Glamorgan
- Preserved county: South Glamorgan
- Country: Wales
- Sovereign state: United Kingdom
- Post town: Penarth
- Postcode district: CF64
- Police: South Wales
- Fire: South Wales
- Ambulance: Welsh
- UK Parliament: Cardiff South and Penarth
- Senedd Cymru – Welsh Parliament: Caerdydd Penarth
- List of places UK Wales Vale of Glamorgan 51.449167°N 3.196667°W Map of the community

Llandough (/lænˈdɒk/; Welsh: Llandochau Fach [ɬan'doːχaɨ vaχ]) is a village, community and electoral ward in the Vale of Glamorgan, Wales, approximately 2.3 miles (3.7 km) south west of Cardiff city centre, and approximately 1.3 miles (2 km) north west of Penarth.

== Toponymy ==
Llandough is an anglicisation of the Welsh placename Llandochau Fach, which as a combination of the words llan (meaning 'church') and Dochau (Saint Dochau/Dochdwy), followed by bach (meaning 'small', however, consonant mutation in Welsh means this is changed to fach).

== History ==
Excavations have shown that the village's history goes back to the Roman occupation of Wales.

Until the mid-1960s, Llandough was a small farming and quarrying village but experienced an expansion involving the building of a large number of houses, a primary school, and a block of six shopping units. These shops have since been demolished.

There were around six thatched cottages in the village around 1960, but only one now remains – Pound Cottage.

Llandough became a separate community from Penarth in 1982, though its residents retained a right to be buried in Penarth Cemetery at the same cost until 2007.

== Buildings ==
=== St Dochdwy's Church ===
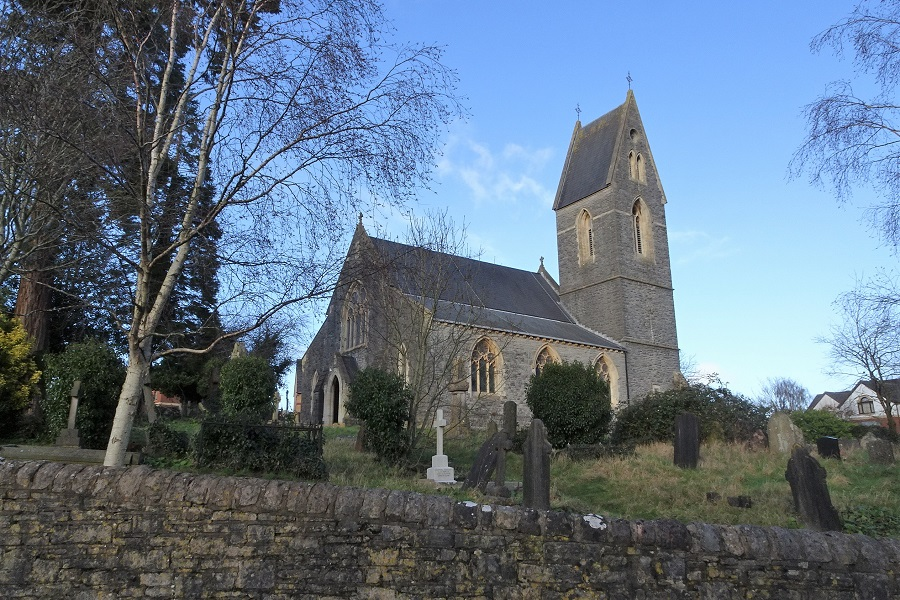
St Dochdwy's Church

Llandough was long believed to be one of the main ecclesiastical centres in south east Wales, and was the site of a monastic community known as Bangor Dochau, by St Dochau in the 5th century. Evidence to support this claim was found when the excavations of the Roman villa revealed post-Roman burials, and by another excavation in 1994, when the remains of over 800 individual burials dating from the 4th century to the 12th century AD were revealed.

The monastery became defunct in around the early 11th century, however the site continued in use as a parish church.

The first permanent church building was built in the 12th century, was restored in the 18th century, and remained in use until 1820. The original church was replaced in the 19th century by the Llandaff diocesan architects, Prichard and Seddon. However, this church was deemed too small for the growing population of the village and was replaced after 40 years of service by the current church. The first for the 19th century churches was dismantled and re-erected at Leckwith, where it was re-dedicated to St James. The building has since been converted into a pair of houses.

The current church was built in 1866. It was designed by architect Samuel Charles Fripp of Bristol, and built by David Jones of Penarth for a cost of £2,600.

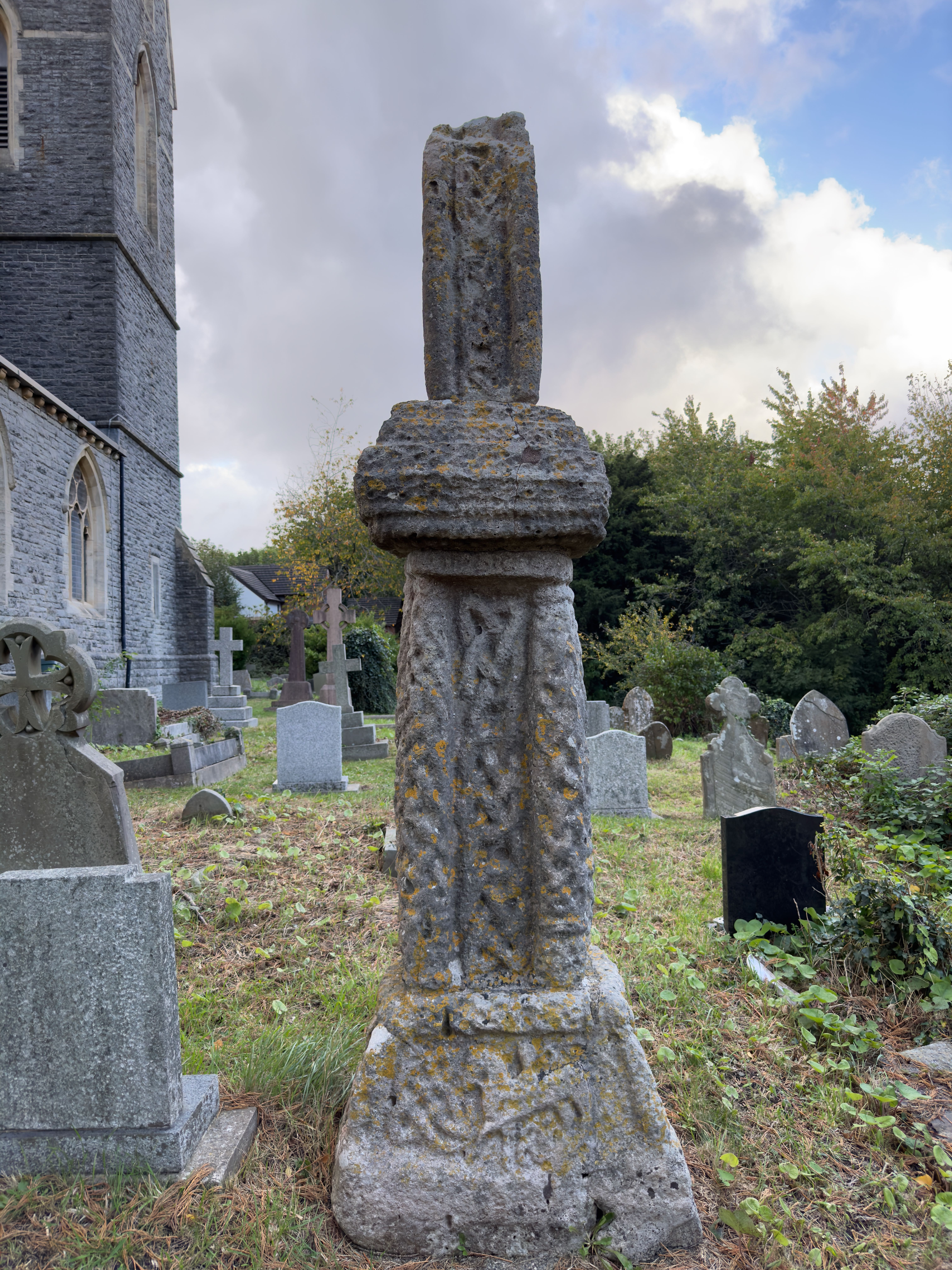
Irbic Cross

A Celtic stone cross dating back to the 10th or 11th century still stands in the churchyard today. The stone includes an inscription IRBICI, which means “[the stone] of Irbic”, but nothing is known of this person or exactly why the cross was erected. The cross has been mutilated at the top but otherwise is complete. The monument is made of Sutton stone and measures 9 feet 9 inches (3.0 m) by 2 feet 3 inches (0.7 m). Renovation work was carried out on the cross in July 2013. A replica can be seen at National Museum Cardiff.

To the west of the church are three fragmentary components of a well-fortified house dating from the 1420s or 1430s, believed to have been built by John de Van.

=== Great House Farm ===
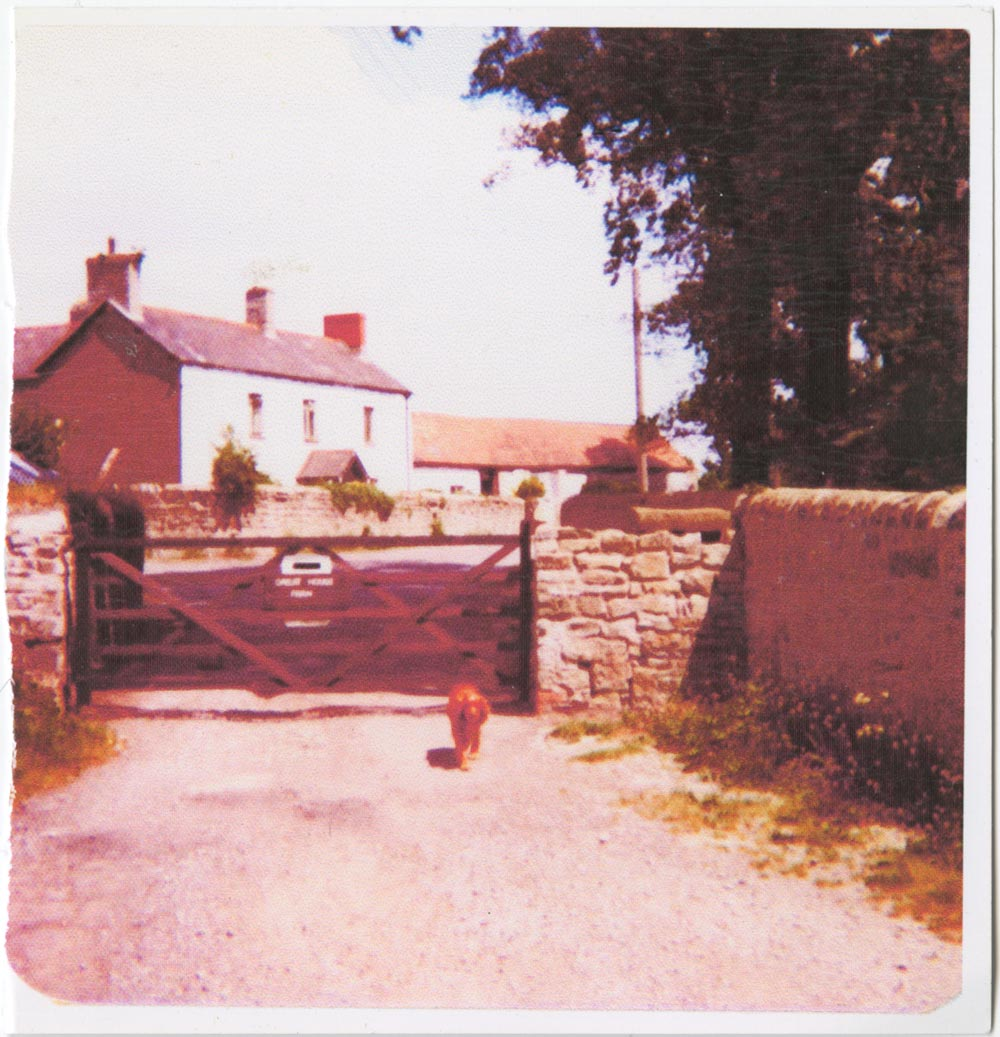
Great Farm House, before its demolition

Great House Farm stood alongside St Dochdwy's church, and was the site of a Celtic monastery and a missionary centre.

The remains of a soldier and his horse were found under the floor of the dining room when the stone floor was replaced with timber. It is thought that there was a battle on the site and the soldier was buried where he lay in his armour. His remains were re-buried in St Dochdwy's churchyard and his visor and lance are now in Amgueddfa Cymru – Museum Wales. A petition for the preservation of the farm was signed by 1,700 people in 1974.

The farm was opened on occasions for locals, schoolchildren, and visitors to learn about how people lived in the past. A cheese drying room was hollowed out of a solid wall. There was a bedroom where travelling monks would have taken their rest. Guglielmo Marconi slept here in 1897 while working on his wireless telegraphy experiments between Lavernock Point and Flat Holm.

The farm was demolished in 1988, following a 33-year dispute over ownership. The site is now mostly vacant and overgrown, awaiting housing development. Housing was built on what was once the fields of Great House Farm in the 1960s, as well as the current Llandough primary school, which was opened in 1970 by James Callaghan, a local MP.

=== Roman villa ===
The site of a Roman villa was uncovered in 1979 when the housing association began work for blocks of flats. The Glamorgan and Gwent Archaeological Trust started excavation with the help of volunteers. There were indications that the villa stood between the second half of the 2nd century and the middle of the 4th century. It was built of mortar with roofs of red pottery tiles and Pennant sandstone. The walls were rendered with plaster, and the floors made of bricks and crushed tiles. A well-preserved sunken bath was found in the main living quarters.

A skeleton, skull and bones were found on the site, remains of a Romano-British family, possibly farmers.

A last-minute bid to save the site of the villa was unsuccessful and the flats of Corinthian Close and Tuscan Close were built on it.

=== Baron's Court ===
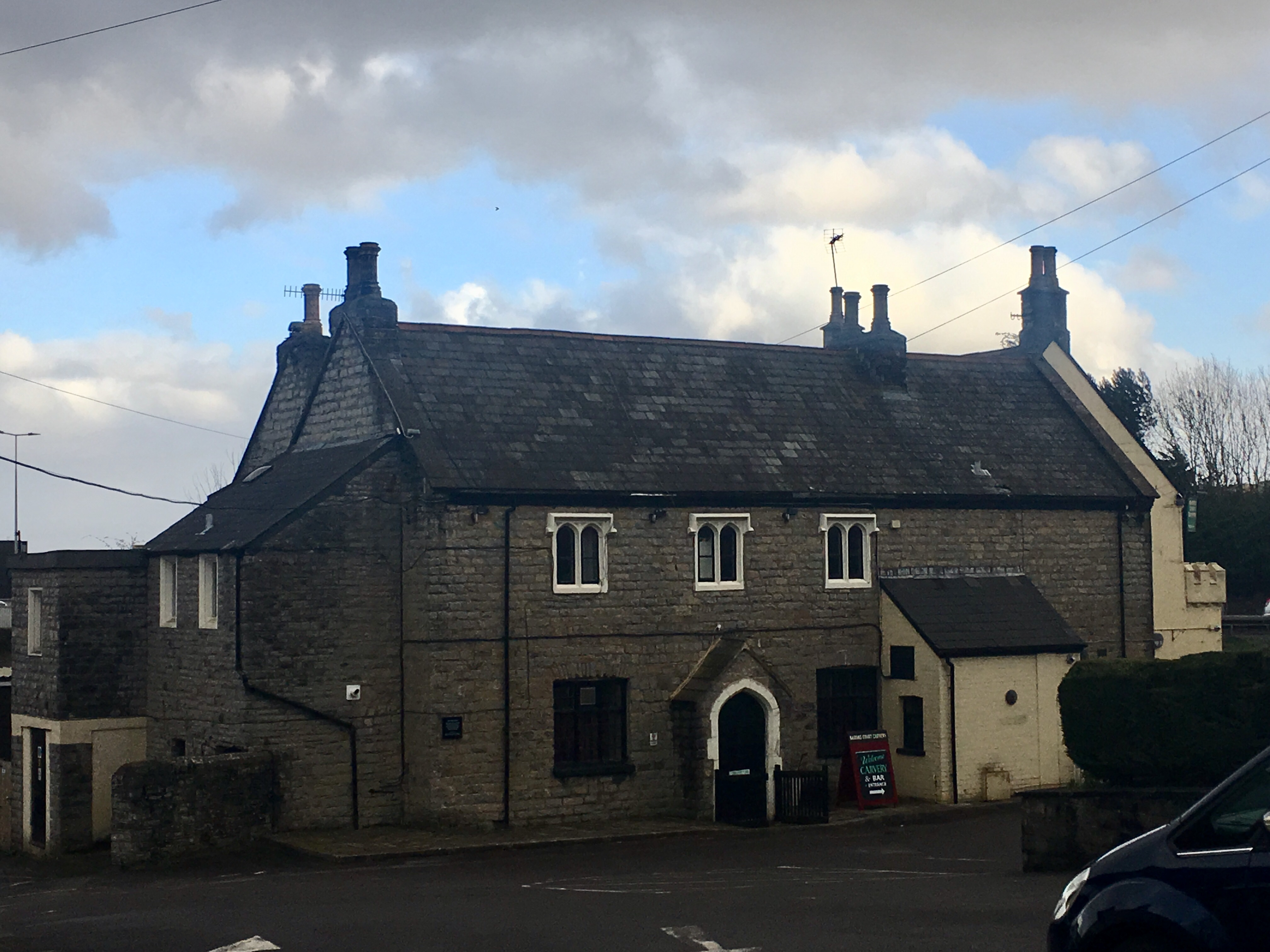
Barons Court

Baron's Court, originally known as Cogan Pill, is a late 15th or early 16th-century hall house with 19th-century additions.

It was built for Sir Mathew Cradock (died 1531) and passed his grandson Sir George Herbert, the first Sherif of Glamorgan (1494 to 1543). His younger son William, who was sheriff in 1552 and 1567 reputedly enlarged the house. It remained in the Herbert family, who also held St Fagans Castle, for many generations, becoming a farmhouse in 1642 with the grand hall converted to a barn. In 1790 the building was purchased by Lord Bute. Restored and remodelled c 1850 by H S Corbett, relative and agent of the Marquess of Bute, as a house for himself.

Many of the current features of the building date from this restoration, but it is the only surviving medieval hall building in South Wales still open from floor to roof.

It has since been a Toby Carvery chain restaurant, and is now a pub/restaurant.

=== Llandough Institute ===
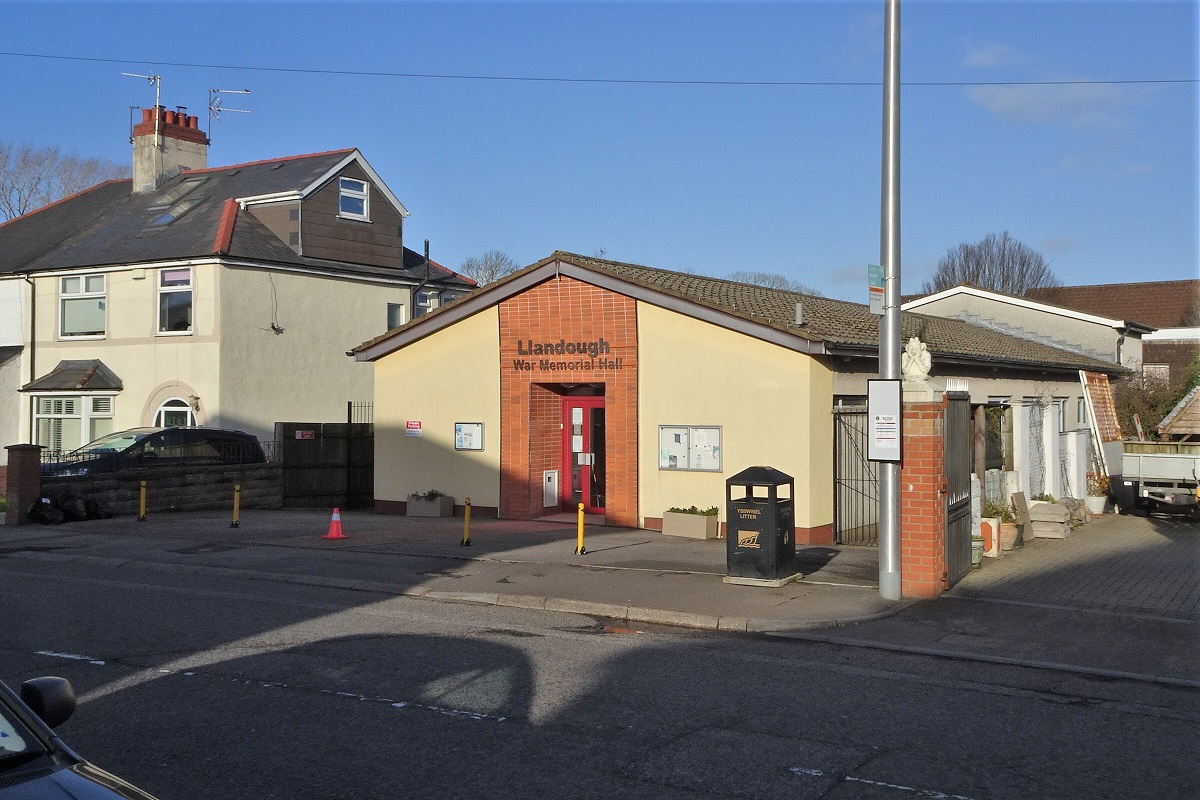
Llandough War Memorial Hall

The Llandough and Leckwith War Memorial Institute was opened by the Marchioness of Bute in 1924. It was built using donations from families from the two villages. The original hall was replaced 50 years later and formally opened by Sir Cennydd Traherne. Both the original and the current halls have been used for village functions, except during the World War II years when the building was used by the Royal Air Force. An anti-aircraft battery and balloon barrage unit were also situated in the village, and smoke screen motors were often used to throw smoke screens over Cardiff.

=== Rose Cottage ===
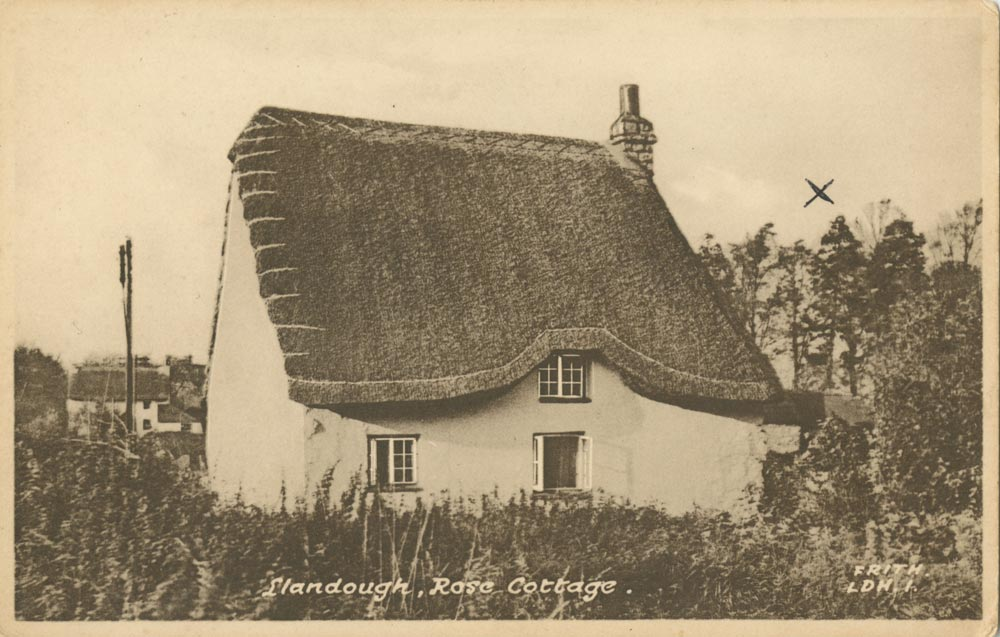
Old postcard of Rose Cottage

The Baptist congregation of Llandough originally met in Rose Cottage, opposite Lewis Road on Penlan Road. The cottage was derelict by 1963, and has been demolished. The original garden walls still exist in front of the flats built on the site.

=== Llandough Baptist Church ===
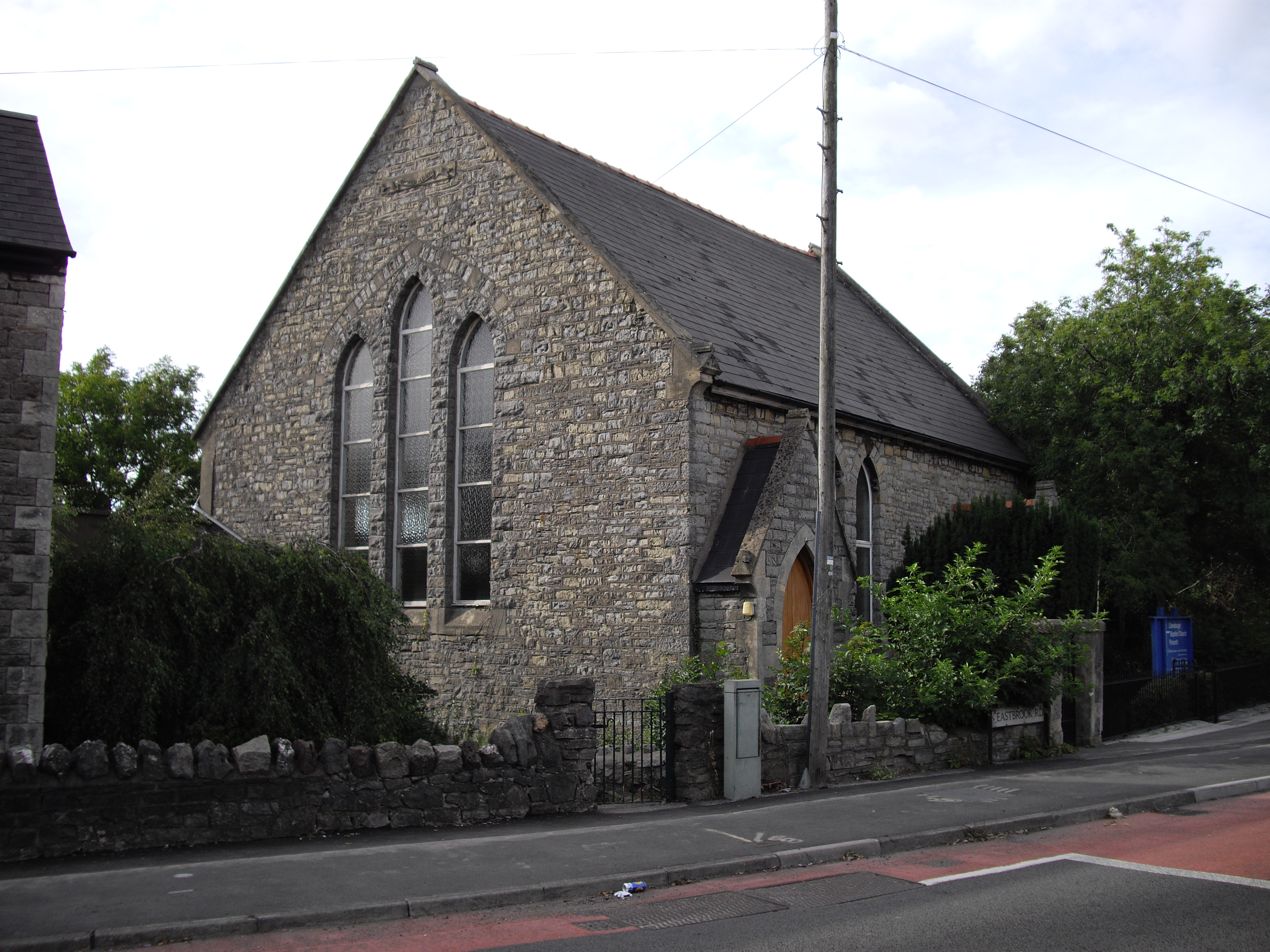
Llandough Baptist Church

Built in 1859 as the successor to the Rose Cottage meeting house, the main building was constructed of stone from Llandough quarry with a slate roof. There was no interior ceiling. A number of extensions and modernisations were made after 1979.

=== Lewis Road terraces ===
Numbers 1, 3, 5 and 7 Lewis Road were built around 1830. The terraced houses were constructed from square cornered limestone, with slate roofs, and store forecourt walls. Originally the windows and doors had flat arches but some of these features have been removed through modernisation.

Between 1830 and 1971, 1 Lewis Road has operated as a village shop, a bakery, a post office, and a grocers.

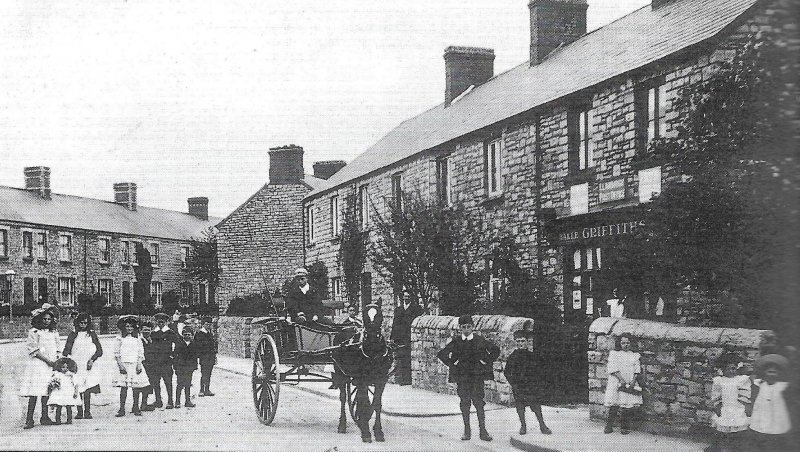
A 1908 postcard of Llandough Post Office on Lewis Road

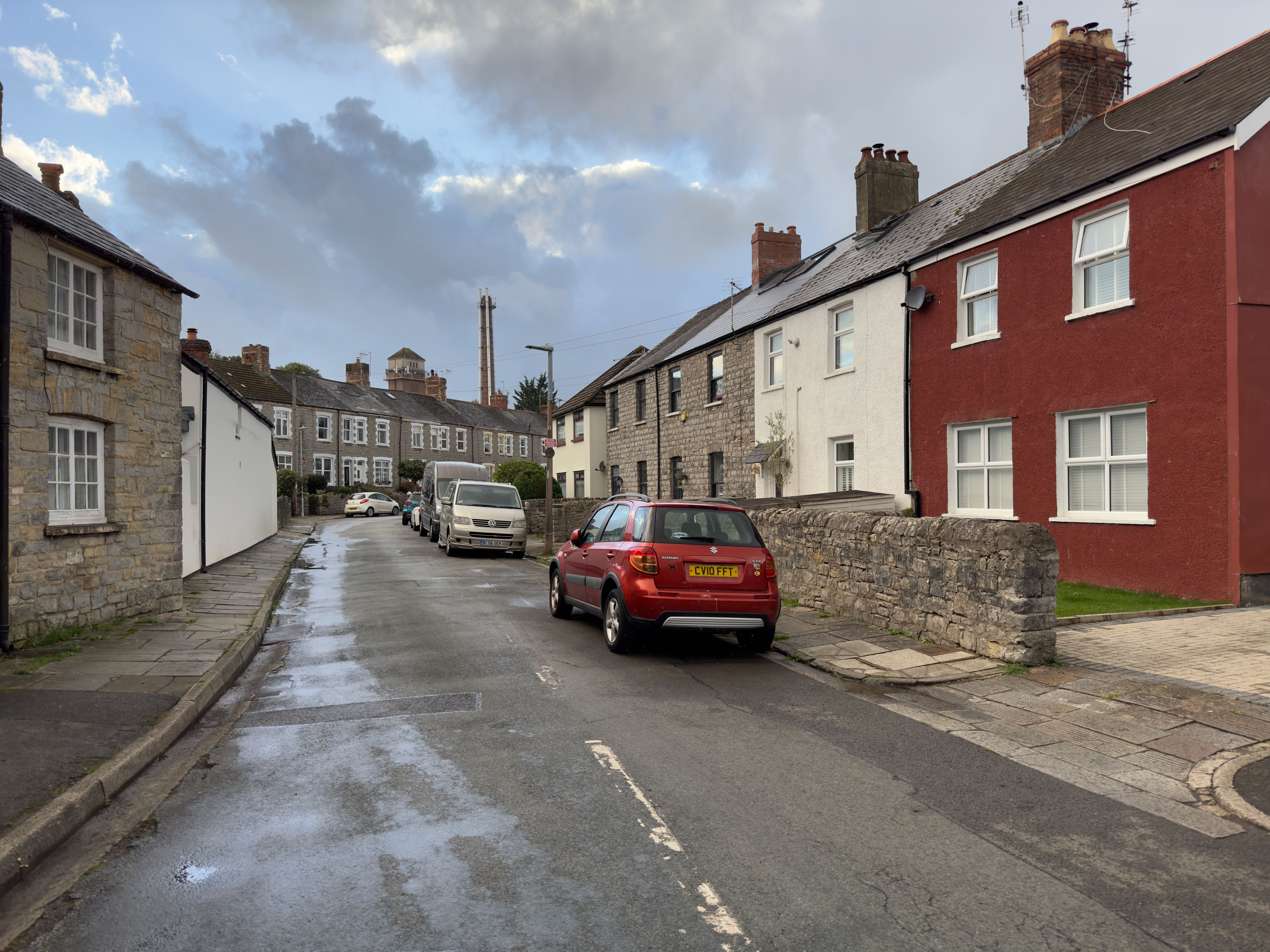
Lewis Road

=== The Blacksmith's Cottage ===
The Blacksmith's Cottage, now 89 Penlan Road, is a single-storey stone building dating from around 1760. It originally had a thatched roof which has been replaced by a tiled roof. The current kitchen area incorporates the blacksmith's oven, in the form of a brick dome.

=== The National School ===
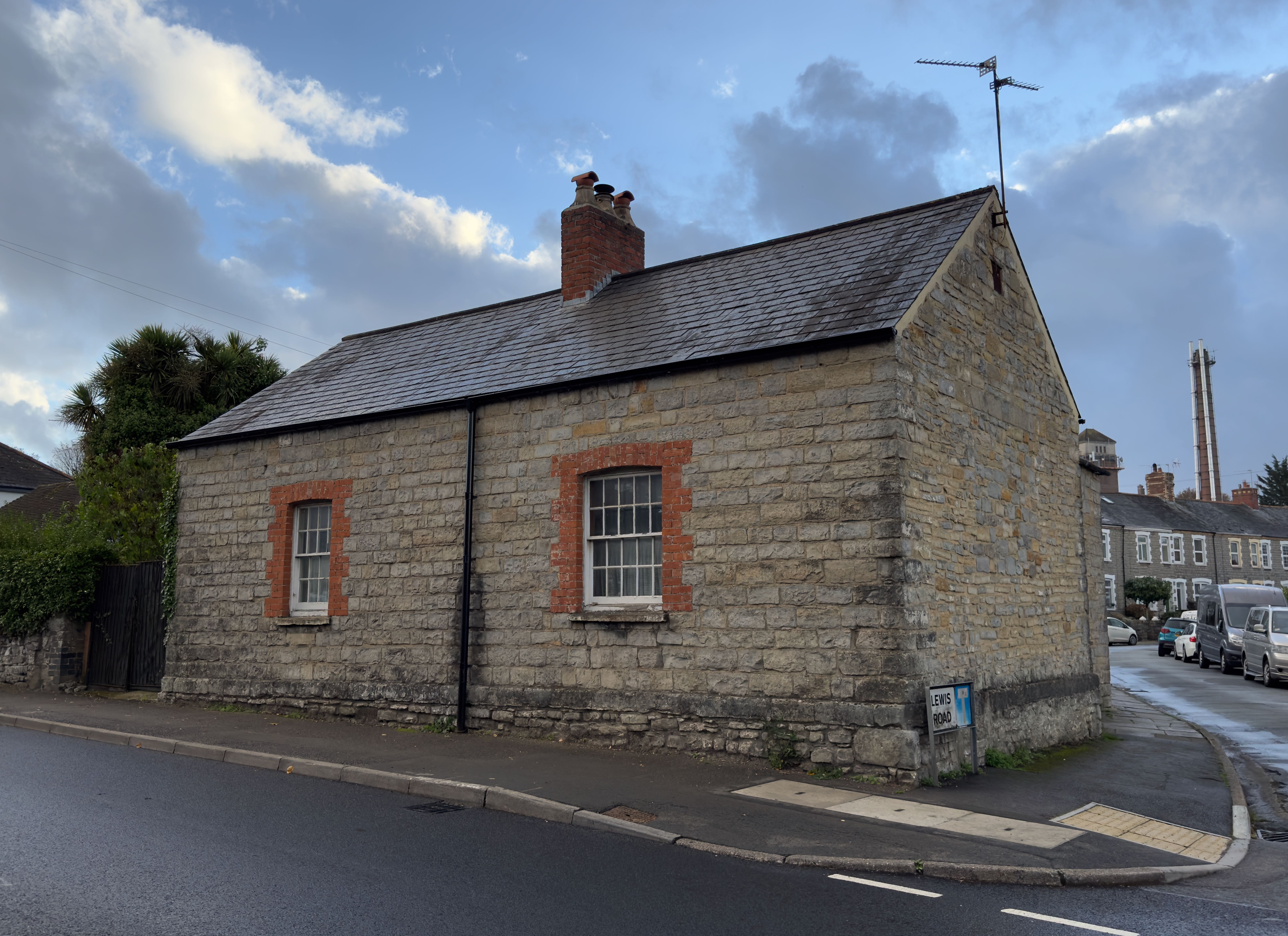
The National School

The stone building on the corner of Penlan Road and Lewis Road was the first National School in the Penarth area, dating from 1825. It was the initiative of the rector, Rev. James Evans, and was supported by the 2nd Marquess of Bute. At that time the population of Llandough was around 200, and the majority had Welsh as their first language.

The school building was constructed in stone with a slate roof and brick-edged windows and was planned to accommodate between 50 and 60 children. Behind the school a smaller house was constructed as the residence of the school teacher.

By 1870 the village's population had increased to over 700, and in 1872 the school was replaced by a new building opposite. The new school was planned to accommodate around 125 children and served as an elementary school until January 1941, when it was badly damaged by bombing during World War II.

The national school building is now a private house.

=== Pen-Y-Lan House ===
Pen-Y-Lan House, now 91 Penlan Road, was built in 1680 and is one of the oldest houses in the village. Originally the house was a one-up, one-down, but it has been extended to the rear and now has three bedrooms. The house is built of stone and originally had a thatched roof, which has been replaced by slate.

=== The Policeman's House and Old Post Office ===
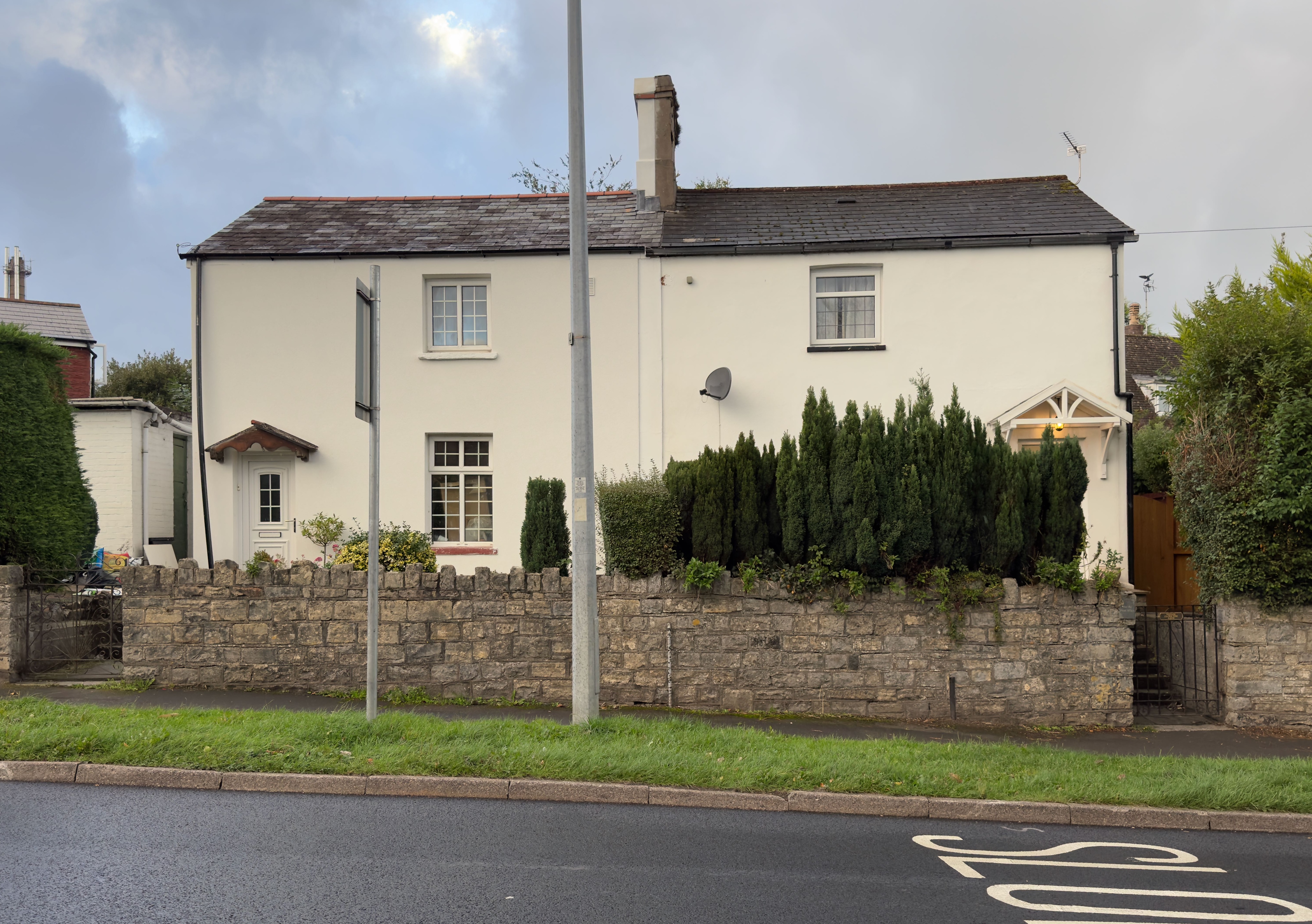
18 and 20 Penlan Road

Number 18 and 20 Penlan Road were built between 1840 and 1874 in stonework with slate roofs.

Number 20 was the village's police station until around 1954. Its garage incorporated the Air Raid Precautions post during World War II.

Number 18 was the original Post Office for Llandough.

=== Pound Cottage ===
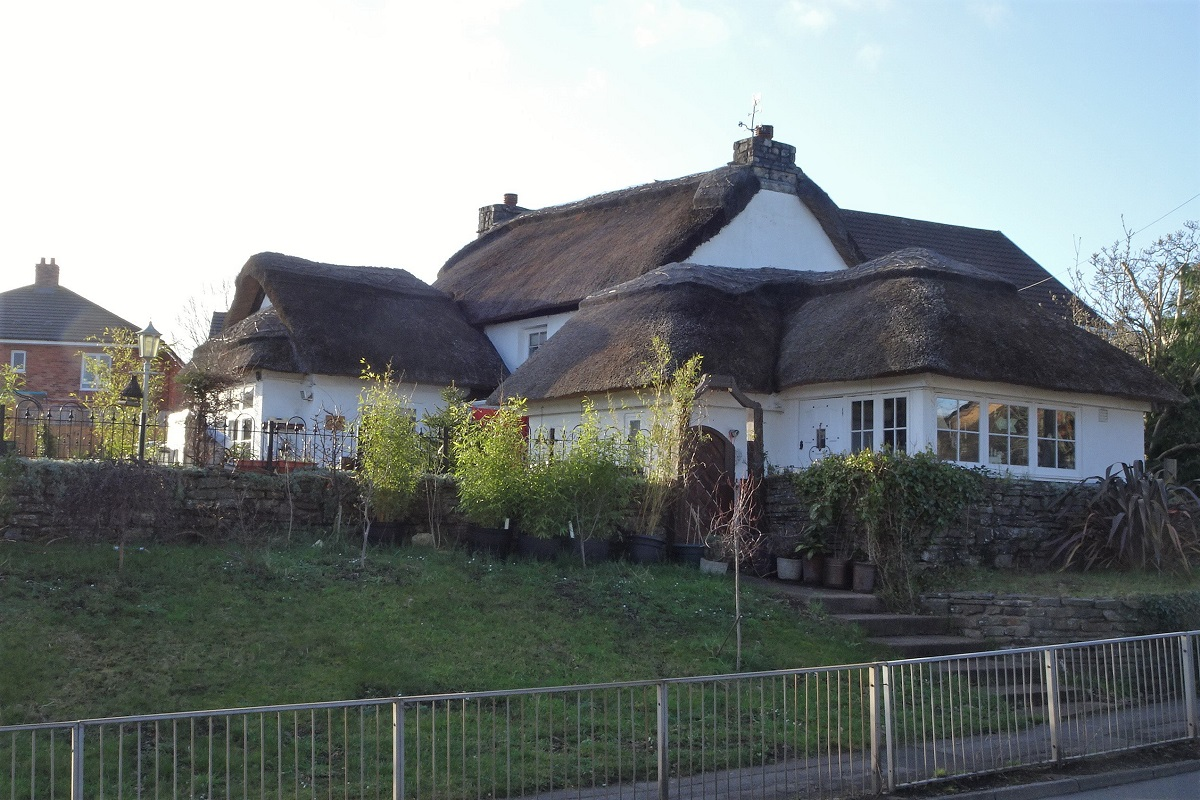
Pound Cottage

Pound Cottage is a grade II listed building and was constructed around 1830 on land belonging to the Bute estate. It is as a two-storey thatched cottage with whitewashed walls. It was formerly the home of the village pound keeper, who was responsible for catching and keeping stray animals. The stone walled pound attached to the building was demolished in 1950.

There have been multiple alterations and additions, including single-storey extensions at each end, both of which are thatched. The cottage is now the last thatched cottage in Llandough.

Pound Cottage served as a sweetshop for some years.

=== Primrose Cottage ===
Primrose Cottage was built as three small cottages called Primrose, Moss Rose, and Rosemary in the period 1840–1878. Each cottage was a one-up, one-down with stone spiral staircases.

=== University Hospital Llandough ===
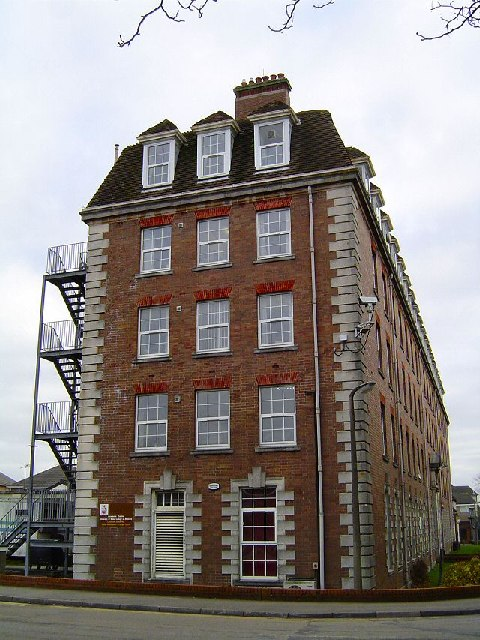
University Hospital Llandough

University Hospital Llandough is a district general hospital managed by the Cardiff and Vale University Health Board. It was opened in 1930 as Llandough Hospital and joined the National Health Service in 1948. It was renamed as 'University Hospital Llandough' in 2008 to reflect its links with the Cardiff University School of Medicine.

=== Y Bwthyn Bach ===
Also known as The Welsh House and The Little House, the house was constructed from materials left over from the construction of University Hospital Llandough. It was presented as a gift from the people of Wales to the Duke and Duchess of York (the future King George VI and Queen Elizabeth) in March 1932 for the 6th birthday of Princess Elizabeth (the future Queen Elizabeth II). It was transported to the royal family's house, Royal Lodge in Windsor Great Park near Windsor Castle, and has been used as a playhouse by children of the royal family ever since.

The house was designed by Cardiff architect Mr E C Morgan Willmott and had a thatched roof. The house is 24 by 8 feet (7.3 m × 2.4 m) with ceilings five feet (1.5 m) high, two-thirds the size of a normal house, and composed of a parlour, a kitchen, a bedroom, and a bathroom. The house is decorated throughout and has furniture and fittings to scale.

== Demography ==
The demographic figures date from the United Kingdom Census 2011 are as follows:

Usual resident population
	count	%
All usual residents	1,977	100.0
Males	968	49.0
Females	1,009	51.0
Lives in a household	1,950	98.6
Lives in a communal establishment	27	1.4
Schoolchild or full-time student aged 4 and over at their non term-time address	26	-
Area (Hectares)	161.76	-
Density (number of persons per hectare)	12.2	-

Age structure
	count	%
All usual residents	1,977	100
Age 0 to 4	103	5.2
Age 5 to 7	53	2.7
Age 8 to 9	37	1.9
Age 10 to 14	88	4.5
Age 15	26	1.3
Age 16 to 17	49	2.5
Age 18 to 19	28	1.4
Age 20 to 24	88	4.5
Age 25 to 29	82	4.1
Age 30 to 44	427	21.6
Age 45 to 59	433	21.9
Age 60 to 64	138	7.0
Age 65 to 74	246	12.4
Age 75 to 84	138	7.0
Age 85 to 89	27	1.4
Age 90 and over	14	0.7
Mean Age	43.8	-
Median Age	45	-

== Schools ==
Llandough currently has one primary school. All together there have been three. In the Victorian era, the school was situated on Penlan Road. Another school was later built, but was bombed in World War II. The current school was built in 1970. The school has approximately 180 pupils, and is one of the feeder schools for Penarth's largest secondary school, St. Cyres.

== Parks and recreation ==
=== King George V Playing Field ===
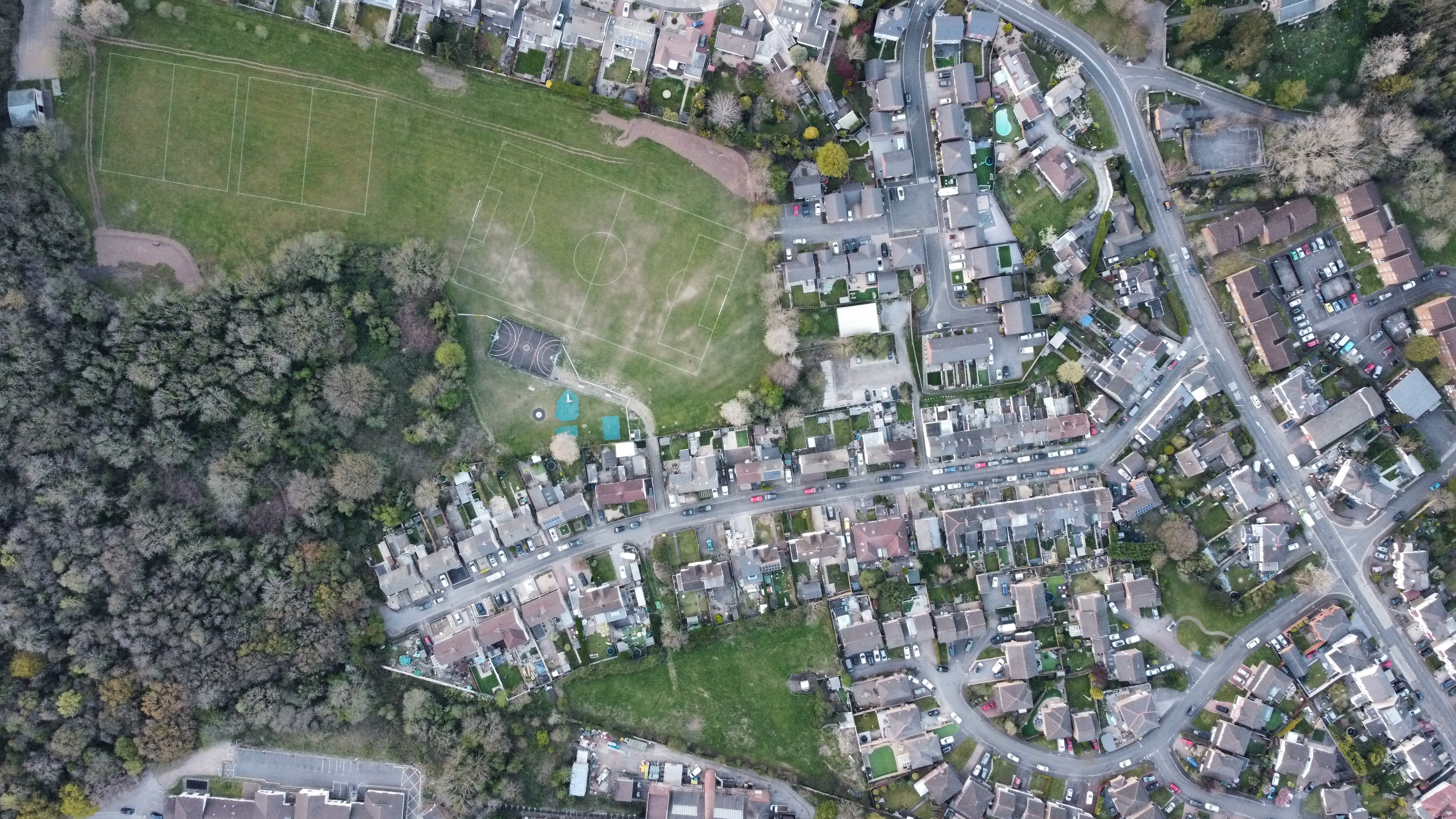
Aerial view of King George V playing field

King George V Playing Field is the main park and recreational area in Llandough. Situated between Lewis Road and Greenway Close it features a football pitch, a multi-use games area, a tennis court, an enclosed children's play area, and car parking.

The multi-use games area was constructed in 2020 and is suitable for a range of activities, including football and basketball. Funding came from the Vale Council's Strong Communities Grant Fund (£45,000), Section 106 contributions from nearby developments (£20,000) and a £20,000 Place for Sport grant from Sports Wales.

=== Pocket Parks and Village Green ===
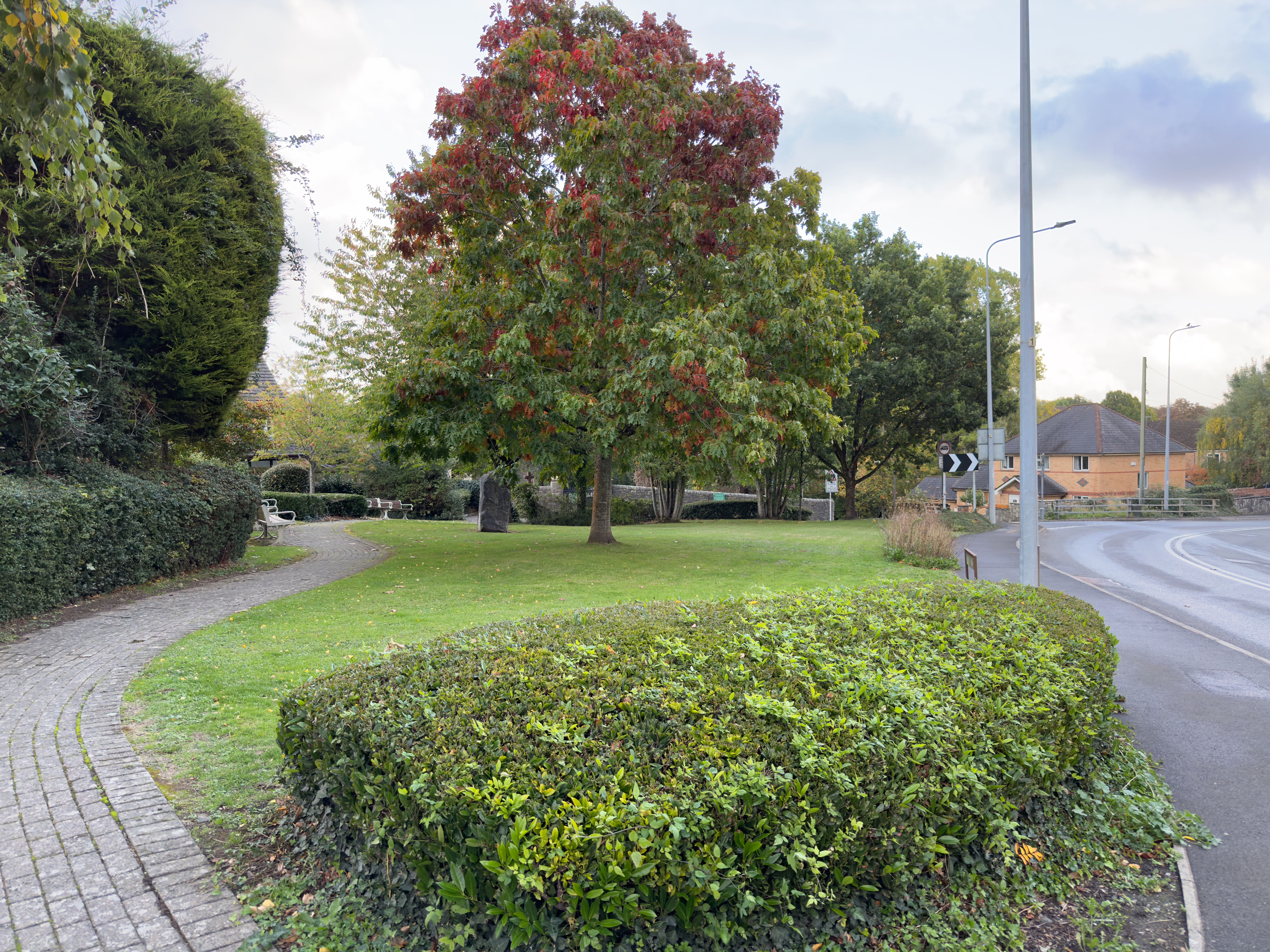
Village green

Llandough community council owns and maintains the village green, a village garden on Spencer Drive, and the Book Green pocket park near the junction of Llandough Hill and Penlan Road.

=== Allotment gardens ===
Llandough has a 67-plot allotment site on Corbett Road, which is managed by the community council.As of 2022, proposals for a new allotment site on Lewis Road are being discussed by the community council.

=== Health Meadow ===
Cardiff and Vale University Health Board has plans to develop field adjacent to University Hospital Llandough into an outdoor wellbeing and healthcare facility.

== Transport ==
=== Roads ===
The main road through the village is the B4267. From the junction on Llandough Hill to the Merrie Harrier junction on the A4055 (Barry Road) it is named Penlan Road, and from the Llandough Hill junction forwards it is named Leckwith Road. Llandough Hill connects the village to the A4160 (Penarth Road).

=== Buses ===
Llandough is served by 21 bus stops.

=== Train ===
The nearest train station to Llandough is Cogan Station approximately 0.4 miles (0.6 km) away. Services run to Aberdare, Barry Island, Bridgend, Merthyr Tydfil, and Pontypridd, with all services passing through Cardiff Central, operating at four trains per hour in each direction.

=== Bike ===
There is an OVO bikes (operated by Nextbike) hire station within the grounds of University Hospital Llandough offering electrically assisted bicycles.

== Governance ==
=== Community Council ===
The Community Council was established in 1982 and consists of 10 Councillors, a part-time Clerk and two part-time Caretakers.

The council manage Llandough's allotments site, the village fete, and community engagement.

The present chairman of the council (2022/23) is Cllr Lucy Barrowclough.

=== Vale of Glamorgan Council ===
Llandough's ward elects a county councillor to the Vale of Glamorgan Council.

The ward is currently represented by Cllr George Carroll (Conservatives).

=== Welsh Government ===
Vaughan Gething represents Cardiff South and Penarth in the Senedd (Labour & Co-operative Party), succeeding Lorraine Barrett.

Four other Members of the Senedd also represent the area: Joel James (Conservative), Andrew RT Davies (Conservative), Heledd Fychan (Plaid Cymru) and Rhys ab Owen (Plaid Cymru).

=== Westminster ===
The MP for Cardiff South and Penarth is Stephen Doughty (Labour & Co-operative Party) who was re-elected on 10 December 2019.

== Administrative boundary ==
The map below shows the administrative boundary of Llandough.

== Gallery ==
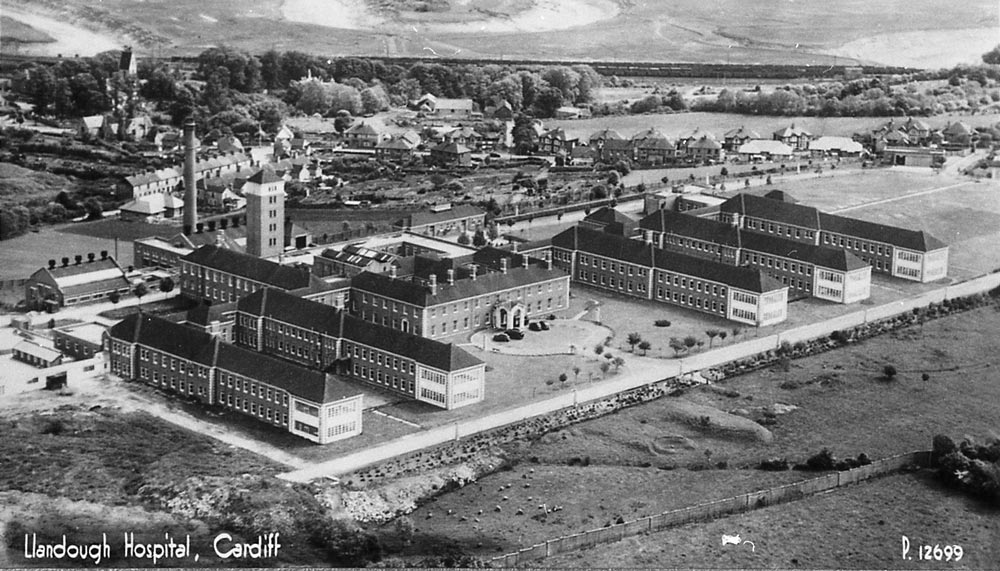
Llandough Hospital (opened 1933)

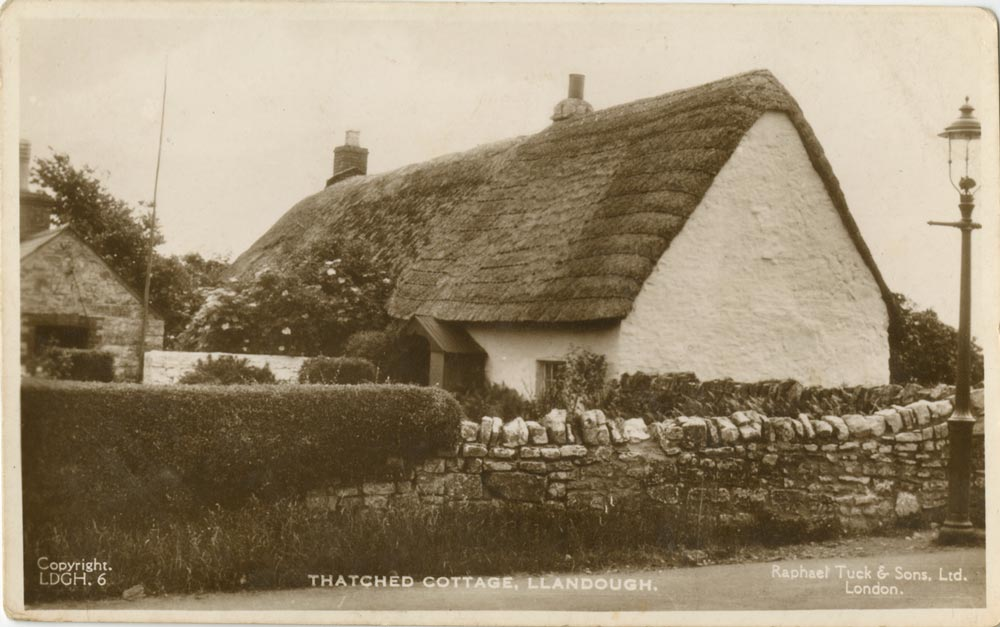
Telford's Cottage

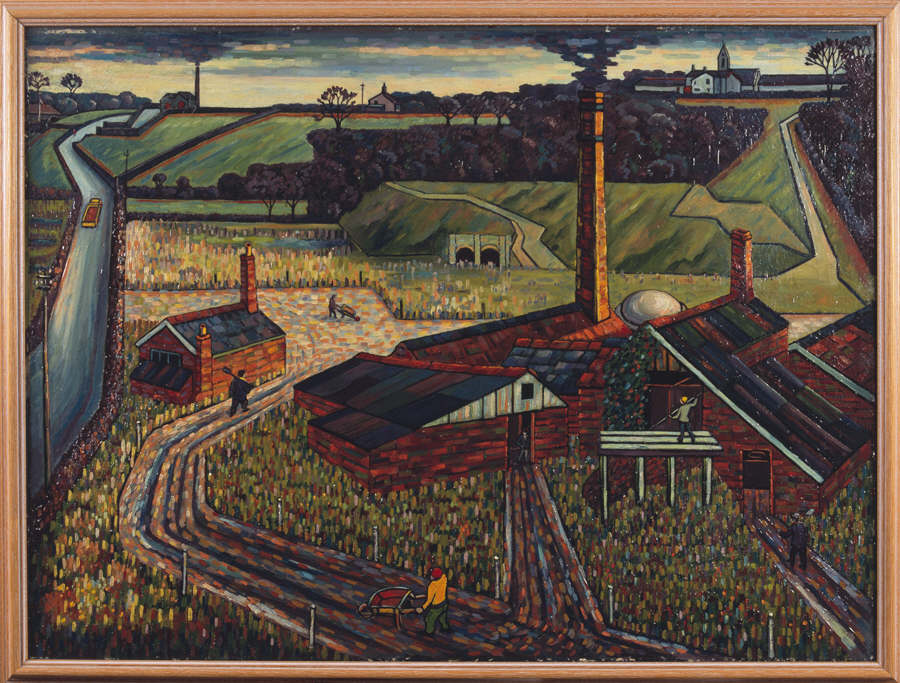
'Brickworks, Llandough' by Charles Byrd, 1950s

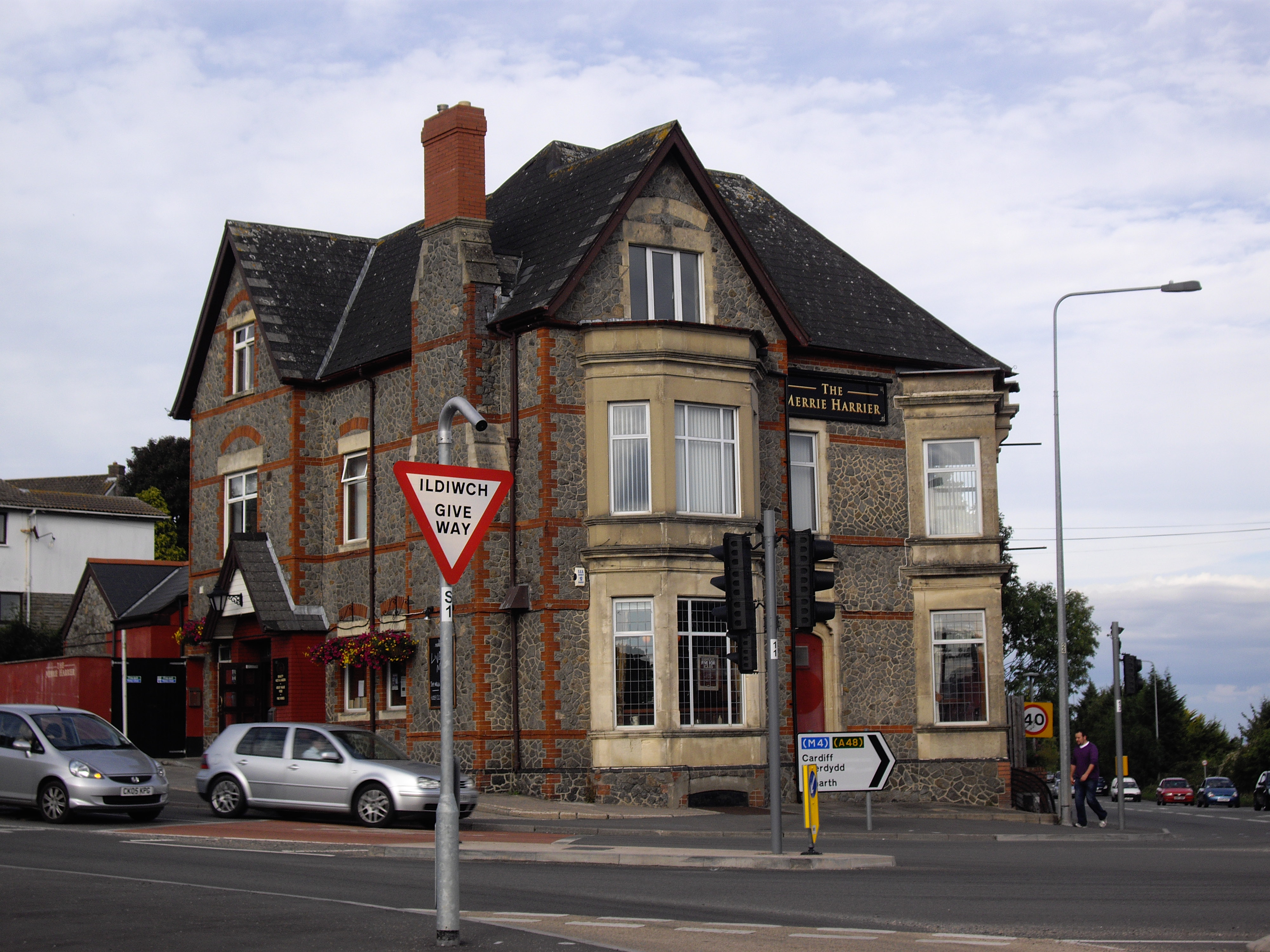
The Merrie Harrier – 2 August 2010
