= University Hospital Llandough =

- Cardiff and Vale University Health Board
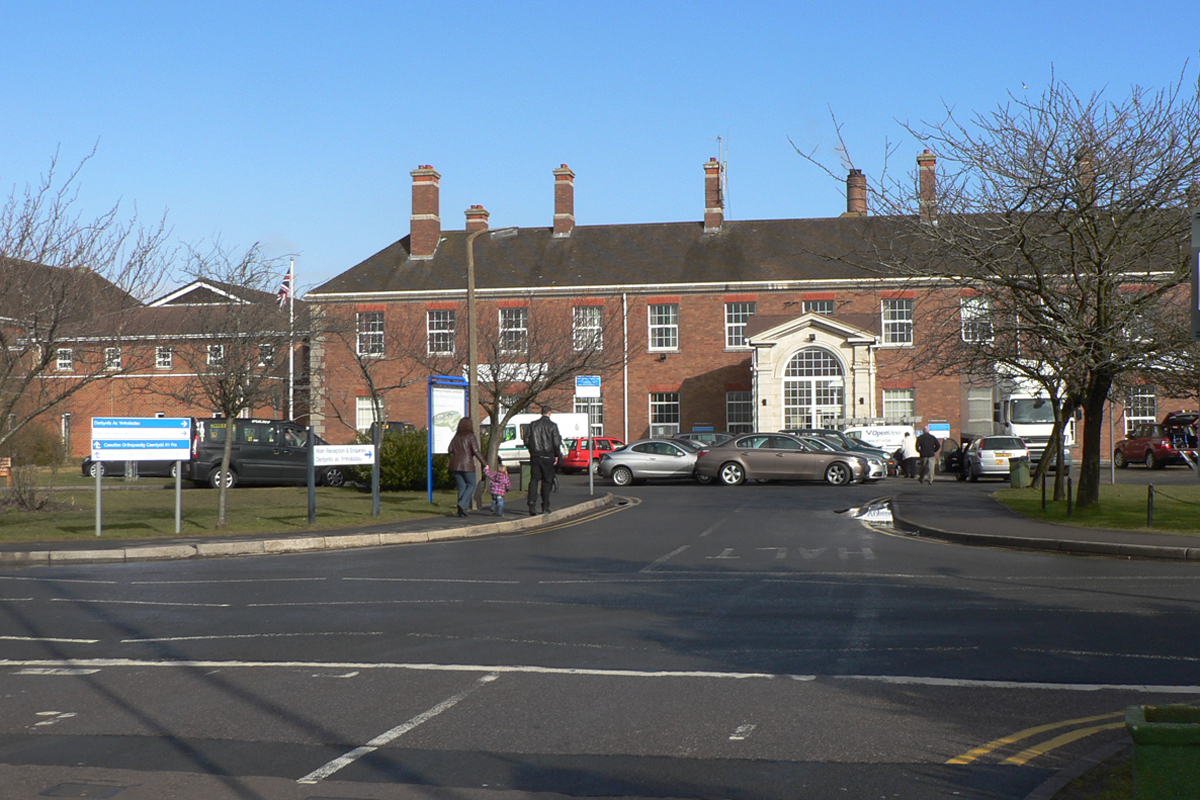
- University Hospital Llandough

- Shown in the Vale of Glamorgan

Geography
- Location: Llandough, Penarth, Vale of Glamorgan, Wales, United Kingdom
- Coordinates: 51.4492°N 3.2028°W

Organisation
- Care system: Public NHS
- Type: General Hospital
- Affiliated university: Cardiff University School of Medicine

History
- Founded: 1933

Links
- Website: www.cardiffandvaleuhb.wales.nhs.uk/uhl-contact-information
- Lists: Hospitals in Wales

University Hospital Llandough (Welsh: Ysbyty Athrofaol Llandochau) is a district general hospital in Llandough, Penarth, Wales. It is managed by the Cardiff and Vale University Health Board.

== History ==
In the first decade the 20th century the Cardiff Board of Guardians realised that the existing accommodation for the sick at the City Lodge was inadequate and waiting lists for admission there had been in excess of 2000 patients at any one time. In order to relieve pressure on the existing hospitals, in 1912 a 48-acre (19 ha) site at Llandough was purchased with a view to building a new hospital there. The First World War and the death of the original architect intended for the project caused significant delays in its planning, but progress had been made by the mid-1920s after a public enquiry for the provision of the hospital. The design involved a pavilion layout which was common of hospitals of the time. Construction of the hospital began in 1928, with Mary, Princess Royal and Countess of Harewood laying the foundation stone, and was completed in 1933.

This design had the five original wards being set perpendicular to a long, central corridor, with an administrative block at its centre. This had the benefit of the wards being away from the noise of the kitchens and boiler houses, while also allowing for easy expansion of the hospital in subsequent decades. Each ward was built with a large solarium at its south end to allow patients exposure to the sun and fresh air when the windows were open, which at the time was believed to be an integral part of a patient's rehabilitation. A commemorative leaflet published shortly after the hospital opened outlined the use of modern technology in the hospital's design. Of note is the mention of a lamp system for silently communicating between members of staff throughout the hospital without disturbing patients.

The high incidence of disease in the South Wales mining valleys, particularly in the anthracite mines, caused the Medical Research Council to establish a pneumoconiosis unit at the hospital to research these issues in 1945. The hospital joined the National Health Service in 1948 and expanded significantly in the subsequent decades, with more wards being built in several phases of construction. The main hospital corridor has expanded to a length of over half a kilometre on the first floor as a result. The hospital was renamed the University Hospital Llandough in 2008 to reflect its links with the Cardiff University School of Medicine. Inpatient adult mental health services were transferred to Llandough in 2016 with the opening of the Hafan y Coed unit. Services were transferred here from Whitchurch Hospital which closed its doors in the same year.

The hospital is home to the Rookwood Sound radio station after it was transferred there from Rookwood Hospital in 2012.
