= Edwin Seward =

British architect (1853–1924)

- Born: 1853; Yeovil, Somerset
- Died: 21 June 1924 (aged 70–71); Weymouth, Dorset
- Occupation: Architect

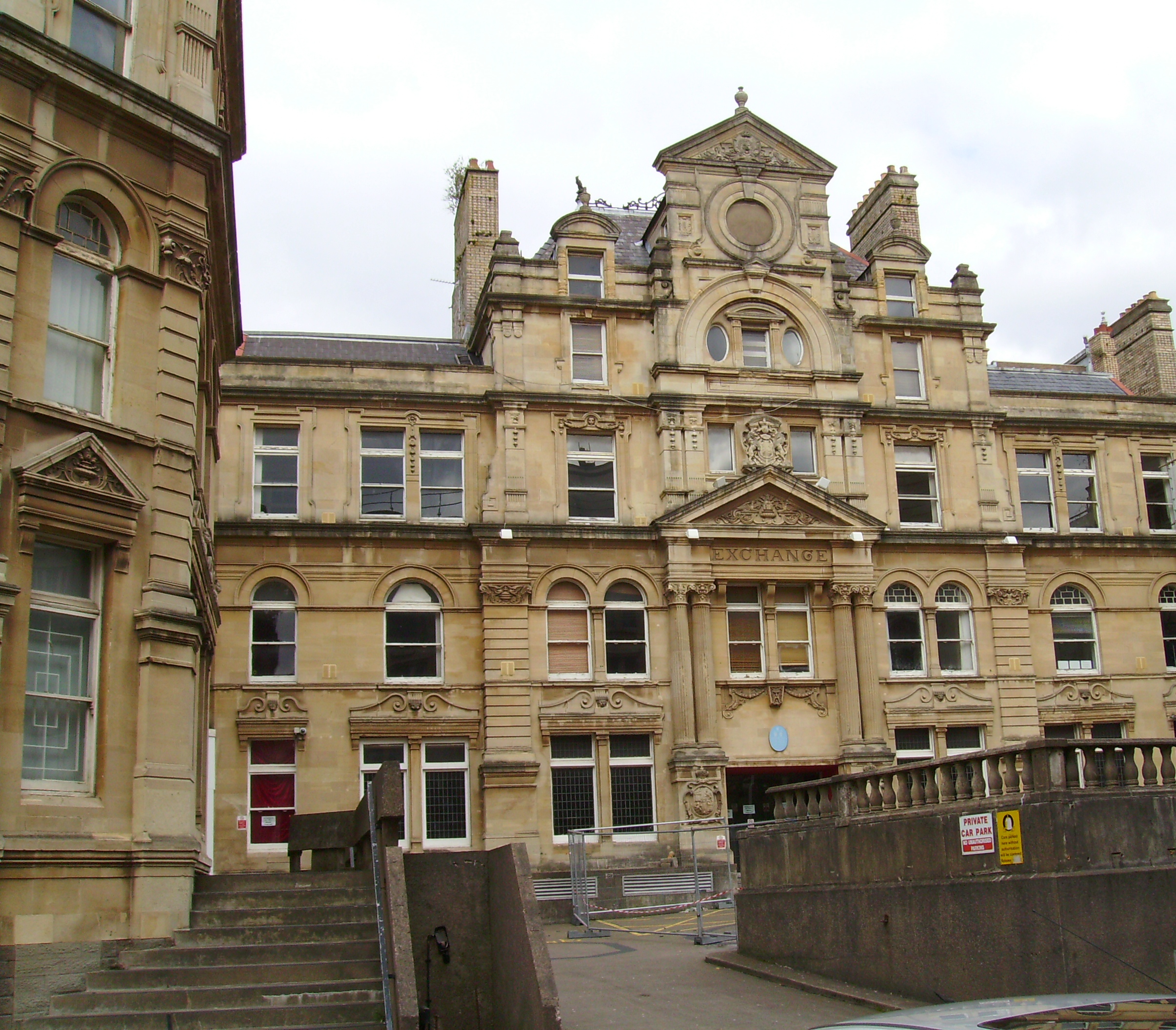
The Coal Exchange, Cardiff

Edwin Seward (1853 – 21 June 1924) was an architect based in Cardiff, Wales.

== Biography ==
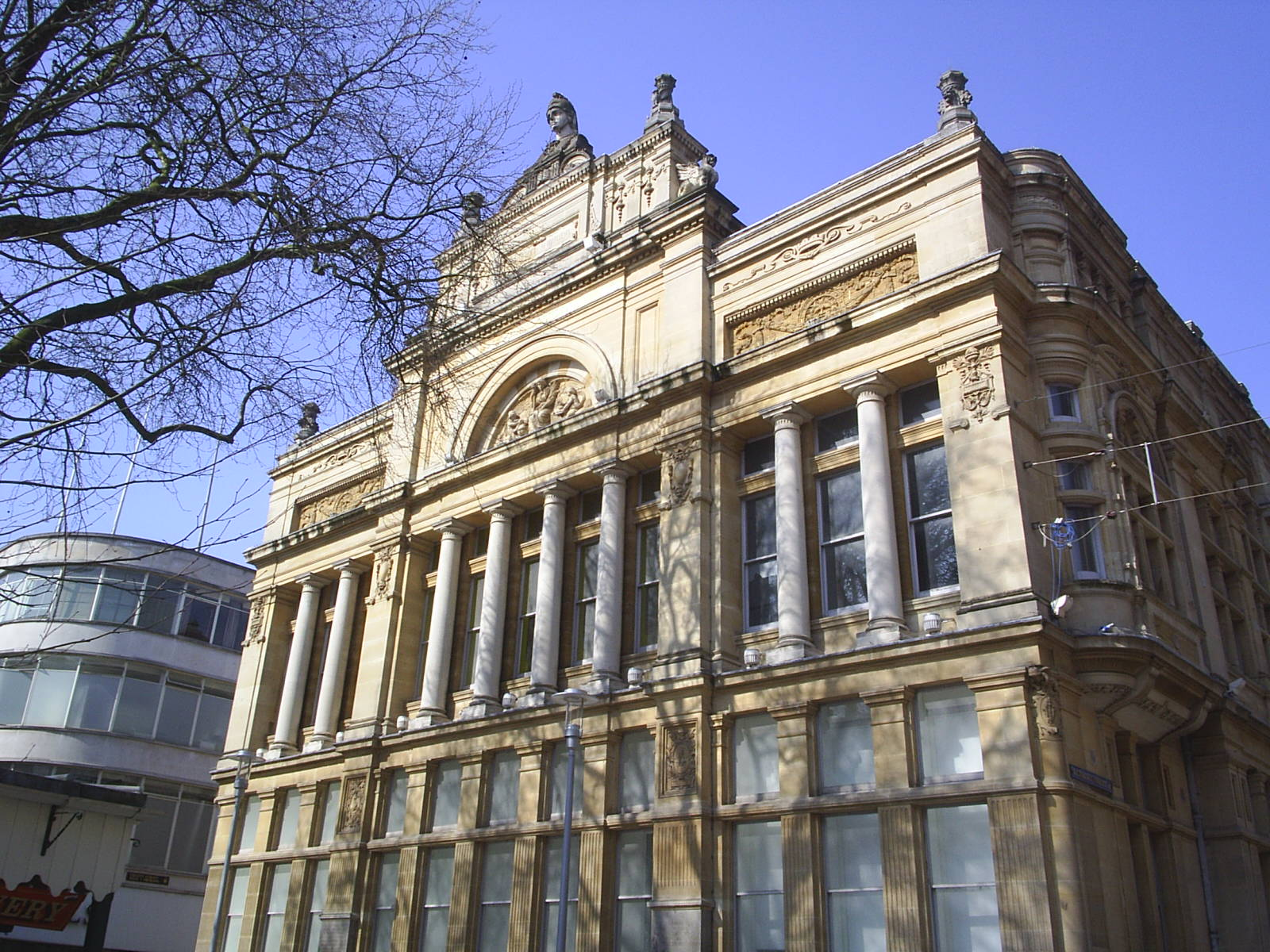
Cardiff Free Library (1882)

Born in Somerset, Seward came to Cardiff aged 16 and studied at the School of Art. He began work as an assistant to architect G. E. Robinson.

Seward was one of the individuals at the centre of Cardiff's young art scene. He was the 21st President of the Cardiff Naturalists' Society (founded 1867) which was a hub of intellectual discussion. He tried unsuccessfully to establish a national institution in Cardiff for Welsh art (the Cambrian Academy of Art eventually set up in Conwy) and was a founding member of the South Wales Art Society in 1888.

By 1875 Seward was a member of the architecture firm James, Seward and Thomas and went on to build some of Cardiff's most notable buildings in the late 19th century.

Whilst in Cardiff, Seward lived in Lisvane house, a property which he remodeled himself and is now Grade II listed. He later retired to Weymouth, Dorset, where he lived until his death.

== Works in Cardiff include ==
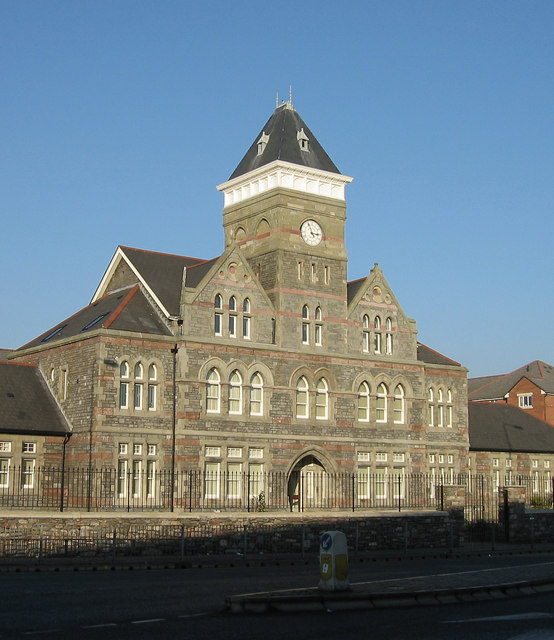
St David's Hospital, Cardiff

- Cardiff Free Library in The Hayes (1880–82)
- St David's Hospital (1881)
- Cardiff Royal Infirmary (1883)
- Coal Exchange (1884–88) in Mount Stuart Square
- David Morgan department stores building
  - two arcades in the city centre
- Llanishen Methodist Church
- New Trinity Church United Reformed Church (demolished in 1998) at junction of Cowbridge Road East and Theobald Rd. Canton Uniting Church rebuilt on same site.

== Works elsewhere ==
Seward designed the Turner House Gallery (1887/8) in Penarth for businessman James Pyke Thompson. He was the winning architect for the Swansea Harbour Trust Building in Swansea and he worked on the widening of the Wye Bridge in Monmouth.
