= Welsh Gender Service =

Welsh gender clinic

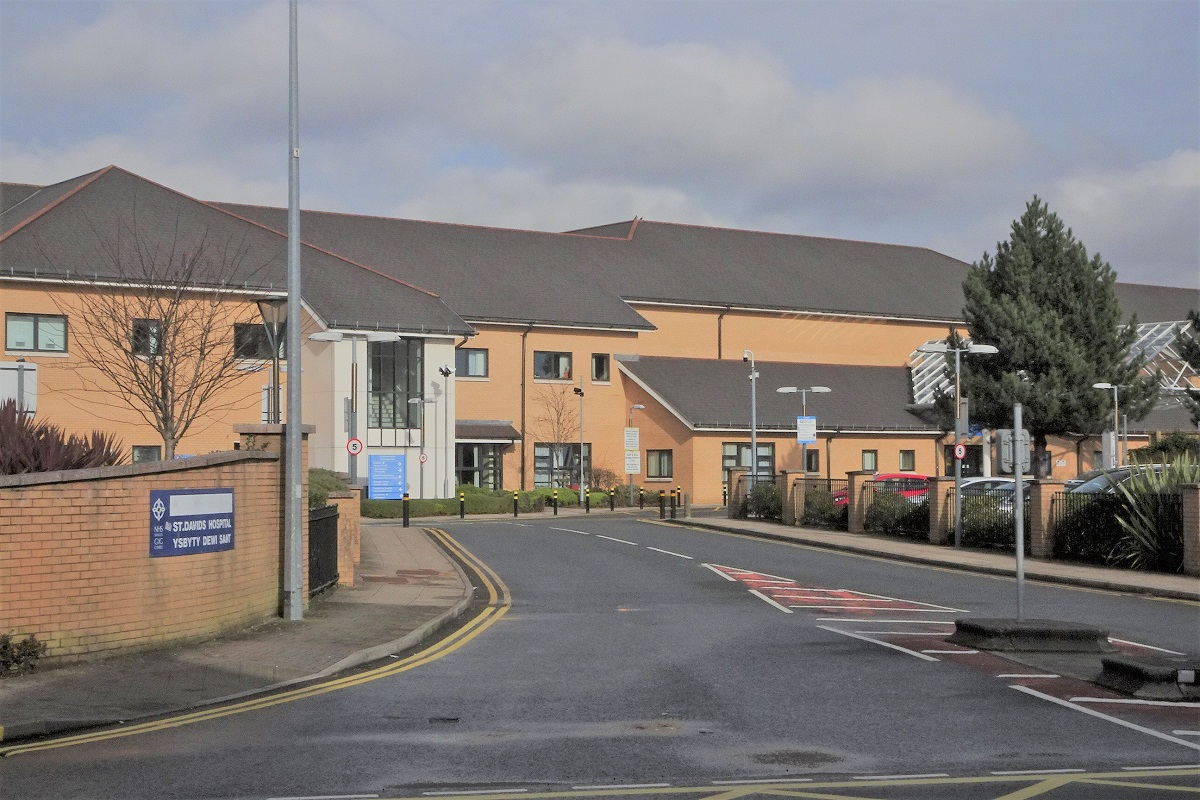
- St Davids NHS Hospital, Cardiff
- Formation: 2019
- Headquarters: St David's Hospital, Cardiff
- Clinical Director: Dr Sophie Quinney
- Affiliations: NHS Wales
- Website: cavuhb.nhs.wales/our-services/welsh-gender-service/

The Welsh Gender Service (WGS) is a gender identity clinic that specialises in gender-affirming healthcare for transgender and gender diverse adults in Wales. It was launched in 2019 by Health Secretary, Vaughan Gething.

== History ==
Campaigners had been petitioning for a Welsh specific clinic for years, due to a number of issues. This included GPs being unable to directly refer patients to the Tavistock and Portman NHS Foundation Trust's clinic in London, causing some patients to wait over a year for their referral to be made. Campaigners argued a Welsh clinic would free up capacity at the London clinic, lowering wait times. Patients also complained of the long travel times to be seen for appointments that lasted only half an hour.

In 2017 Health Secretary Vaughan Gething first announced plans for a Welsh specific transgender healthcare clinic. An interim service was due to start that year, with hopes that the clinic would accept new referrals at the end of March 2018.

In September 2018 a specialist GP service opened to transgender patients seeking hormone replacement therapy in Cardiff and Vale. The Welsh Government explained that they choose the health board due to the majority of patients waiting for medication living in the area. Gething claimed the Welsh Gender Team would begin seeing new patients in October.

Delays caused the planned opening date to be moved to April 2019, only to be delayed again until September. The service began its first clinic on the 20th of September 2019, in St David's Hospital. The service began offering patients previously referred to London the option of being seen in Cardiff. As of 2026, Sophie Quinney serves as the Clinical Director.

In 2022 the Welsh Gender Service opened a satellite clinic for North Wales patients in Holywell Community Hospital.

In late August 2026, the NHS Wales Joint Commissioning Committee paused all referrals for gender affirming surgeries from the WGS with immediate effect, leading some patients to be informed that their surgeries were cancelled mere hours before they were due to be operated on.

=== Structure ===
The Welsh Gender Service is run by the Welsh Gender Team, which consists of consultants, speech and language therapists, gender clinicians and clinical psychologists. In addition, there are Local Gender Teams based in each health board across Wales. The Local Gender Teams enable patients to be seen closer to their home, reducing the need to travel repeatedly to the clinic in Cardiff.

GPs are give the option to sign up to the Local Enhanced Service, enabling them to take over patient's hormone prescriptions. If a patient's GP has signed up, the WGS will refer them to their GP to begin hormone treatment.

The Cardiff and Vale University Health Board contracts Umbrella Cymru to support provide support for anyone referred to WGS. This support is provided by helping patients with name changes, and sign posting them to relevant organisations.
