= Barry Hospital =

- Cardiff and Vale University Health Board
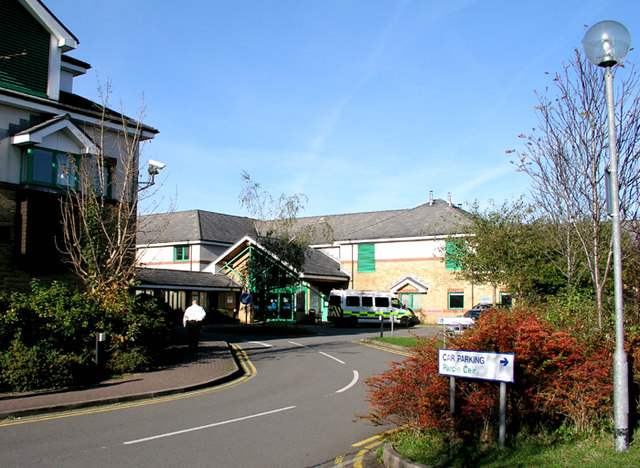
- Barry Hospital

- Shown in Vale of Glamorgan

Geography
- Location: Colcot Road, Barry, Vale of Glamorgan, Wales
- Coordinates: 51.4139°N 3.2850°W

Organisation
- Care system: NHS Wales
- Type: Community

Services
- Emergency department: Minor injuries unit

History
- Founded: 1995

Links
- Website: cavuhb.nhs.wales
- Lists: Hospitals in Wales

Barry Hospital (Welsh: Ysbyty Cymunedol Y Barri) is a hospital on Colcot Road in Barry, Vale of Glamorgan, Wales. It is managed by the Cardiff and Vale University Health Board.

== History ==
The hospital has its origins in the accident ward established by the local Nursing Association in a property in Kingsland Crescent in March 1895. A purpose built hospital was opened in Wyndham Street in December 1908. It joined the National Health Service in 1948 and became Barry Community Hospital in 1973.

The current hospital, which replaced the Barry Community Hospital in Wyndham Street, was completed in 1995. The hospital's minor injury unit reopened after a £240,000 upgrade in May 2015.
