= LGBTQ+ Action Plan for Wales =

The LGBTQ+ Action Plan for Wales is a document released by the Welsh Government in February 2023, that lay out recommendations with the goal of making "Wales the most LGBTQ+ friendly nation in Europe". It was co-written during the 2021 Welsh Labour–Plaid Cymru agreement.

== Background ==
In 2020 the Welsh Government commissioned Stonewall Cymru to publish a survey to capture LGBTQ+ people's experiences in Wales, Stonewall Cymru also held a series of virtual focus groups.

In January 2021 the Independent LGBTQ+ Expert Panel was formed to develop recommendations for the LGBTQ+ Action Plan. The panel was made up of LGBTQ+ community members, and organisation leaders. The Independent LGBTQ+ Expert Panel reviewed the responses, and published a report in March 2021, containing 61 recommendations to be considered for inclusion on the Action Plan.

The Action Plan was announced in the Senedd on the 21 June 2022 by Hannah Blythyn, who was the Deputy Minister for Social Partnership at the time. It was announced to mark 50 years since the first UK pride. It was announced that the plan would provide funding to grassroot pride events across Wales, and that the government would seek legal advice on creating a Welsh specific conversion therapy ban.

On 28 June 2021 a public consultation for the LGBTQ+ Action Plan launched, with both organisations and members of the public able to give feedback on the draft plan and proposed actions. It included recommendations formed by the Independent LGBTQ+ Expert Panel. Jenny-Anne Bishop praised the draft plans inclusion of LGBT subjects in the school curriculum. The consultation ran for 12 weeks, and received 1,328 responses.

== Publication and impact ==
The LGBTQ+ Action Plan was published on 7 February 2023. Hannah Blythyn, and Adam Price marked the occasion by with a press event at St Fagans National Museum of History.

The plan included a promise to start negotiations with the UK Government, with the goal to devolve powers related to Gender Recognition. This point was contentious as in January the UK Government had blocked the Gender Recognition Reform (Scotland) Bill. Other recommendations included further support for LGBTQ+ asylum seekers, encouraging private sector employers to be LGBTQ+ inclusive, and to encourage public sector services to run LGBTQ+ awareness events. The plan also committed to review the Gender Identity Development pathway for young people in Wales.

The action plan was praised by Victor Madrigal-Borloz, following his United Nations visit to the UK. Mark Drakeford accepted the CEO Award from Trans in the City in 2023, in celebration of the Welsh Government's work producing the LGBTQ+ Action Plan.

Adam Price, and Andrew RT Davies have both stated that their respective parties of Plaid Cymru, and the Conservative Party support the action plan, and will hold Labour accountable, to ensure the goals are met.

Some organisations were critical of the plan, claiming the language wasn't strong enough, or was vague. Others worried that there wasn't enough dedicated structures or staff in place to ensure the implementation of the plan. Parents of transgender children were frustrated with the plan to review the Gender Identity Development pathway. Although the Welsh Government had committed to improve the service, patients faced long wait times, and were told they'd have to travel to London for the healthcare. The Welsh Health Specialised Services Committee, who commission transgender healthcare services for children in Wales, stated in March 2024 that they had no plans to develop a children's gender service in Wales.

In May 2023 the Welsh government commissioned a third party company to produce an evaluability assessment of the action plan. This was published in November 2024, and in February 2025 the Welsh Government shared that it was seeking an organisation to evaluate the effectiveness of the action plan.

=== Grassroots Pride Fund ===
The plan led to the foundation of the All-Wales Grassroots Pride Fund being created in 2023. The fund was formed to help fund rural Welsh pride events, to ensure wider opportunities for LGBTQ+ performers. In 2025 the Welsh Government handed the administration of the fund to Pride Cymru. In 2025 the Pride Fund consisted of £38,250. The funding has previously been used to help fund Barry Pride, Swansea Pride, and Cowbridge Pride.

=== Banning conversion practices in Wales ===
The Welsh Government committed to "Ban all aspects of LGBTQ+ Conversion Practices" in Wales as part of the LGBTQ+ Action Plan. In December 2022 the Working Group on Banning Conversion Practices was formed to advise on any proposed actions to ban conversion practices in Wales. Members of the group included Jayne Ozanne and Kate Nambiar.

In May 2024 the government announced that it had partnered with Galop to provide a first of its kind in-person support service for people affected by conversion practices. The service was due to be launched in late 2024, but As of 2026, there have been no updates on the proposed service.
