= Llanishen Methodist Church =

Church in Cardiff, Wales

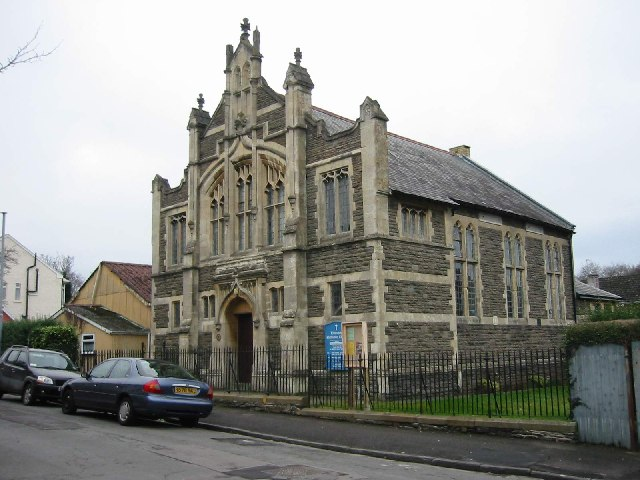
- The church in 2006 with the later schoolroom at left.
- Llanishen Methodist Church
- 51.529°N 3.1841°W
- Denomination: Methodist Church of Great Britain
- Website: www.llanishenmethodistchurch.co.uk/index.html

History
- Status: Active
- Founded: 1900

Architecture
- Heritage designation: Grade II
- Designated: 31 March 1999
- Architect: Edwin Seward
- Style: Gothic Revival
- Groundbreaking: 9 September 1900
- Completed: 1901

Specifications
- Materials: stone

Llanishen Methodist Church, also known as Century Chapel, is a listed place of worship in Llanishen, a suburb of Cardiff in Wales.

== History ==
The church can trace its origins back to a Religious Society in the 18th century, the existence of which predated the visits of John and Charles Wesley in 1740–1742. The Society at first was small and had no resident place of worship. They initially met in members' houses and also made use of barns in what was then a rural village. The congregation had no church of their own until 1856, when their first chapel was built. After the opening of Llanishen railway station in 1871 the village began to develop and new housing was built, leading Llanishen to begin to transform from a village into a suburb of Cardiff. In response to the potential increase in congregation numbers, the Roath Road Wesleyan Methodist Circuit planned a new chapel for Llanishen (a new one in Birchgrove would soon follow), with the founding stone being laid in 1900. The 1856 chapel was closed once the replacements were built, though only four people transferred to the new Llanishen chapel. At a later date in the 20th century a prefabricated schoolroom was added, which is still present.

== Later developments ==
The church became a grade II listed building in 1999 as "a complete, compact Edwardian chapel in late Gothic style by the pre-eminent Cardiff architect of the period. (Probably Seward's only surviving chapel)."

The church has a Quiet Garden, which opened in 2006.
