= Morgans Hotel, Swansea =

Boutique hotel in Swansea, Wales

Morgans Hotel
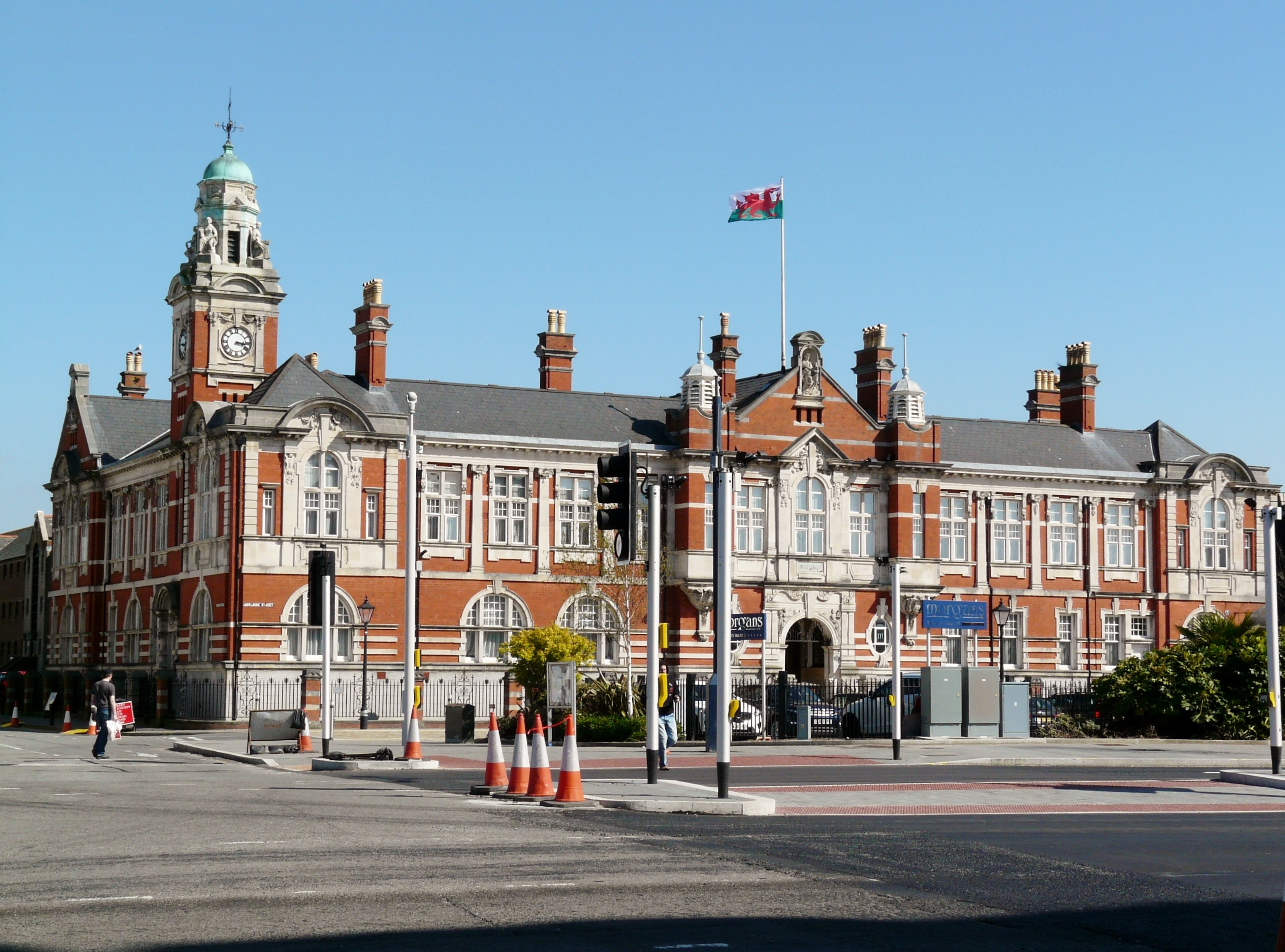
- Morgans Hotel
- Interactive map of the Morgans Hotel area
- Former names: Swansea Harbour Trust Building, Associated British Ports Building

General information
- Location: Somerset Place, Swansea, SA1 1RR
- Coordinates: 51°37′08.00″N 3°56′10.00″W
- Construction started: 18 February 1902
- Inaugurated: 12 October 1902

Design and construction
- Architect: Edwin Seward

Morgans Hotel is a hotel in the centre of Swansea, Wales. The hotel occupies the former Swansea Harbour Trust Building, which is Grade II* listed building.

The hotel is steeped in maritime history and the building was formerly used by the Associated British Ports. The hotel has 42 rooms, 20 in the main building and 22 in the Regency-style townhouse next door.

Originally completed in 1903 for the Swansea Harbour Trust, the main hotel building was designed by architect Edwin Seward who submitted the winning design out of 100 entries. The original character of the building is still preserved after its conversion to a hotel. The decorative Baroque exterior is clad in red brick and white stone and topped by a Greek statue-clad clock cupola. The interior features stained glass with compasses, exploration and maritime themes. A mural by Cardiff-born artist Robert Morton Nance (1873–1959) depicting tall masted ships on the River Tawe, overlooked by Swansea Castle, decorates the boardroom .

Previous names for the building have included "The Swansea Harbour Trust Office", The British Transport Docks Board Office" and " The Associated British Ports Office", reflecting the names of the building's occupiers.
