= Cardiff Royal Infirmary =

- Cardiff and Vale University Health Board
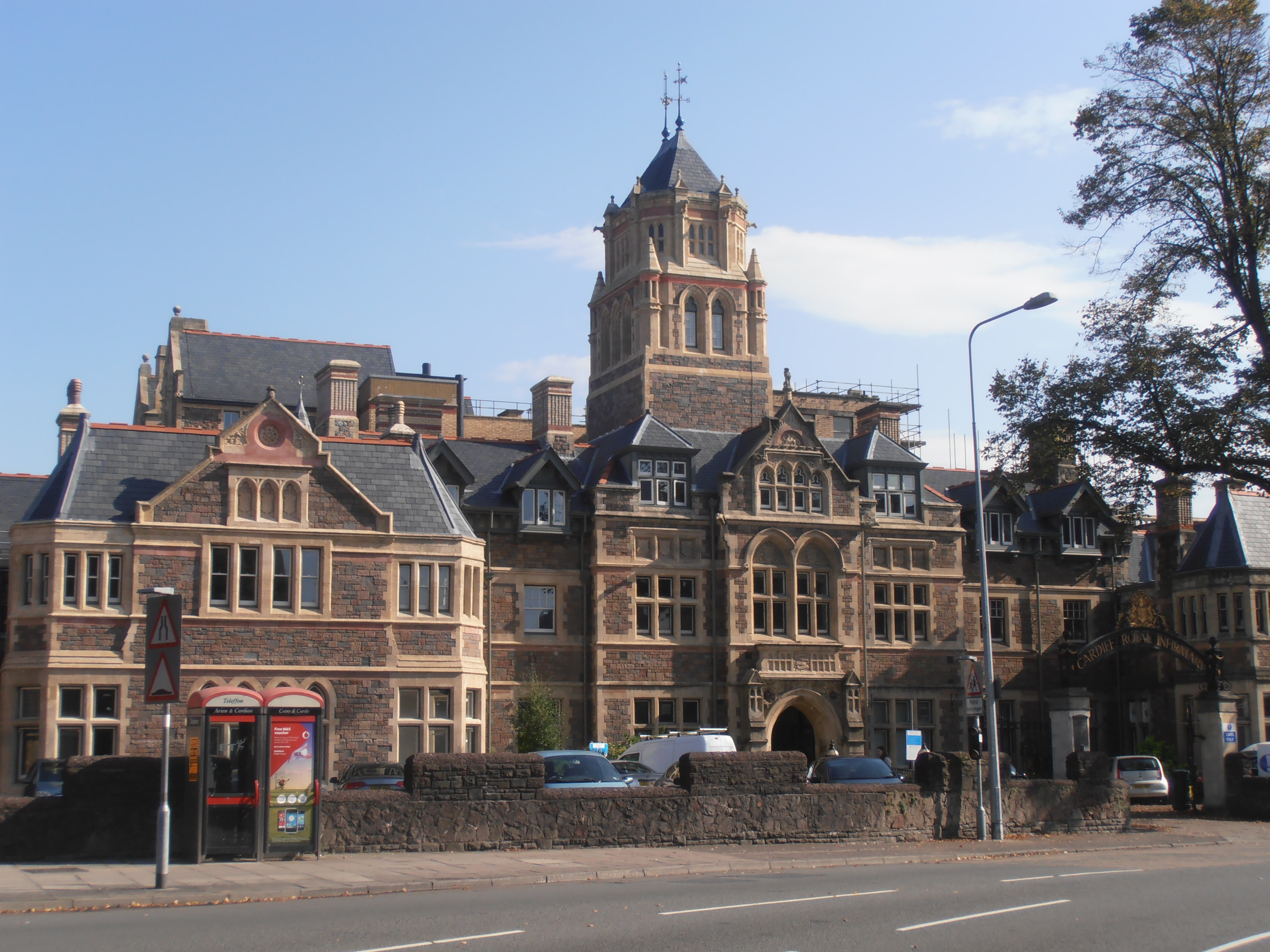
- Edwin Seward's 1883 main building

- Shown in Cardiff

Geography
- Location: Cardiff, Wales, United Kingdom
- Coordinates: 51.4847°N 3.1613°W

Organisation
- Care system: Public NHS
- Type: General

History
- Former name: Edward VII Hospital
- Founded: 1822

Links
- Lists: Hospitals in Wales

Listed Building – Grade II
- Official name: Cardiff Royal Infirmary (including forecourt wall and gatepiers)
- Designated: 31 July 1997
- Reference no.: 18639

Cardiff Royal Infirmary (Welsh: Ysbyty Brenhinol Caerdydd) (also known as the CRI or YBC) is a hospital in central Cardiff, Wales. It is managed by the Cardiff and Vale University Health Board.

== History ==
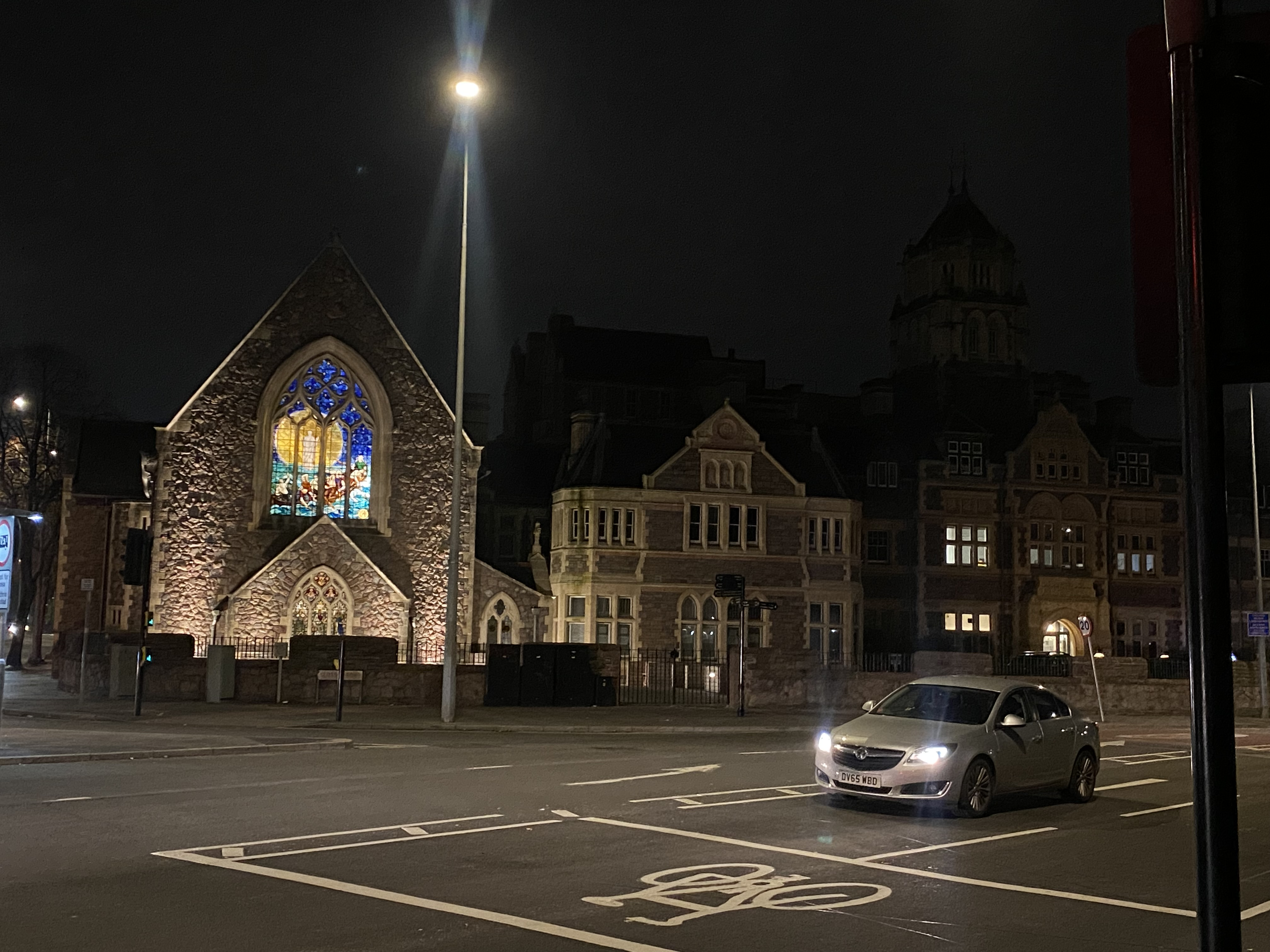
The former chapel's stained glass window. The chapel is now the home of Adamsdown Library

The hospital has its origins in the Cardiff Dispensary, which began on Newport Road in 1822. It became the Glamorganshire and Monmouthshire Infirmary and Dispensary in 1837. The current main hospital building facing Glossop Road, Adamsdown, was designed by Edwin Seward and opened in 1883. It became known as King Edward VII Hospital in 1911.

In 1911 the coronation of George V and Queen Mary and the investiture of the Prince of Wales was marked by naming a ward the Coronation Ward. It was decorated with picture tiles depicting the coronation and investiture painted by Grace Bradley and made by W.B Simpson and Sons. Bradley also painted picture tiles of Welsh history for the William James Thomas Ward. Artist Philip Newman designed tiles for the John Nixon Ward.

During the First World War, the building was requisitioned by the War Office to create the 3rd Western General Hospital, a facility for the Royal Army Medical Corps to treat military casualties. It returned to its current name, Cardiff Royal Infirmary, in 1923. By the time it joined the National Health Service in 1948 it had expanded to become a 500-bed facility.

The hospital ceased operating as a casualty facility in 1999, with the Accident and Emergency department being moved to University Hospital of Wales in the north of the city. Some services were successfully retained at the site after a public campaign.

In 2009, a review into healthcare provision in Cardiff recommended that the hospital should be refurbished and developed into a local hospital that would be able to provide outpatient and occupational services. Renovation plans were approved in 2009, with the Welsh Health Minister, Edwina Hart, approving a £3m grant towards the planned renovation. This marked the start of extensive renovations that occurred through the 2010s which allowed medical facilities to return to the site, including a GP service, a sexual health clinic, a genito urinary medicine department, physiotherapy clinic, and a podiatry clinic. £30 million was spent on the first phase of renovations.

In the 2020s work was completed to turn the infirmary's old chapel into a public library, with the nearby Adamsdown Library moving into the building. This was completed as part of the second phase of renovations and has provided an event space for the community.

== Notable staff ==
Eileen Rees, a nurse and nurse educationist, trained at Cardiff Royal Infirmary. She worked for 15 years as Matron before taking on the new role of Chief Nursing Officer at University Hospital of Wales following the implementation of the recommendations in the Salmon Report.

== In the media ==
In 2005 the CRI buildings became Albion Hospital, in a two-part episode of the BBC's Doctor Who series, entitled Aliens of London/World War Three.
