= Cardiff and Vale University Health Board =

NHS local health board in South East Wales

- Bwrdd Iechyd Prifysgol Caerdydd a'r Fro

- Map of service area in Wales
- Type: NHS Wales local health board
- Established: 1 October 2009
- Headquarters: Woodland House; Maes-y-Coed Road; Cardiff; CF14 4HH
- Region served: Cardiff; Vale of Glamorgan
- Hospitals: Barry Hospital; Cardiff Royal Infirmary; Noah's Ark Children's Hospital for Wales; Rookwood Hospital; St David's Hospital; University Hospital Llandough; University Hospital of Wales
- Staff: 15,614 (2019/20)
- Website: cavuhb.nhs.wales

Cardiff and Vale University Health Board (CAVUHB; Welsh: Bwrdd Iechyd Prifysgol Caerdydd a'r Fro) is the local health board of NHS Wales for Cardiff and Vale of Glamorgan, in the south-east of Wales. Formed on 1 October 2009 through the amalgamation of three NHS organisations in the Cardiff and Vale of Glamorgan area. The three organisations amalgamated were: Cardiff and Vale NHS Trust, employing 12,000 staff and previously responsibility for hospital services in the Cardiff and Vale of Glamorgan area; Cardiff Local Health Board; and Vale of Glamorgan Local Health Board both responsible for GP, Dental, Optical and pharmacy services. The headquarters of the Board is in the University Hospital of Wales, in Cardiff. Cardiff and Vale University Health Board is the operational name of Cardiff and Vale Local Health Board.

The Board supports a population of around 445,000 people living in Cardiff and the Vale of Glamorgan. It oversees seventeen health centres, public health and community care services and also has a range of specialist services used by the whole of Wales, including renal, paediatric, neurology and bone marrow transplantation.

As of June 2020, Charles Janczewski is the chairman of the Board. Suzanne Rankin is Chief Executive.

The board is one of the first organisations in the UK to make wifi available in its hospitals, on the basis that enables patients to stay in touch with their family and friends, and improves the way it interacts with patients.

== Hospitals ==
- Barry Hospital is a 60-bed community hospital on Colcot Road in Colcot, Barry, in the Vale of Glamorgan.
- Cardiff Royal Infirmary is a hospital situated in the heart of Cardiff.
- Hafan y Coed Mental Health Unit
- Lansdowne Hospital
- Noah's Ark Children's Hospital for Wales is the only dedicated children's hospital in Wales
- Rookwood Hospital is a rehabilitation hospital situated in Llandaff, in the city of Cardiff in South Wales.
- St David's Hospital is a hospital in Cardiff with facilities serving for older people and rehabilitation patients. It is also home to the Welsh Gender Service.
- University Dental Hospital (UDH)
- University Hospital Llandough is a District General Hospital with 480 beds, located 5 miles from the centre of Cardiff, in Penarth.
- University Hospital of Wales is a major hospital in Cardiff with over 1,000 beds

== Performance ==
It was reported that there had been 3,609 recorded staff complaints about staffing levels between 2012 and 2015. A review published in July 2015 found the emergency department was "significantly under-staffed" and had a poor skill mix, particularly in the paediatric department.
