= Rookwood Hospital =

Hospital in Cardiff, Wales

- Cardiff and Vale University Health Board
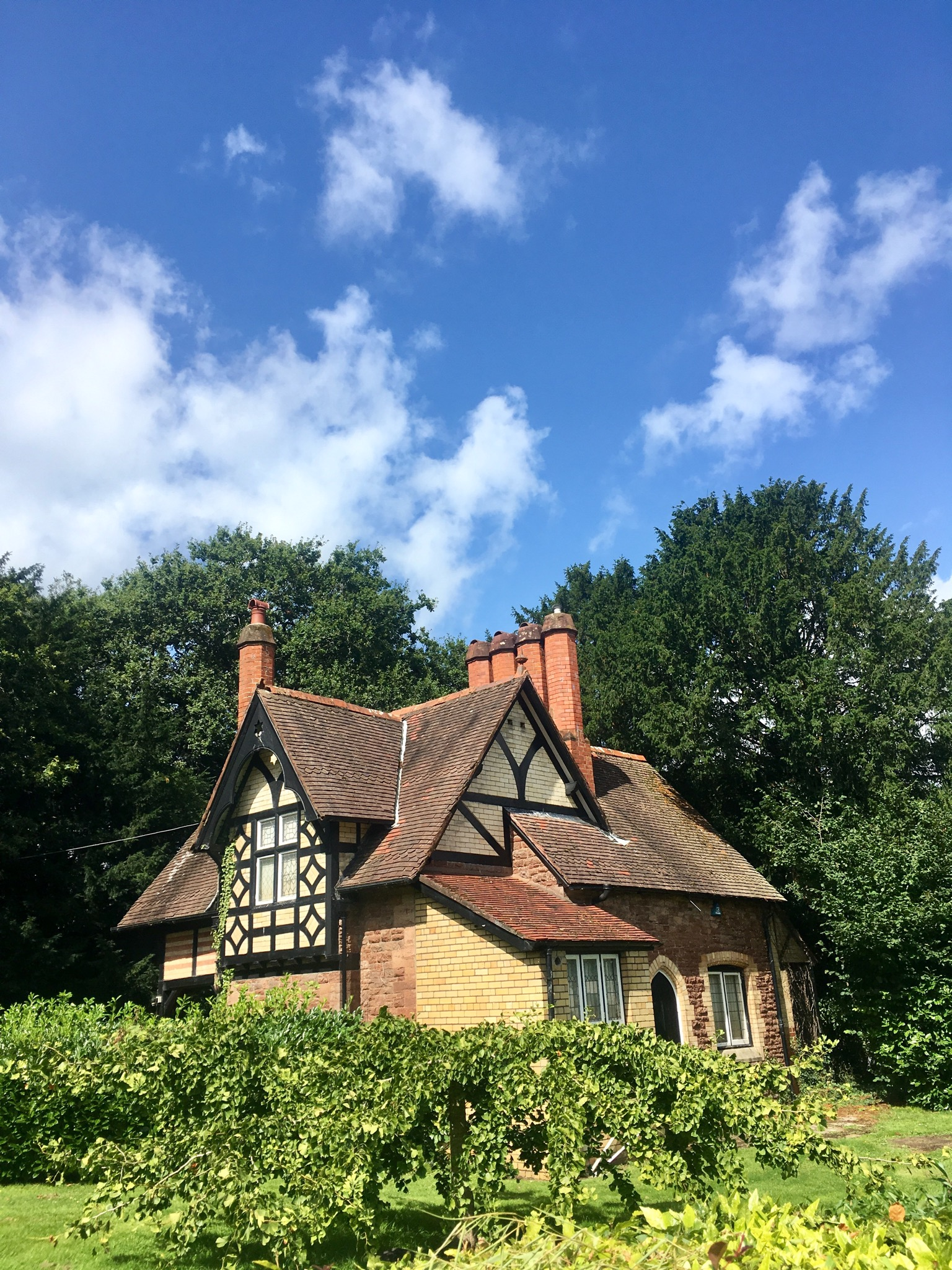
- The lodge to Rookwood House

- Shown in Cardiff

Geography
- Location: Llandaff, Cardiff, Wales, United Kingdom
- Coordinates: 51.49445°N 3.22618°W

Organisation
- Care system: NHS Wales
- Type: General

History
- Founded: 1932

Links
- Website: www.cardiffandvaleuhb.wales.nhs.uk/rookwood-hospital
- Lists: Hospitals in Wales

Rookwood Hospital (Welsh: Ysbyty Rookwood) was a rehabilitation hospital situated in Llandaff, in the city of Cardiff in South Wales. It was managed by Cardiff and Vale University Health Board.

== History ==
Rookwood was built for Colonel Sir Edward Hill in 1886; he, and subsequently Lady Hill, lived there until 1917. The name 'Rookwood' was given to the house during its course of construction by Lady Hill. Before her marriage she was brought to see the building construction and was asked to find a suitable name for it. When she came to the property, a number of rooks were flying overhead and she immediately thought of 'Rookwood', and decided that it should be the name.

In 1918 Rookwood was taken over for use as a convalescent home. At the end of the First World War it was purchased by Sir Lawrence Phillips and presented to the ministry as a home for Welsh paraplegic pensioner cases. After that it was used by the University Hospital of Wales. In 1932, after being extended, it became a general hospital. During the 1970s and 1980s Rookwood had eight wards caring for people with spinal injuries, brain injury, stroke, multiple sclerosis, and Parkinson's disease.

The hospital gardens and grounds are Cadw/ICOMOS Register of Parks and Gardens of Special Historic Interest in Wales.

== Services ==
Rookwood provided specialist neurological and spinal rehabilitation services. The Rookwood Hospital site still hosts the Artificial Limb and Appliance Service.

== Hospital radio ==
Rookwood Hospital was the home to Rookwood Sound Hospital Radio, which broadcasts from the site and to the University Hospital Llandough and is where radio presenter Huw Stephens began his career at 14.
