= St David's Hospital, Cardiff =

St David's Hospital
- Cardiff and Vale University Health Board
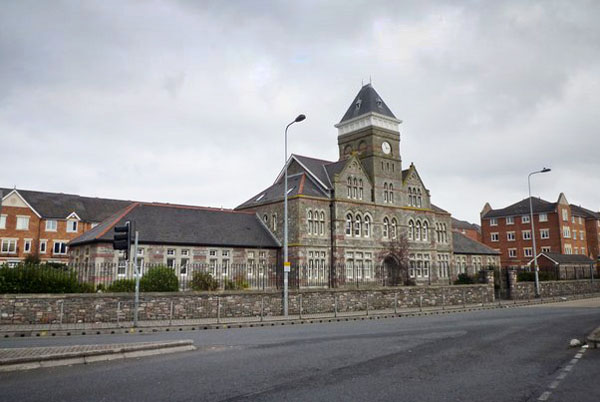
- The Grade II listed entrance building of the previous St David's Hospital, now converted into apartments

- Shown in Cardiff

Geography
- Location: Cardiff, Wales, United Kingdom
- Coordinates: 51.4808°N 3.1914°W

Organisation
- Care system: Public NHS
- Type: General

History
- Founded: 1839

Links
- Lists: Hospitals in Wales

St David's Hospital (Welsh: Ysbyty Dewi Sant) is a health facility in Canton, Cardiff, Wales. It is managed by the Cardiff and Vale University Health Board. The original main block is a Grade II listed building.

== History ==
=== Original hospital ===
Cardiff created its own Poor Law Union in 1836 and the new Cardiff Union Workhouse, which was built on Cowbridge Road at a cost of £7,500, opened in 1839. Because of the growing population of the area, in 1862 child inmates were relocated to the Ely Industrial Schools. In 1872 an infirmary for the sick was added to the northwest of the workhouse, with 164 beds.

The building was expanded in 1881, including a new entrance building on the Cowbridge Road frontage with a 3-storey tower and clock face. New accommodation included a committee room, waiting rooms and attendants' offices. The architects were James, Seward & Thomas and the exterior design had similarities to Seward's 1883 Cardiff Infirmary, though using cheaper materials. The buildings were further expanded in 1890 and, by 1908, the workhouse had a capacity for over 1,000 inmates.

The hospital joined the National Health Service as St David's Hospital in 1948. Notable people born in the maternity unit at St David's Hospital include Wales footballer, Ryan Giggs, who was born there in 1973. It closed in the early 1990s and the majority of the old buildings were demolished, leaving the Victorian entrance building and clock tower. This fell into disrepair and was the target of vandalism, but in 2002 it was refurbished and converted into apartments.

=== Modern hospital ===
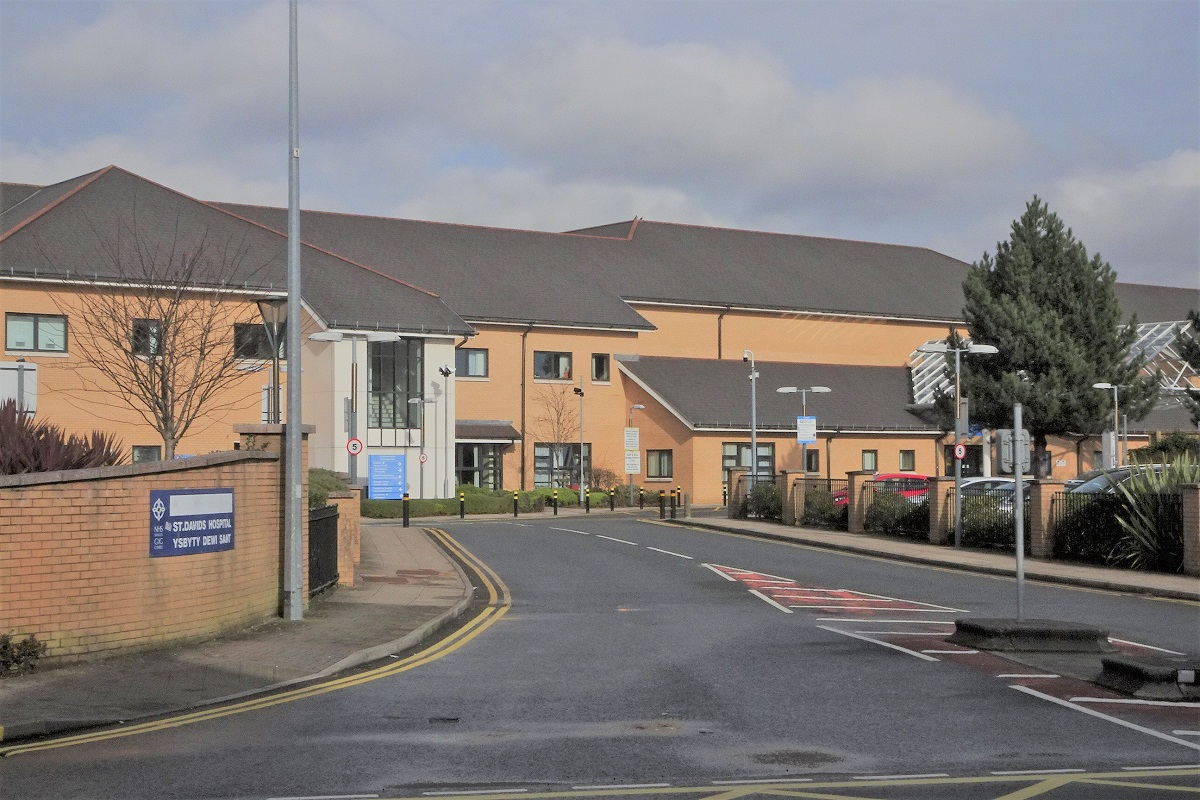
Entrance to St David's Hospital

A modern facility, located to the rear of the old hospital, was commissioned under a private finance initiative contract in 1999. The facility, which was designed by HL Design and built by Macob Construction at a cost of £16 million, opened on Saint David's Day 2002.

Facilities included 100 beds, initially for mental health patients (transferred from Royal Hamadryad Hospital) and the elderly (from Lansdowne Hospital) but also including children's services, therapies and dental services.
