= Swansea Pride =

Annual LGBT festival in Swansea, Wales

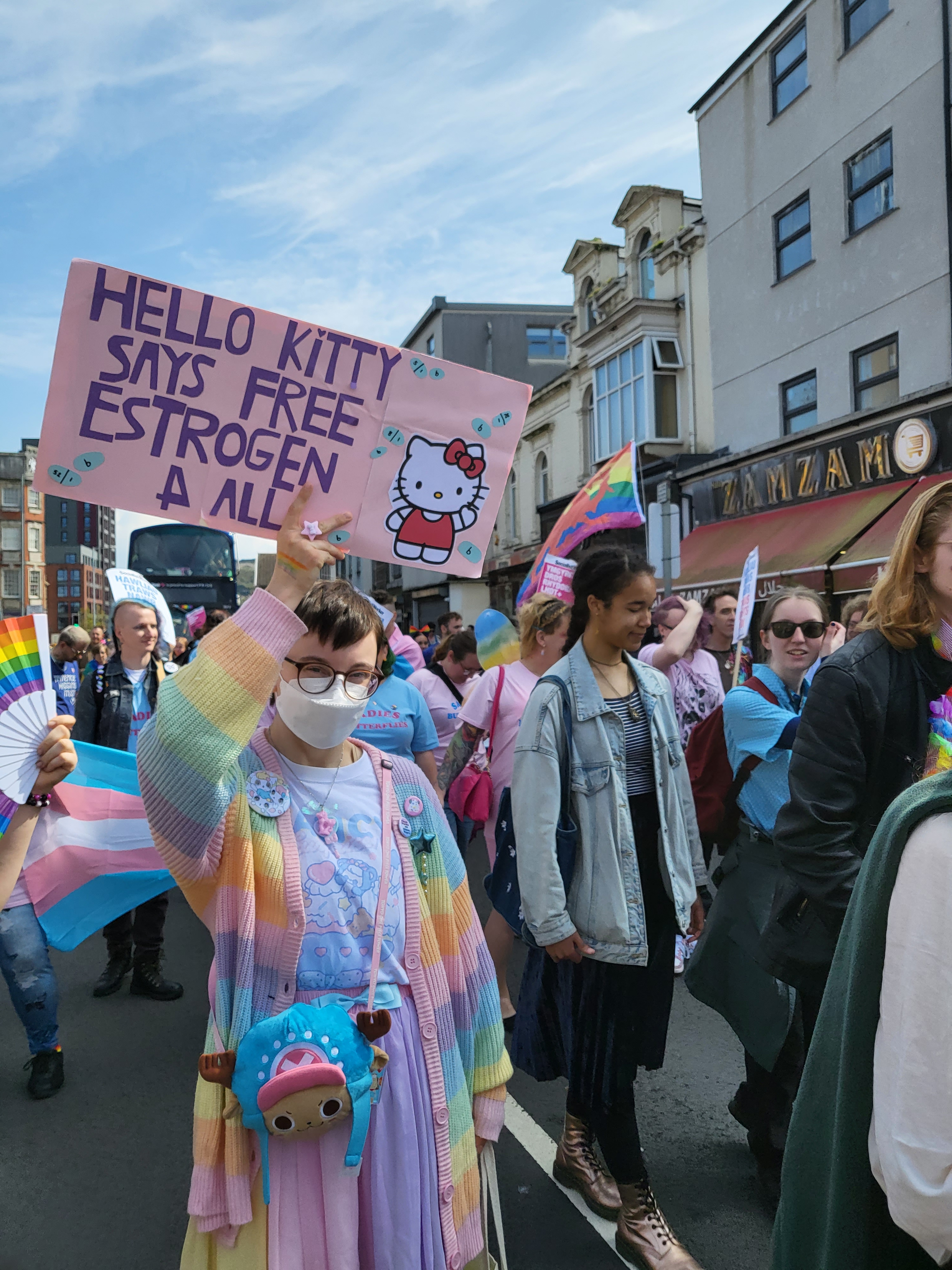
- A Swansea Pride attendee holds a sign while marching in the parade (2023)
- Genre: Pride parade
- Frequency: Annually
- Venue: Swansea Guildhall
- Location: Swansea
- Country: Wales, U.K.
- Inaugurated: 2008 (18 years ago)
- Organiser: Spectrum South West Wales
- Website: swanseapride.co.uk

Swansea Pride is the annual South West Wales LGBTQ festival which is held in Swansea, Wales.

== History ==
Swansea Pride was founded in 2008 by group of local LGBTQ people who wanted to bring an outdoor Pride event to. The initial committee was comprised entirely by volunteers, with no previous professional event organising experience.

Pink in the Park, the first event, took place at Singleton Park on 28 June 2009. The event had a larger than expected attendance and Kelly Llorenna, Scooch, and local entertainers performed. The festival was also used as a way to raise money and awareness for the HIV and AIDS charity, Terrence Higgins Trust.

Following the second Swansea Pride event in 2010, the event's volunteers decided to constitute as a registered charity. The decision to become a charity was made to publicly demonstrate that Swansea Pride is a not-for-profit event run by volunteers for the benefit of the local LGBT community, their friends and families.

In 2013 the charity changed its name to Spectrum South West Wales while keeping the name Swansea Pride exclusively for the event. The reason for the name change was to allow the charity to undertake other events and activities for and on behalf of the local LGBT community.

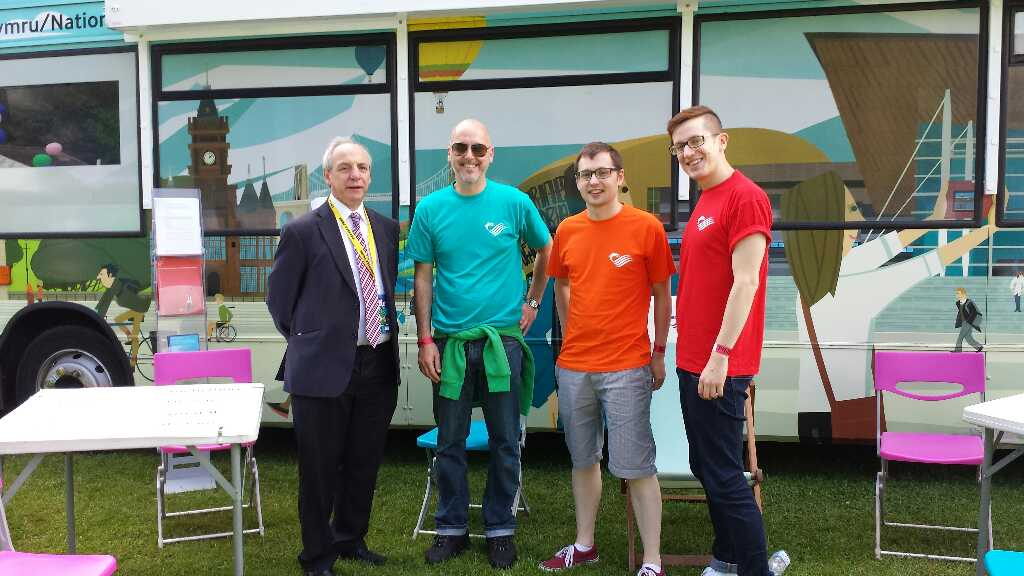
Senedd Cymru – Welsh Parliament outreach bus and staff at the Swansea Pride; July 2013

The seventh annual event, Swansea Pride 2015, was cancelled on 14 April 2015. Financial difficulties and a lack of volunteers were cited as the reasons the event was cancelled.

On Friday 19 June 2015 a public meeting was held at the charity's office where a public vote decided to start planning and preparation for a Swansea Pride event in 2016. A new contingent of volunteers were recruited to the event Organising Committee & its constituent sub-committees.

Historically, the event was held on the last Saturday in June each year. However, since the relaunch of London Pride the decision was made to move to another date. The date for the 2016 event was scheduled to be 30 April 2016. However the event did not happen due to a lack of funding.

In 2018 Swansea Pride returned, thanks to community members working together with the National Waterfront Museum, and Swansea Council. As a result, the first Swansea Spring Pride event was held on Saturday 5 May 2018 at the Waterfront Museum. In 2019 the full festival returned on the Museum Green, outside the Waterfront Museum. The event also featured a parade, that started on Wind Street and made its way to the Museum green.

The event was cancelled in 2020, and 2021 due to the COVID-19 pandemic.

In 2023 the event had to be moved from the National Waterfront Museum to Swansea Guildhall. This was due to weeks of heavy rain causing the Museum Park grass to become unstable and muddy. Since the move in 2023, the annual event has continued to be held on the ground of the Guildhall, with community stalls being held in the neighbouring Brangwyn Hall. The parade still begins at Wind Street and attendees march to the Guildhall Grounds together.

== See also ==
- List of festivals in Wales
- List of LGBTQ events
