= List of Welsh-language media =

This article lists and provides a summary of the content of some of those broadcast, print, and other media currently being produced in the Welsh language.

== Television ==
=== Current channels ===
S4C broadcasts exclusively in Welsh and has an annual budget of approximately £100 million. BBC Cymru Wales and HTV carried some Welsh programmes prior to S4C's formation in 1982 and still produce programmes for the commissioning broadcaster, alongside independent production companies. The station has 3% of the audience share in Wales, which is similar to that of TG4 of Ireland. Up until the digital switchover in March 2010, a bilingual analogue service was broadcast consisting of S4C and Channel 4 programming.

=== Other television services ===
S4C's Clic service (the Welsh counterpart of the BBC iPlayer) allows viewers to watch its programmes again - programmes are also available to watch via iPlayer.

S4C also offers specialist content for children through its Cyw service and for teenagers through its Hansh service.

The BBC offers Welsh-language commentary on a number of sporting events on BBC One Wales and BBC Two Wales using the red button feature on digital TV. Sky Sports also previously offered a similar service for Wales international football matches.

ITV Local offered Welsh-medium programmes produced by ITV Cymru Wales including Y Ddau Ffranc featuring Rhys Ifans and the current affairs programmes Y Byd ar Bedwar and Hacio. Following the demise of ITV Local, the website was relaunched as Y Dydd, but closed shortly afterwards.

== Radio ==
=== Radio stations entirely in Welsh ===
- BBC Radio Cymru broadcasts a range of news, current affairs, cultural, music and sports programming through the medium of Welsh for 18.5 hours a day. It is similar in size and operation to RTÉ Raidió na Gaeltachta. The station simulcasts English-language output from BBC World Service during overnight hours after closedown.
- BBC Radio Cymru 2 broadcasts shows aimed at a younger audience. Although at least 50% of the music must be broadcast in Welsh, the station also plays music in English to attract younger audiences.
- Cymru FM, an online community station broadcasting exclusively in Welsh.
- Radio Beca produces occasional online Welsh programming – the station was initially due to broadcast on FM full-time in Ceredigion, Pembrokeshire and Carmarthenshire but lost its community radio licence in June 2015.

=== Bilingual radio stations ===
- Môn FM, a community radio station serving Anglesey and north Gwynedd, broadcasts around 90 hours a week of Welsh, English and bilingual programming.
- Radio Sudd, an alternative music station which broadcasts in Welsh and English.

=== Radio stations with daily programmes in Welsh ===
- GTFM, a community radio station in Pontypridd, airs Welsh-medium programmes on Tuesday and Sunday evenings and Saturday mornings with a daily news bulletin in Welsh from BBC Radio Cymru.

=== Radio stations with weekly programmes in Welsh ===
- BRfm, a community radio station in Brynmawr, broadcasts an hour-long Welsh programme on Monday afternoons.
- Radio Carmarthenshire and Radio Pembrokeshire broadcast a joint hour-long Welsh programme on Sunday nights.
- Radio Tircoed, a community radio station in the Swansea Valley, broadcasts a Welsh programme on Monday evenings.
- Sound Radio, a community radio station in the Vale of Clwyd, broadcasts a Welsh language music show on Monday evenings.
- Storm FM, the student radio station for Bangor University, broadcasts weekly news, music and entertainment programmes in Welsh.
- Radio Chubut, a community radio station in Argentina, has an hour of Welsh language discussion every Friday afternoon.

== Printed media ==
=== Newspapers and magazines ===
- Y Cymro – a monthly newspaper
- Golwg – a weekly news and current affairs magazine.
- Barn – a monthly current affairs magazine
- Y Faner Newydd – an independent magazine focusing on such topics as broadcasting, literature, history, art, science, and current affairs
- Cara - A magazine aimed at female readers.
- Y Selar - a music magazine.
- Hanes Byw - a magazine focusing on history.
- Lingo Newydd - a bi-monthly magazine aimed at learners of Welsh.

Plans for a daily Welsh-language newspaper, Y Byd, were abandoned owing to insufficient funding.

=== Daily newspapers with Welsh-medium content ===
- Western Mail, National newspaper with regular Welsh-medium columns
- Daily Post, North Wales newspaper with regular Welsh-medium columns and weekly pull-out section.

=== Weekly newspapers with Welsh-medium content ===
- Tivy Side in south Ceredigion
- Cambrian News various editions along west coast
- Carmarthen Journal covering most of Carmarthenshire
- South Wales Guardian has a weekly two-page spread in Welsh covering the Amman, Gwendraeth and Tywi Valleys.
- The Pembrokeshire Herald has a weekly two-page spread of Welsh language news, mainly on Welsh current affairs.

=== Weekly Welsh-medium local newspapers ===
- Y Cyfnod – covering the Bala area
- Y Dydd – covering the Dolgellau area

=== Monthly Welsh-medium community newsletters ===
(Known as papurau bro in Welsh)

- Yr Angor – Aberystwyth, Comins Coch, Llanbadarn Fawr, Penparcau and Waunfawr, Ceredigion
- Yr Angor – Merseyside
- Yr Arwydd – Mynydd Bodafon area, Anglesey
- Y Barcud – Tregaron area, Ceredigion
- Y Bedol – Ruthin area, Denbighshire
- Y Bigwn – Denbigh
- Y Blewyn Glas – Bro Ddyfi, Machynlleth, Powys
- Y Cardi Bach – Whitland and St Clears, Carmarthenshire
- Y Clawdd – Wrexham area
- Clebran – Crymych, Pembrokeshire
- Clecs Camwy - Trelew & Gaiman, Chubut, Argentina
- Clecs y Cwm a'r Dref – Neath area
- Clochdar – Cynon Valley, Aberdare, Rhondda Cynon Taff
- Clonc – Lampeter area
- Cwlwm – Carmarthen
- Dail Dysynni – Dysynni Valley, Tywyn, Gwynedd
- Dan y Landsker – South Pembrokeshire
- Y Dinesydd – Cardiff area
- Y Ddolen – Ystwyth to Wyre valleys, Aberystwyth, Ceredigion
- Eco'r Wyddfa – Llanrug, Llanberis and Deiniolen communities, Gwynedd
- Y Fan a'r Lle – Brecon area
- Y Ffynnon – Eifionydd, Garndolbenmaen, Gwynedd
- Y Gadlas – The area between the Conwy River and River Clwyd
- Y Gambo – South west Ceredigion
- Y Garthen – Teifi Valley, Ceredigion
- Y Glannau – Clwyd Coast and St Asaph area
- Glo Man – Aman Valley, Carmarthenshire
- Y Gloran – The head of the Rhondda, Ton Pentre, Rhondda
- Y Glorian – Llangefni area, Anglesey
- Y Goriad – Bangor and Felinheli
- Yr Hogwr – Bridgend area
- Llafar Bro – Blaenau Ffestiniog area, Gwynedd
- Llais – Swansea Valley, Swansea
- Llais Aeron – Aeron Valley, Ceredigion
- Llais Ardudwy – Ardudwy, Gwynedd
- Llais Ogwan – Ogwen Valley, Bethesda, Gwynedd
- Llais yr Andes - Esquel & Trevelin, Chubut Province, Argentina
- Llanw Llŷn – Llŷn Peninsula, Pwllheli, Gwynedd
- Lleu – Nantlle Valley, Caernarfon
- Y Llien Gwyn – Fishguard area, Pembrokeshire
- Y Lloffwr – Dinefwr area, Carmarthenshire
- Nene – Ponciau, Penycae, Johnstown and Rhosllannerchrugog, Wrexham
- Yr Odyn – Nant Conwy, Llanrwst, Conwy
- Papur Dre – Caernarfon, Gwynedd
- Papur Fama – Mold area, Flintshire
- Papur Menai – The banks of the Menai from Penmon to Dwyran, Anglesey
- Papur Pawb – Tal-y-bont, Taliesin and Tre'r Ddol, Ceredigion
- Papur y Cwm – The Gwendraeth, Llanelli, Carmarthenshire
- Y Pentan – Conwy Valley and coastal area of Conwy
- Pethe Penllyn – Bala area, Gwynedd
- Plu'r Gweunydd – Y Foel, Llangadfan, Llanerfyl, Llanfair Caereinion, Adfa, Cefn Coch, Llwydiarth, Llangynyw, Dolanog, Rhiwhiraeth, Pontrobert, Meifod and Welshpool, Powys
- Y Rhwyd – North west Anglesey
- Seren Hafren – Newtown area, Powys
- Sosbanelli – Llanelli
- Tafod Elái – Taff Ely, Pontypridd Gwefan Tafod Elai
- Tafod Tafwys – For Welsh learners in London
- Y Tincer – Genau'r Glyn, Llangorwen, Tirymynach, Trefeurig and Borth, Aberystwyth, Ceredigion
- Tua'r Goleuni – Rhymni Valley, Caerphilly
- Wilia – Swansea area
- Yr Wylan – Penrhyndeudraeth, Porthmadog, Beddgelert areas, Gwynedd
- Yr Ysgub – Ceiriog, Tanat and Cain valleys, Powys

=== Specialist publications ===
- Addysgydd, a monthly Welsh children's periodical published during 1823
- Barddas – bimonthly publication on poetry
- Bore Da – Urdd Gobaith Cymru magazine for primary school Welsh learners
- Cadwyn – magazine for Welsh learners
- Y Casglwr – for bibliophiles.
- Cip – for Welsh-speakers of primary school age
- Cristion – publication on Christian faith
- Cyfrwng – Media Wales Journal
- Y Cylchgrawn Efengylaidd – evangelical magazine
- Lol – satirical magazine published annually on Eisteddfod week
- Yr Enfys – journal of Undeb Cymru a’r Byd (Wales International Union)
- Fferm a Thyddyn – on agricultural history
- Gair y Dydd – daily devotional reading published four times a year
- Y Gwyliedydd -bimonthly magazine by the Welsh Wesleyan Methodists
- Iaw! – bimonthly for Welsh learners by Urdd Gobaith Cymru
- Lingo Newydd – bimonthly for Welsh learners
- Llafar Gwlad – a magazine on country life, customs and folklore
- Y Llan – Church in Wales journal
- Llên Cymru academic journal by the University of Wales Press
- Y Naturiaethwr – a magazine on the natural world
- Y Papur Gwyrdd – ecological magazine
- Y Selar, quarterly magazine on the Welsh language music scene
- Y Tafod, bimonthly Cymdeithas yr Iaith Gymraeg magazine
- Taliesin – literary magazine [link refers to article on the early poet with this name]
- Y Traethodydd – Wales' oldest magazine (est. 1845)
- Tu Chwith – art magazine aimed at a younger demographic
- Y Wawr – publication of Merched y Wawr (Welsh equivalent of WI)
- Wcw a'i Ffrindiau – aimed at children

== Internet ==
A considerable number of websites are now available in Welsh or bilingually. Notable examples include:

- Golwg360 (external link), Golwg's Welsh language news site
- BBC Cymru's Welsh language news site
- maes-e, a popular discussion forum (Welsh only)
- Newyddion S4C Welsh language news service.

Popular internet sites such as Google, Facebook and Wikipedia (known as Wicipedia in Welsh) are also available in Welsh. Most Welsh public bodies and a number of private sector companies in Wales have bilingual websites.

== Computer games ==
There is a growing demand in Welsh medium computer games, here are a few listed;

- Shooty fruity
- Marvin
- Anifaeliad
- Alto's Adventure
- Master reboot
- Talesinger: Voice of the Dragon

On 21 Apr 2016, Konami released the first Welsh language video games cover for Pro Evolution Soccer 2016 as a free download for owners of the game.

== Mobile phone technology ==
In August 2009, the mobile phone maker Samsung (with provider Orange) unveiled a new Welsh language mobile phone to be available from September 2009, which would include Welsh language predictive text and menus.

In June 2016 RWG Mobile launched the first Welsh based, bilingual (Welsh/English) mobile phone service for people who lives in Wales, in July 2016 the company promoted their service at the Royal Welsh Show.

== Software ==
Microsoft software such as Windows 7, Windows XP, Windows Vista, and Microsoft Office are available with Welsh language interfaces. There is also a Welsh spell check facility available on most Microsoft Office programmes.

Free software available in Welsh include OpenOffice.org, Mozilla Firefox, To Bach and uTorrent.

Bangor University has developed Cysgliad, a software pack containing Cysill, a Welsh spelling and grammar checker, and Cysgair, a Welsh-English dictionary.

== Publishers ==
A number of publishing companies exist that publish mainly through the medium of Welsh including:

- Gomer Press based in Llandysul, Ceredigion.
- Y Lolfa based in Talybont, Ceredigion.
- Gwasg Carreg Gwalch based in Llanrwst, Conwy
- Gwasg Cyhoeddiadau Modern Cymreig based in Allerton, Liverpool.
- Gwasg Gwynedd based in Caernarfon, Gwynedd.
- Gwasg y Dref Wen based in Cardiff.

== Record labels ==
A number of record labels release Welsh language music including:

- Anhrefn Records, based in Llanfair Caereinion, was active in releasing underground Welsh language music from 1983 to 1990.
- Ankst, an underground label at its most productive in the late 1980s and 90s.
- Copa, a sub-label – more youth orientated – of Sain.
- Docrad, based in Cardiff.
- Fflach, based in Cardigan, Ceredigion.
- Gwynfryn Cymunedol, based in Caernarfon, Gwynedd.
- Placid Casual, a Cardiff-based label owned by the Super Furry Animals.
- Rasp, a sub-label of Fflach.
- Sain, based in Llandwrog, Gwynedd – the largest Welsh-medium record company.
- Slacyr based in Garndolbenmaen.

A number of bands also release material on their own labels such as Frizbee's Recordiau Cosh and Bryn Fôn's laBelaBel.

== Films ==
Some Welsh-medium films have had success overseas, most notably Hedd Wyn and Solomon a Gaenor, both nominated for Oscars in the 1990s.

== DVD and video releases ==
A limited number of Welsh-medium videos and DVDs are sold, especially children's TV programmes such as Sali Mali, Tecwyn y Tractor, and a Welsh version of Bob the Builder (Bob y Bildar). Other popular DVDs include the comedy C'mon Midffîld!, with a series of ten DVDs being released, and the 1980s children's TV programme Syr Wynff a Plwmsan, which achieved cult status.
