= Media in Cardiff =

As the capital of Wales, media in Cardiff plays a large role in the city and nationwide. Employment in the sector has grown significantly in recent years, and currently provides employment for 2.1% of the city's workforce – higher than the level across Wales (1.1%) and marginally lower than that across Great Britain as a whole (2.2%).

== History ==
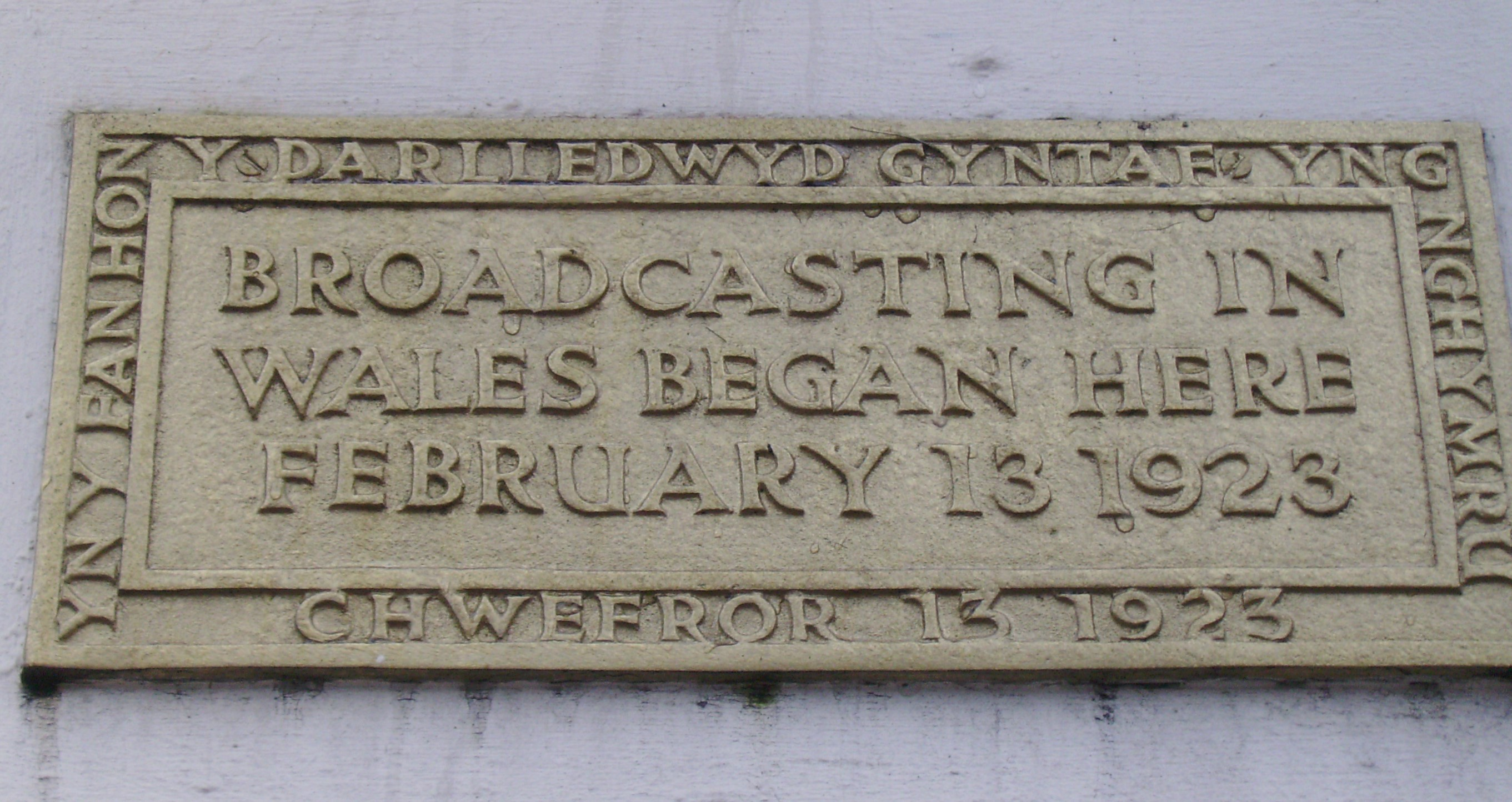
Plaque commemorating the first (radio) broadcast in Wales on 13 February 1923

At 5pm on 13 February 1923, 5WA Cardiff, a forerunner of BBC Radio Wales, first broadcast from a music shop at 19 Castle Street in Cardiff city centre. Later that evening at 9.30pm Mostyn Thomas, sang Dafydd y Garreg Wen, which was the first Welsh language song to be broadcast. A commemorative plaque records the event. 5WA Cardiff was a radio service which began broadcasting on 13 February 1923 and ended on 27 May 1933.

== Press ==
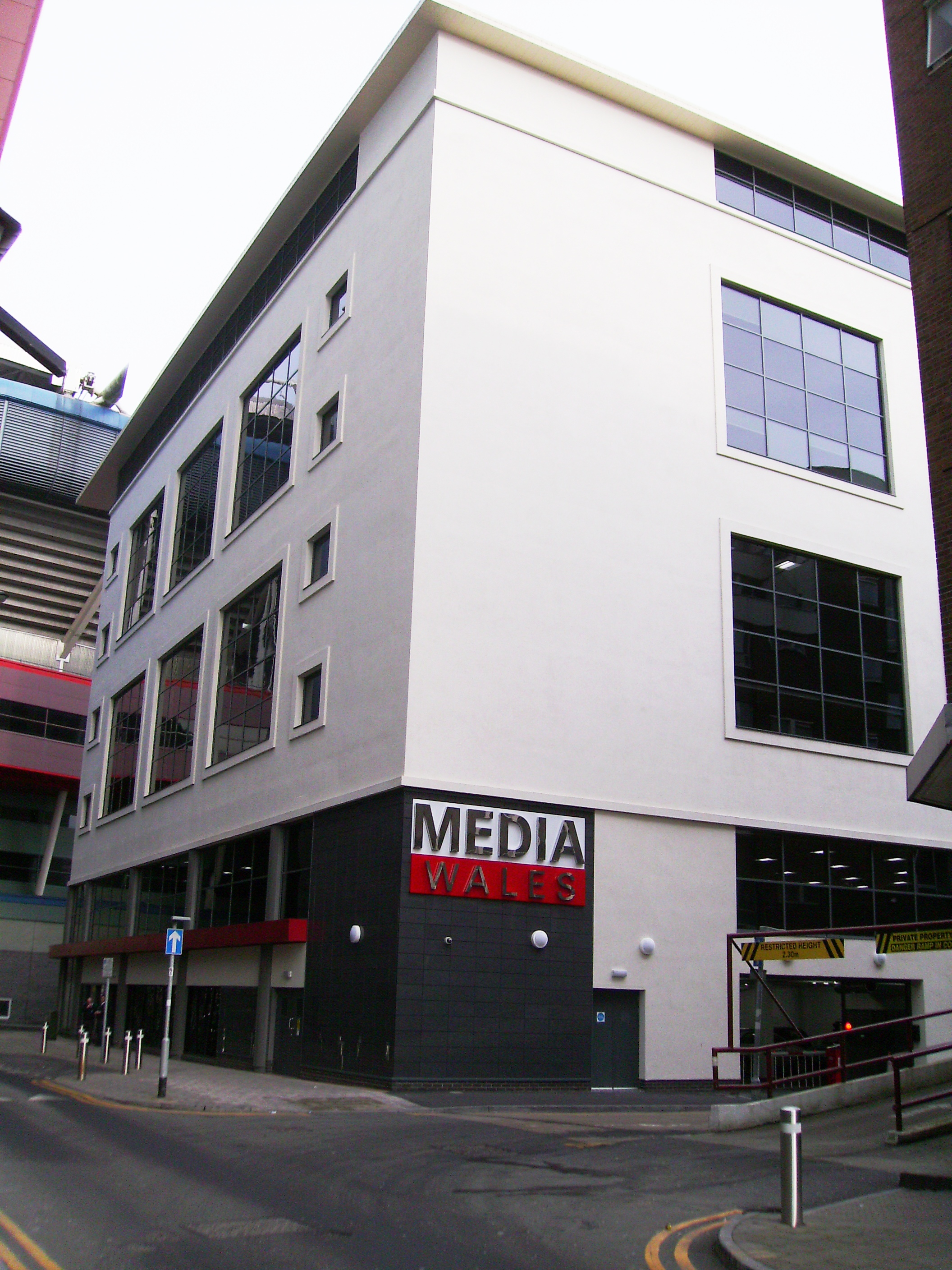
Six Park Street, offices of the South Wales Echo and Western Mail

Cardiff's daily tabloid newspaper is the South Wales Echo, founded in 1884 and formerly based in Thomson House, now in 6 Park Street in the city centre. The South Wales Echo is published in Cardiff and distributed throughout the surrounding area. It has a circulation of 3,175. The national newspapers, the Western Mail and Wales on Sunday, are also based in Thomson House as all are owned by Trinity Mirror. The Western Mail has a daily circulation of about 3,720.

The Cardiff edition of Metro is available daily on public transport in the city and around South Wales. Both the South Wales Echo and Metro publish daily information for the city such as the weather and entertainment listings.

The Times Educational Supplement Cymru is based in the city, but the paper itself is printed in England.

Gair Rhydd is the award-winning newspaper published by the students of Cardiff University and is available free in the Cardiff University Students' Union.

Cardiff County Council publishes the monthly Capital Times, and the Echo Extra is delivered free to homes. The Welsh language newspaper Y Dinesydd (or Papur Bro) is published monthly for the city. Additionally, all British daily newspapers are widely available in the city.

Magazines based in the capital include Jazz UK, Buzz magazine and Primary Times

== Television ==
All of Wales' national broadcasters are based in Cardiff. BBC Cymru Wales used to have its headquarters at, the now largely demolished, Broadcasting House in Llandaff while ITV Cymru Wales is based near the Senedd in Cardiff Bay and the Welsh language broadcaster S4C broadcasts from Llanishen.

In addition, a local television channel for the city, Made in Cardiff, is based in offices at St Mary's Street in the city centre. An analogue local TV channel, Capital TV, broadcast as a low-power RSL analogue station from 2002 to 2009.

The city also has its own Ofcom-licensed local digital television spectrum, owned by Cube Interactive.

== Radio ==
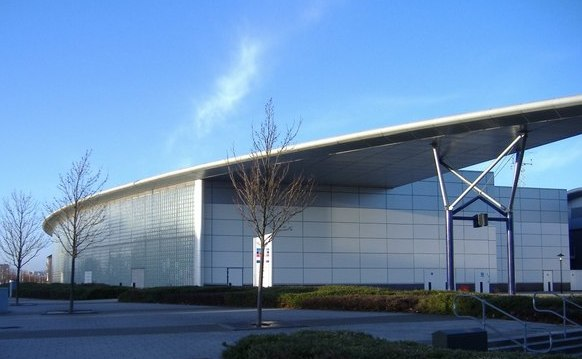
The Red Dragon Centre contains the studios of Capital FM, Heart and Smooth.

As the national broadcaster, BBC Cymru Wales, used to broadcast BBC Radio Wales (103.9 FM) and BBC Radio Cymru (96.8 FM) on various frequencies across Wales from Broadcasting House in Llandaff.

Cardiff's principal commercial radio stations are Capital South Wales (103.2 FM), Heart South Wales (105.4 FM) and Smooth Wales (DAB); all three of which originate local programming from studios at the Red Dragon Centre in Cardiff Bay.

Radio Cardiff (98.7 FM) is a community station based in the Butetown area and Radio Glamorgan broadcasts to the University Hospital of Wales in Heath.

Student radio station Tequila Radio broadcasts from the University of South Wales's ATRiuM Campus and Xpress Radio originates from Cardiff University Students' Union.

== Other institutions ==
The Cardiff School of Journalism, Media and Cultural Studies is based at Cardiff University. The Atrium building houses most of the Cardiff School of Creative and Cultural Industries faculty (CCI for short) of the University of South Wales.

== Use in media ==
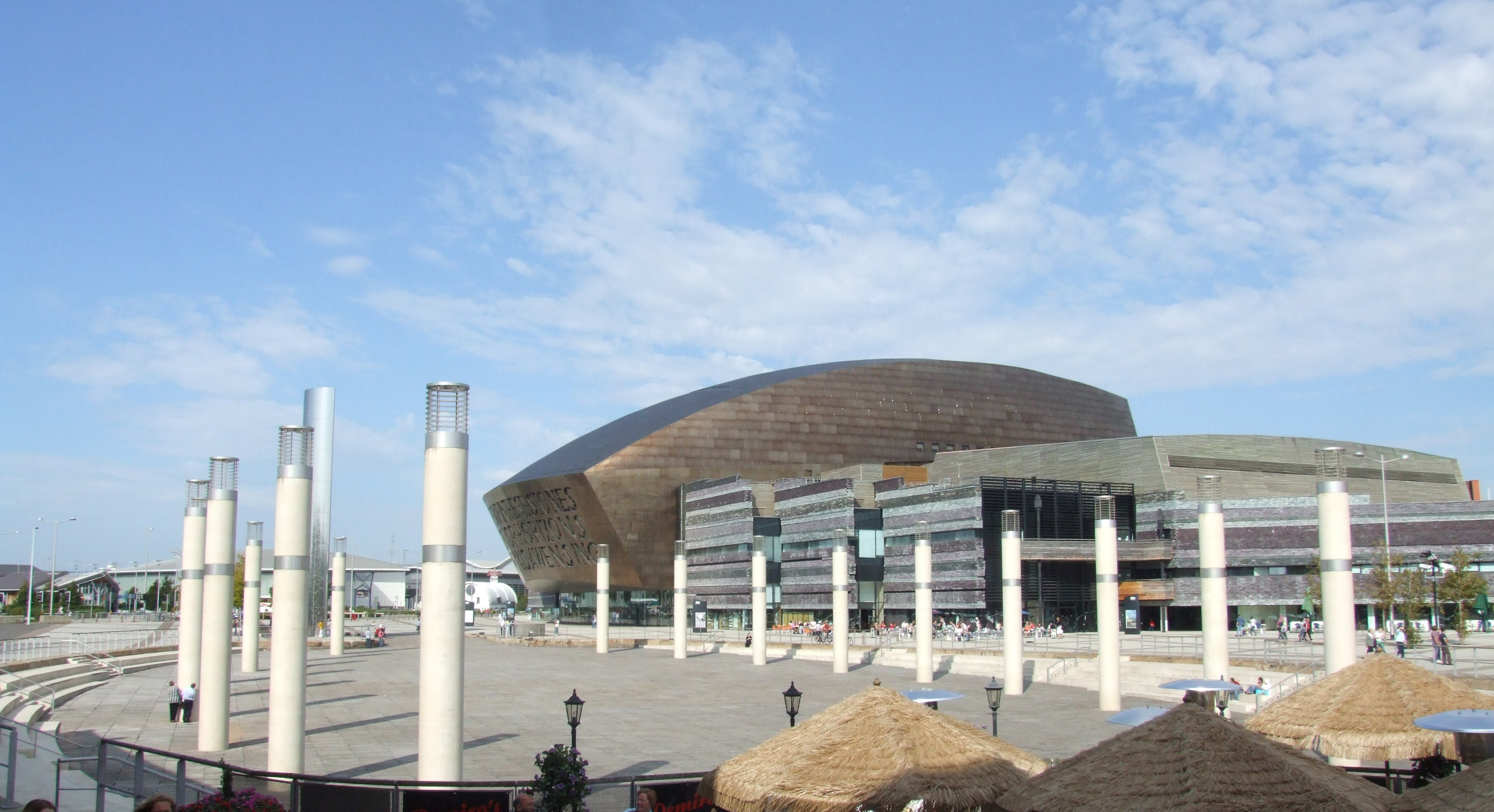
Roald Dahl Plass, outside the Millennium Centre, acts as the exterior of the hub in the series Torchwood

Cardiff is the filming location and/or setting for many mainstream television programmes such as Doctor Who and its spin-offs, Torchwood and The Sarah Jane Adventures, Class (2016 TV series), Merlin (TV series), Gavin & Stacey, The Story of Tracy Beaker (TV series), His Dark Materials (TV series), Netflix's Sex Education (TV series), Caerdydd and Pobl y Cwm, and for films such as Human Traffic, The Englishman Who Went Up a Hill But Came Down a Mountain, Infinite (film) and 28 Weeks Later. It is also referenced in Mars Attacks!

It was announced on 15 October 2008 that the BBC is to move the filming shows such as Casualty and Crimewatch to studios in Cardiff. and confirmed on 27 March 2009 that filming would be begin in 2011.

In 2010, Cardiff was used for filming of a contemporary update of Arthur Conan Doyle's Sherlock Holmes in Sherlock, and for a remake of Upstairs, Downstairs.

In 2012, Cardiff was the filming location of new MTV reality show The Valleys. The reality caused controversy and Welsh viewers were angered with the way the Welsh were stereotyped. The reality show takes young hopefuls from The Valleys and move them to Cardiff to pursue their dream careers. The show also shows the cast binge drinking, fighting, having casual sex and revealing themselves.

The BBC Two quiz Only Connect is produced in Cardiff.

== See also ==
- BBC Wales Drama Village
- Cardiff
- Wales
- Media in Wales
- BBC Wales headquarters building
