= Alas =

Alas! is an interjection used to express regret, sorrow, or grief.

Alas may also refer to:

== Music ==
- Alas (American band), progressive metal band from USA
- Alas (Argentine band), a mid-1970s Argentine progressive rock band

== Organizations ==
- ALAS Foundation or Fundacion América Latina en Acción Solidaria, an organization dedicated to children living in poverty in Latin America
- Artificial Limb & Appliance Service, an organisation providing support, equipment and rehabilitation to people with limb impairment

== Places ==
- Alas (East Timor), a town in Alas Administrative Post (formerly Subdistrict)
- Alas (Sumbawa), a town and administrative district of Sumbawa Regency, on Sumbawa Island
- Alàs, a village in the municipality of Alàs i Cerc, Catalonia, Spain
- Alas, Iran, a village in North Khorasan Province, Iran
- Alas Administrative Post, Manufahi District, East Timor
- Alas Islands, part of Papua New Guinea
- the Alas Strait in the Lesser Sunda Islands separates Lombok from Sumbawa island.

== Science ==
- Alas (geography), a steep-sided depression that is formed by the melting of ice and sometimes contains a lake
- 5-aminolevulinate synthase, an enzyme expressed in eukaryotes in two forms: ALAS1 and ALAS2
- Aluminium arsenide or AlAs, a semiconductor material

== Other ==
- Alas people, an ethnic group in Aceh, Indonesia
- Alas language, an Austronesian language of Sumatra
- Alas River, a river of Aceh, Indonesia
- Alas!, an 1890 work of literature by Rhoda Broughton
- ALAS (missile), a Serbian long-range ground attack missile
- Alas (surname)
- Alternative for Social Advance, a Colombian political party
