= Hospital 24/7 =

BBC medical documentary television series

- Also known as: Hospital 24/7 Revisited
- Genre: Reality television
- Narrated by: Jonathan Owen
- Country of origin: United Kingdom
- Original language: English
- No. of seasons: 3
- No. of episodes: 12

Production
- Producer: Samantha Rosie
- Production locations: Cardiff, Wales
- Production company: BBC Cymru Wales

Original release
- Network: BBC One
- Release: 2009 – 2011

Hospital 24/7 is a medical documentary series broadcast in the United Kingdom on BBC One.

Filmed at the University Hospital of Wales in Cardiff, Wales, the third biggest hospital in the UK, the series follows the professional dramas at the hospital, portrays the real-life sagas of the people who work there and shows some of the biggest challenges facing the NHS.

== Series ==
Series one (2009)

The first series was filmed for a week in autumn 2008, and aired on four nights from 12 to 15 January 2009

Series two (2010)

Filming continued in summer 2010 and three episodes of Hospital 24/7 Revisited were broadcast in August to follow up stories from the first series.

Series three (2011)

The third series was filmed in early 2010, and aired on five consecutive nights for a week from 10 January 2011.

It featured the story of a hill walker airlifted to the emergency department after collapsing in a remote location, and a man about to undergo surgery to remove one of his kidneys, which will be transplanted to his mother. The week-long story features singer Charlotte Church, patron of the Noah's Ark Appeal to raise money for the nearby Children's Hospital for Wales, who reveals she was once one of the recipients of the hospital's care herself.

== Characters ==
- A&E Doctor: Dr Matt Morgan
- Waste Officer: Neil Meredith – one of the hospital's 15 waste collectors
- Housekeeper: Richard Harwood – one of the hospital's 200 housekeepers
- Paediatric Surgeon: Simon Huddart
- Chef: Francine Jeremy – one of the hospital's 32 cooking staff
- Patient Access Nurse – Carly Edwards

== See also ==
- University Hospital of Wales
- Noah's Ark Children's Hospital for Wales
- Noah's Ark Appeal
- Media in Cardiff
