= Broadcasting House (disambiguation) =

Broadcasting House is the headquarters of the BBC, in Portland Place and Langham Place, London

Broadcasting House may also refer to:

== Buildings occupied by the British Broadcasting Corporation ==
- Broadcasting House, Cardiff, former the headquarters of BBC Wales
- Broadcasting House, Belfast, the headquarters of BBC Northern Ireland
- Broadcasting House, Bangor, BBC Wales premises in Bangor, Wales
- Broadcasting House, Bristol, the headquarters of the BBC West region
- Broadcasting House, Ipswich, the home of BBC Radio Suffolk
- Broadcasting House, Leeds, the former headquarters of BBC Yorkshire
- Broadcasting House, Northampton, the home of BBC Radio Northampton
- Broadcasting House, Plymouth, the headquarters of the BBC South West region
- Broadcasting House, Southampton, the headquarters of the BBC South region
- Broadcasting House, Edinburgh, BBC Scotland former premises in Edinburgh, now known as The Jam House
- Broadcasting House, Glasgow, BBC Scotland former premises in Glasgow
- BBC Cymru Wales New Broadcasting House (Cardiff), the headquarters of BBC Cymru Wales
- New Broadcasting House, Manchester, the former headquarters of the BBC North West region in Manchester
- Old Broadcasting House, the vacated headquarters of the BBC North region in Leeds, now part of Leeds Metropolitan University's School of Computing and Creative Technologies
- Broadcasting House, Jersey, original headquarters of BBC Radio Jersey

== Other broadcasting buildings ==
- Broadcasting House (Athens), a building at the Hellenic Broadcasting Corporation headquarters
- Broadcasting House (Oslo), a building at the NRK headquarters
- Broadcasting House (RTHK), headquarters of Radio Television Hong Kong, New Kowloon
- Broadcasting House (Wellington), a former building used by Radio New Zealand
- Broadcast House, the name for the studios of WXYZ-TV in Detroit, Michigan
- Rediffusion House, a building housing Malta's Public Broadcasting Services
- Broadcasting House, the headquarters of Manx Radio in Douglas, Isle of Man.

== Radio programmes ==
- Broadcasting House (radio programme), a programme on BBC Radio 4
