= BYD =

BYD, byd, or Byd may refer to:

== Companies ==
- BYD Company, an automobile and rechargeable battery producer in China
  - BYD Auto, a subsidiary automobile manufacturer in China
- Boyd Gaming, a gaming and hospitality company (NYSE ticker symbol: BYD)

== Other uses ==
- Barley yellow dwarf, a plant disease caused by the barley yellow dwarf virus
- Barry Docks railway station (National Rail station code), Wales
- Beijing Youth Daily, a daily newspaper published in Beijing, China
- Y Byd, a Welsh-language newspaper
- Bury Your Dead, American rock band

== See also ==
- Byrd (disambiguation)
- Boyd (disambiguation)
- Beyond (disambiguation)
