= Zaheer Yousef =

British cardiologist and academic

Zaheer Yousef OBE, FRCP
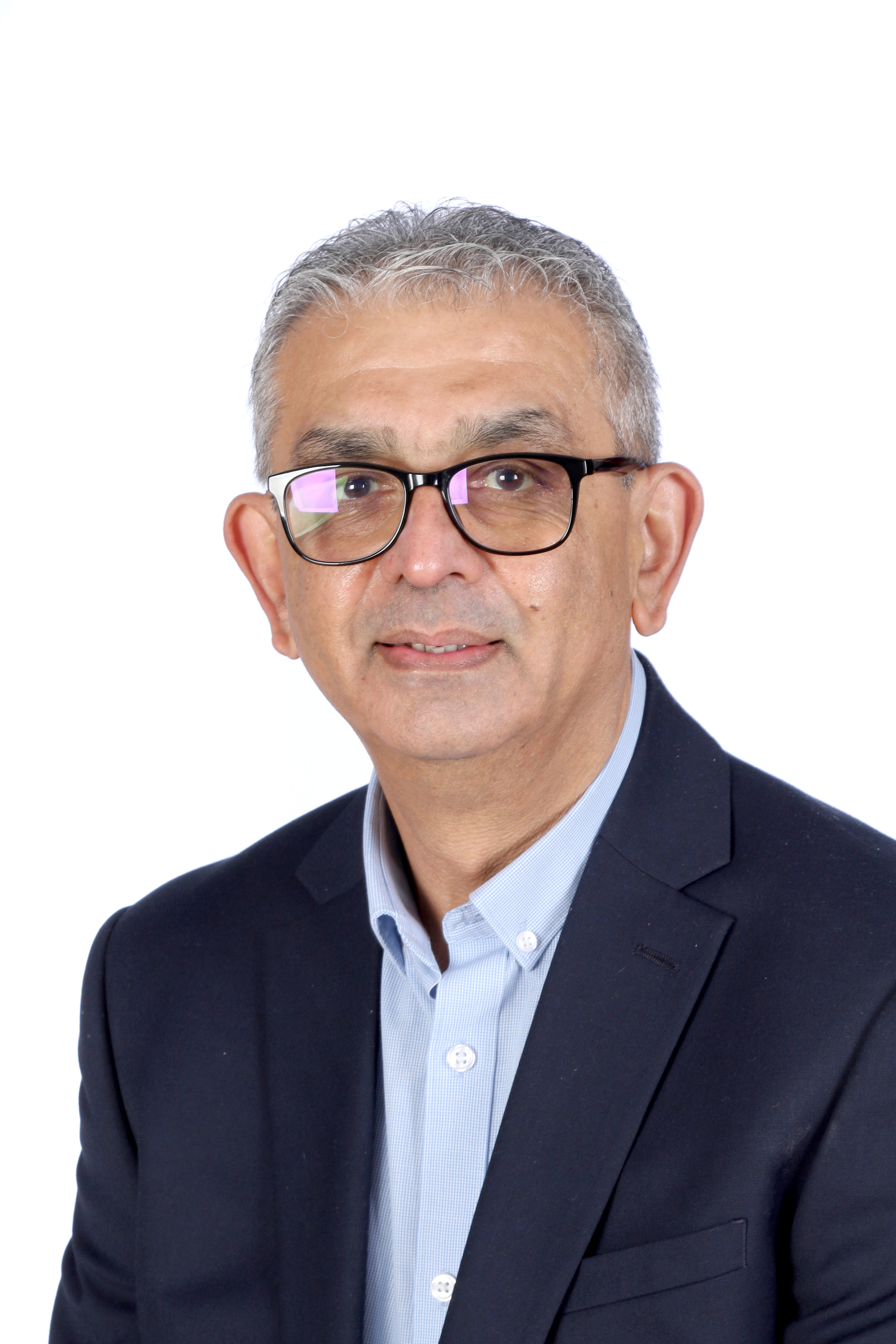
- Born: Zaheer Raza Yousef; Bukoba, Tanzania
- Education: Guy’s Hospital, University of London
- Known for: Heart failure treatment; cardiac resynchronisation therapy; cardiovascular device research
- Scientific career
- Fields: Cardiology; heart failure
- Workplaces: University Hospital of Wales; Cardiff University

Zaheer Raza Yousef is a British cardiologist and academic known for his contributions to the treatment of heart failure, cardiac resynchronisation therapy, cardiac device research, and humanitarian work. He is Consultant Cardiologist and Lead Clinician for Heart Muscle Diseases and Heart Failure Devices at the University Hospital of Wales and Honorary Professor at Cardiff University.

== Education ==
Yousef earned a Bachelor of Science degree (immunology) with first-class honours in 1988 and a Bachelor of Medicine, Bachelor of Surgery (MBBS) degree in 1992 from Guy’s Hospital (University of London). He completed a Doctor of Medicine (MD) in 2003 at St Thomas’ Hospital (University of London), focusing on post-infarction ventricular remodelling.

== Career ==
Yousef was appointed Consultant Cardiologist at the University Hospital of Wales in 2005, where he leads services in heart failure, heart muscle disease, and cardiac resynchronisation. He is Honorary Professor at Cardiff University and serves as Clinical Lead for Cardiovascular Research in Wales.

He has held leadership roles with the Welsh Cardiovascular Society and Heart Research Wales.

== Academic and research work ==
Yousef's academic interests focus on the pathophysiology of heart muscle diseases and the mechanisms of therapeutic interventions. His work includes clinical and imaging-based research on cardiac resynchronisation, chemotherapy-induced cardiomyopathy, and heart failure with preserved ejection fraction. His studies use echocardiography, cardiac MRI, and haemodynamic assessment to investigate novel treatment pathways.

== Charitable work ==
Yousef is a founding member of the Africa-HF course, which offers bespoke post-graduate training in heart failure to African healthcare professionals. He also runs regular pacemaker training workshops throughout sub-Saharan Africa, promoting the use of refurbished pacemakers to improve affordable access to device therapy in low- and middle-income countries.

== Selected publications ==
- Yousef ZR et al. “Late intervention after anterior myocardial infarction: effects on left ventricular size, function, and quality of life.” Journal of the American College of Cardiology, 2002.
- Mullens W, Auricchio A, Yousef Z et al. “Optimized implementation of cardiac resynchronization therapy.” Europace, 2021.
- Bonny A, Chin A, Yousef Z et al. “Cardiac pacing in Sub-Saharan Africa.” Cardiovascular Journal of Africa, 2019.
- Yousef Z et al. “Left ventricular hypertrophy in Fabry disease: a practical approach to diagnosis.” European Heart Journal, 2013.
- Malhotra A, Dhutia H, Yousef Z et al. “Outcomes of Cardiac Screening in Adolescent Soccer Players.” New England Journal of Medicine, 2018.
- Wunderly K, Yousef Z et al. “Using reconditioned pacemakers to treat bradycardia in Africa.” Nature Reviews Cardiology, 2018.
- Russell SJ, Tan C, O’Keefe P, Ashraf S, Zaidi A, Fraser AG, Yousef ZR. “Optimised temporary biventricular pacing improves haemodynamic function after on-pump cardiac surgery in patients with severe left ventricular systolic dysfunction.” European Journal of Cardio-Thoracic Surgery, 2012.

== Awards and honours ==
- 2025 – Officer of the Order of the British Empire in the 2025 New Year Honours for services to the treatment of heart failure
- 2009 – Fellow of the Royal College of Physicians
- 2006 – European Society of Cardiology (Fellow)
