= Journal of Medical Engineering & Technology =

- Discipline: Medical engineering
- Language: English
- Edited by: John P. Woodcock

Publication details
- History: 1977-present
- Publisher: Taylor & Francis
- Frequency: 8/year
- Open access: Hybrid

Standard abbreviations
- ISO 4: J. Med. Eng. Technol.

Indexing
- CODEN: JMTEDN
- ISSN: 0309-1902 (print); 1464-522X (web)
- LCCN: 77646778
- OCLC no.: 960788543

Links
- Journal homepage; Online access; Online archive

The Journal of Medical Engineering & Technology is a peer-reviewed medical journal covering medical engineering and related subjects. It is published by Taylor & Francis and the editor -in-chief is John P. Woodcock (University Hospital of Wales). The journal is abstracted and indexed in Scopus.
