= U.tv =

Website of itv.com in Northern Ireland

u.tv
- Website type: Portal
- Owner: ITV plc
- Creator: UTV
- Website: www.u.tv
- Commercial: Yes
- Registration: No
- Launched: 1 June 2000; 26 years ago
- Current status: Offline since 6 June 2016

The URL u.tv was the address of the main website of UTV, the Northern Irish ITV franchise holder. The website offered news, sport and entertainment news and was also home to the companies ISP services. As result of the takeover of UTV by ITV plc, The u.tv website closed in June 2016, and all of the latest news and weather and programme catch up from UTV moved into itv.com.

== UTV Internet ==
UTV Internet was an Internet service provider owned by UTV Media plc, through which they provided broadband and dial-up internet packages. UTV operated this service in both Northern Ireland, and the Republic. Although they did not target internet subscribers outside the island of Ireland, the dial-up service was also available in Great Britain. The service was sold in 2014 to Rainbow Communications.

== See also ==
- itv.com
- stv.tv
