= ALAC =

ALAC may refer to:

- Alcohol Advisory Council of New Zealand, autonomous Crown entity for promoting alcohol moderation
- Aluminium acetate (AlAc), a number of different salts of aluminum with acetic acid
- Apple Lossless Audio Codec, an audio coding format
- Artificial Limb & Appliance Centres, facilities managed by the NHS Wales organisation Artificial Limb & Appliance Service
- At-Large Advisory Committee, an advisory committee to ICANN
