= New Zealand Parliament Buildings =

Government complex in Wellington, New Zealand

Coordinates: 41°16′41″S 174°46′37″E

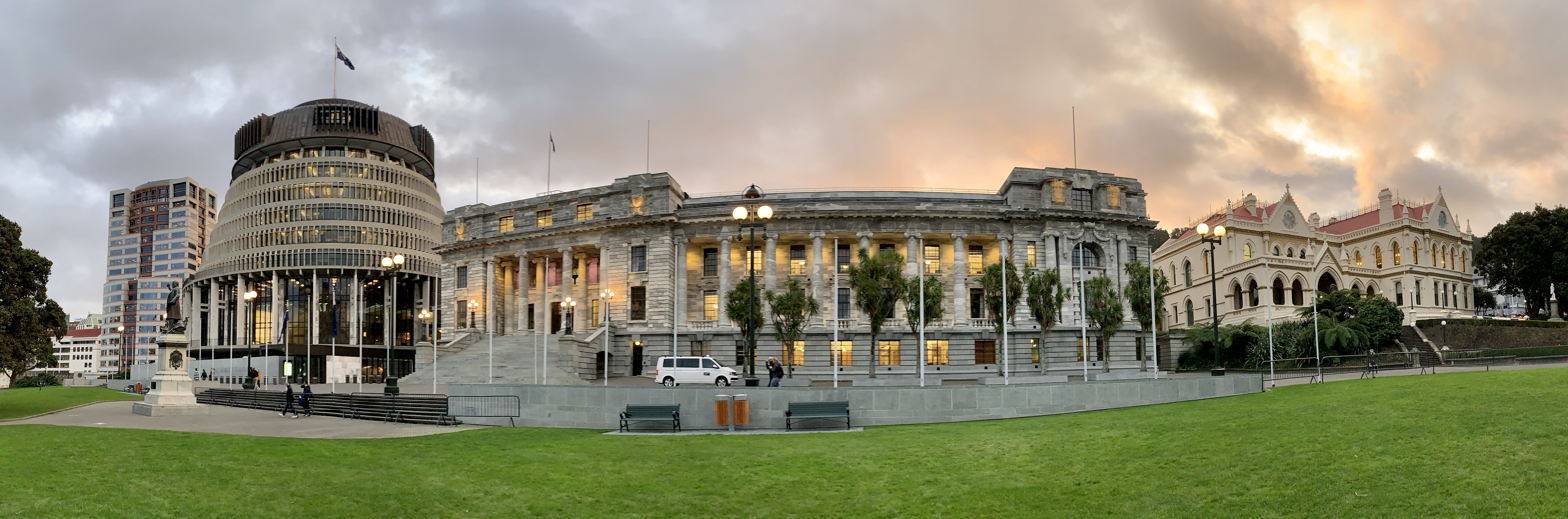
Left to right: Bowen House, the Beehive (Executive Wing), Parliament House and the Parliamentary Library

The New Zealand Parliament Buildings house the New Zealand Parliament and are on a 45,000 square metre site at the northern end of Lambton Quay, Wellington. From north to south, they are the Parliamentary Library building (1899); the Edwardian neoclassical-style Parliament House (1922); the executive wing, called "The Beehive" (1977); and Bowen House (in use since 1991). Currently, an additional building for housing Members of Parliament is under construction, which is expected to be completed in 2027. Whilst most of the individual buildings are outstanding for different reasons, the overall setting that has been achieved "has little aesthetic or architectural coherence".

== Parliament House ==
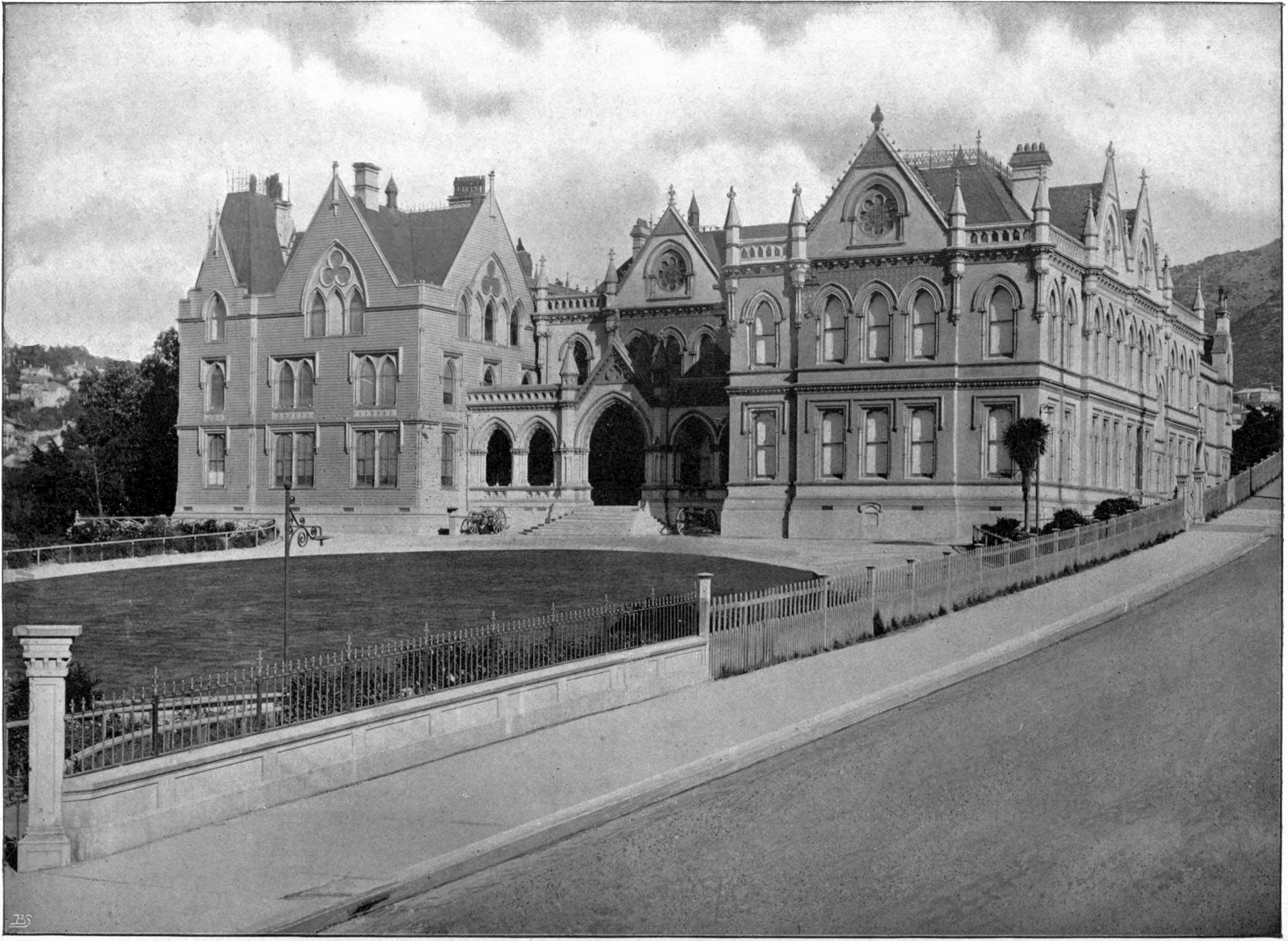
The former building (the left wing) in 1906

The main building of the complex is Parliament House, containing the debating chamber, speaker's office, visitors' centre, and committee rooms.

=== Predecessor building ===
The first Parliament (then called the "General Assembly") was housed in the wooden two storey Provincial Council Building (1870s addition by William Clayton). It was replaced by the 1880s three-storey Gothic Revival building by Thomas Turnbull) and containing many indigenous timbers but was destroyed by fire in 1907 along with all other parliament buildings except the library. The library had an iron fire-door that saved its collections. Following the destruction of the building the Parliament occupied the adjacent Government House (where the Beehive now sits) for ten years.

=== Replacement building ===
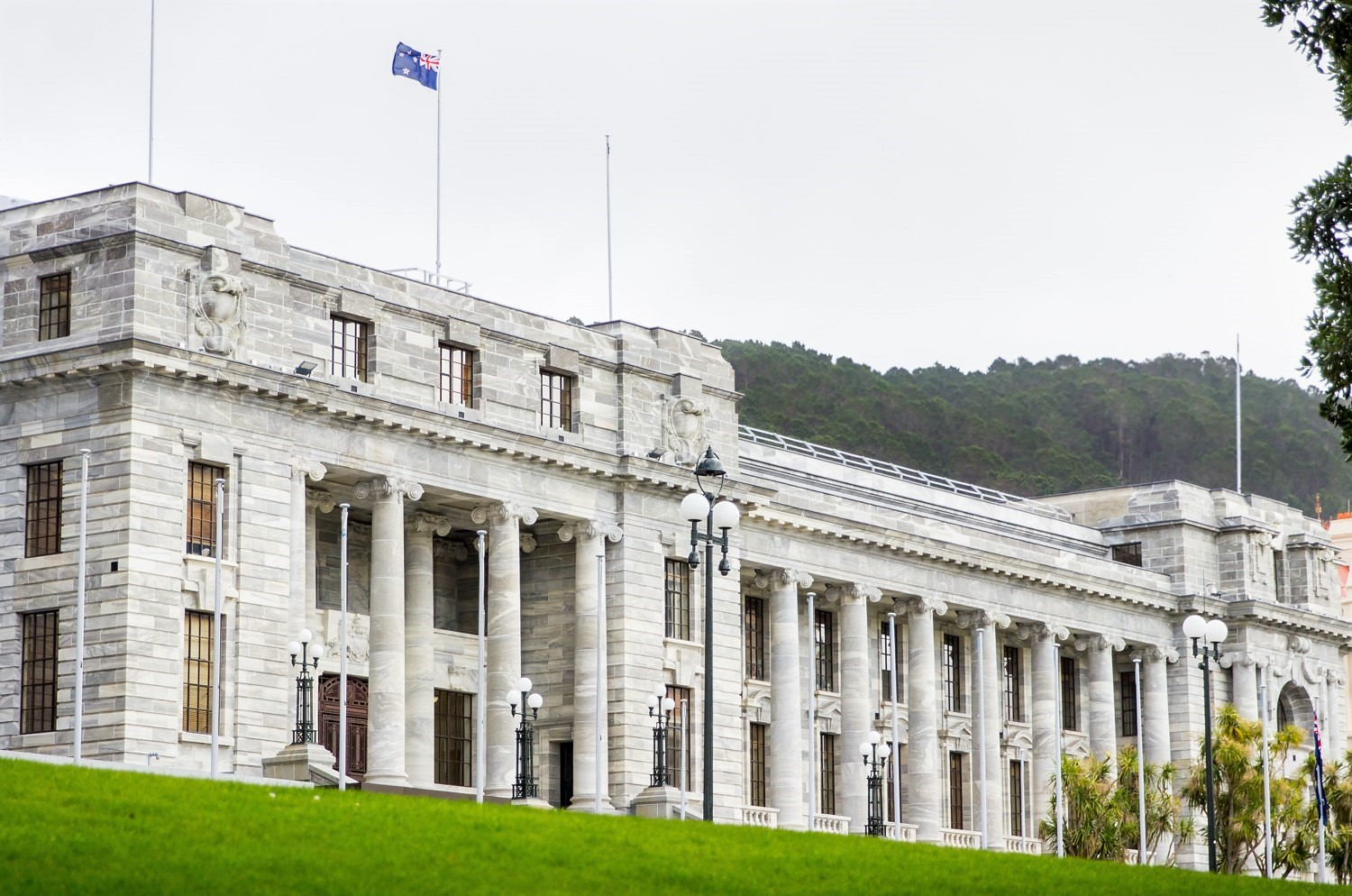
Parliament House, completed 1922

After the old building burnt down, a contest was created for the new parliament building, which was won by Government Architect John Campbell. His design was divided into two stages. The first half, a Neoclassical building, contained both chambers and the second half Bellamy's (the parliamentary dining facility) and a new Gothic Revival library to replace the existing one.

Despite cost concerns, Prime Minister William Massey let construction of the first stage begin in 1914, but without much of the roof ornamentation or the roof domes. The outbreak of World War I created labour and material shortages that made construction difficult. However, members of Parliament (MPs) were so desperate to get out of the run-down old Government House that they moved into the unfinished building in 1918. In 1922, the first stage was completed (the second stage was never built). Beginning in 1992, extensive work was undertaken to strengthen the building. Parliament House was finally officially opened in 1995 by Elizabeth II, Queen of New Zealand, after its refurbishment. The intention of the Liberal Government was for the design to be implemented in stages, eventually resulting in a coherent architectural setting. Instead, as Heritage New Zealand remarks, the setting that has been achieved "has little aesthetic or architectural coherence", especially through the construction of the Beehive instead of completion of Parliament House.

In February 2022, many anti-COVID-19 vaccine mandate protestors converged outside Parliament House. They set up tents on the lawn, occupying the parliamentary precinct, and blockaded nearby Molesworth Street. The protestors were cleared by Police on 2 March, after nearly four weeks. The protestors set fires and caused damage to the lawns, and vandalised Parliament Buildings.

== Additional Parliament building ==
In 2022, then-Speaker of the House Trevor Mallard announced a new six-storey building complex behind Parliament House on Museum Street. It takes the place of what was formerly Parliament's carpark, and is designed to house MPs that can no longer be accommodated in the main building.

The complex is constructed out of wood to allow high earthquake resilience in combination with base isolation technology. It is set to be completed in early 2027.

== The Beehive ==
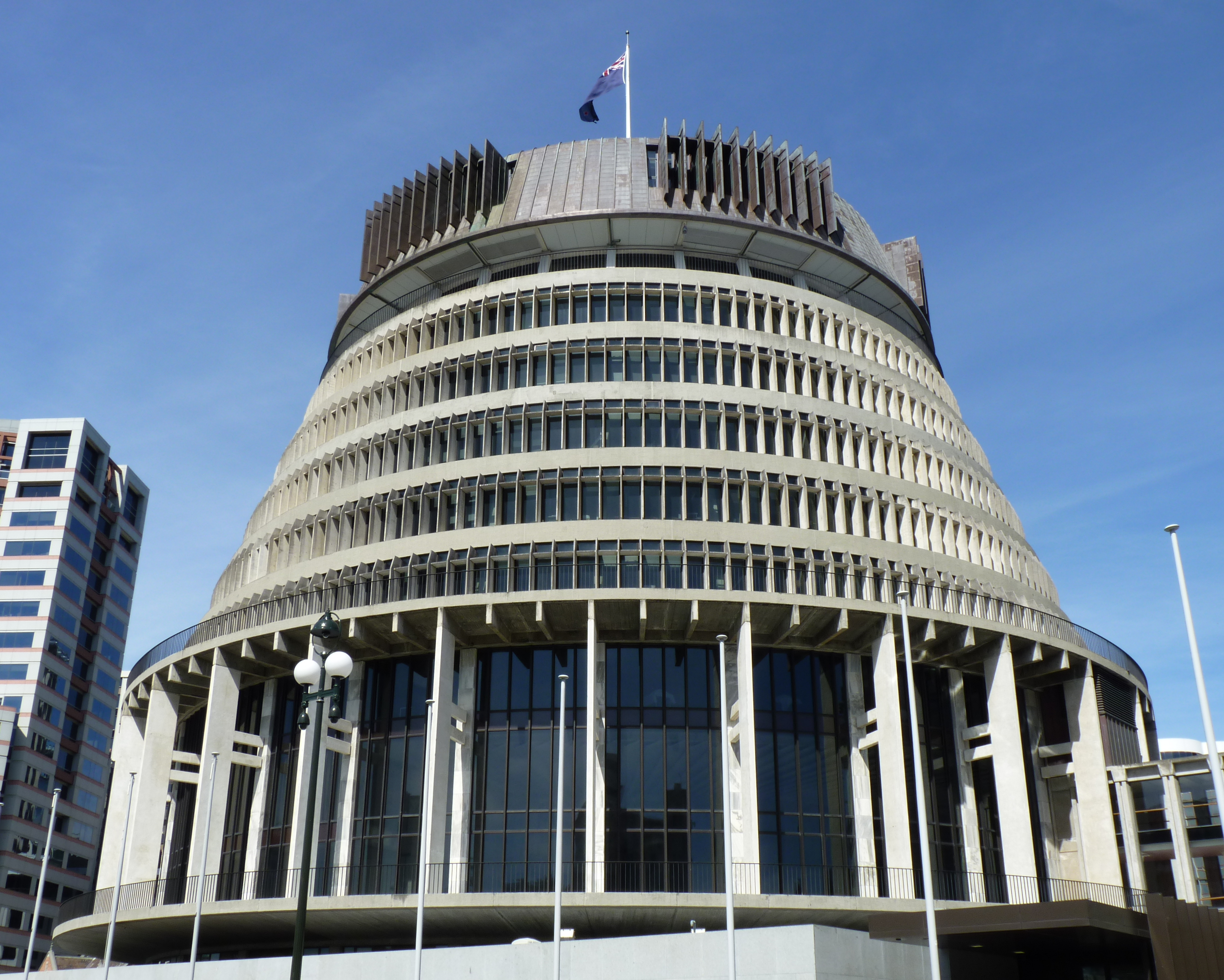
The Beehive, officially opened in 1977

The land intended for the second stage of Parliament House is occupied by the Executive Wing. This building conceived by Scottish architect Sir Basil Spence in 1964, largely designed by the Ministry of Works, was officially opened by Queen Elizabeth II in 1977. The first parliamentary offices moved into the building in 1979. Due to its distinctive shape, it is referred to colloquially as "The Beehive".

The building is ten storeys and 72 metres (236 ft) high. The top floor is occupied by the Cabinet room, with the prime minister's office on the floor immediately below. The offices of individual ministers, various function rooms, and Bellamy's restaurant occupy the first three floors.

In the late 1990s there was consideration of moving the Beehive behind Parliament House, and finishing Parliament House according to the 1911 original plans. The plan was quickly scuttled due to a lack of public support and concerns about cost.

== Parliamentary Library ==
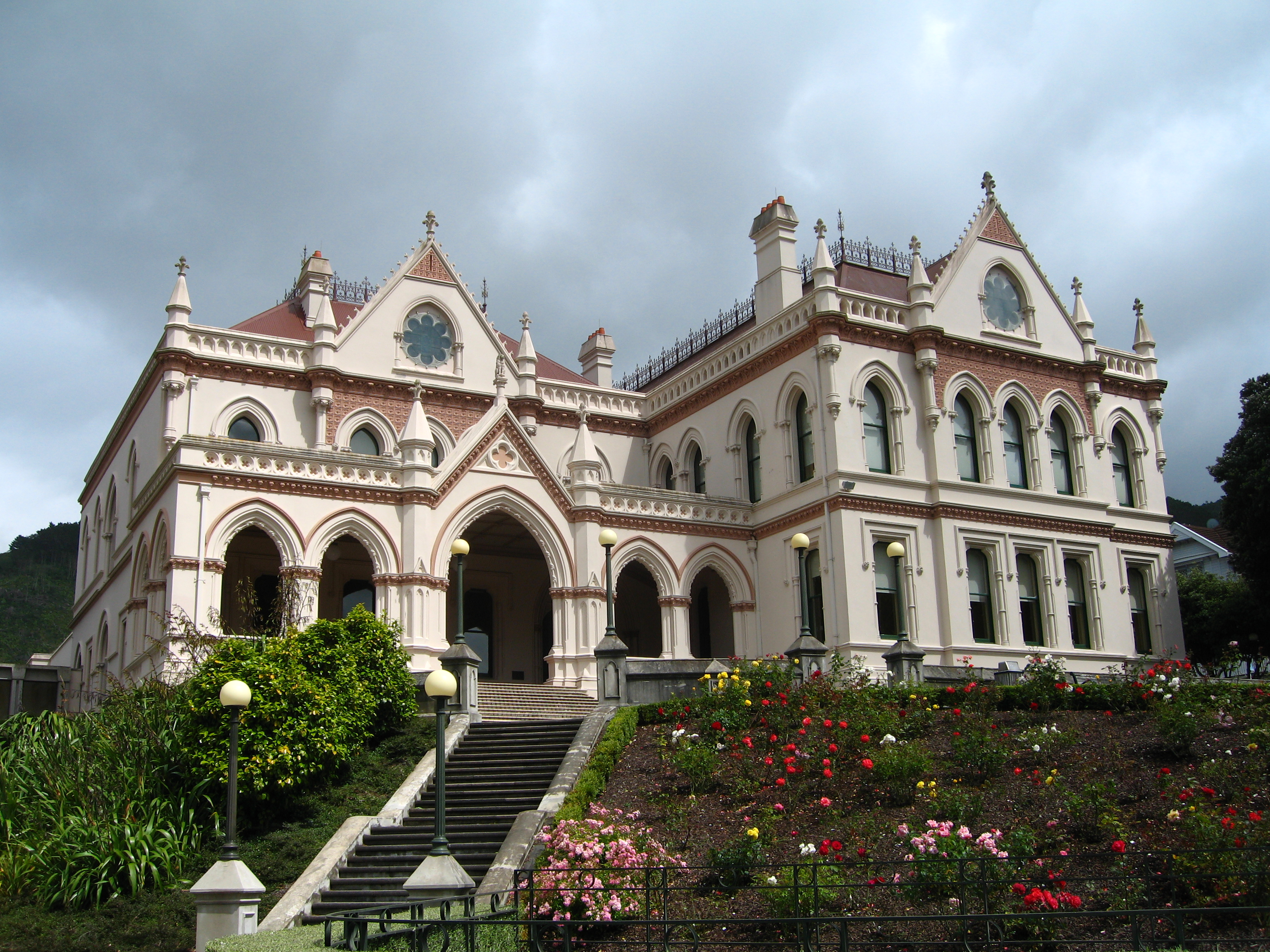
Parliamentary Library building

Completed in 1899, the Parliamentary Library is the oldest of the buildings. It stands to the north of Parliament House (to its right, looking from the front).

The library was designed in Gothic Revival style and was fire resistant, being constructed of masonry. The third storey of the design was not built, to save money. It had an iron fire-door separating the library from the main entrance section. This saved the library from the fire of 1907, which destroyed the rest of the timber parliament buildings.

Along with Parliament House, the library was strengthened and refurbished in the 1990s. This included recreating Gothic elements of the roof including ironwork, turrets and finials. It still houses Parliament's library. The building is registered with Heritage New Zealand (previously called the New Zealand Historic Places Trust) as a Category 1 heritage structure with registration number 217.

== Bowen House ==
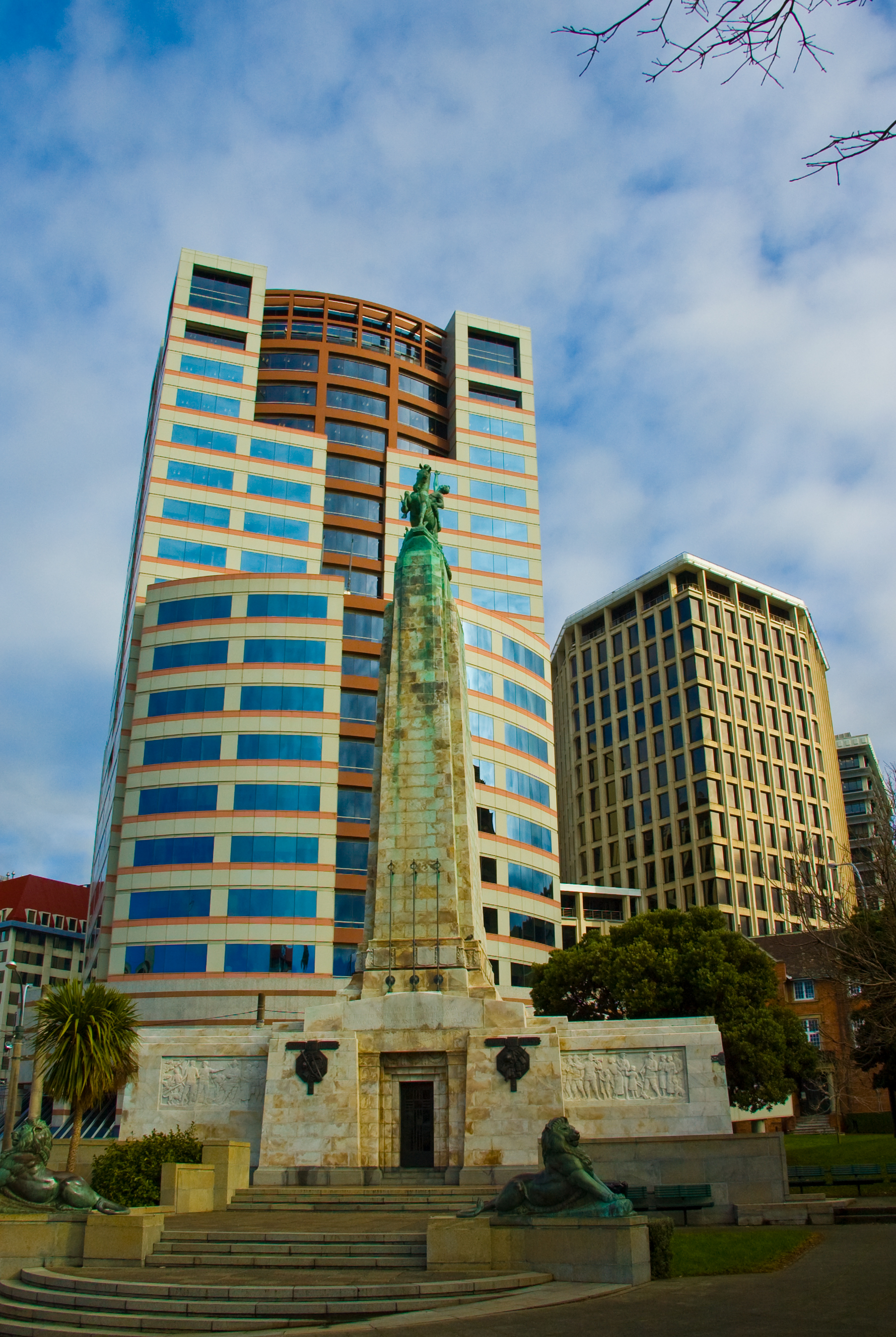
Bowen House, behind the Wellington Cenotaph

A 22-storey office building across Bowen Street from the Beehive, Bowen House formerly housed MPs' offices and support staff, and was leased by Parliamentary Services from 1991 to 2020. It is connected to the rest of the parliamentary complex by a tunnel under Bowen Street which contains a travelator.

== Old Government Buildings ==
Not part of the current parliamentary complex and on the other side of Lambton Quay, this four-storey building was designed by William Clayton and built in 1876. The former Government Buildings currently house Victoria University of Wellington's Law School as part of Victoria's Pipitea campus. Several rooms featuring displays of the building's history have been set up for public viewing.
