= Papur Bro =

A papur bro (local paper; plural papurau bro) is a Welsh-language local community newsletter, produced by volunteers and generally published monthly. The first such publication was Y Dinesydd, established in Cardiff in April 1973. There are currently 58 papurau bro, produced throughout Wales. With changing times and appetites, more modern, online versions of papurau bro have started to appear such as: Pobl Caerdydd (Cardiff), Pobl Aberystwyth, Pobl y Fro (Vale of Glamorgan) and Pobl Dinefwr.

During 2015–2016, papurau bro had a combined distribution of 66,808 copies each month.

At the National Eisteddfod 2012, in the Vale of Glamorgan, Leighton Andrews, the minister with responsibility for the Welsh language and digital media, called for more support for papurau bro:

"Papurau Bro are an important tradition in Wales, but for more people to turn towards new technology for their news, it is essential that they use these new means of communication. There are a number of opportunities available to assist the process of publishing Papurau Bro to move with the times, from design and typesetting to using Hyperlocal to promote them. A great deal of technology is available to make them accessible to a broader audience and to provide a place for new voices."

== See also ==
- List of Papurau Bro
