= Noah's Ark Children's Hospital for Wales =

Children's Hospital for Wales
- Cardiff and Vale University Health Board

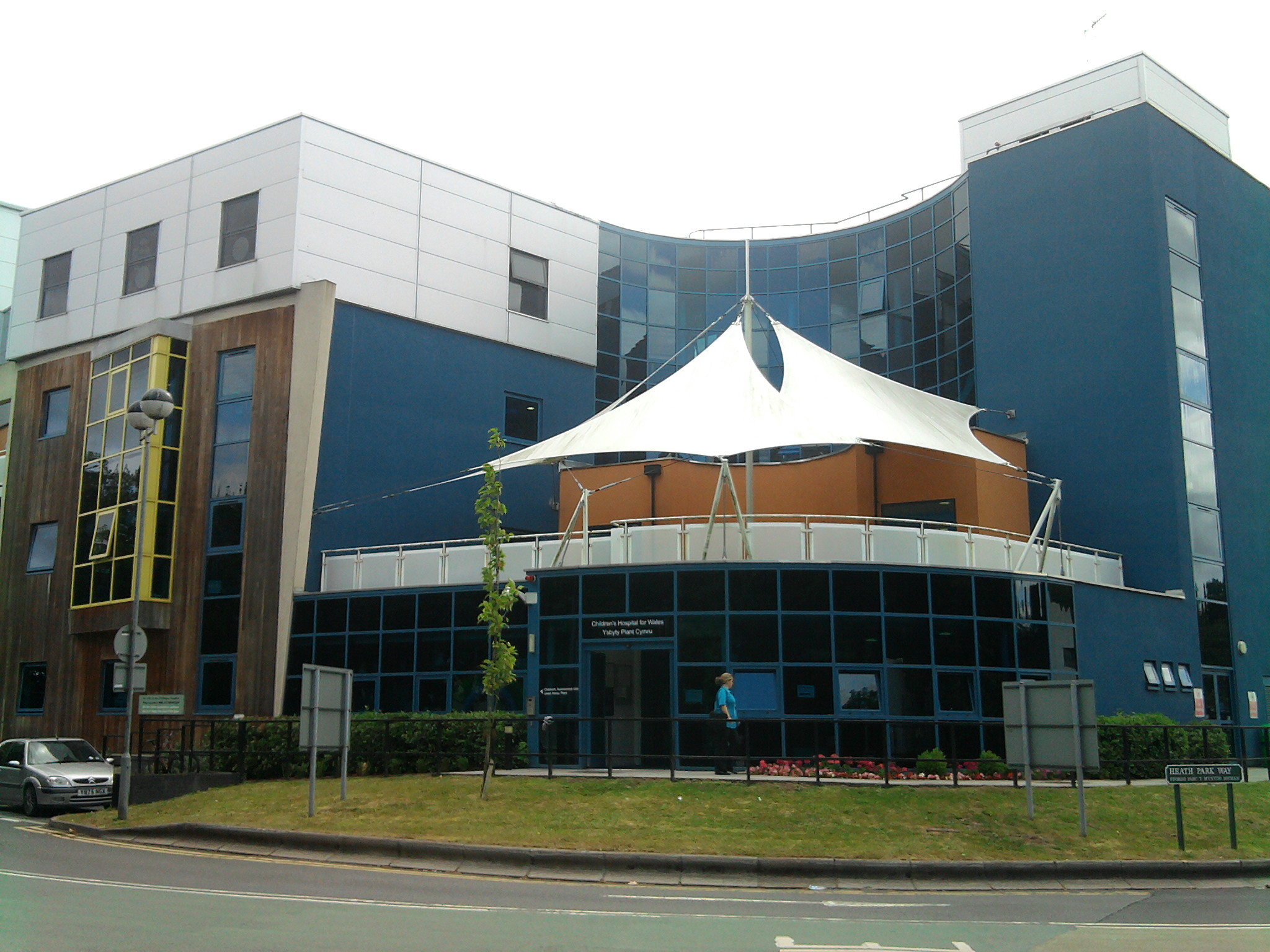
- Children's Hospital for Wales

- Shown in Cardiff

Geography
- Location: Heath, Cardiff, Wales
- Coordinates: 51.485°N 3.162°W

Organisation
- Care system: NHS
- Type: Children's hospital
- Affiliated university: Cardiff University

Services
- Emergency department: Yes
- Beds: 179

Helipads
- Helipad: Yes, in UHW

History
- Founded: 2005

Links
- Website: cavuhb.nhs.wales/hospitals-and-health-centres/our-hospitals/noahs-ark-childrens-hospital-for-wales/
- Lists: Hospitals in Wales

The Noah's Ark Children's Hospital for Wales (Welsh: Ysbyty Arch Noa Plant Cymru) is a children's hospital in Cardiff, Wales. It is situated on the site of the University Hospital of Wales in the Heath area of the city and is managed by the Cardiff and Vale University Health Board.

== History ==
The first phase of the hospital was financed from funds raised by the Noah's Ark Appeal, which had been founded in May 2000, together with some support from the Welsh Assembly Government. The appeal patrons included Dame Shirley Bassey, who was born in Cardiff, Charlotte Church and Catherine Zeta-Jones. The first phase, which was designed by Boyes Rees and built by Laing O'Rourke at a cost of £10 million, was officially opened by Catherine Zeta-Jones and Michael Douglas in June 2006.

In November 2007 Edwina Hart AM, the Health Minister of Wales, announced that the Welsh Assembly Government would fund that part of the capital costs for the second phase of the hospital which was not already being financed by the three local health boards and Health Commission Wales.

In June 2010 the playrooms at the hospital were restocked with new toys by city department store John Lewis after the South Wales Echo reported that the theft of toys threatened a playroom with closure.

Zeta-Jones and Douglas returned to the hospital to celebrate the 10th anniversary of the launch of the fundraising campaign in July 2010. Zeta-Jones announced in November 2012 that the hospital would become known as the Noah's Ark Children's Hospital for Wales.

The second phase of the hospital, which was designed by Boyes Rees and built by Interserve at a cost of £64 million, was opened by First Minister Carwyn Jones in May 2015. New facilities included five operating theatres, the new paediatric intensive care unit, a new hydrotherapy pool, and an "open" MRI scanner. The Royal College of Paediatrics and Child Health, as well as doctors at the hospital, have described the new facilities as "world class". In 2017, a play garden also opened in the second phase building.
