= Saba Park Services UK Limited =

Parking facilities company

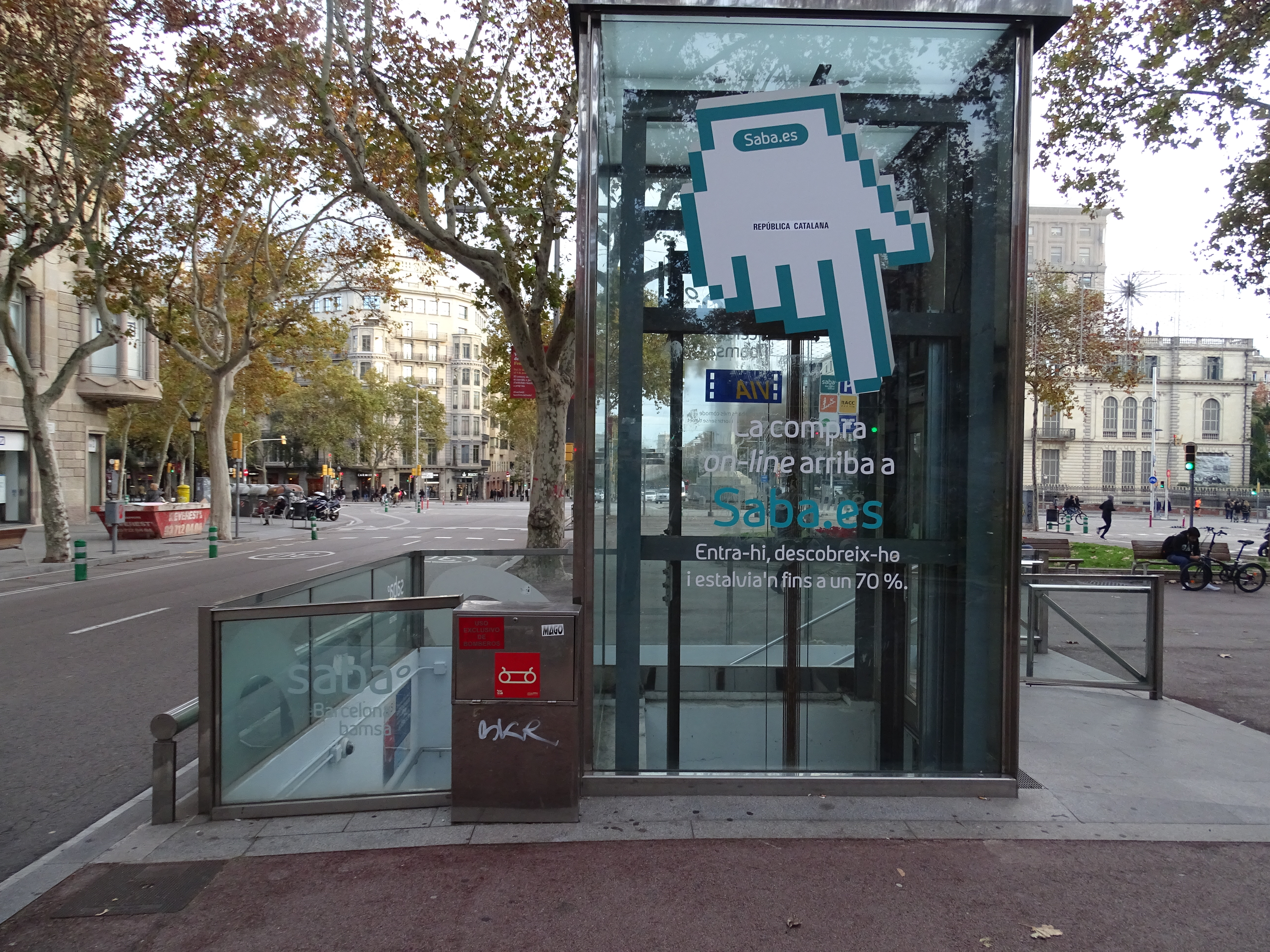
- Saba parking in Barcelona
- Industry: Transport industry
- Headquarters: Watford, England
- Operating income: €71 million (2016)
- Parent: Indigo Group S.A.S.
- Website: www.sabaparking.co.uk

Saba Park Services UK Limited, formerly known as Indigo Park Services UK Limited, is a parking facilities company based in Watford.

It is owned by Indigo Group S.A.S. That is owned 37% by Ardian, 37% by Crédit Agricole and 25% by Vinci SA. The parent company was offered for sale in February 2017 with the price expected to be around 3 billion euros. It operates a parking network in more than 500 cities and 17 countries with 530,000 parking spaces in the Iberian Peninsula, Britain and Turkey. Its earnings before interest, tax, depreciation and amortization were 71 million euros in 2016 on sales of 201 million euros.

== Operations ==
- University Hospital of Wales, Cardiff – a 15-year contract. It made a profit of £2.8 million in 2016 from this contract, from charges and fines. 80 staff who have been fined challenged the fines in court. The staff also claimed that just finding a space used up to an hour a day of their time and that their earnings may be insufficient to cover the fines. In July 2017 the doctors and nurses lost the case and were required to pay £128 per ticket issued, leading to a number of them handing in their notice. The hospital employs 6000 staff but only has 1800 parking spaces.
- Ninewells Hospital- a 30-year lease. Three nurses were ordered to pay the company more than £4,000 in September 2017 for a total of 30 unpaid fines at the hospital.
- Royal Cornwall Hospitals NHS Trust which it took over October 2022.
- Lister Hospital, Stevenage, UK.
- Transport for London car parks at London Overground, London Underground and Elizabeth line stations since January 2023.
