= Capital TV (Cardiff) =

Local TV channel in Cardiff, Wales

- Country: United Kingdom
- Broadcast area: Cardiff

Programming
- Picture format: 4:3 SDTV

Ownership
- Owner: Capital TV Ltd.

History
- Launched: September 2005
- Closed: 2008

Availability

Terrestrial
- Analogue UHF: Channel 49

Capital TV was the first local television channel covering Cardiff, the capital of Wales. The station broadcast exclusively on analogue television throughout its existence. The company was liquidated in 2010 after not securing a Freeview licence. The channel was led by Colin Voisey of Media4Creative, formerly head of film at HTV.

== History ==
The company was incorporated on 28 April 1998. By 2003, the channel was training staff for the possibility of a launch, with 24-year old Rahim Mustafa producing programmes to air if the channel was set to open. As early as 12 September 2005 it was already broadcasting with relays of QVC and Sky News and old films in the public domain. Colin Voisey was appointed director of the channel on 26 April 2006.Regular service started in November 2005 and provided coverage of local events.

Ofcom revoked its licence in March 2009. As there was no bid for a Freeview licence, the first round of local television licences was granted in 2012; the winner was Cube Interactive.
