= Health Commission Wales =

Health Commission Wales (Specialised Services) (HCW), was an executive agency of the Welsh Assembly Government, which was responsible for commissioning a defined range of specialised services in Wales from 2003 to 2010, including cardiac surgery, specialised neurosciences, and the Artificial Limb and Appliance Service. It was the successor to the Specialised Health Services Commission Wales (SHSCW), and was replaced by Welsh Health Specialised Services Committee (WHSSC) in April 2010
