= Alas (surname) =

Alas is a surname. Notable people with the surname include:

- Dennis Alas (born 1985), Salvadoran footballer
- Jaime Alas (born 1989), Salvadoran footballer
- José Inocencio Alas (born 1934), Salvadoran Roman Catholic priest
- Kevin Alas (born 1991), Filipino basketball player
- Leopoldo Alas (1852–1901), Spanish writer
- Louie Alas (born 1963), Filipino basketball coach

== See also ==
- Sibel Alaş (born 1973), Turkish singer
