= Artificial Limb and Appliance Service =

Impairment service of NHS Wales

The Artificial Limb and Appliance Service (ALAS; Welsh: Gwasanaeth Aelodau Artiffisial a Chyfarpar) of NHS Wales, provides support, equipment and rehabilitation to people with permanent or long-term impairment. It is commissioned by the NHS Wales Joint Commissioning Committee (previously the Welsh Health Specialised Services Committee and Health Commission Wales), and is provided through a consortium arrangement between three NHS Wales local health boards, with each hosting one centre. The three Artificial Limb and Appliance Centres (ALAC) are situated in:

- Cardiff at Rookwood Hospital (for South East Wales; part of the Cardiff and Vale University Health Board)
- Swansea at Morriston Hospital (for South West Wales; part of the Swansea Bay University Health Board)
- Wrexham at Wrexham Maelor Hospital (for North Wales; part of the Betsi Cadwaladr University Health Board)

The Cardiff and Wrexham sites also provide wheelchair services as of May 2010. Services are provided on a lifetime basis. By 2016, the Cardiff ALAC had 130 staff.

== History ==
The Artificial Limb and Appliance Service originated during the First World War. The War Office (precursor to the British Ministry of Defence) set up a service in Roehampton to deal with the needs of military amputees.

From the 1960s, the service had expanded and was operated by the UK Government's Department of Health and Social Security for a largely civilian population. By then, wheelchair supply and other related disablement services had been added to the remit. The majority of service users were elderly individuals who often had disabilities due to systemic medical conditions.

In 1984 the British government set up the McColl working party to review and report on the quality and management of disablement services in England. In 1986 it recommended a new management board should be set up to manage their efficiency and cost effectiveness. As a result, the Disablement Services Authority (DSA) was set up in England to manage the 49 Artificial Limb & Appliance Centres (ALACs) through regional and district health authorities by 1991. ALAC services were transferred to the National Health Service in England in July 1991.

After a period of consultation, it was agreed the Welsh Health Common Services Authority (WHCSA) should assume operational management responsibility for the services in April 1988. The Artificial Eye Service in Wales remained under Welsh Office management until it too was transferred to the WHCSA in 1993. At the time, it was agreed that the transfer should be for an interim period - April 1988 to April 1991. There would then be further consultation with the wider NHS in Wales.

In 1995 the Secretary of State decided that the management of ALAS should transfer to the University Hospital of Wales, Morriston and Wrexham
