= Addysgydd =

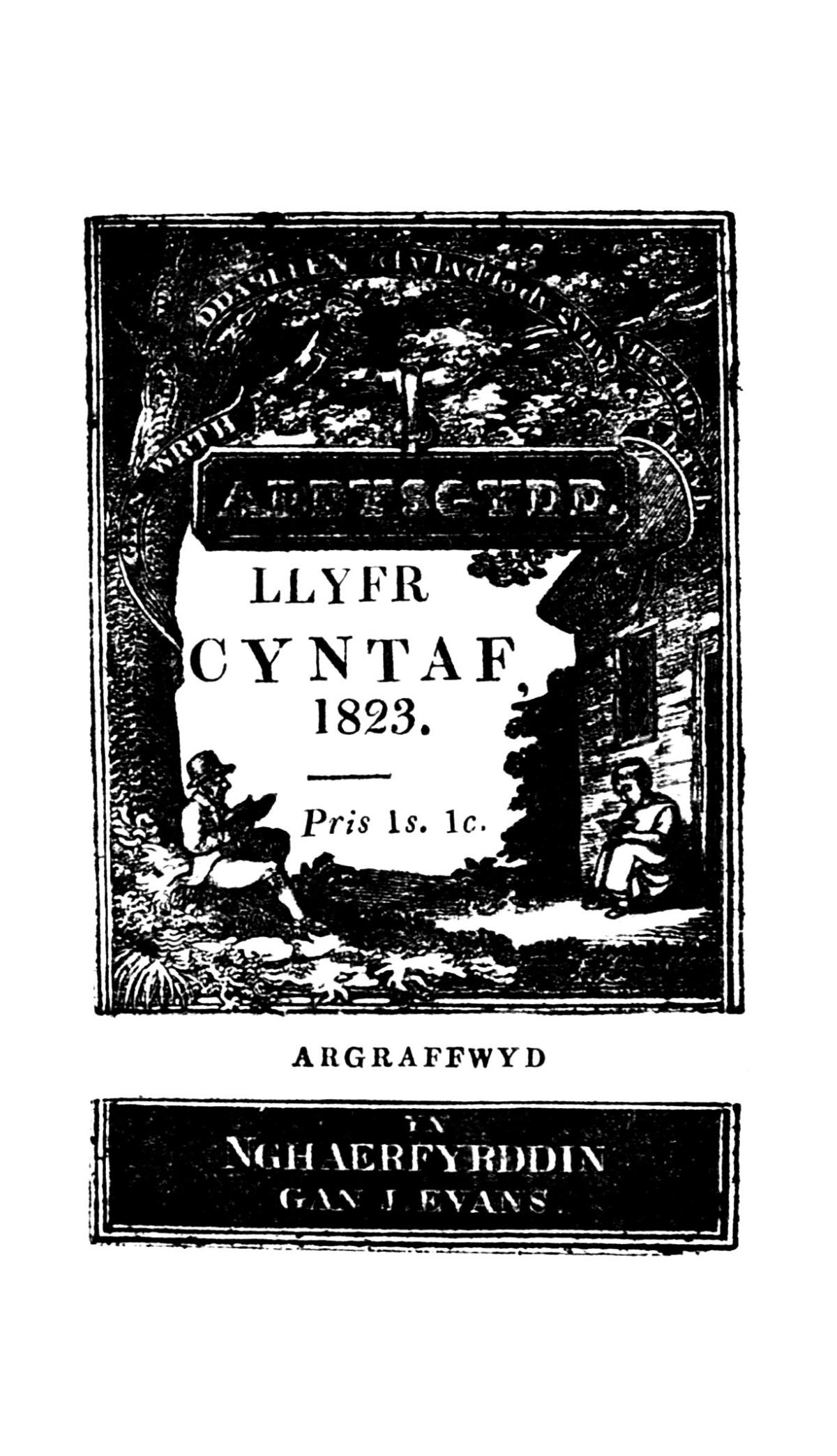
The cover of the first ever edition of Addysgydd in 1823

Addysgydd was a monthly Welsh language periodical published by J. Evans in Carmarthen, Wales during 1823. The periodical is an early example of a Welsh language children's periodical. It was aimed at the children and young people of the Sunday school in Carmarthen. The magazine was edited by the minister and hymn writer David Charles (1803–1880), and contains a number of his hymns. The subject matter of the Journal was largely concerned with religious education. It is thought to be the first Welsh language publication for children to contain illustrations of events from the Old Testament and the New Testament.
