= Itv.com =

Website for ITV plc

itv.com
- Website type: Portal
- Owner: ITV Consumer Limited (ITV plc)
- Creator: ITV
- Website: itv.com
- Commercial: Yes
- Registration: No
- Launched: 31 October 1994

itv.com is the main website of ITV plc, the UK's largest commercial television broadcaster which operates 13 out of 15 regions on the ITV network under the ITV1 brand. The website offers the ITVX streaming service, with sections for ITV News, certain ITV1 programmes and competitions. STV, which runs the only regions not owned by ITV plc, have their own separate website at stv.tv.

== History ==
ITV.com logo, used from 2006 to 2011

The URL 'www.itv.com' was created on 31 October 1994, but it was registered elsewhere for some years before Carlton and Granada bought the domain name after merging their respective online services, carlton.com and G-Wizz. These companies have since merged to form ITV plc. The original ITV URL was www.itv.co.uk, which now redirects to itv.com. itv.co.uk was and still is registered to the ITV Network Limited as opposed to ITV plc. Previous corporate logos had ".com" added as a logo for the Web site. However, this trend stopped with the 2011 redesign wherein a black ITV logo began being used when referring to the Web site. ITV.com's slogan used to be "total freedom of entertainment".

== Overview ==
=== 2007 redesign and video on demand ===
The 2007 redesign of the website featured a media player through which viewers gain access to whole shows, simulcasts, previews and catchups of broadcast content, much of it within a 30-day window, all for free for the viewer, funded by advertising. Users also have access to the network's programme archive, 'behind-the-scenes' programming, games and user-generated content. The site also makes available some 1,000 hours of exclusive archive content, which will grow over time. In addition, the site also introduces interactive services and community elements.

Soaps such as Coronation Street and Emmerdale were the first genre to launch on 12 June 2007, followed by Games on 19 June 2007, Drama and Best of ITV on 29 June 2007, Lifestyle on 9 July 2007, Entertainment on 17 July 2007, Sport on 25 July, with every other section launching on 31 July, making the site now fully launched. Also on 12 June 2007 simulcasts of ITV, ITV2, ITV3 and ITV4 were launched. (However, not all programming will be shown due to rights restrictions.)

In March 2008, the Web site was revamped with changes including the home page and the video player, with a new Catch Up TV section.

=== 2009–10 redesign ===
On 10 December 2008 it was announced that itv.com would undergo another redesign to introduce more social media features and a greater emphasis on its most popular TV shows with a "fewer, bigger, better" strategy. The redesign was code named 'Project Penguin', and it followed the announcement of ITV's Catch Up service being rebranded to ITV Player.

Parts of the site have already had a redesign, including a new look for the home page. The Coronation Street, Loose Women and football sections pages were updated in the early months of 2009. This Morning was relaunched in August. ITV News was relaunched 2010, coinciding with a new Tonight page. On 11 September 2009, video coding was changed from Microsoft Silverlight to Flash, and on 25 September 2009, ITV relaunched its TV classics section. On 19 November ITV Player had a complete overhaul of its site and relaunched with a new Web site with a few new addons, including a search bar, a light dimmer and bigger video players. A Brand New TV Shows directory was relaunched on 10 December, which then led to the old style Drama, Soap, Entertainment pages on the site being replaced with similar pages in the TV Shows directory. On 4 February a brand new weather page launched and on 22 February a brand new ITV News Web site launched. Stories from ITV News correspondents, the latest news programme, news blogs and a meet the team page are all on the brand new Web site. From Summer 2010, the ITV Web site underwent another overhaul, with tweaks to the layout such as centring pages when used on wide-screen displays as well as improved pages for various ITV shows with high-resolution images and videos.

==== Integration of ITV Local ====
On 4 March 2009, ITV announced that ITV Local would close as a separate business. On 17 March 2009, it did, with the ITV regions integrated into itv.com. The new itv.com/local relaunched during October 2009 and are now prominent in regional news.

=== 2011 design ===
On 31 March 2011 ITV.com had another new design. The home page was completely redesigned, as were the channel minisites. The TV guide and TV shows sections incorporated the new page headers and footers whilst becoming centred for better presentation on wide-screen displays. The news option in the navigational bar offers national and regional news. The sports section also become centred, with a redesigned itv.com/f1 site launching soon thereafter. Other sports minisites are expected to redesigned in the same way when their respective new seasons begin. Many programmes minisites relating to current programmes were centred, whilst shows returning for new series saw their sites redesigned with high-resolution background images and increased interactive and video content. This redesign continues to build upon the social networking functionality introduced in previous versions of the site.

The ITV Player relaunched on Monday 22 August 2011 with a new look and new features. ITV has said there will be upcoming improvements to the ITV Player such as dedicated applications for Android and iOS devices. Currently improvements to the reliability, subtitles on some programmes and a dedicated CITV section have since launched.

ITV has signalled their intention to trial a micro-payments feature on their Web site. It is currently unclear what they will charge for, but this could include consumers paying for alternative story lines for soaps and archive content. The video archive section of the site, introduced in the 2007 redesign was removed when the redesign went live.

=== 2012 news, sport and weather relaunch ===
ITV relaunched its news website in March 2012, including the sport and weather pages.

=== 2013 rebrand ===
As ITV underwent a corporate rebrand in January 2013, the ITV.com website was redesigned to complement the new look.

ITV Mobile was an entertainment portal that offers catch-ups and clips from ITV's soaps: Coronation Street and Emmerdale, ITV Sport and ITV's entertainment shows: This Morning and The X Factor. It also provided the latest information for regional weather forecasts. In 2006, ITV began streaming ITV1 to customers of 3 in the United Kingdom. The service was priced at 99p per day's viewing of ITV, with a £5 per month for an 18 channel unlimited viewing TV pack. The service also was broadcast alongside other PSB channels on the short lived BT Movio service, which used the DAB network in the UK to transmit video channels. The streaming of ITV on mobile was introduced on Vodafone and Orange in 2007. iOS users could also stream ITV1 and ITV2 to their devices via the ITV Mobile site.

=== NewsFix ===
From 2007, ITN and ITV Mobile have produced an ITV News video service. Bulletins were sent to mobiles twice a day, once in the morning and once in the afternoon, two bulletins at the weekend. The service previously charged users £2. The service was eventually replaced with the ITV News website and app.

== See also ==
- ITVX - ITV's streaming service which is the main feature of itv.com
- STV Player - STV's streaming service which is the main feature of stv.tv, serving Central and Northern Scotland
