= ITV Local =

Former British broadband TV service

- Website type: News
- Owner: ITV plc
- Creator: ITV plc
- Website: itv.com/local
- Commercial: Yes
- Registration: No
- Current status: Test phase 2005-06, closed 2009

ITV Local was a broadband TV service provided by UK commercial public service broadcaster ITV plc, the contractor and provider of ITV in 11 of the 15 television regions. First established in 2005, the website provided local news, weather and features on demand 24 hours a day.

The project began with two trial services in Brighton and Hastings in the ITV Meridian region. Due to the success of this, the service was expanded to cover the entire Meridian region, then the whole of the ITV network.

On 4 March 2009, it was announced that ITV Local would close as a separate business. It did so on 17 March 2009, with the regions integrated into itv.com.

== Features ==
ITV Local included the following:

- Local jobs, classified ads and dating
- All versions of the regional news bulletins
- Extended news features and updates through the day
- Entertainment features, extended interviews and an entertainments listings service
- Five-day weather forecasts for all regions
- Many regional programmes, such as Country Ways and current affairs series Focus as shown on Meridian and Metroland in London
- Short films sent in by viewers
- Live streaming cameras from scenic locations and special events
- Short features from local professional filmmakers

Each region's site also featured special channels unique to that area and short-duration special events. ITV Local hosted special features for the British University Sports Association, Cowes Week, the Notting Hill Carnival, Thames Festival, Latitude Festival and the British International Motor Show.

== Additional UGC services ==
ITV Local also offered a range of user-generated content (UGC)-based multi-regional services under the brand, including an iReport-like video upload and social networking site known as YourNews and a site based around local sports events. A new photo-sharing and photo-mapping site was planned for mid-August.

== ITV restructuring and planned closure ==
Changes to the regional structure and output of ITV negatively affected ITV Local, which was heavily dependent on ITV regional content. ITV's core TV advertising business also performed poorly due to the economic downturn. The business was also hit by more general issues at ITV Online, surrounding their gaming offerings and Friends Reunited, which gave concern to shareholders and senior staff. As a result, on 4 March 2009 ITV announced that Local would close in April, as part of a 40% reduction in ITV Online Headcount. The Scoot sub-brand was marked for sale along with Friends Reunited. Some services such as news and weather were transferred to the ITV.com parent brand. ITV Local closed on 17 March 2009 as a separate business, with the regions integrated to itv.com.
