= Primary Times =

Magazine published in the UK and Ireland

The cover of the Primary Times

Primary Times is a free family magazine which is distributed to schools in the United Kingdom and Ireland. The magazine was started in 1989 and aims to inform parents and carers of primary school age children about current forthcoming events, courses and attractions, and community activities. It's published as 61 separate magazines in the UK and Ireland, with a combined distribution of 2.2 million copies per issue.

It is published once every term before each major school holiday plus a "back to school" issue in the autumn, and contains competitions, games and listings of local events.

The magazines do not carry any advertising considered to be offensive to young families or harmful to the best interests of young children. A magazine App for iOS devices is available in Apple's App Store.

In 2020 Primary Times was named as the Best Primary Education Publication by Irish Enterprise Awards.
