= Maes-e =

Welsh language website

- Website type: Internet forum
- Available in: Welsh
- Owners: Private owner (Administrator: Hedd Gwynfor)
- Creator: Nic Dafis
- Website: maes-e.com
- Commercial: Ad supported
- Registration: Required
- Launched: August 2002
- Current status: Active

Maes-e is a Welsh-language internet forum created on 18 August 2002 by Nic Dafis. At its height the site had over 3,000 registered members and was considered an important contribution to the development of the online Welsh-speaking community and the use of the language in cyberspace.

The website allows members to discuss all manner of subjects, and contains subforums on a variety of topics, such as music, computers, cinema, the Welsh language, politics and so on. It has also become a place for the Welsh-language music scene's artists to release information concerning concert dates and new material, but perhaps more importantly in terms of internet use it has proven to be an important place for those wishing to develop Welsh language software and language packs (such as those for Firefox and Windows) to exchange ideas, advice and technical information.

Nic Dafis retired as administrator of the website on 31 December 2007, handing over control to Hedd Gwynfor, a grandchild of Gwynfor Evans.

The site is named after a track of the same name from an album called Libertino by Datblygu.

Although still online as of 2025, the site has seen little use in the last decade, with online forums generally having declined in favour of social media.
