= Broadcasting House, Cardiff =

Building in north Cardiff, Wales

BBC Broadcasting House, Cardiff
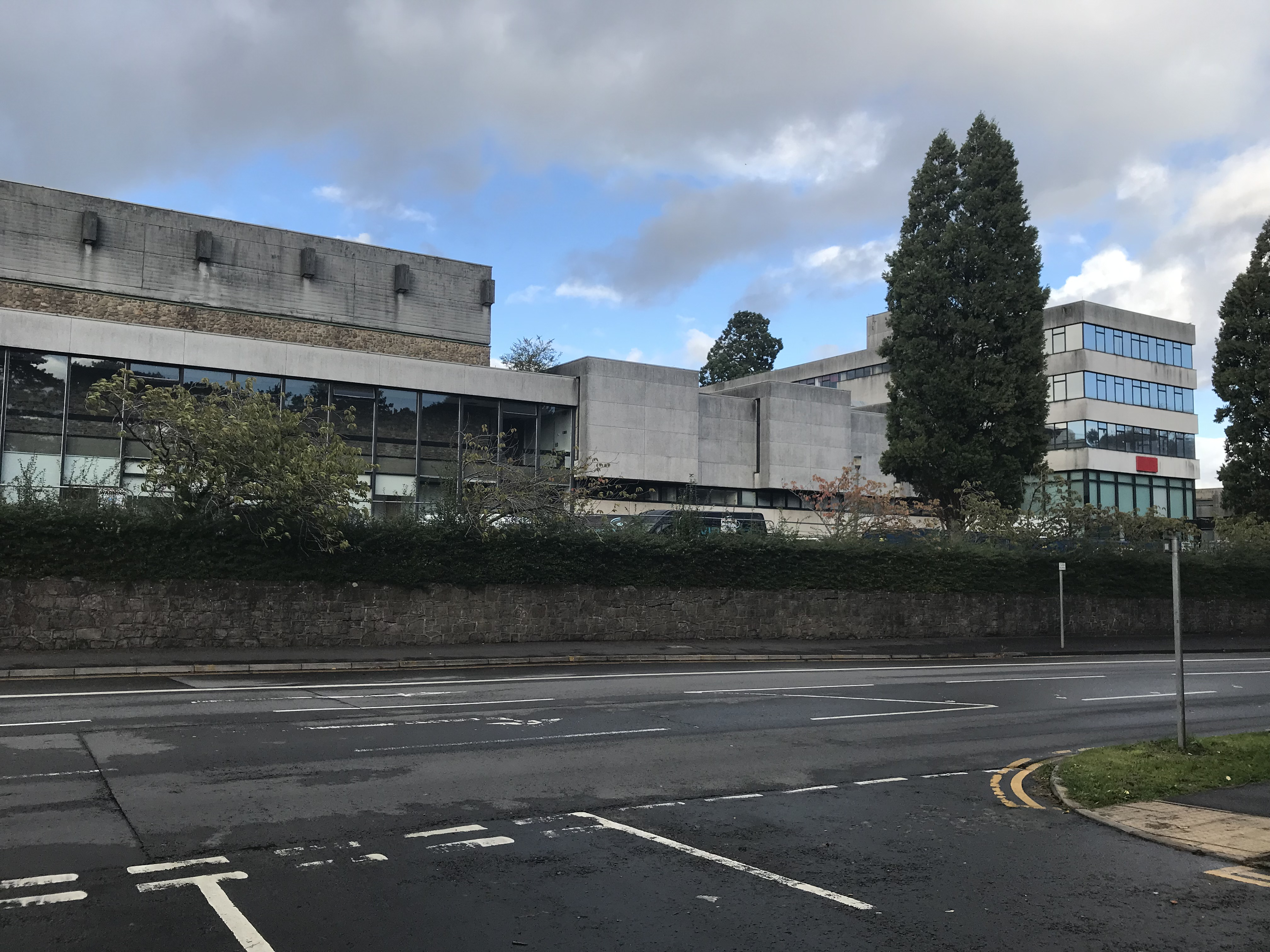
- The former studios of Broadcasting House
- Interactive map of the BBC Broadcasting House, Cardiff area

General information
- Status: Demolished
- Location: Llantrisant Road, Llandaff, Cardiff, Wales
- Coordinates: 51°29′51.36″N 3°13′38.28″W
- Construction started: 1963
- Opened: 1966
- Inaugurated: 1 March 1967
- Closed: 2020
- Demolished: 2021–2022
- Owner: BBC Cymru Wales

Technical details
- Floor count: 6

Design and construction
- Architect: Dale Owen

Broadcasting House was the headquarters of BBC Cymru Wales' radio, television and online services, situated in north Cardiff. The purpose-built facility opened in 1966 and consisted of three blocks containing studios, offices and technical facilities. In 2020 the BBC moved out, transferring to New Broadcasting House in Central Square, Cardiff. The building was demolished between 2021 and 2022, with the site to be used for new housing.

The building housed the national broadcaster for Wales, providing a range of English and Welsh language content for audiences across Wales on television, radio and online.

== History ==
BBC Broadcasting House

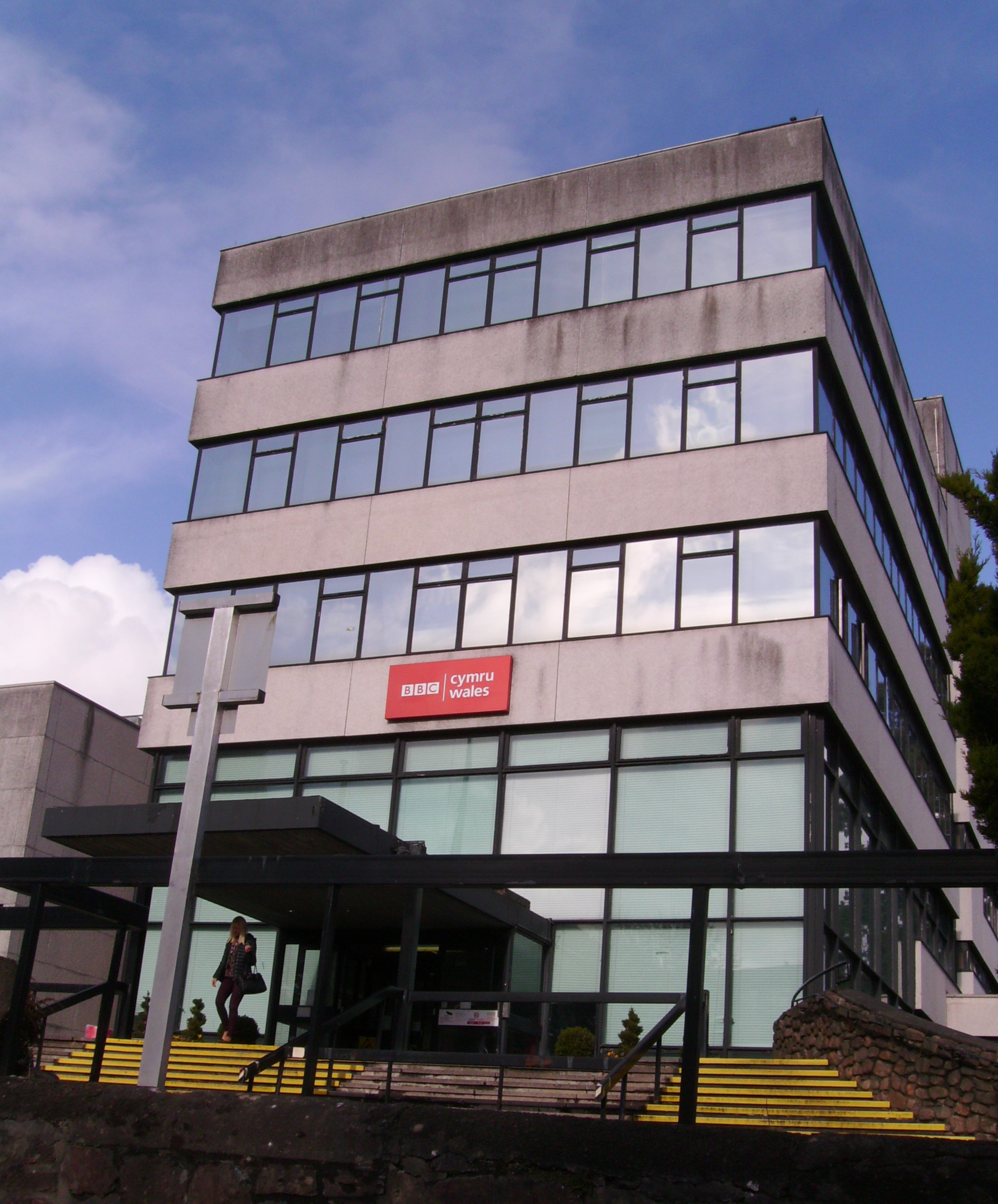
Main reception to Broadcasting House

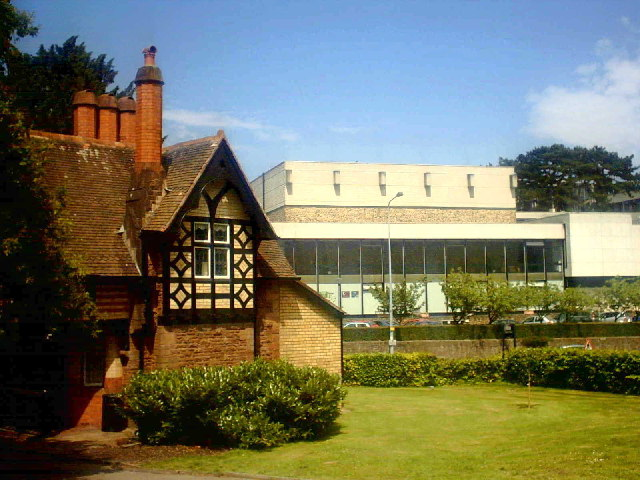
Ty Oldfield (left) was part of the Broadcasting House estate (in the rear)

Broadcasting House was designed by Welsh architect Dale Owen (1924–97). Construction began in 1963. The BBC moved into the building in 1966, which housed production and technical facilities, and was the principal base for BBC Cymru Wales. It was officially opened by Princess Margaret on St David's Day (1 March) 1967.

The building was located in the Llandaff area of northern Cardiff, near the River Taff. It was close to Danescourt railway station and served by several Cardiff Bus services.

The BBC National Orchestra of Wales (BBC NOW) and the BBC National Chorus of Wales moved out of Studio 1 at Broadcasting House into a new facility, BBC Hoddinott Hall at the Wales Millennium Centre in 2009. Much of the BBC television drama studio facilities moved out in 2011 to a new facility in Roath Lock, Cardiff Bay.

In August 2013, it was announced that Broadcasting House and Ty Oldfield (Oldfield House), which is opposite Broadcasting House, was for sale, with plans to move to a new a purpose-built headquarters in Cardiff by 2018. The BBC has said that the "ageing infrastructure at Llandaff is clearly reaching the end of the road and it is time to look to the future". It was said that they considered three possible sites in Cardiff:

- Central Square, which is north of Cardiff Central railway station
- Land south of the railway station
- Land between the Senedd building and the UK headquarters of Atradius.

The Welsh Government's historic environment service Cadw advised that the building should be Grade II listed, but in 2014 John Griffiths, the Welsh Minister for Culture and Sport, overrode the advice and decided not to list the building. The decision was criticised by The Twentieth Century Society, which described it as one of Wales' most outstanding and important post war buildings. In 2014, it was confirmed that Broadcasting House and Ty Oldfield would be demolished and turned into 400 residential units.

The BBC confirmed in 2015 that Central Square would be the location of their new headquarters building. The BBC began to move out of the Llandaff studios during 2019. Wales Today were the last to make the move on 25 September 2020. In September 2020, BBC Wales closed Broadcasting House and completed the move to Central Square.

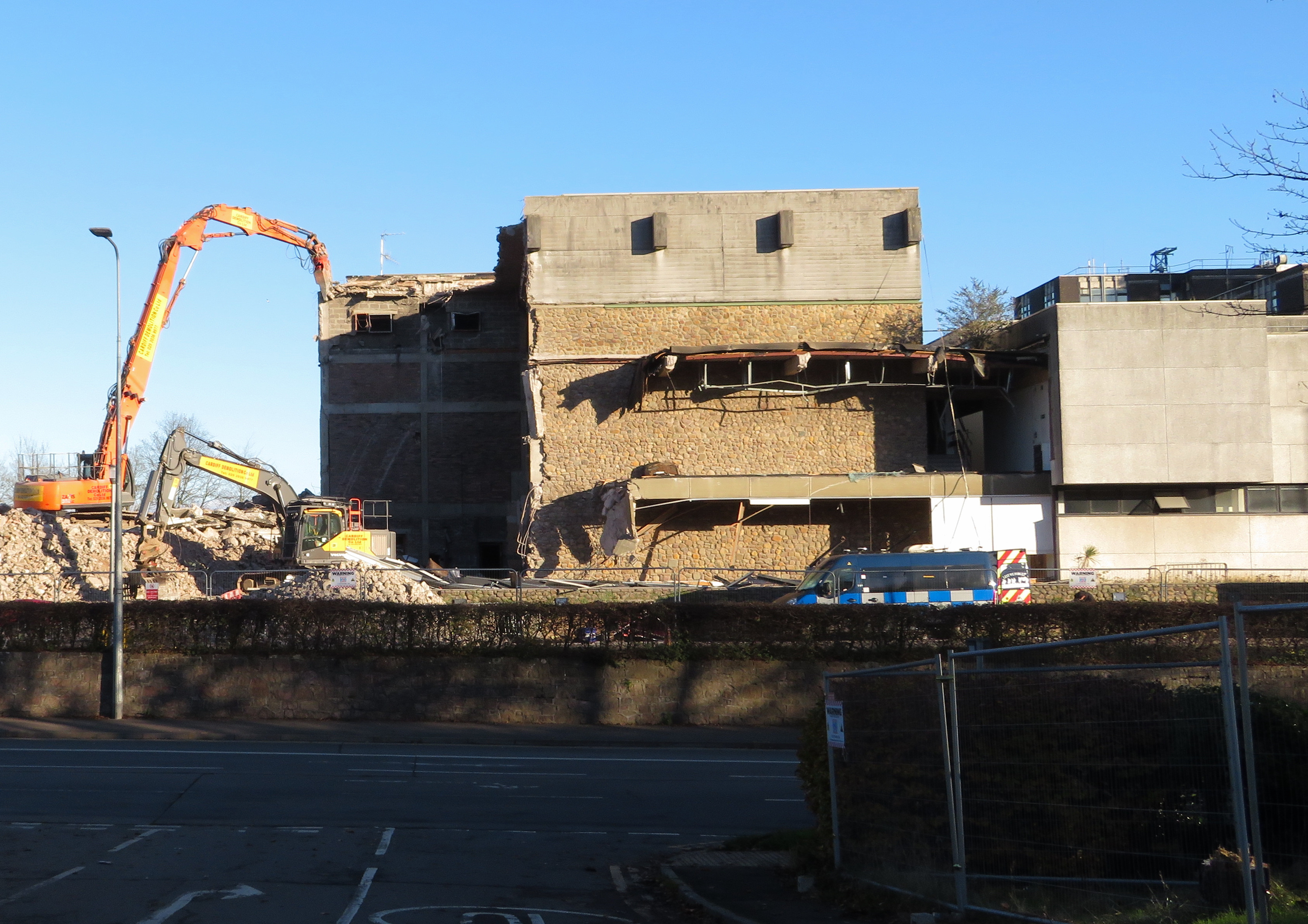
Demolition of Broadcasting House during 2021

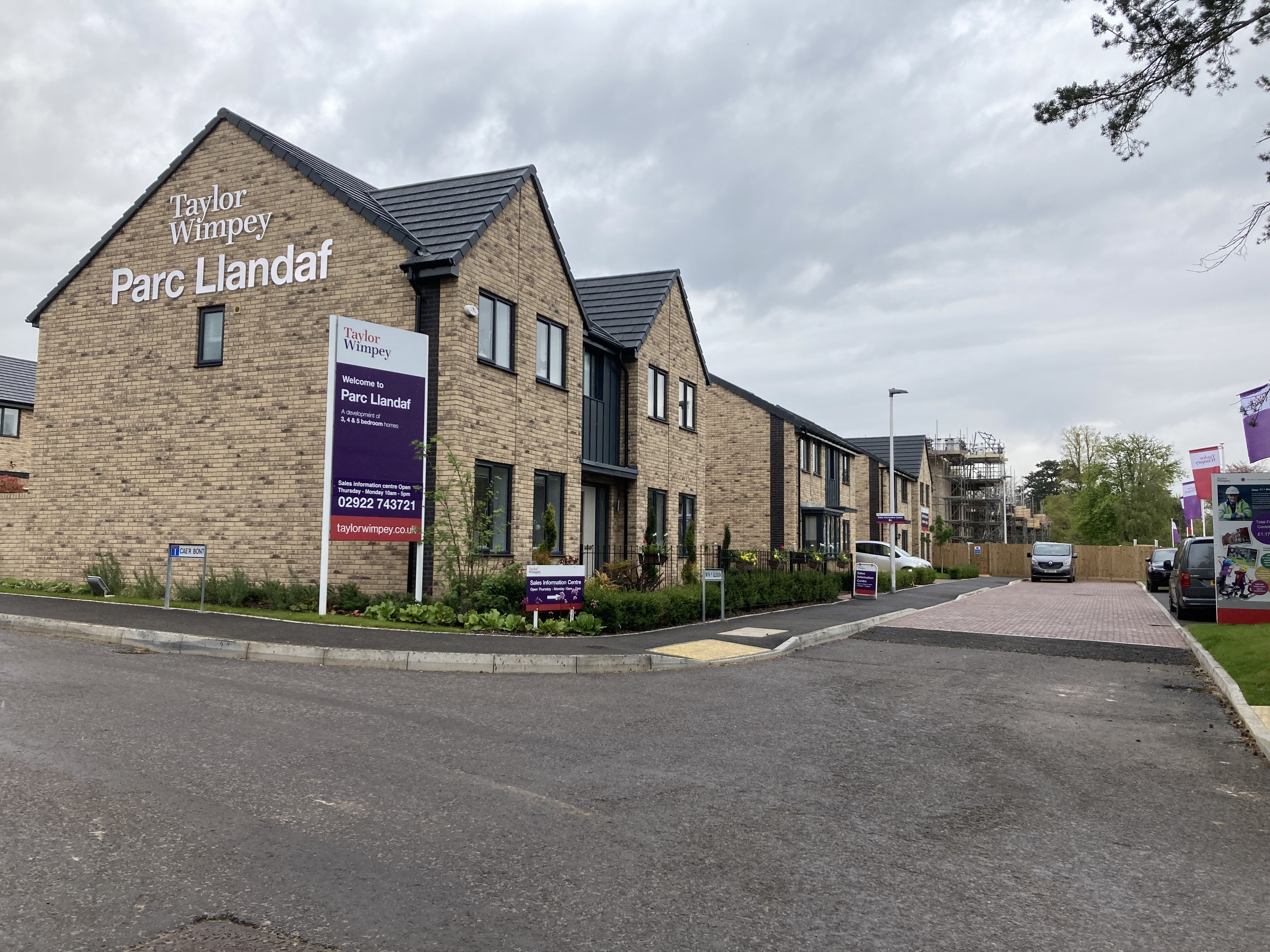
Parc Llandaf in 2024

The site was acquired by the development company Taylor Wimpey for a housing development, and Broadcasting House was demolished between November 2021 through to 2022. The site is now called Parc Llandaf, that will eventually include 377 homes with one and two bedroom apartments, plus three, four and five bedroom houses.

== Architecture ==
The building was modernist in style, and aspects of Dale Owen's design reflected Walter Gropius's 1948 design of the Graduate Center at Harvard University in Massachusetts. Owen had studied at Harvard, and had spent a year working in Gropius's architectural practice, The Architects Collaborative. The design was also influenced by Mies van der Rohe's 1949 design of the Lake Shore Drive apartment buildings in Chicago.

The building incorporated a long low-rise section housing the studios and a tower for the administration offices. The use of a concrete structural frame enabled large areas of glazing, and the main Llantrisant Road elevation was partially glazed.

== Programming ==
Television programmes produced at Broadcasting House Cardiff included BBC Wales Today, Newyddion, Doctor Who Confidential, The Chatterley Affair, Pobol y Cwm, Belonging, High Hopes, Satellite City and The District Nurse.

It was announced in March 2009 that the BBC would move the filming of shows such as Casualty and Crimewatch to the Roath Lock studios in Cardiff.

== See also ==
- BBC Cymru Wales New Broadcasting House
- Roath Lock
- Media in Cardiff
