= Y Dinesydd =

Monthly Welsh-language newspaper

- Type: Monthly newspaper
- Founder(s): Dr. Meredydd Evans
- Founded: 1973
- Language: Welsh
- City: Cardiff, Wales
- Website: dinesydd.cymru

Y Dinesydd (Welsh for The Citizen) is a monthly local Welsh-language newspaper (normally called a papur bro) for Cardiff and the Vale of Glamorgan, Wales, established in April 1973. It was the first local Welsh language newspaper, and was the brainchild of Dr. Meredydd Evans.

The paper is run by a committee of volunteers who are elected annually at an annual general meeting. The paper was free until 2013, when they began to charge a fee. It is available in print and digitally.

It contains news about organisations in Cardiff and the Vale and includes paid advertisements. These organisations include: Cricc, Côrdydd, Menter Caerdydd, Eglwys Minny Street, Eglwys y Crwys, Eglwys Annibynnol Ebeneser, Eglwys Efengylaidd Gymraeg Caerdydd, Ysgol Gyfun Gymraeg Glantaf, Ysgol Gyfun Plasmawr, Ysgol Melin Gruffydd, Aelwyd CF1 and many more. It also includes more general articles, including a regular column on local history, a poetry competition and a crossword puzzle.

Y Dinesydd celebrated its 50th birthday in April 2023.
