= Y Byd =

- Y Byd logo
- Type: Daily newspaper
- Format: Compact
- Owner: Cwmni Dyddiol Cyf
- Founded: 2006
- Political alignment: Unknown
- Headquarters: Machynlleth
- Circulation: Never launched
- Website: www.ybyd.com

Y Byd (The World) was an attempt to launch the first Welsh language daily newspaper. It was scheduled to be published five days a week, from Monday to Friday, as of Monday 3 March 2008. However, on 15 February 2008, the proposed newspaper's owners, Dyddiol, abandoned the plans, citing 'insufficient' funding from the Welsh Assembly Government.

Publication was initially held up by the need to find sufficient subscribers, causing several delays to proposed launch dates. Prior to the cessation of its plans, £300,000 worth of subscriptions had been placed and staff were being employed. The company was hoping to attract 5,000 subscribers ahead of the planned launch. The paper was due to employ 24 people from headquarters in Machynlleth and receive funding from Powys County Council.

The editor for Y Byd was due to be Aled Price, a former BBC Cymru journalist, with Catrin Rogers, a local newspaper editor in London, deputising.

The paper would have cost 70p daily, with Friday's copy — which would have included a weekend supplement — retailing at £1.20.

== Y Byd abandoned ==
On 5 February 2008, the Welsh Assembly minister for the Welsh language, heritage and culture Plaid Cymru's Rhodri Glyn Thomas, announced a subsidy grant of £200,000 to Welsh-language newspapers and magazines every year for the next three years. However, the grant was considerably short of the £600,000 (for the first year) hoped by the owners of Y Byd.

Prior to this announcement, a review into the Welsh-medium press by the Welsh Language Board concluded that there was not enough evidence for a viable daily newspaper in the Welsh language.

On 15 February 2008, a statement by Dyddiol announced that plans for Y Byd had been abandoned. In the statement, Ned Thomas, the chairman of Dyddiol criticised the Assembly government for not meeting a pledge to expand funding and support for Welsh-language press. The editor of Y Byd, Aled Price, resigned following the funding announcement by Thomas.

The company is now said to be considering other options for Welsh-language press.

== See also ==
- List of newspapers in Wales
- List of Celtic-language media
- Lá Nua - Irish language daily, based in Belfast (7,000 circulation)
