= Cube Interactive =

UK interactive media company

- Type: Limited
- Industry: Interactive entertainment Television production
- Founded: 2005
- Founder: Wil Stephens
- Headquarters: London, United Kingdom
- Website: www.cubeinteractive.co.uk

Cube Interactive is a privately owned interactive media and entertainment company founded in 2005 by Wil Stephens.

In 2013, Cube co-produced with Boom Pictures, the UK's first two-screen play-along TV format for kids and in 2014, created and co-produced the first interactive TV format for CBBC, Ludus. Ludus has won wide industry recognition for its innovative format winning a Broadcast Digital Award and a Bafta Games Cymru award.

In 2016, Cube launched its latest interactive television format, Alfi.

In 2016, the Company launched its own kids app label, Cube Kids, to work on such titles as Teletubbies.

In 2016, the Company launched its own adult games label, Fusebox, to work on such titles as The X Factor, Love Island and Catchphrase.

The Company acts as an investment holding company and operates through its owned and managed network of companies.

== Productions ==
- Y Lifft (2013)
- Catchphrase (2013)
- Dipdap (2014)
- Ludus (2014)
- The Visor (2014)
- Alfi (2016 - pre-production)
- The Platform (2016 - pre-production)

== Awards and Accolades ==
- Won: Bafta Cymru award for Cyw (2007)
- Nominated: Bafta Children's for Y Lifft (2013)
- Nominated: Broadcast Digital Award for Dipdap (2014)
- Won: Broadcast Digital Award for Ludus (2014)
- Nominated: Bafta Children's for Cyw a'r Wyddor (2014)
- Nominated: Bafta Children's for Madron (2014)
- Nominated: Bafta Children's for Ludus (2014)
- Won: Bafta Cymru Games award for Madron (2014)
- Won: Bafta Cymru Games award for Ludus (2014)
- Won: Bafta Cymru Games award for Teletubbies (2016)
