= Additional New Zealand Parliament building =

Coordinates: 41°16′40″S 174°46′32″E

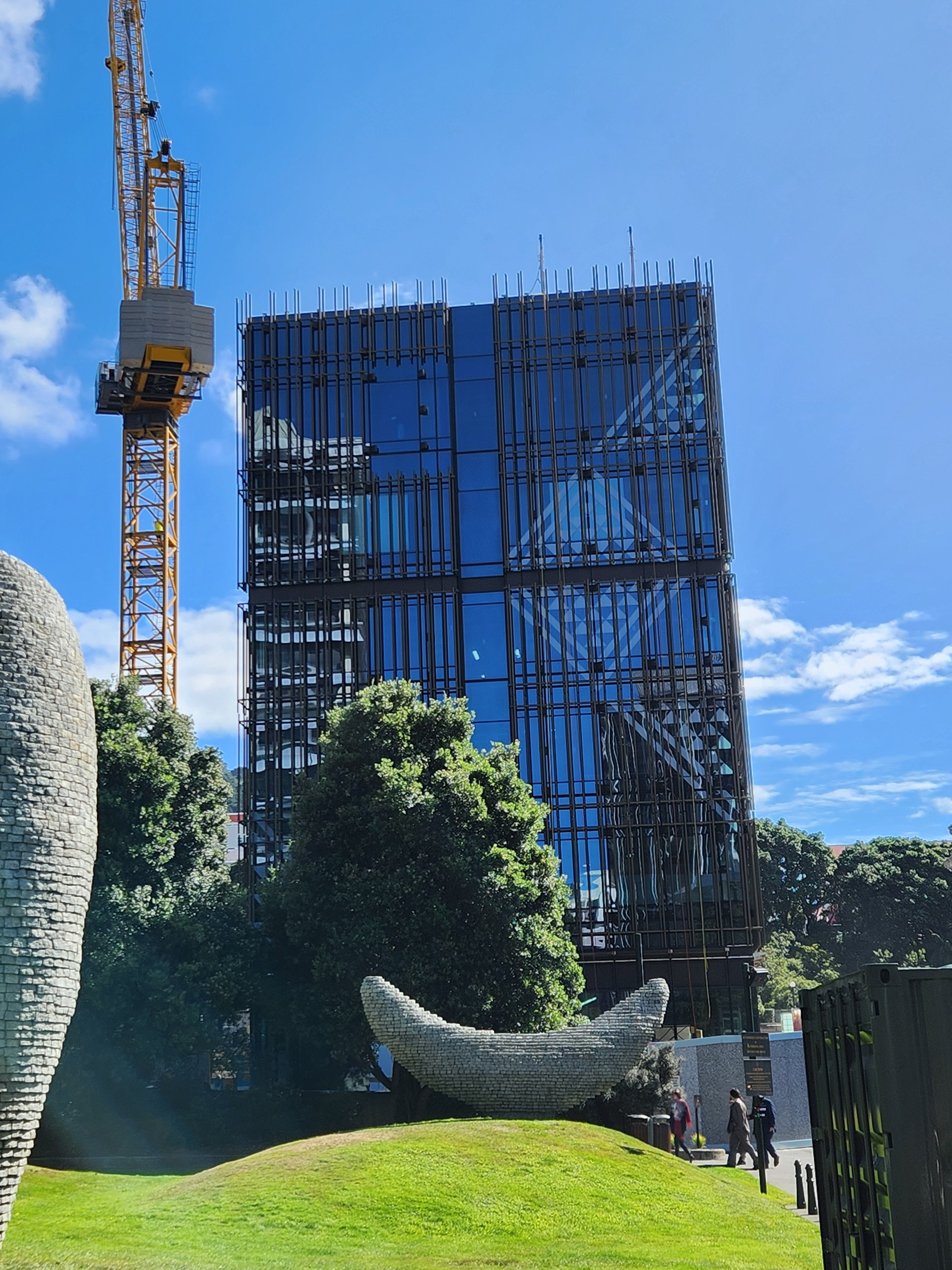
The building under construction in March 2026

An additional New Zealand Parliament building is currently under construction to provide more space for members of Parliament. It is located behind Parliament House in Wellington and is set to be completed in 2027.

== History ==
After World War II, part of the area behind Parliament was designated to be used for radio studios, with Broadcasting House being built in 1969; its seven total studios were reputed to be the "best in Australasia". It was used by Radio New Zealand as well as several local radio stations, and contained the master control for the country's radio operations. Other areas were used for backbenchers, leading the buildings housing them to gain the negative epithet of "Siberia"; these were eventually replaced with car parking.

The Fourth National Government led by Jim Bolger demolished Broadcasting House in 1997, causing protest from radio broadcasters and enthusiasts. Bolger's initial was to use the site for additional parliamentary offices, but this was stopped due to a public petition; similarly plans to move the Beehive behind Parliament and finish Parliament House were cancelled. Instead, the area was used as a public park.

Plans for a new parliament building were approved by Cabinet in 2016 after initiation in 2014. These were terminated in 2017 as part of the Sixth Labour Government's coalition agreement with New Zealand First, who opposed construction of the building. Leader Winston Peters had previously stated that the Old Government Buildings could be used to provide the additional space instead. Due to new seismic strengthening requirements, Bowen House was vacated in 2020, creating an additional need for more space. In the 2020 election, New Zealand First left Parliament and the program was reinitialised, with a revised plan focusing on "sustainability, resilience and co-design with local iwi".

Then-speaker Trevor Mallard announced the plans as part of the 2022 budget. In June 2025, the first pre-assembled frames were lifted into place. Completion is estimated in early 2027.

== Features and design ==
The space is intended to contain around 30 MPs, out of a total of 120 that sit in the New Zealand Parliament. Additionally, the National Crisis Management Centre will be located on the second floor.

The building has six levels. It is intended to have a Green Star 6 rating, with an estimated 90 percent climate impact reduction over the next 60 years. To achieve this goal, it is constructed out of mass timber, with the central support structure being pre-built wooden "H-frames" likened to flatpack furniture. The floors are built with a cavity to prevent additional sound transferring between timber elements, and interior is constructed out of partitions which can be rearranged to suit changing needs and political party makeup; these plug into the floor for integration with services. The exterior of the building features a niho taniwha pattern developed in collaboration with mana whenua, which also reflects the Waipiro Stream that used to run in the area.

For earthquake resistance, the design incorporates mass dampers and base isolation, and is designed to be self-sufficient for up to three days after an earthquake. If the Beehive is rendered non-operational, the new building can serve as a temporary replacement.
