= University Hospital of Wales =

- Cardiff and Vale University Health Board
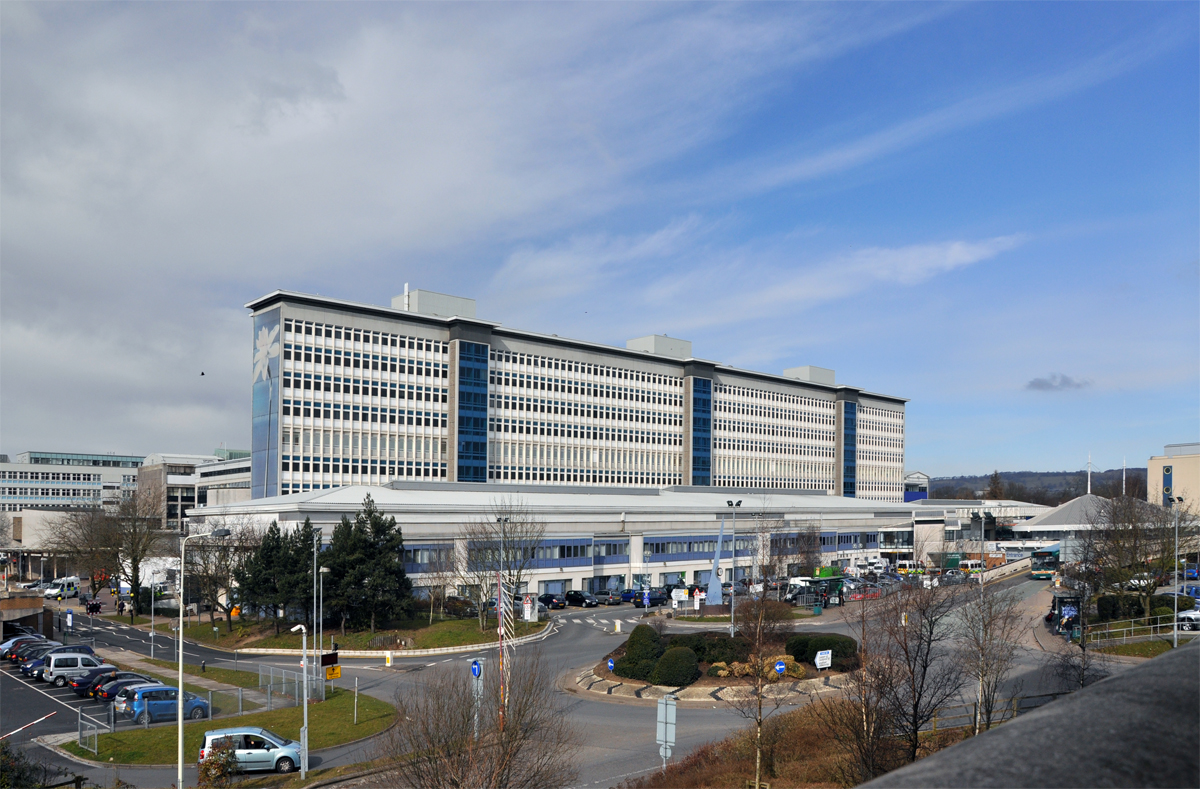
- University Hospital of Wales, Heath Park

- Shown in Cardiff

Geography
- Location: Heath, Cardiff, Wales
- Coordinates: 51.507°N 3.190°W

Organisation
- Care system: NHS Wales
- Type: Teaching
- Affiliated university: Cardiff University School of Medicine

Services
- Emergency department: Yes Major Trauma Centre
- Beds: 1,080

Helipads
- Helipad: Yes

History
- Constructed: 1963–1969
- Founded: 1971

Links
- Website: cavuhb.nhs.wales/hospitals-and-health-centres/our-hospitals/uhw/
- Lists: Hospitals in Wales

University Hospital of Wales (Welsh: Ysbyty Athrofaol Cymru) (UHW), also known as the Heath Hospital, is a 1,080-bed hospital in the Heath district of Cardiff, Wales. It is a teaching hospital of Cardiff University School of Medicine. Construction started in 1963, and the official opening took place in 1971. It was Europe's first fully integrated hospital and medical school, at a cost of £22 million. It is the third largest university hospital in the UK, and the largest hospital in Wales. The hospital was previously managed by Cardiff & Vale NHS Trust. In 2009 the Trust was dissolved and the hospital is now managed by Cardiff and Vale University Health Board.

== History ==
=== Construction ===
Planning for construction of the hospital began in 1951. The land was provided by Cardiff Council, which selected the site based on its accessibility from other parts of Wales as well as within Cardiff. The Welsh Board of Health and University Grants Committee outlined the criteria for an 820-bed hospital in 1953 and proposed a competition for architects to submit plans, although this was not sanctioned until 1958 due to concerns over funding.

The competition was launched in April 1959 and judged by Sir Percy Thomas (Past President of the Royal Institute of British Architects), J.H. Forshaw, F.R.S. Yorke, A. Trevor Jones (Provost of the Welsh National School of Medicine) and A.R. Culley (medical member of the Welsh Board of Health). Forty entries were submitted and the winning design was by Stanley Wayman Milburn, an architect with a special interest in schools and hospitals and who had previously designed 10 hospitals in the north east of England.

The architecture of the hospital is dominated by long, parallel slabs, one eight-storied, the other five-storied. The Prince Charles Hospital in Merthyr Tydfil, Wales, completed in 1975, followed a similar design.

Construction began in 1963 and the dental school opened to clinical students in 1965. Construction of the main hospital building began in 1966 and the topping out ceremony was conducted by G.R. Findlater on 4 July 1969, the eve of the 21st anniversary of the founding of the National Health Service. The hospital was officially opened by Queen Elizabeth II on 19 November 1971.

=== Operation ===
In 2005, Base Structures completed a £1 million project by to construct a walkway joining separate parts of the hospital.

In August 2009, a £16 million birthing centre was opened at the hospital, with three birthing pools. The Midwife Led Unit handles around 90 births a month. In February 2010, a new delivery suite was completed at the Women's Unit, with 14 delivery rooms and two dedicated operating theatres.

In 2011, Cardiff University worked with the University Hospital of Wales to open a PET centre in the hospital. The centre provided both imaging services and the production of PET radiotracers. In August 2025, production side of the centre closed as Cardiff University was unwilling to pay for the £7m refit of the cyclotron. Cardiff University initially hoped to hand over operations of the cyclotron to a private operator but were prevented from doing so by Cardiff and Vale University Health Board. Whistleblowers claimed this was due to concerns around the disrepair of the hospital and fears that downtime caused by potential leaks or power outages could open the health board up to litigation from a private operator. The cyclotron is expected to be decommissioned, which will cost £2m. As a result of the cyclotron's closure, Wales is no longer able to produce radiotracers for research or treatment and has to purchase them from England.

In early 2019, the Cardiff and Vale University Health Board announced plans to build a new hospital by 2030, as part of a wider reorganisation of hospital services, including the University Hospital Llandough, Noah's Ark Children's Hospital, Cardiff Royal Infirmary, Barry Hospital and Whitchurch Hospital.

In September 2020, the University Hospital of Wales became the major trauma centre for the South Wales region.

On 8 February 2021, Lakeside Wing was completed. The modular building houses a multi-disciplinary model of care, with physiotherapists, occupational therapists, dieticians, pharmacists, healthcare support workers and registered nurses all working in the facility. The wing accommodates up to 400 beds.

=== Deterioration ===
In 1978, the main building was found to have deteriorated dangerously; £1 million was spent on repairs. The Welsh Office revealed in 1981 that a further £7.7 million was required for repairs.

Cardiff and Vale University Health Board has publicly announced plans for a new building to house the hospital in both 2019 and 2021. But by 2025 plans had stalled with neither the Health Board or Welsh Government providing updates. A July 2021 infrastructure report into the hospital concluded that there was likely to be a critical failure in the future due to the deterioration of the building. It was advised that a new hospital building would be needed to ensure the safety of both patients and staff. In June 2025, the Government put the hospital in level 4 escalation, due to concerns around the quality and care provided. Mentioned in the escalation was the poor condition of building, which was negatively impacting staff morale and their ability to provide services.

By 2026, the estimated backlog of maintenance for the UHW had reached £111m with more than £41m of the repairs being considered as high risk.

== Departments ==
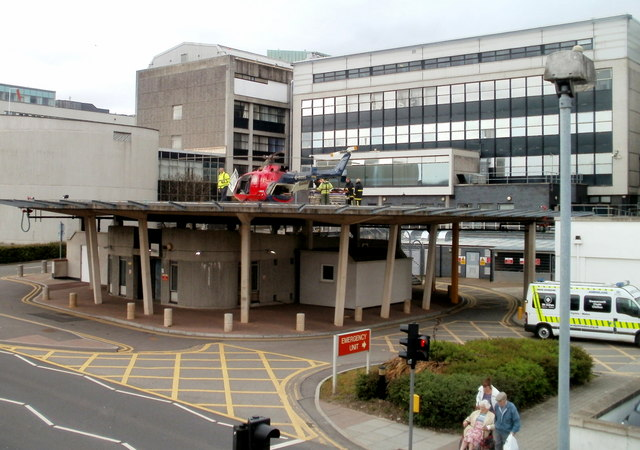
A MBB Bo 105 Helicopter landing at the University Hospital of Wales helipad.

=== Accident and Emergency unit ===
The Accident and Emergency unit is the third largest in the United Kingdom. In 2009, it treated an average of 750 people each weekend. The unit was scheduled to have a £3.4 million refit in 2013, but this was rescheduled due to increased demand on the service and the disruption the work would cause. In July 2020, the "call before you walk" system was adopted: less severely ill patients are directed to other services and those who need to be in A&E are given an appointment. An analysis of 515 patients who attended on 18 November 2019 found that 109 patients could have been given advice on how to treat themselves or been seen elsewhere.

=== Transplant unit ===
A £4.27m transplant unit opened in August 2010, after three years of planning. It is on the top floor of a new building that also houses a renal outpatients’ department. It replaced a unit on ward B5 to increase availability of kidney transplants in Cardiff. UHW is Wales’ only kidney transplant centre and caters for patients from South, Mid and West Wales.

=== Hospital radio ===
The University Hospital of Wales is home to Radio Glamorgan, founded in 1967. In March 2014, the station won three national awards at the National Hospital Broadcasting Association awards held in Bristol. Radio Glamorgan also streams live over the internet.

== Car parking ==
Parking facilities at the hospital were managed by Indigo Park Services UK Limited on a 15-year contract until June 2018. Indigo made a profit of £2.8 million in 2016 from this contract, from charges and fines. 80 staff challenged their fines in court. The hearing found that staff must pay £128 for each parking ticket, and the costs of the hearing, which amounted to £29,000. The company cancelled parking charge notices issued up to the end of March 2016, leaving more than 100,000 unpaid tickets outstanding. Parking is now managed by Parking Eye Ltd.

== In popular culture ==
University Hospital of Wales was the subject of the television series Hospital 24/7, a documentary drama from BBC One about patients and staff. The first season was filmed in August 2008 and broadcast in January 2009. Two further seasons were broadcast in 2010 and 2011.

The hospital was also featured in BBC series Saving Lives in Cardiff, which also featured Noah’s Ark Children’s Hospital for Wales and University Hospital Llandough. The series was filmed throughout 2024 and two seasons were produced. The Open University's School of Health, Wellbeing and Social Care produced interactive online content to accompany the series, aimed to help viewers understand the choices made by busy NHS clinicians.

== Controversies ==
=== Breaches of the Human Tissue Act ===
In August 2009, postmortem examinations were stopped at the hospital following an inspection which revealed serious breaches of the Human Tissue Act 2004, including the unauthorized storage of human brains.

=== H1N1 virus ===
In November 2009, the first person-to-person transmission of Tamiflu-resistant H1N1 in the world was confirmed at the hospital. Five patients were infected, with three apparently having been infected in the hospital itself in a case of iatrogenic transmission.

=== Sterility of surgical instruments ===
In June 2010, surgery was discontinued temporarily after surgeons complained the instruments they had been given had not been sterilized properly and were visibly dirty.

== See also ==
- Noah's Ark Children's Hospital for Wales
