= Richard Oreffo =

British–Nigerian physician

Richard Oreffo OBE FMedSci FRSB
- Education: University of Oxford; University of Liverpool
- Awards: Maxime Hanns Award (2001); Medical Technology Awards Grand Prix (2010); Fellow of the Royal Society of Biology (2015); Fellow of International Orthopaedic Research (2019)
- Scientific career
- Workplaces: University of Southampton; Zeneca; University of Oxford; University of Texas Health Science Center at San Antonio
- Thesis: Vitamin A and bone (1986)

Richard Okagbue Chude Oreffo is a British–Nigerian physician and Professor of Musculoskeletal Science at the University of Southampton. His research considers skeletal biology and the fundamental mechanisms that underpin skeletal stem cell differentiation. In 2020, he launched the Cowrie Scholarship Foundation, which supports Black British students in their university studies.

== Early life and education ==
Oreffo is a British–Nigerian. As an undergraduate student Oreffo specialised in biochemistry at the University of Liverpool. Oreffo completed doctoral research at the University of Oxford, where he investigated Vitamin A and bone. Oreffo was a postdoctoral scholar at the University of Texas Health Science Center at San Antonio. Here he worked with Gregory Mundy, an expert in bone and mineral research. He returned to the United Kingdom in 1989, where he joined Zeneca as a principal research scientist. In 1993 Oreffo was awarded a Medical Research Council fellowship, and joined the University of Oxford.

== Research and career ==
In 1999, Oreffo joined the University of Southampton, where he led the Bone and Joint Research Group. He was made Professor in 2004. Oreffo specialises in skeletal biology, with a focus on the mechanisms that underpin differentiation of skeletal stem cells and bone regeneration. His early work looked to create new, nanostructured surfaces capable of efficiently growing adult stem cells. In 2004 he founded the Centre for Human Development, Stem Cells and Regeneration.

Oreffo combined stem cells and degradable plastic to create an artificial bone, which incorporated a honeycomb-like scaffold to allow blood to flow through it. The flow of blood encourages a patient's own stem cells to attach to the artificial structure, which results in the growth of new bone. Eventually, the plastic degrades, and the structure is replaced by newly formed bone. The degradable plastic is a blend of three different materials.

After successfully realising artificial bone, Oreffo created the spinout company Renovos, who fabricate new materials for tissue repair. In early 2020 the non-profit Orthopaedic Research UK made an investment in Renovos, representing their first investment in a technology startup.

== Awards and honours ==
- 2001 Maxime Hanns Award
- 2010 Medical Technology Awards Grand Prix
- 2015 Elected Fellow of the Royal Society of Biology
- 2019 Elected Fellow of International Orthopaedic Research
- 2022 Elected Fellow of the Academy of Medical Sciences

== Academic service ==
In 2008, Oreffo was made the University of Southampton Associate Dean International and Enterprise. In 2015 Oreffo returned to the University of Oxford, where he completed a Doctor of Science in skeletal tissue engineering. Oreffo established the Cowrie Scholarship Foundation in 2020, a scheme which looks to provide financial support to 100 disadvantaged Black British students to attend universities in the United Kingdom between 2021 and 2031.

== Selected publications ==
- Dalby, Matthew J.; Gadegaard, Nikolaj; Tare, Rahul; Andar, Abhay; Riehle, Mathis O.; Herzyk, Pawel; Wilkinson, Chris D. W.; Oreffo, Richard O. C. (2007). "The control of human mesenchymal cell differentiation using nanoscale symmetry and disorder". Nature Materials. 6 (12): 997–1003. Bibcode:2007NatMa...6..997D. doi:10.1038/nmat2013. ISSN 1476-4660. PMID 17891143.
- Rose, Felicity R.A.J.; Oreffo, Richard O.C. (2002). "Bone Tissue Engineering: Hope vs Hype". Biochemical and Biophysical Research Communications. 292 (1): 1–7. doi:10.1006/bbrc.2002.6519. PMID 11890663.
- McMurray, Rebecca J.; Gadegaard, Nikolaj; Tsimbouri, P. Monica; Burgess, Karl V.; McNamara, Laura E.; Tare, Rahul; Murawski, Kate; Kingham, Emmajayne; Oreffo, Richard O. C.; Dalby, Matthew J. (2011). "Nanoscale surfaces for the long-term maintenance of mesenchymal stem cell phenotype and multipotency". Nature Materials. 10 (8): 637–644. Bibcode:2011NatMa..10..637M. doi:10.1038/nmat3058. ISSN 1476-4660. PMID 21765399.
- Roach, Helmtrud I.; Bronner, Felix; Oreffo, Richard O. C., eds. (2011). Epigenetic Aspects of Chronic Diseases. London: Springer-Verlag. ISBN 978-1-84882-643-4.
