= Pascal Soriot =

French businessman

Sir Pascal Soriot
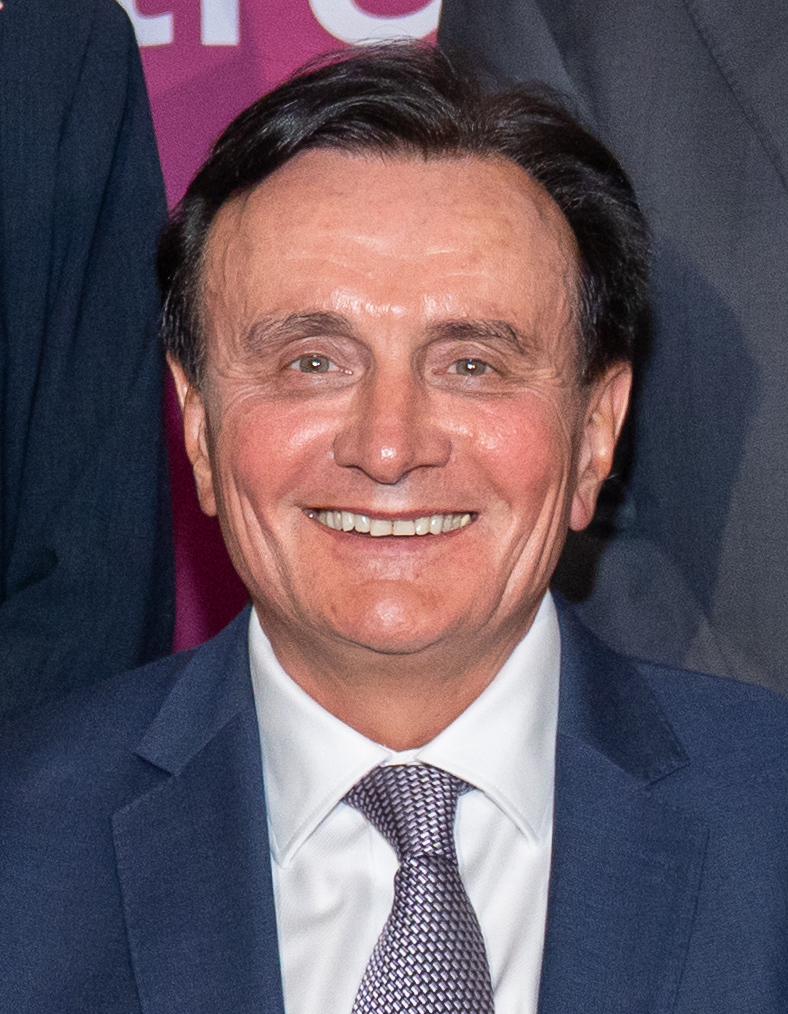
- Soriot in 2025
- Born: Pascal Claude Roland Soriot; 23 May 1959 (age 66); France
- Citizenship: French; Australian
- Education: École nationale vétérinaire d'Alfort; HEC Paris
- Occupation: Businessman
- Years active: 1982–present
- Title: CEO, AstraZeneca
- Term: 2012–
- Children: 2
- Honours: Knight Bachelor

Sir Pascal Claude Roland Soriot (born 23 May 1959) is a French-born Australian businessman and chief executive of the British-Swedish multinational pharmaceutical and biotechnology company AstraZeneca.

== Early life ==
Soriot was born in France on 23 May 1959. His father died when he was 20.

He studied veterinary medicine at the École nationale vétérinaire d'Alfort at Maisons-Alfort in Paris. He later obtained an MBA at HEC Paris.

== Career ==
=== Roussel Uclaf ===
In April 1986, he joined Roussel Uclaf (formerly France's second largest pharmaceutical company, until bought by Hoechst AG in 1997) as a salesman in Australia. In 1996, he became General Manager of Hoechst Marion Roussel in Australia, moving to Tokyo in April 1997.

=== Aventis ===
In 2000 he moved to Aventis in America, becoming chief operating officer of Aventis USA in 2002, which became Sanofi Aventis USA in 2004.

=== Roche ===
He joined Roche in 2006 as head of marketing. From April 2009 to 2010, he was chief executive of the Roche subsidiary Genentech. He rejoined Roche Pharma AG in 2010 as chief operating officer.

=== AstraZeneca ===
In August 2012 he was named as the new chief executive of AstraZeneca, the world's fifth largest pharmaceutical company, when aged 53. He took up the post on 1 October 2012.

In July 2017, it was reported that Soriot would become the next CEO of Israel-based Teva Pharmaceutical Industries, succeeding Erez Vigodman, though this was soon denied.

In September 2018, he made headlines commenting on his pay of £9.4m in salary and bonuses. 'The truth is I’m the lowest-paid CEO in the whole industry', he said. 'It is annoying to some extent. But at the end of the day it is what it is.'

In 2023, Soriot was the highest paid CEO of the major European pharmaceutical companies, as he earned $21.3 million. That was a nearly 12 per cent increase over 2022.

In March 2024, Soriot was awarded the President's Medal by the Society of Chemical Industry for leading AstraZeneca’s COVID-19 vaccination programme.

== Personal life ==
He is married and has two children. He has three brothers, all of whom are doctors.

Soriot was knighted in the 2022 Birthday Honours for services to UK life sciences and the response to COVID-19. He qualifies for a substantive knighthood rather than an honorary one by virtue of being an Australian citizen.

He counts cycling, horse riding and skiing as hobbies.

Business positions
Preceded by David Brennan	Chief Executive of AstraZeneca; 2012–present	Succeeded by Incumbent
Preceded by	Chief Operating Officer of Hoffmann-La Roche; 2010–2012	Succeeded by Daniel O'Day
Preceded by	Chief Executive of Genentech; 2009–2010	Succeeded by Ian Clark
