= Stefan P. Kruszewski =

American clinical and forensic psychiatrist

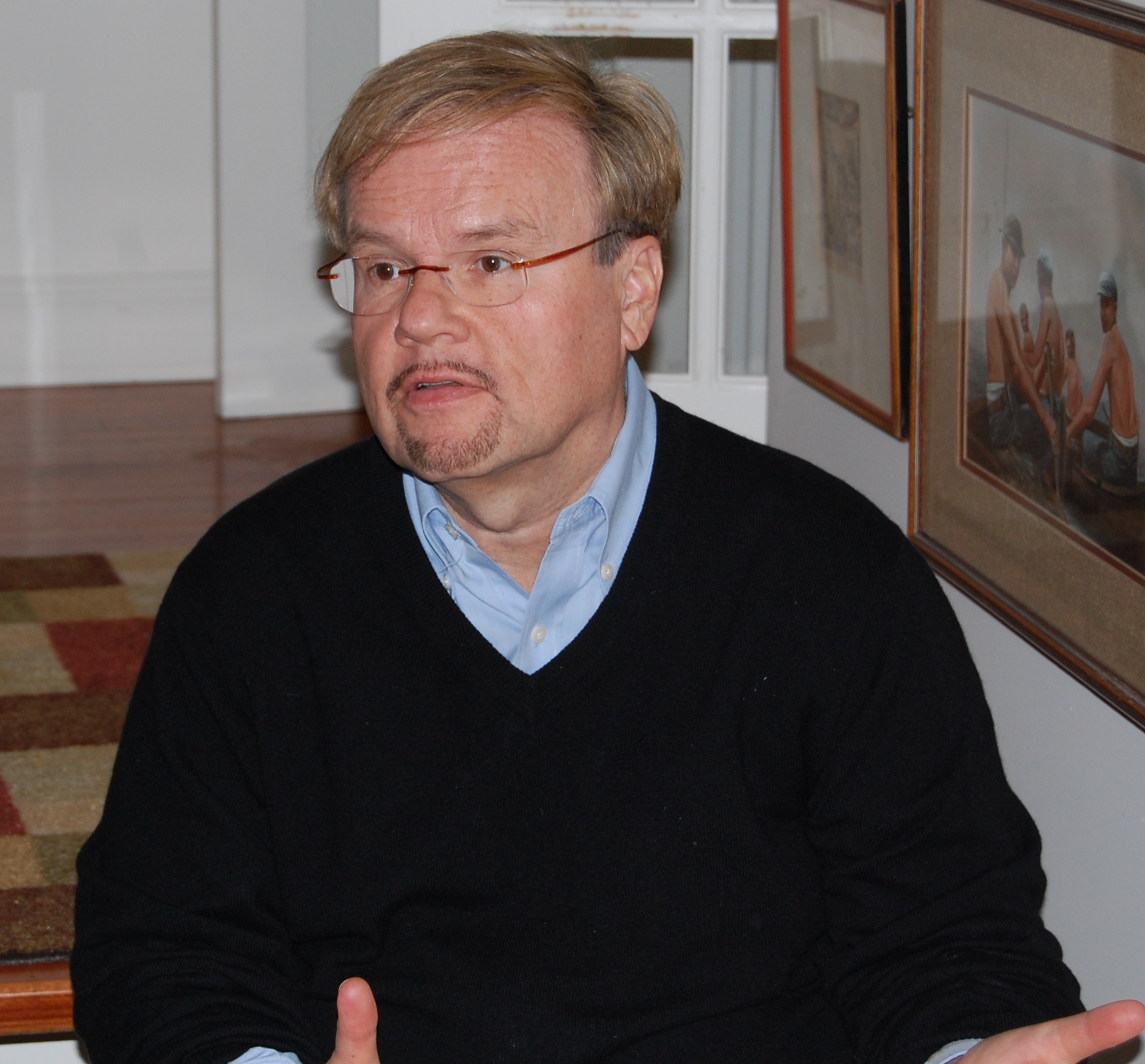
Kruszewski in 2011

Stefan Philip Kruszewski is an American clinical and forensic psychiatrist, active as a whistleblower in medically related cases. He is principal in the company which bears his name, Stefan P. Kruszewski, M.D. & Associates, P.C. in Harrisburg, Pennsylvania.

== Career ==
=== Psychiatrist ===
A graduate of Princeton University and Harvard Medical School, Kruszewski has over 30 years of clinical and teaching experience in the field of psychiatry, with particular focus on addictionology, neuropsychiatry and neuropharmacology.

Kruszewski is a forensic specialist and has worked with both plaintiff and defense litigation. He has testified as an expert witness in a range of cases involving antipsychotic medications), antidepressant medications, analgesic medications (including opioids), and a range of psychiatric illnesses. Kruszewski has been recognized as a "distinguished expert" by senior federal judge, the Honorable Jack B. Weinstein, United States District Court for the Eastern District of New York (June 2007). He has been recognized as a psychiatric expert by the Honorable Patti B. Saris and testified in the Federal Daubert hearings in US District Court of Massachusetts (May 2009). Honorable Judge Rhonda E. Fischer has also accepted and affirmed expert testimony by Kruszewski in the Frye Hearings in District Court of the County of Nassau, New York State (Jan-May 2009).

=== Fraud investigator ===
As a fraud investigator for the Commonwealth of Pennsylvania in 2003, Kruszewski uncovered the abuse and medical mistreatment of children and the mentally ill in residential treatment centers, and was eventually fired for trying to expose what he had discovered. Kruszewski brought suit for First Amendment claims against the Pennsylvania Department of Public Welfare and in June 2007 he was awarded a settlement. Also resulting, Kruszewski filed his first qui tam lawsuit which settled in 2009 against Southwood Psychiatric Hospital.

He has been a relator in two additional successful qui tam lawsuits: the first against Pfizer for its drug Bextra which settled in October 2009, and the second against AstraZeneca for its drug Seroquel which settled in April 2010.

=== Whistleblower ===
Kruszewski is a three-time successful whistleblower, with settlements from suits brought against Southwood Psychiatric Hospital, Pfizer, Inc., and AstraZeneca. Kruszewski became aware of inadequate care and the exploiting of state-committed mentally ill children through overmedication and physical and chemical restraints while working for the Department of Public Welfare, Bureau of Program Integrity for the Commonwealth of Pennsylvania. When he refused to keep silent about his discoveries, he was fired from his position at the state. Kruszewski won settlements for both a First Amendment case against the state of Pennsylvania as well as his first qui tam lawsuit against the hospital. In the cases against pharmaceutical giants, Pfizer and AstraZeneca, Kruszewski highlighted clinical science that was misrepresented by the defendants in their marketing and promotion of certain drugs. He also demonstrated problems with off-label marketing (marketing that promotes uses, patients or doses that are not approved by the US FDA) which resulted in heightened, but often non-transparent, risk to the health of patients and exceptional costs to taxpayers and state and federal governments.
