= AstraZeneca =

Swedish-British pharmaceutical company

AstraZeneca plc

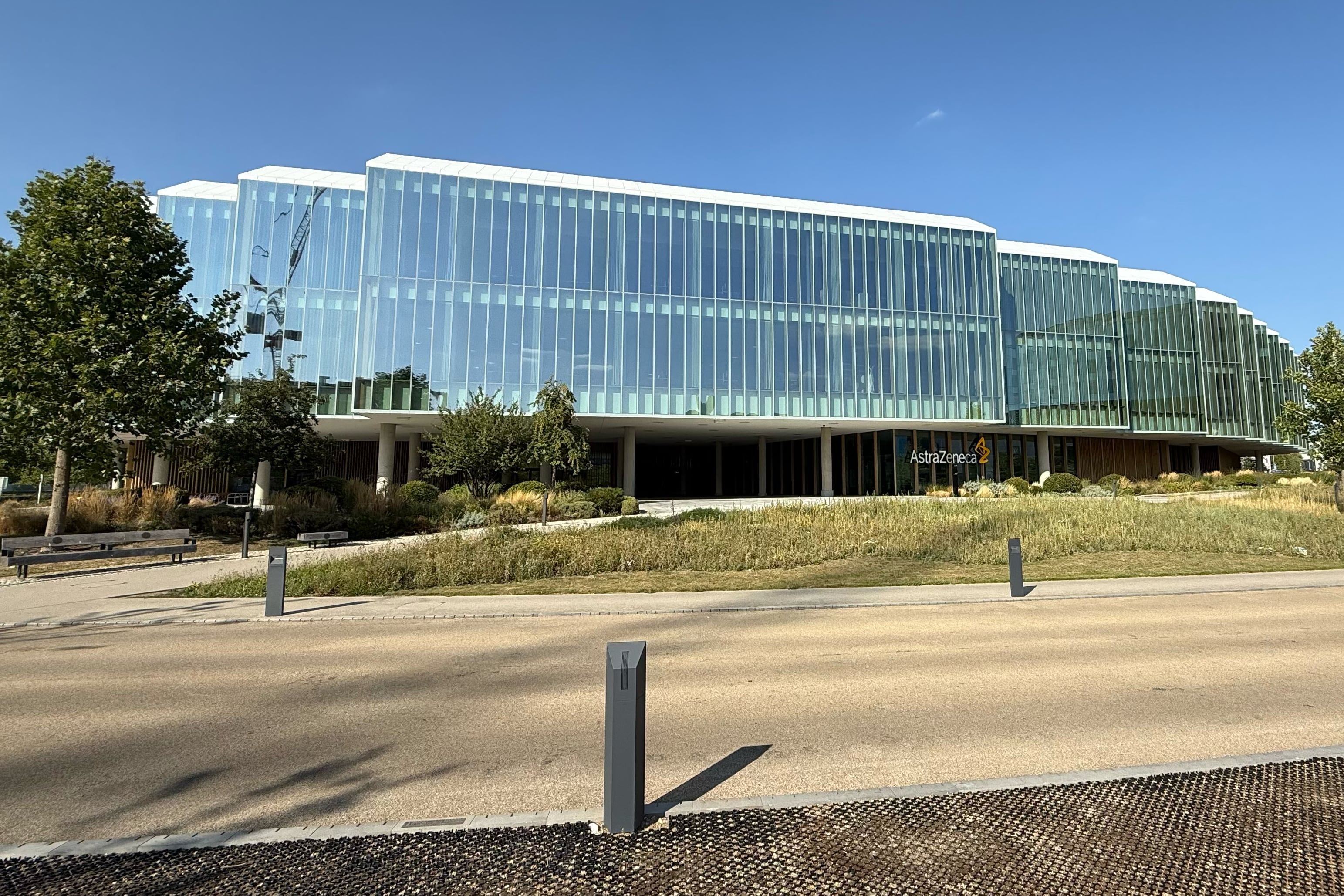
- AstraZeneca's headquarters in Cambridge
- Type: Public
- Traded as: LSE: AZN; Nasdaq Stockholm: AZN; NYSE: AZN; FTSE 100 component; OMX Stockholm 30 component
- ISIN: GB0009895292
- Industry: Pharmaceutical; Biotechnology
- Predecessors: Astra AB; Zeneca Group plc
- Founded: 6 April 1999; 27 years ago
- Headquarters: Cambridge Biomedical Campus, Cambridge, England, UK
- Area served: Global
- Key people: Michel Demaré (chairman); Sir Pascal Soriot (CEO)
- Products: Pharmaceutical drugs; vaccines
- Revenue: ▲US$58.739 billion (2025)
- Operating income: ▲US$13.743 billion (2025)
- Net income: ▲US$10.233 billion (2025)
- Total assets: ▲US$114.074 billion (2025)
- Total equity: ▲US$48.719 billion (2025)
- Number of employees: 89,900 (2025)
- Subsidiaries: Alexion Pharmaceuticals; MedImmune
- Website: astrazeneca.com

AstraZeneca plc (/ˌæstrəˈzɛnəkə/) (AZ) is a Swedish–British multinational pharmaceutical and biotechnology company with its headquarters at the Cambridge Biomedical Campus in Cambridge, England. It has a portfolio of products for major diseases in areas including oncology, cardiovascular, gastrointestinal, infection, neuroscience, respiratory, and inflammation.

The company was founded in 1999 through the merger of the Swedish Astra AB and the British Zeneca Group (itself formed by the demerger of the pharmaceutical operations of Imperial Chemical Industries in 1993). Zeneca shareholders received 53.5% of the shares, while Astra shareholders received the remaining 46.5%. Its portfolio includes primary and speciality care, coverage for rare diseases, and a robust global presence across various regions. Since the merger it has been among the world's largest pharmaceutical companies and has made numerous corporate acquisitions, including Cambridge Antibody Technology (in 2006), MedImmune (in 2007), Spirogen (in 2013) and Definiens (by MedImmune in 2014). It has its research and development concentrated in three strategic centres: Cambridge, England; Gothenburg, Sweden; and Gaithersburg, Maryland, US.

AstraZeneca traces its earliest corporate history to 1913, when Astra AB was formed by a large group of doctors and apothecaries in Södertälje. Throughout the twentieth century, it grew into the largest pharmaceutical company in Sweden. Its British counterpart, Zeneca PLC, was formed in 1993 when ICI divested its pharmaceuticals businesses; Astra AB and Zeneca PLC merged six years later, with the chosen headquarters in the United Kingdom.

AstraZeneca's primary listing is on the London Stock Exchange and is a constituent of the FTSE 100 Index; it also secondary listings on Nasdaq Stockholm and the New York Stock Exchange. AstraZeneca has one of the highest market capitalisations of pharmaceutical companies worldwide.

== History ==
Astra AB was founded in 1913 in Södertälje, Sweden, by 400 doctors and apothecaries. In 1993 the British chemicals company ICI (established from four British chemical companies) demerged its pharmaceuticals businesses and its agrochemicals and specialities businesses, to form Zeneca Group PLC. Finally, in 1999 Astra and Zeneca Group merged to form AstraZeneca plc, with its headquarters in London. In 1999, AstraZeneca identified a new location for the company's US base, the "Fairfax-plus" site in North Wilmington, Delaware.

=== 2000–2006 ===
In September 2002, its drug Iressa (gefitinib) was approved in Japan as monotherapy for non-small cell lung cancer. On 3 January 2004 Dr Robert Nolan, a former director of AstraZeneca, formed the management team of ZI Medical.

In December 2005, the company acquired KuDOS Pharmaceuticals, a UK biotech company, for £120 million. That same year, the firm also became a Diamond Member of the Pennsylvania Bio commerce organisation.

In May 2006, following a collaborative relationship begun in 2004, AstraZeneca acquired Cambridge Antibody Technology for £702 million.

=== 2007–2012: The patent cliff and subsequent acquisitions ===
In February 2007, AstraZeneca agreed to buy Arrow Therapeutics, a company focused on the discovery and development of anti-viral therapies, for US$150 million. AstraZeneca's pipeline, and "patent cliff", was the subject of much speculation in April 2007 leading to pipeline-boosting collaboration and acquisition activities. A few days later AstraZeneca acquired US company MedImmune for about US$15.2 billion to gain flu vaccines and an anti-viral treatment for infants; AstraZeneca subsequently consolidated all of its biologics operations into a dedicated biologics division called MedImmune.

In December 2009, AstraZeneca acquired Novexel Corp, an antibiotics discovery company formed in 2004 as a spin-off of the Sanofi-Aventis anti-infectives division. Astra acquired the experimental antibiotic NXL-104 (CEF104) (CAZ-AVI) through this acquisition.

In December 2011, AstraZeneca acquired Guangdong BeiKang Pharmaceutical Company, a Chinese generics business.

In February 2012, AstraZeneca and Amgen announced a collaboration on treatments for inflammatory diseases. Then in April 2012, AstraZeneca acquired Ardea Biosciences, another biotechnology company, for $1.26 billion. In June 2012, AstraZeneca and Bristol Myers Squibb announced a two-stage deal for the joint acquisition of the biotechnology company Amylin Pharmaceuticals. It was agreed that Bristol Myers Squibb would acquire Amylin for $5.3 billion in cash and the assumption of $1.7 billion in debt, with AstraZeneca then paying $3.4 billion in cash to Bristol Myers Squibb, and Amylin being folded into an existing diabetes joint venture between AstraZeneca and Bristol Myers Squibb.

=== 2013 restructuring and beyond ===
==== 2013 ====
In March 2013, AstraZeneca announced plans for a major corporate restructuring, including the closure of its research and development activities at Alderley Park in Cheshire and Loughborough in the UK and at Lund in Sweden, investment of $500 million in the construction of a new research and development facility in Cambridge and the concentration of R&D in three locations: Cambridge, Gaithersburg, Maryland (location of MedImmune, where it will work on biotech drugs), and Gothenburg in Sweden, for research on traditional chemical drugs. AstraZeneca also announced that it would move its corporate headquarters from London to Cambridge in 2016. That announcement included the announcement that it would cut 1,600 jobs; three days later it announced it would cut an additional 2,300 jobs. It also announced that it would focus on three therapeutic areas: Respiratory Inflammation & Autoimmunity, Cardiovascular & Metabolic Disease, and Oncology. In October 2013, AstraZeneca announced it would acquire biotech oncology company Spirogen for around US$440 million.

==== 2014 ====
On 19 May 2014, AstraZeneca rejected a "final offer" from Pfizer of £55 per share, which valued the company at £69.4 billion (US$117 billion). The companies had been meeting since January 2014. If the takeover had proceeded, Pfizer would have become the world's biggest drug maker. The transaction would also have been the biggest foreign takeover of a British company. Many in Britain, including politicians and scientists, had opposed the deal. In July 2014 the company entered into a deal with Almirall to acquire its subsidiary Almirall Sofotec and its lung treatments including the COPD drug, Eklira. The US$2.1 billion deal included an allocation of US$1.2 billion for development in the respiratory franchise, one of AstraZeneca's three target therapeutic areas announced the year before. In August 2014 the company announced it had entered into a three-year collaboration with Mitsubishi Tanabe Pharma on diabetic nephropathy.

In September 2014, the company joined forces with Eli Lilly in developing and commercialising its candidate BACE inhibitor – AZD3292 – used for the treatment of Alzheimer's disease; this deal was projected to yield up to US$500 million AstraZeneca. In November 2014, the firm's biologics R&D operation, MedImmune, agreed to acquire Definiens for more than US$150 million. It also began a Phase I/II trial collaboration with Pharmacyclics and Janssen Biotech investigating combination treatments. Also in November, AstraZeneca agreed to sell its lipodystrophy treatment business to Aegerion Pharmaceuticals for more than US$325 million. In December, the company received accelerated FDA approval for Olaparib in the treatment of women with advanced ovarian cancer who have a BRCA genetic mutation. A major criterion governing the drugs approval was, on average, its ability to shrink tumours in patients for 7.9 months.

==== 2015 ====
In February 2015, AstraZeneca announced it would acquire the US and Canadian rights to Actavis's branded respiratory drug business for an initial sum of US$600 million. That same month, the company announced a partnership with Orca Pharmaceuticals to develop retinoic acid-related orphan nuclear receptor gamma inhibitors for use in the treatment of several autoimmune diseases, which could generate up to US$122.5 million for Orca. The company also announced its plan to spend US$40 million creating a new subsidiary focused on small molecule anti-infectives – primarily in the research of the gyrase inhibitor, AZD0914, which was then in Phase II testing for the treatment of gonorrhea. The company underwrote twenty out of thirty-two seats of a new Cambridge– Gothenburg service by Sun-Air of Scandinavia.

In March, the company stated that it would co-commercialise naloxegol along with Daiichi Sankyo in a deal worth up to US$825 million. In April, the firm announced a number of collaborations worth an estimated US$1.8 billion; first, to develop and commercialise MEDI4736, with Celgene, for use against non-Hodgkin's lymphoma, myelodysplastic syndromes, and multiple myeloma with AstraZeneca receiving US$450 million. The second of two deals is an agreement to study a combination treatment of MEDI4736 and Innate Pharma's Phase II anti-NKG2A antibody IPH2201 for up to US$1.275 billion. The company's MedImmune arm also launched collaborative clinical trials with Juno Therapeutics, investigating combination treatments for cancer; these trials involved combinations of MEDI4736 and one of Juno Therapeutics' CD19 directed chimeric antigen receptor T-cell candidates. In June, the company revealed a partnership with Eolas Therapeutics on the Eolas Orexin-1 Receptor Antagonist (EORA) program for smoking cessation and other treatments. In July, AstraZeneca announced the sale of its rights to Entocort (budesonide) to Tillotts Pharma for $215 million. In July, Genzyme announced it would acquire the rare cancer drug Caprelsa (vandetanib) from AstraZeneca for up to US$300 million.

In August, the company announced it had acquired the global rights to develop and commercialise Heptares Therapeutics' drug candidate HTL-1071, which focuses on blocking the adenosine A2A receptor, in a deal worth up to US$510 million. That same month, the company's MedImmune subsidiary acquired exclusive rights to Inovio Pharmaceuticals' INO-3112 immunotherapy under an agreement which could net more than US$727.5 million for Inovio. INO-3112 targets Human papillomavirus types 16 and 18. In September, Valeant licensed Brodalumab from the company for up to US$445 million. On 6 November, it was reported that AstraZeneca had acquired ZS Pharma for US$2.7 billion. In December, the company announced its intention to acquire the respiratory portfolio of Takeda Pharmaceutical – namely Alvesco and Omnaris – for US$575 million A day later, the company announced it had taken a 55% majority stake in Acerta Pharma for US$4 billion; the transaction included commercial rights to Acerta Pharma's irreversible oral Bruton's tyrosine kinase inhibitor, acalabrutinib (ACP-196), which under development at that time. In 2015, AstraZenica was the eighth-largest drug company in the world based on sales revenue.

==== 2017 ====
In July 2017, the company's CEO Pascal Soriot said that Brexit would not affect its commitment to its current plans in the United Kingdom. However, it had slowed decision making for new investment projects waiting for a post-Brexit regulatory regime to settle down. Two months later, the firm's chairman Leif Johansson planned in taking the "first steps" in moving its research and manufacturing operations away from the United Kingdom, if there is a hard Brexit. Soon after, executive vice president Pam Cheng stated that AstraZeneca had ignited startup of duplicate QA testing facility in Sweden and has initiated hiring in Sweden.

In 2017, it was the eleventh largest drug company in the world based on sales and ranked seventh based on R&D investment.

==== 2018 ====
In February 2018, AstraZeneca announced it was spinning off six early-stage experimental drugs into a new biotechnology company, known as Viela Bio, valued at US$250 million. On 6 December 2018, AstraZeneca purchased nearly 8% of the American pharmaceutical business, Moderna.

==== 2019 ====
In March 2019, AstraZeneca announced it will pay up to US$6.9 billion to work with Daiichi Sankyo Co Ltd on an experimental treatment for breast cancer. AstraZeneca plans to use some of the proceeds of a US$3.5 billion share issue to fund the deal. The deal on the drug known as trastuzumab deruxtecan sent shares in Japan's Daiichi soaring 16%.

In September 2019, the company announced that it would cease drug production at its German headquarters in Wedel, leading to the loss of 175 jobs by the end of 2021.

In October 2019, AstraZeneca announced it would sell the global commercial rights for its drug to treat acid reflux to German pharmaceutical company Cheplapharm Arzneimittel GmbH for as much as US$276 million.

==== 2020 ====
In February 2020, AstraZeneca agreed to sublicense its global rights (except Europe, Canada and Israel) to the drug Movantik, to Redhill Biopharma. In June 2020, AstraZeneca made a preliminary approach to Gilead Sciences about a potential merger, worth almost US$240 billion. However, these plans were subsequently dropped because it would have distracted the company from its own pipeline and ongoing COVID-19 vaccine efforts. In July 2020, the business entered into its second collaboration with Daiichi Sankyo, centred around the development of DS-1062, an antibody drug conjugate. The deal could potentially be worth up to US$6 billion for Daiichi. On 27 December 2020, AstraZeneca CEO Pascal Soriot said that it has "figured out the winning formula" with their two-dose system with the Oxford University’s COVID-19 vaccine. Three days later, the United Kingdom approved the emergency use of the Oxford–AstraZeneca COVID-19 vaccine.

==== 2021 ====
In July 2021, AstraZeneca acquired Alexion Pharmaceuticals. In October 2021, the company, through Alexion, acquired Caelum Biosciences and its monoclonal treatment (CAEL-101) for light chain (AL) amyloidosis for up to $500 million.

==== 2022 ====
In July 2022, the company announced it would acquire TeneoTwo for up to $1.3 billion, increasing its blood cancer drug offering. In October 2022, it was announced that it would acquire LogicBio Therapeutics, which was active in clinical-stage genomic medicine.

In November 2022, it was announced AstraZeneca had acquired the Amsterdam-headquartered clinical-stage biotechnology company, Neogene Therapeutics.

==== 2023 ====
In January, AstraZeneca announced it would acquire CinCor Pharma for $1.8 billion.

In November 2023, AstraZeneca launched a new global health tech business, Evinova, that focused on provide global services to CROs and pharma companies to design, run and monitor clinical trials.

In December 2023, AstraZeneca announced that it would acquire an RSV vaccine developer, Icosavax for $1.1 billion. Later that month, AstraZeneca agreed to acquire clinical-stage biopharmaceutical developer of cell therapies for the treatment of cancer and autoimmune diseases, Gracell Biotechnologies, in a deal valued at up to $1.2 billion. Both the acquisitions were completed in February 2024.

==== 2024 ====
In March 2024, AstraZeneca announced it would acquire Amolyt Pharma in exchange for $1.05 billion. That same month, the firm also announced the acquisition of Fusion Pharmaceuticals Inc for $2 billion in cash.

In July 2024, National Institute for Health and Care Excellence (Nice) blocked the National Health Service (NHS) from providing Enhertu, an innovative treatment for advanced HER2-low breast cancer, due to AstraZeneca and Daiichi Sankyo not offering a low enough price. Nice's decision, the first rejection of a breast cancer treatment in six years, highlighted the financial challenges of funding complex medicines, with Enhertu costing £117,857 per treatment course. Despite approval by the Medicines and Healthcare Regulatory Agency, Nice's non-recommendation meant the drug could only be available privately or under separate funding in Scotland. Clinical trials showed Enhertu extended patients' lives by five months compared to chemotherapy, but Nice and the companies could not agree on a new price.

In February 2024, the chief executive faced criticism from corporate governance experts and AstraZeneca investors regarding his excessive pay.

In December 2024, the company announced the appointment of Rene Haas and Birgit Conix to its board as non-executive directors. Both appointments will be effective from January 2025 and February 2025 respectively.

==== 2025 ====
In January 2025, the company announced the withdrawal of plans to expand its vaccine manufacturing site in Liverpool, England. In March 2025, the company told the UK Business and Trade Select Committee that the government failed to make a proposed £75 million grant by August 2025, saying "When the offer emerged in October of support to the tune of £75 million, that didn’t then support the revised business case with the new timelines sufficiently.".

In March 2025, AstraZeneca announced the acquisition of Belgian biotech company EsoBiotec for up to $1 billion to enhance its cancer treatment capabilities through EsoBiotec's in vivo cell therapy platform.

In July 2025, AstraZeneca announced plans to invest $50 billion in the United States by 2030.

==== 2026 ====
In January 2026, it was announced that AstraZeneca agreed to acquire Modella AI, a Boston-based artificial intelligence company, to support its oncology research and development activities. The acquisition expands an existing collaboration between the companies and is intended to integrate Modella AI’s data models and analytical tools into AstraZeneca’s clinical development and biomarker discovery efforts. Financial terms were undisclosed.

On January 20, 2026, the company was replaced by Walmart in the Nasdaq-100 index. Simultaneously, it was announced that the company's American depositary receipts will be delisted from the American Nasdaq exchange starting on January 30 and switch to the New York Stock Exchange with a direct listing of ordinary shares starting on February 2.

In July 2026, AstraZeneca entered into a licensing deal with CSPC Pharmaceutical Group worth up to $1.77 billion to discover and develop experimental medicines for kidney diseases. Under the agreement, CSPC would receive a $30 million upfront payment and up to approximately $1.74 billion in additional milestone payments tied to development and sales targets. AstraZeneca secured the option to obtain exclusive rights to develop, manufacture and commercialise one preclinical small nucleic acid drug candidate globally, and a second candidate outside China.

In August 2026, AstraZeneca held talks with Bristol Myers Squibb over a potential merger worth nearly $400 billion, but the deal ultimately did not go ahead.

In November 2026, AstraZeneca acquired Omniose, a United States-based biotechnology company developing vaccines against bacterial infections. Following the acquisition, Omniose's business was incorporated into AstraZeneca's infectious diseases division. Financial terms were not disclosed.

== Acquisition history ==
The following is an illustration of the company's major mergers and acquisitions and historical predecessors:

- AstraZeneca
  - AstraZeneca (Merged 1999)
    - Astra AB (Founded 1913)
      - Tika (Acq 1939)
    - Zeneca (Spun off from Imperial Chemical Industries, 1993)
      - Salick Health Care (Acq 1996)
      - Ishihara Sangyo Kaisha (US fungicide operations, Acq 1997)
  - KuDOS Pharmaceuticals (Acq 2005)
  - MedImmune Biologics
    - Cambridge Antibody Technology (Acq 2006)
      - Aptein Inc (Acq 1998)
    - MedImmune (Acq 2007)
      - Definiens (Acq 2014)
  - Arrow Therapeutics (Acq 2007)
  - Novexel Corp (Acq 2010)
  - Guangdong BeiKang Pharmaceutical Company (Acq 2011)
  - Ardea Biosciences (Acq 2012)
  - Amylin Pharmaceuticals (Acq 2012 jointly with Bristol-Myers Squibb)
  - Spirogen (Acq 2013)
  - Pearl Therapeutics (Acq 2013)
  - Omthera Pharmaceuticals (Acq 2013)
  - ZS Pharma (Acq 2015)
  - Alexion Pharmaceuticals (Acq 2021)
    - Proliferon Inc (Acq 2000, restructured into Alexion Antibody Technologies Inc)
    - Enobia Pharma Corp (Acq 2011)
    - Synageva BioPharma (Acq 2015)
    - Wilson Therapeutics (Acq 2018)
    - Syntimmune (Acq 2018)
    - Achillion Pharmaceuticals (Acq 2019)
    - Portola Pharmaceuticals (Acq 2020)
    - Caelum Biosciences (Acq 2021)
  - TeneoTwo (Acq 2022)
  - LogicBio Therapeutics (Acq 2022)
  - Neogene Therapeutics (Acq 2022)
  - CinCor Pharma (Acq 2023)
  - Icosavax (Acq 2024)
  - Gracell Biotechnologies (Acq 2024)
  - Amolyt Pharma (Acq 2024)
  - Fusion Pharmaceuticals Inc (Acq 2024)

== Operations ==
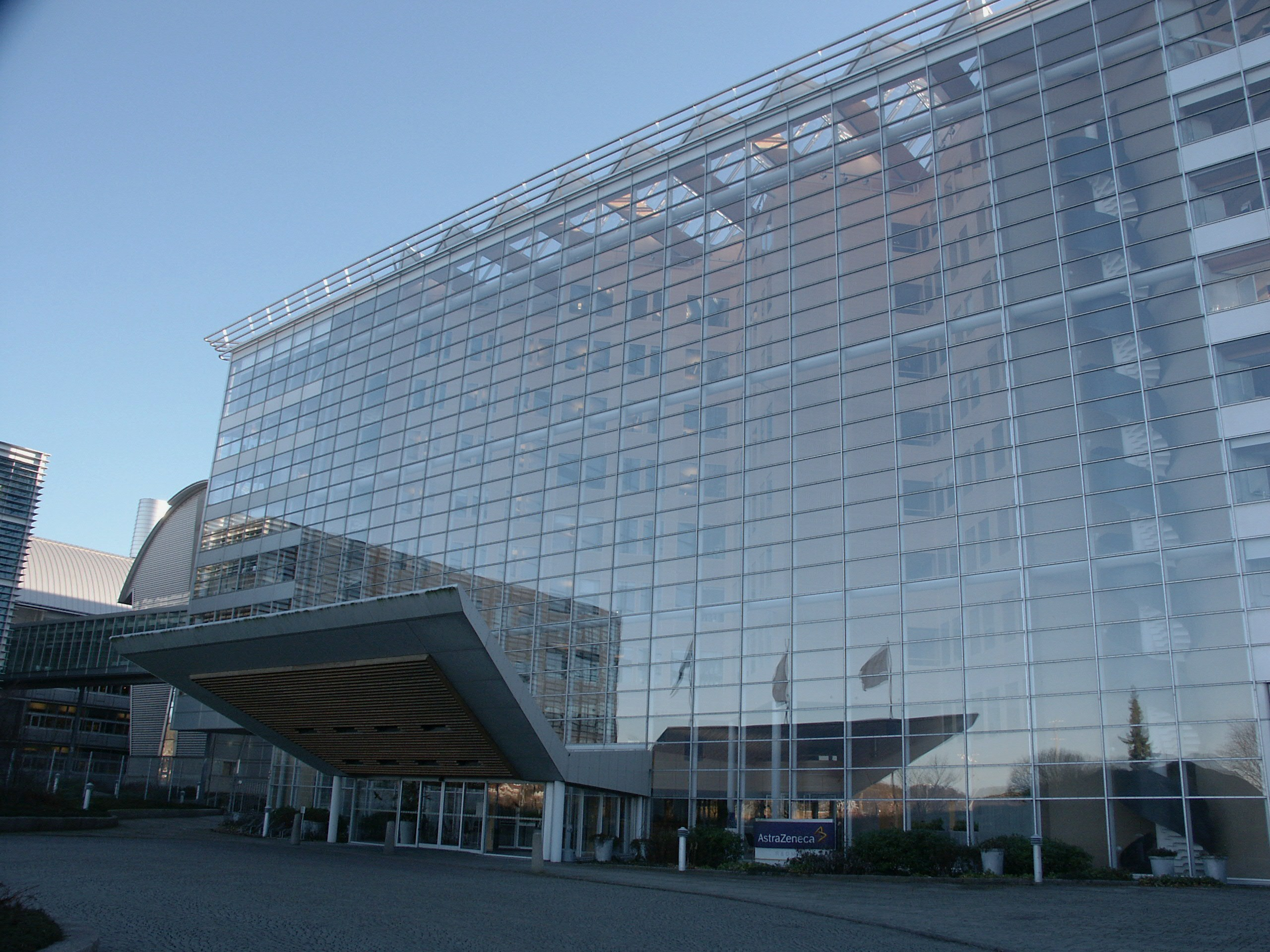
The AstraZeneca R&D facility in Mölndal near Gothenburg, Sweden

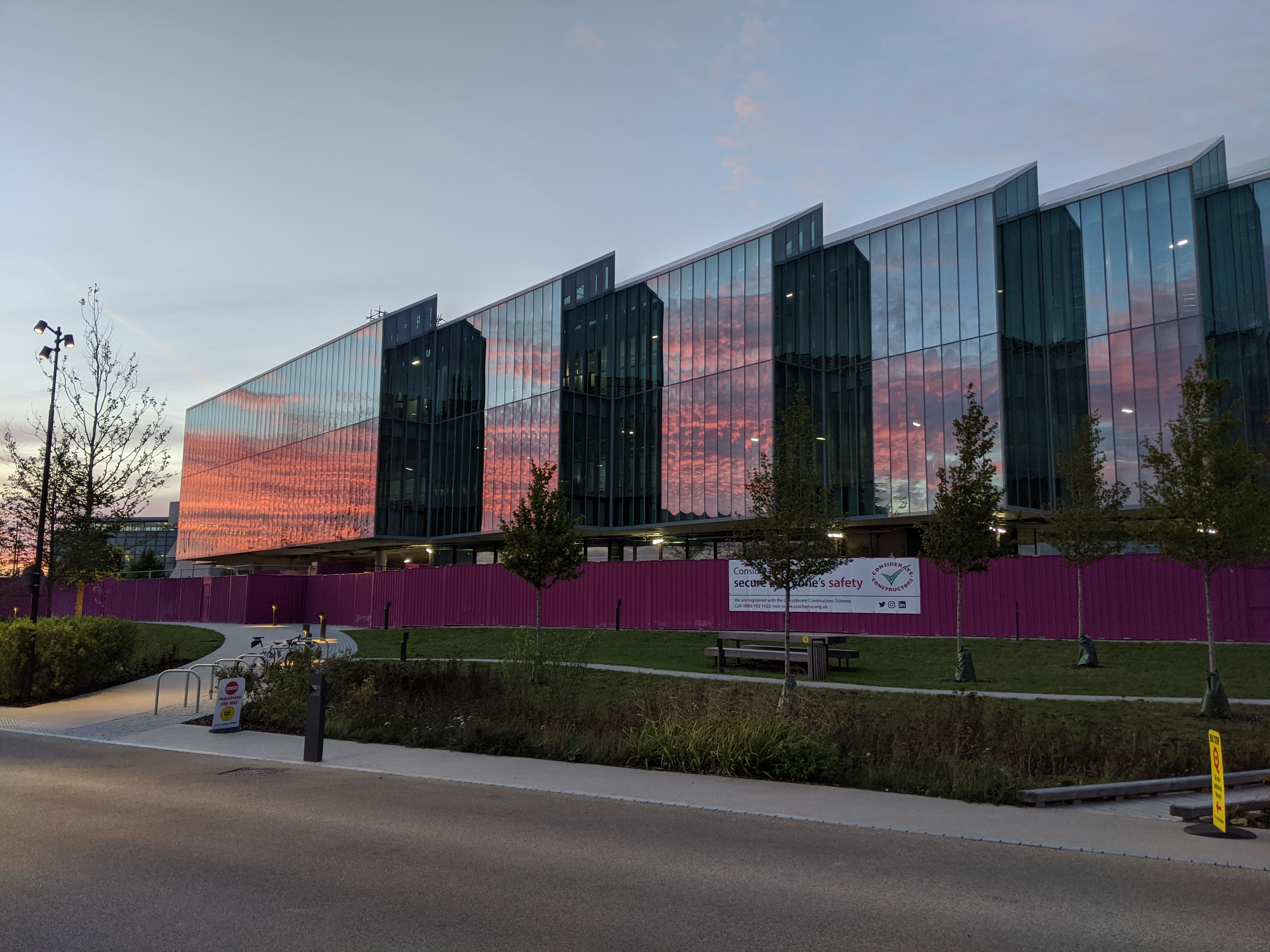
The new AstraZeneca Corporate HQ under construction in Cambridge, United Kingdom

AstraZeneca develops, manufactures and sells pharmaceutical and biotechnology products to treat disorders in the oncology, cardiovascular, gastrointestinal, infection, neuroscience, respiratory and inflammation areas.

AstraZeneca has its corporate headquarters in Cambridge, United Kingdom, and its main research and development (R&D) centres are in Cambridge (UK), Gaithersburg (Maryland, US), Mölndal in Gothenburg (Sweden), and Warsaw (Poland). In 2025 the company opened a new cell therapy manufacturing facility in Rockville, Maryland.

=== Headquarters ===
AstraZeneca's global headquarters are located in the Cambridge Biomedical Campus adjacent to Addenbrooke's Hospital in Cambridge, England. The facility, known as the Discovery Centre, was designed by Swiss architecture firm Herzog & de Meuron and officially opened by Prince Charles on the 23 November 2021. The building is designed to accommodate over 2,200 scientists across 16 laboratories covering approximately 19,000 square metres (200,000 sq ft). It was built at a cost of approximately £1 billion.

In September 2025, the Discovery Centre was shortlisted for the Stirling Prize.

=== Cambridge-Gothenburg flights ===
In 2015, AstraZeneca arranged for the establishment of a direct air route between Cambridge and Gothenburg, which began operation on 2 March 2015. The company reserved 20 of the 32 seats on each flight, with the remaining seats available to the public, which was operated by SUN-AIR for British Airways. The service connects AstraZeneca’s global headquarters in Cambridge with its research facility in Gothenburg. The service operated four days per week and was intended to support collaboration between staff in the two locations, allowing same-day travel for meetings. The route ended as a scheduled public service in 2016 due to insufficient demand, but these flights continue for AstraZeneca employees as of 2024.

== Orphan drugs ==
In April 2015, AstraZeneca's drug tremelimumab was approved as an orphan drug for the treatment of mesothelioma in the United States. In February 2016, AstraZeneca announced that a clinical trial of tremelimumab as a treatment for mesothelioma failed to meet its primary endpoint.

== Senior management ==
As of 2008, David Brennan was paid US$1,574,144 for his role as chief executive officer.

On 26 April 2012, it was announced that Brennan was to retire in early June of that year. In August 2012, Pascal Soriot was named CEO of AstraZeneca.

It was also announced that Leif Johansson would succeed Louis Schweitzer as non-executive chairman on 1 June 2012, three months earlier than previously announced, and would become Chairman of the Nomination and Governance Committee after the 2012 Annual General Meeting.

The company's non-executive Board directors are Philip Broadley, Euan Ashley, Michel Demaré, Deborah DiSanzo, Diana Layfield, Sheri McCoy, Tony Mok, Nazneen Rahman, Andreas Rummelt, and Marcus Wallenberg.

== Lobbying ==
=== Political lobbying ===
AstraZeneca is a member of the Personalized Medicine Coalition, a medical research advocacy group that lobbies on behalf of the pharmaceutical industry.

== Contentious treatments and related matters ==
=== Seroquel ===
In April 2010, AstraZeneca settled a qui tam lawsuit brought by Stefan P. Kruszewski for US$520 million to settle allegations that the company defrauded Medicare, Medicaid, and other government-funded health care programs in connection with its marketing and promotional practices for the blockbuster atypical antipsychotic, Seroquel. According to the settlement agreement, AstraZeneca targeted its illegal marketing of the anti-psychotic Seroquel towards doctors who do not typically treat schizophrenia or bipolar disorder, such as physicians who treat the elderly, primary care physicians, pediatric and adolescent physicians, and in long-term care facilities and prisons.

In March 2011, AstraZeneca settled a lawsuit in the United States totalling US$68.5 million to be divided up to 38 states.

=== Nexium ===
The company's most commercially successful medication is esomeprazole (Nexium). The primary uses are treatment of gastroesophageal reflux disease, treatment and maintenance of erosive esophagitis, treatment of duodenal ulcers caused by Helicobacter pylori, prevention of gastric ulcers in those on chronic NSAID therapy, and treatment of gastrointestinal ulcers associated with Crohn's disease. When it is manufactured the result is a mixture of two mirror-imaged molecules, R and S. Two years before the omeprazole patent expired, AstraZeneca patented S-omeprazole in pure form, pointing out that since some people metabolise R-omeprazole slowly, pure S-omeprazole treatment would give higher dose efficiency and less variation between individuals. In March 2001, the company began to market Nexium, as it would a brand new drug.

The (R)-enantiomer of omeprazole is metabolized exclusively by the enzyme CYP2C19, which is expressed in very low amounts by 3% of the population. Treated with a normal dose of the enantiomeric mixture, these persons will experience blood levels five-times higher than those with normal CYP2C19 production. In contrast, esomeprazole is metabolized by both CYP2C19 and CYP3A4, providing less-variable drug exposure. While omeprazole is approved only at doses of up to 20 mg for the treatment of gastroesophageal reflux, esomeprazole is approved for doses up to 40 mg.

In 2007, Marcia Angell, former editor-in-chief of the New England Journal of Medicine and a lecturer in social medicine at the Harvard Medical School, said in Stern, a German-language weekly newsmagazine, that AstraZeneca's scientists had misrepresented their research on the drug's efficiency, saying: "Instead of using presumably comparable doses [of each drug], the company's scientists used Nexium in higher dosages. They compared 20 and 40 mg Nexium with 20 mg Prilosec. With the cards having been marked in that way, Nexium looked like an improvement – which however was only small and shown in only two of the three studies."

=== Bildman fraud, sexual harassment and faithless servant clawback ===
On 4 February 1998, Astra USA sued Lars Bildman, its former president and chief executive officer, seeking US$15 million for defrauding the company. The sum included US$2.3 million in company funds he allegedly used to fix up three of his homes, plus money the company paid as the result of the EEOC investigation. Astra's lawsuit alleged Bildman sexually harassed and intimidated employees, used company funds for yachts and sex workers, destroyed documents and records, and concocted: "tales of conspiracy involving ex-KGB agents and competitors. This was in a last-ditch effort to distract attention from the real wrongdoer, Bildman himself." Bildman had already pleaded guilty in US District Court for failing to report more than US$1 million in income on his tax returns. In addition, several female co-workers filed personal sexual-harassment lawsuits against Bildman. In April 1998, Bildman was sentenced to 21 months in prison three months after he pled guilty to filing false Federal tax returns.

In February 1998, AstraZenaca's U.S. affiliate Astra U.S.A. agreed to a $10 million settlement after an Equal Employment Opportunity Commission investigation which started in May 1996 found that sexual harassment against female employees. 120 former female employees of Astra were interviewed during the inquiry, with about 80 of them being identified as able to file claims. Astra U.S.A. also issued a statement of apology for the hostile work environment.

In Astra USA v. Bildman, 914 N.E.2d 36 (Mass. 2009), applying New York's faithless servant doctrine, the court held that a company's employee who had engaged in financial misdeeds and sexual harassment must "forfeit all of his salary and bonuses for the period of disloyalty". The court held that this was the case even if the employee "otherwise performed valuable services", and that the employee was not entitled to recover restitution for the value of those other services. The decision attracted a good deal of attention by legal commentators.

=== CAFÉ study ===
In 2004, University of Minnesota research participant Dan Markingson took his own life while enrolled in an industry-sponsored pharmaceutical trial comparing three FDA-approved atypical antipsychotics: Seroquel (quetiapine), Zyprexa (olanzapine), and Risperdal (risperidone). University of Minnesota Professor of Bioethics Carl Elliott noted that Markingson was enrolled in the study against the wishes of his mother, Mary Weiss, and that he was forced to choose between enrolling in the study or being involuntarily committed to a state mental institution. A 2005 FDA investigation cleared the university. Nonetheless, controversy around the case has continued after a Mother Jones article was published.

=== Transfer mispricing ===
In February 2010, AstraZeneca agreed to pay £505 million to settle a UK tax dispute related to transfer mispricing.

=== Conflicting commitments to the UK and the EU over COVID-19 vaccines ===
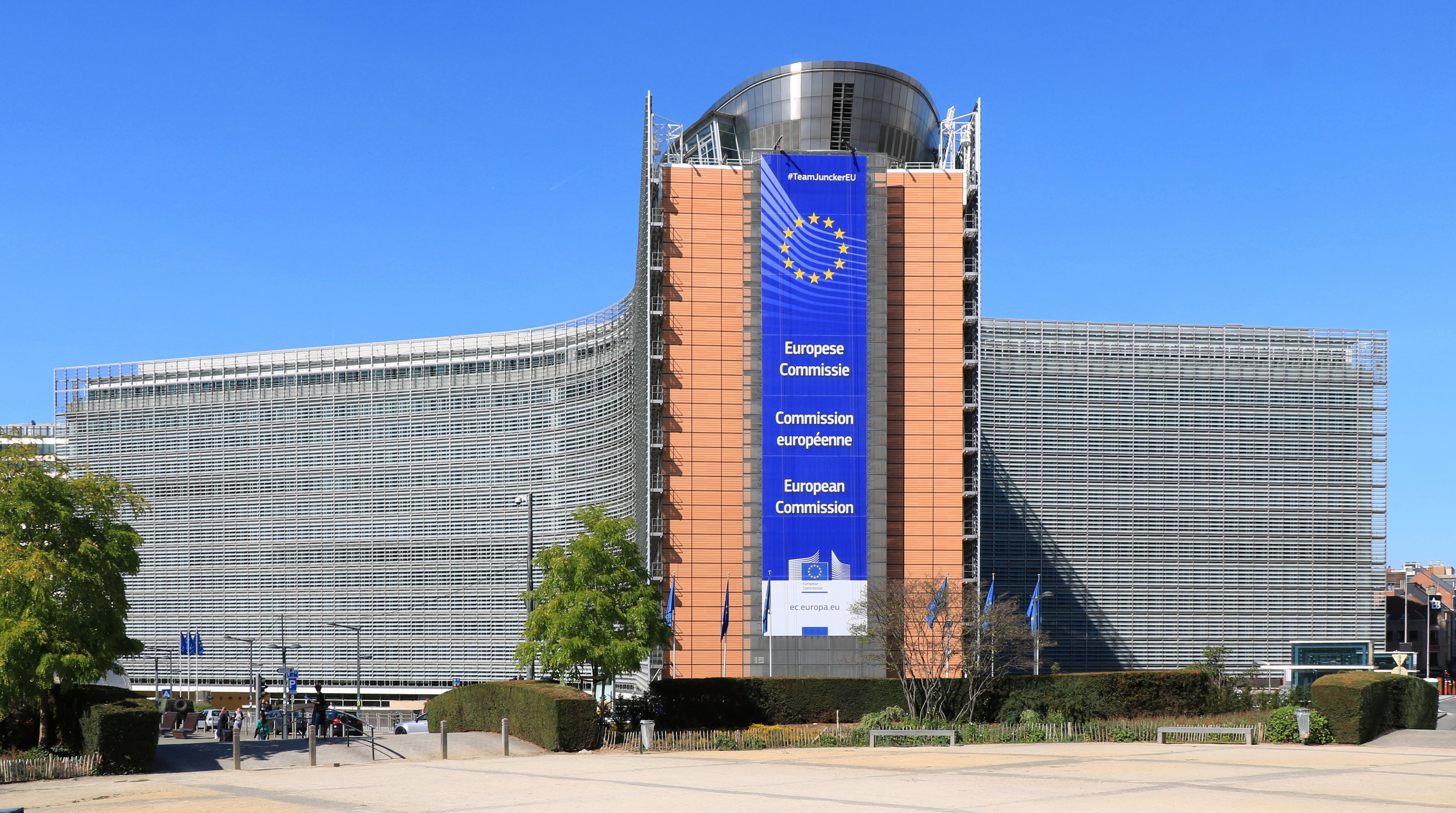
Seat of the European Commission, which negotiated a contract with AstraZeneca

In August 2020, AstraZeneca made an advance purchase agreement with the European Commission and the EU member states for the supply of COVID-19 vaccines:

"13.1. AstraZeneca represents, warrants and covenants to the Commission and the Participating Member States that: [...] (e) it is not under any obligation, contractual or otherwise, to any Person or third party in respect of the Initial Europe Doses or that conflicts with or is inconsistent in any material respect with the terms of this Agreement or would impede the complete fulfilment of its obligation under this Agreement;"

However, the UK Secretary of State for Health and Social Care, Matt Hancock, declared in March 2021 that the United Kingdom had been given "exclusivity" and that the EU's treaty was "inferior". After placing the order for AstraZeneca's vaccine, the European Commission mistakenly assumed that it had enough vaccines and initially ordered only 200 million doses from Pfizer–BioNTech when the manufacturers offered 500 million doses to the EU in November 2020.

However, the contract that AstraZeneca reached with the UK was very similar to that it reached with the EU, and it also contained the phrase "best reasonable efforts"; the UK contract was signed on 28 August 2020, a day after the contract with the EU. The key difference seems to be that AstraZeneca entered into a preliminary agreement with the U.K. back in May 2020 which arranged for "the development of a dedicated supply chain for the U.K." The failure to produce the vaccine in the anticipated quantities contributed to the low vaccination rates of vulnerable populations of the European Union at the beginning of the outbreak of more virulent variants of SARS-CoV-2 in early 2021.

=== Operations in China and investigation ===
AstraZeneca's reputation in China was tarnished when its Chinese subsidiary did not quickly donate to relief efforts after the 2008 Sichuan earthquake. Typically, donations for disaster relief in China are made through funds established through the Chinese Ministry of Civil Affairs and its subordinate organization, the Red Cross Society of China. AstraZeneca had a corporate rule prohibiting foreign subsidiaries from making donations to local governments, and the company construed this rule as prohibiting donations for Sichuan earthquake relief efforts. AstraZeneca's Chinese subsidiary suffered a major backlash for its failure to donate. Corporate approval was eventually given for the Chinese subsidiary to donate, but only after a long delay.

During the early 2020s, AstraZeneca expanded its R&D pipeline within China, increasing its investment in the country; the firm also signed licensing agreements with nine separate biotech firms in China that have been collectively valued at $6.5 billion.

In May 2023, AstraZeneca's China president, Leon Wang, stated that the company aimed to be a "patriotic" company in China that "loves the Communist Party." On 30 October 2024, AstraZeneca said that Wang was under investigation by Chinese authorities and had been detained. The China business is now being run by Michael Lai, the general manager.

In November 2024, it was announced that Chinese officials had widened their investigation under a national anti-corruption campaign targeting healthcare. Among the allegations, former AstraZeneca employees are accused of falsifying genetic tests to secure reimbursement for the company’s lung cancer drug, Tagrisso. Several current and former company executives are also being investigated for potentially breaching data privacy laws and for the suspected illegal importation of certain cancer drugs – likely including Enhertu, Imfinzi and Imjudo – from Hong Kong.

=== Operations in Russia ===
Following Russia's invasion of Ukraine in 2022, AstraZeneca faced criticism for maintaining its operations and continuing certain clinical trials in Russia, despite promising to halt new investments in the country. While several international pharmaceutical companies announced suspensions of new clinical studies in Russia after the conflict began, AstraZeneca moved forward with a study for a new COVID-19 prevention drug, essential for its registration in Russia.

== See also ==
- Pharmaceutical industry in the United Kingdom
- List of pharmaceutical companies
