= Cheplapharm Arzneimittel =

German pharmaceutical company

Cheplapharm
- Type: Gesellschaft mit beschränkter Haftung (GmbH)
- Industry: Pharmaceutical
- Founded: July 1998
- Headquarters: Mesekenhagen, Germany
- Area served: Worldwide
- Key people: Sebastian F. Braun (CEO); Bianca Y. Juha (CSO); Edeltraud Lafer (COO); Jens Rothstein (CFO)
- Products: prescription medications over-the-counter drugs and other medical products
- Revenue: Euro 223 million (2017)
- Number of employees: 500 (July 2021)
- Parent: Braun Beteiligungs GmbH
- Website: www.cheplapharm.com

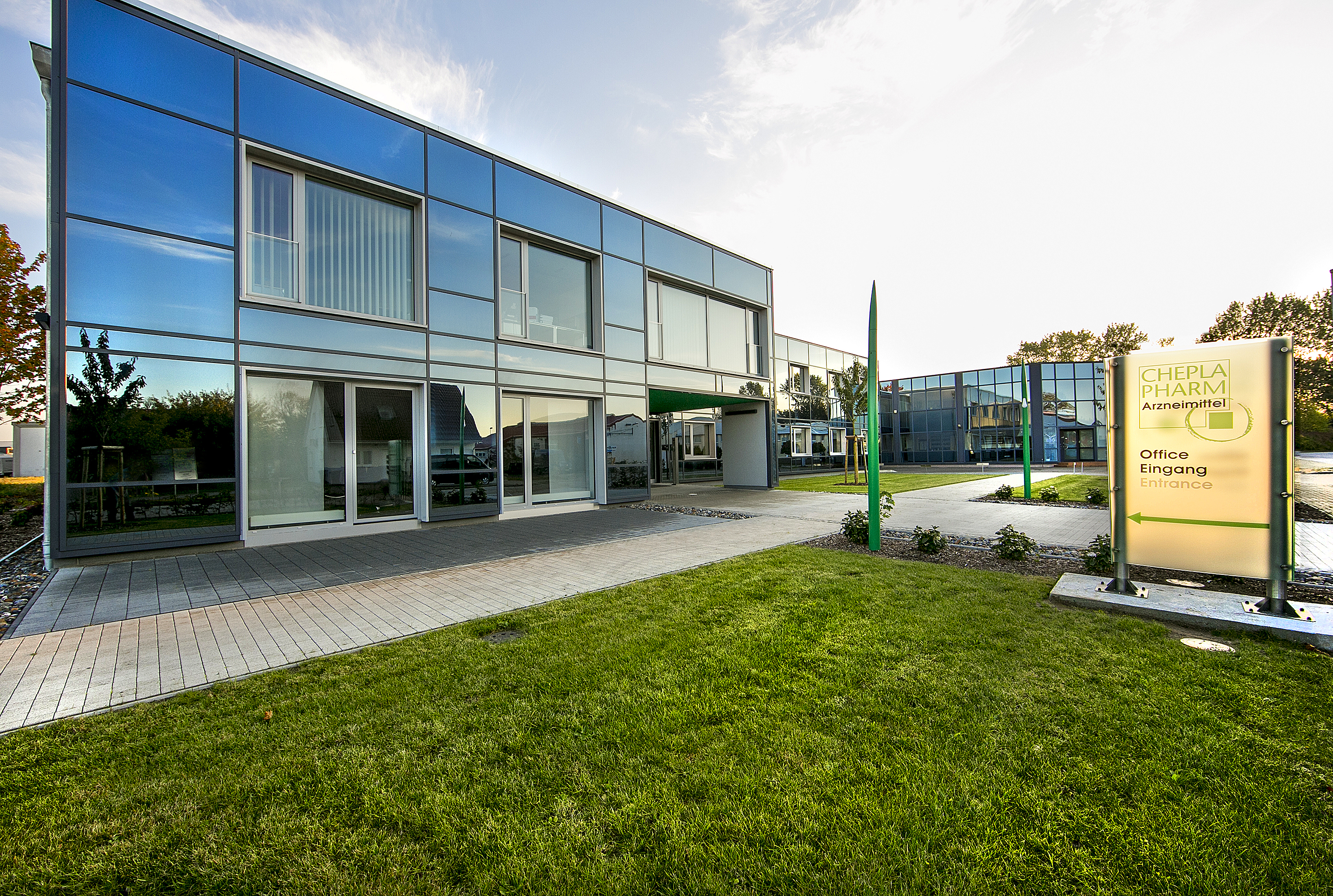
Cheplapharm building in a business park in Greifswald

Cheplapharm Arzneimittel GmbH, headquartered in Greifswald, is a German pharmaceutical company that markets branded drugs, medical products, supplements and cosmetics.

Cheplapharm is among the most notable small and medium-sized enterprises (SME) in the federal state of Mecklenburg-Western Pomerania, and part of Braun Beteiligungs GmbH, a family owned business conglomerate that is among that state's 25 biggest employers. Subsidiaries of the company are located in Hamburg, Levallois-Perret (France) and Englewood, New Jersey.

Cheplapharm acts as a divestment partner for various large pharmaceutical companies. Since its foundation in 1998, Cheplapharm has acquired exclusive rights for more than 80 drugs and other pharmaceutical products that their developers intended to divest for economic or strategic reasons, generating yearly double-digit growth rates with this international “buy and build“ strategy. As of 2018, the company holds more than 400 pharmaceutical product registrations in over 120 countries worldwide.

== History ==
The company was founded 1998 in Freiburg by Kurt Teubner, who had been working as a manager for Ciba Geigy (now Novartis). The name Cheplapharm derives from the plant based diuretic Cheplaren, one of the first products Teubner acquired.

In 2003, Cheplapharm was bought by the Braun family. The new proprietors moved operations to Mesekenhagen, where Norbert and Dagmar Braun owned another pharmaceutical company, Riemser AG, a spin-off of the Friedrich Loeffler Institute. Their son Sebastian F. Braun assumed the CEO position at Cheplapharm.

Over the years, Cheplapharm has acquired the rights to more than 80 branded pharmaceuticals and medical products from multinational and German pharmaceutical companies. Among them are large corporations like Merck, F. Hoffmann-La Roche, AstraZeneca, Sanofi, Boehringer Ingelheim and Johnson & Johnson as well as midsize businesses like Grünenthal, Klosterfrau or Riemser. Key acquisitions were those of Heminevrin/Distraneurin (a sedative used to treat acute alcohol withdrawal), from AstraZeneca, in 2010, Rohypnol (a hypnotic) and Vesanoid (a leukemia medication, both from F. Hoffmann-La Roche, in 2012), Deursil/Ursolvan (an anti-gallstone medication, from Sanofi in 2014), Dilatrend (a beta blocker), Xenical (an anti-obesity medication) and Anexate (a benzodiazepine antagonist, all three from F. Hoffmann-La Roche in 2016), Konakion and Cymevene (a vitamin K supplement and a virostatic, from F. Hoffmann-La Roche in 2018), Visudyne (a photosensitizer used for photodynamic therapy of the wet form of macular degeneration, from Novartis in 2018) and Sotacor/Sotalex (an antiarrhythmic, from Bristol-Myers Squibb in 2018).

In 2017, Cheplapharm signed a distributorship agreement with an Orexigen Therapeutics subsidiary to market Mysimba, a combination drug for weight loss, in Germany, France and Austria. Cheplapharm also markets several over-the-counter remedies of local renown or niche appeal in Germany. Among them are Reisegold (an antiemetic with Dimenhydrinate, marketed specifically for motion sickness), the valerian extract-based sedative Baldrian Dispert, and a number of herbal tinctures from the 'Thüringer' brand formerly owned by Klosterfrau.

Cheplapharm has expanded its operations by taking over the pharma companies Walter Ritter GmbH & Co., Hamburg (2008), Sanavita Pharmaceuticals, Werne (2012) and Glenwood LCC, New Jersey (2014). The latter company's main product is Potaba, an urological drug. The French subsidiary Cheplapharm France SAS, located in Levallois-Perret, was established in 2016.

In 2017, Cheplapharm founded a joint venture with the German medical technology company Clearum. The venture, by the name of Med-Tec Holding GmbH, is meant to focus on manufacture of medical technology products, research and development. Construction of a new production facility near Rostock has been announced to start in July 2018.

In 2020, the company invested in product portfolios from Takeda and Leo Pharma. The Takeda portfolio, which comprises 17 products, was the company's largest acquisition to date in terms of scope and purchase price (EUR 450 million). In 2021, all rights to the epilepsy drug Rivotril were acquired from Roche, and Astellas took over the approvals for four branded antibiotics and De Nol, a drug against Helicobacter pylori infections, for Russia, Ukraine and other CIS countries.

== Products ==
Cheplapharm owns global or local marketing and distribution rights for a number of prescription drugs that are used in cardiology (Dilatrend, Aldactone, Inhibace, Sotalex/Sotacor, Pertenso, Dopegyt, Natrilix, Vascal), haematooncology (Vesanoid), urology (Potaba), gastroenterology and bariatrics (Deursil/Ursolvan, Cotazym, Xenical, Mysimba), emergency medicine (Anexate), addiction medicine (Heminevrin/Distraneurin), sleep medicine (Rohypnol, Aponal), infection control (Cymevene, Lariam) and ophthalmology (Visudyne).

The company also markets over-the-counter drugs for common health issues (e.g. antiemetics, antacids, antidiarrhoeals, cardiovascular remedies, painkillers, sedatives) and medical products, among them dietary supplements, hot-cold-packs, cold sprays and dermatological care products.
