= Leif Johansson (businessman) =

Swedish businessman (born 1951)

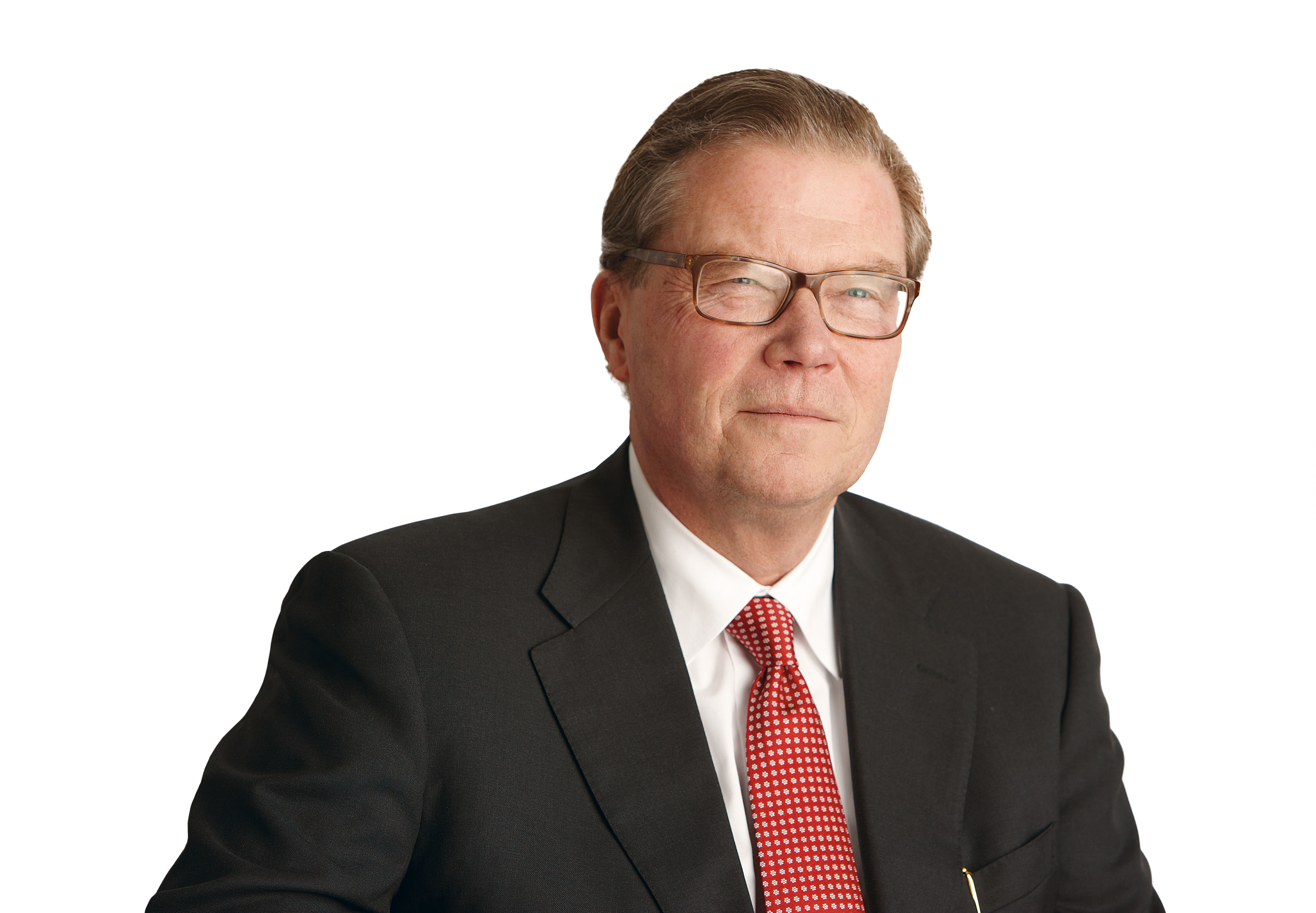
- Leif Johansson in 2014
- Born: Leif Valdemar Johansson; August 30, 1951 (age 74); Gothenburg, Sweden
- Education: Chalmers University of Technology
- Title: Chairman of AstraZeneca plc; President and CEO of Volvo Group (1997–2011); Chairman of Ericsson (2011–2017)
- Spouse: Eva Johansson
- Children: 5

Leif Valdemar Johansson (born 30 August 1951) is a Swedish businessman. He was President and CEO of the Volvo Group from 1997 to 2011 and Chairman of Ericsson from 2011 until 2017 and is currently Chairman of AstraZeneca plc. In 2012, the Fokus Magazine ranked him as Sweden's 6th most powerful person.

== Background ==
Johansson was born on August 30, 1951, in Gothenburg, Sweden. His father was Lennart Johansson, for many years President of the SKF Group (1971-1985). He and his wife Eva have five children.

== Education ==
- 1958-1971 primary education, Gothenburg
- 1968 Chatsworth High School, Chatsworth, California
- 1971 matriculation, natural sciences, Kjellbergska Gymnasiet, Gothenburg
- 1972 Sergeant, Swedish Air Force
- 1977 Master of Science in Mechanical Engineering, Chalmers University of Technology, Gothenburg

== Career ==
Johansson has worked in Swedish industry for most of his professional life. He assumed his first position as Managing Director in 1978 (age of 27), at Husqvarna Motorcycles. In 1982 he became President of Facit, an office machines manufacturer, followed by ten years with white-goods manufacturer Electrolux where he eventually advanced to the position of CEO. In 1997 Johansson was appointed President and CEO of Volvo in Gothenburg, a position he held until 2011.

1974-76 project consultant, Indevo
1977 product developer and assistant to the President, Centro-Maskin
1979 President of Husqvarna Motorcycles
1981 Divisional Manager Office Machines, Facit Sweden
1982 President of Facit
1984 Divisional Manager, AB Electrolux, Appliances
1987 President of AB Electrolux, Appliances
1988 Vice President, AB Electrolux
1991 President of AB Electrolux
1994 CEO, Electrolux
1997 President and CEO, Volvo Group
2011 Chairman, Ericsson

== Other assignments ==
Chairman of the Board: AstraZeneca Pharmaceuticals LP
Member of the Board: Bristol-Myers Squibb Company, Svenska Cellulosa Aktiebolaget (SCA), Confederation of Swedish Enterprise
Member of Royal Swedish Academy of Engineering Sciences (IVA)
Chairman ERT European Round Table of Industrialists

== Awards ==
- 1977 Marcus Wallenberg ASEA Award
- 2001 H. M. The King's Medal 12th size in the Ribbon of the Royal Order of the Seraphim
- 2005 The Royal Automobile Club's Gold Memorial Medal
- 2005 Knight of the National Order of the Legion of Honour, France
- 2006 Honorary Doctor at the Blekinge Institute of Technology
- 2007 Honorary Doctor of Medicine at the University of Gothenburg
- 2009 The Mekanprisma Award
- 2013 Officer of the Legion of Honour

== Volvo Group ==
The Volvo Group is one of the world's largest suppliers of commercial vehicles with products such as trucks, buses, construction equipment, drive systems for marine and industrial applications, and aircraft engine components. The Volvo Group also offers its customers financial services. Today the Group has customers in more than 180 countries worldwide, mainly in Europe, Asia and North America. The Group has about 100,000 employees and production facilities in 19 countries.

Decisions adopted under Johansson's leadership:
1998 Acquisition of Samsung's excavator operation, South Korea
1999 Sale of Volvo Cars to Ford Motor Company
2001 Acquisition of Renault Trucks, France, and Mack Trucks, USA
2006 Acquisition of Nissan Diesel, Japan
2007 Acquisition of Ingersoll Rand's road construction machinery division, USA
2008 Agreement on joint venture company with Eicher Motors, India
