= Zoliflodacin =

Chemical compound

- Skeletal structure of zoliflodacin

- Ball-and-stick model of zoliflodacin

Clinical data
- Trade names: Nuzolvence
- Other names: AZD0914; ETX0914
- AHFS/Drugs.com: Monograph
- MedlinePlus: a626017
- License data: US DailyMed: Zoliflodacin
- Routes of administration: By mouth
- Drug class: Antibacterial
- ATC code: None

Legal status
- Legal status: US: ℞-only

Pharmacokinetic data
- Bioavailability: 97.8%
- Metabolism: Liver
- Onset of action: Fasted: 1.5–2.3 h; Fed: 4 h
- Elimination half-life: 5.3–6.3 h
- Excretion: Feces (79.6%); Urine (18.2%)

Identifiers
- IUPAC name: (2'R,4'S,4'aS)-11'-fluoro-2',4'-dimethyl-8'-[(4S)-4-methyl-2-oxo-1,3-oxazolidin-3-yl]-1',2',4',4'a-tetrahydro-6'H-spiro[1,3-diazinane-5,5'-[1,4]oxazino[4,3-a][1,2]oxazolo[4,5-g]quinoline]-2,4,6-trione
- CAS Number: 1620458-09-4
- PubChem CID: 76685216
- DrugBank: DB12817
- UNII: FWL2263R77
- KEGG: D11726
- ChEMBL: ChEMBL3544978

Chemical and physical data
- Formula: C_{22}H_{22}FN_{5}O_{7}
- Molar mass: 487.444 g·mol^{−1}
- 3D model (JSmol): Interactive image
- SMILES: C[C@@H]1CN2[C@H]([C@@H](O1)C)C3(CC4=C2C(=C5C(=C4)C(=NO5)N6[C@H](COC6=O)C)F)C(=O)NC(=O)NC3=O
- InChI: InChI=1S/C22H22FN5O7/c1-8-7-33-21(32)28(8)17-12-4-11-5-22(18(29)24-20(31)25-19(22)30)16-10(3)34-9(2)6-27(16)14(11)13(23)15(12)35-26-17/h4,8-10,16H,5-7H2,1-3H3,(H2,24,25,29,30,31)/t8-,9+,10-,16+/m0/s1; Key:ZSWMIFNWDQEXDT-ZESJGQACSA-N

Zoliflodacin, sold under the brand name Nuzolvence, is an antibiotic used for the treatment of antibiotic-resistant Neisseria gonorrhoeae (gonorrhea). Zoliflodacin is a spiropyrimidinetrione bacterial type II topoisomerase inhibitor. Zoliflodacin is being developed as part of a public-private partnership between Innoviva Specialty Therapeutics and the Global Antibiotic Research & Development Partnership (GARDP). Zoliflodacin is taken by mouth.

The most common side effects include low white blood cell counts, headache, dizziness, nausea, and diarrhea.

Zoliflodacin was approved for medical use in the United States in December 2025. The US Food and Drug Administration considers it to be a first-in-class medication.

== Medical uses ==
Zoliflodacin is indicated for the treatment of uncomplicated urogenital gonorrhea due to Neisseria gonorrhoeae in people who weigh at least 35 kilograms (77 lb).

=== Susceptible bacteria ===
Zoliflodacin has shown in vitro activity against the following species of bacteria: Staphylococcus aureus, Streptococcus pneumoniae, Haemophilus influenzae, Moraxella catarrhalis, Neisseria gonorrhoeae, and Chlamydia trachomatis

== Adverse effects ==
Animal studies showed that zoliflodacin might cause birth defects, pregnancy loss, or male fertility problems.

== Mechanism of action ==
Zoliflodacin is a spiropyrimidinetrione antibacterial agent (first-in-class) that inhibits bacterial type II topoisomerases, including DNA gyrase and topoisomerase IV. It binds to these enzymes at a site that is distinct from fluoroquinolone binding sites, leading to inhibition of DNA replication and bacterial cell death. This novel mechanism confers activity against strains resistant to other topoisomerase inhibitors and involves inhibition of bacterial type II topoisomerases.

== History ==
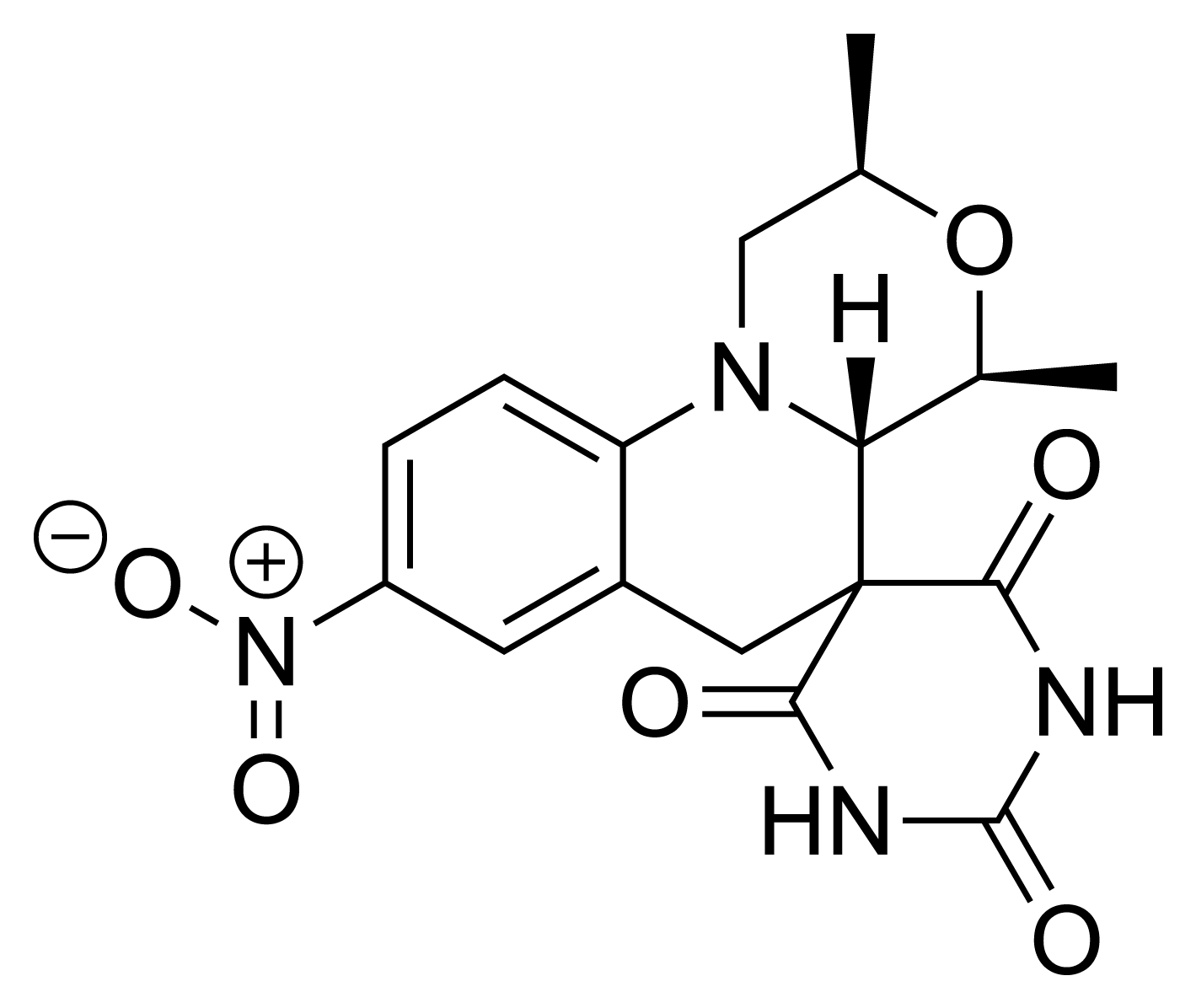
Compound PNU-286607, discovered in a high-throughput screen for compounds with antibiotic activity.

A high throughput screening campaign aimed at identifying compounds with whole cell antibacterial activity performed at Pharmacia & Upjohn identified compound PNU-286607, a progenitor of Zoliflodacin, as having the desired activity.

Subsequent research at AstraZeneca led to the discovery that the nitroaromatic in PNU-286607 could be replaced with a fused benzisoxazole ring, which allowed for an exploration of different groups at the 3-position of the heterocycle. This work was continued at Entasis Pharmaceuticals where extensive optimization resulted in the discovery of ETX0914.

Researchers tested zoliflodacin in a study with 930 participants who had uncomplicated urogenital gonorrhea. Two-thirds of participants received a single 3-gram dose of zoliflodacin dissolved in water. The other third received the standard treatment of ceftriaxone shot plus azithromycin pill. The study measured how well the medicines cleared the bacteria 4 to 8 days after treatment. The study showed 91% of participants who took zoliflodacin were cured and 96% of participants who received the standard treatment were cured.

== Society and culture ==
=== Legal status ===
Zoliflodacin was approved for medical use in the United States in December 2025.

The US Food and Drug Administration (FDA) granted the application for zoliflodacin fast track, qualified infectious disease product, and priority review designations for the uncomplicated urogenital gonorrhea indication. The FDA approval for Nuzolvence was granted to Entasis Therapeutics.

=== Names ===
Zoliflodacin is the international nonproprietary name.

Zoliflodacin is sold under the brand name Nuzolvence.
