= David Barnes (industrialist) =

British industrialist

Sir James David Francis Barnes, CBE (4 March 1936 – 4 March 2020) was a British industrialist. He was a senior executive of ICI (formerly Imperial Chemical Industries), then headed Zeneca (later AstraZeneca).
