= Astra AB =

Swedish multinational pharmaceutical company

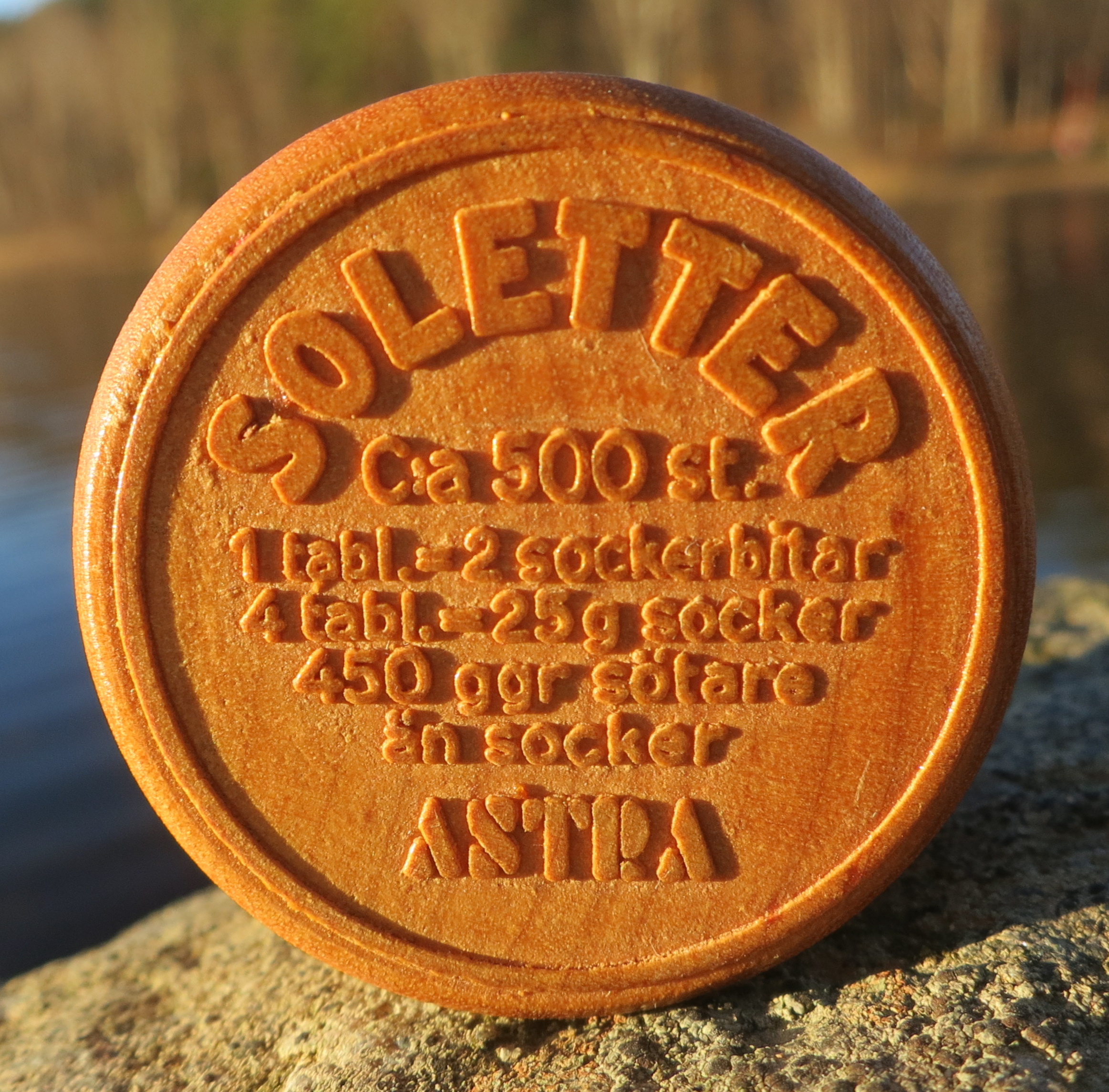
1950s or 1960s wooden tin for Astra's saccharin-based artificial sweetener Soletter

Astra AB was a former international pharmaceutical company headquartered in Södertälje, Sweden. Astra was formed in 1913 and merged with the British Zeneca Group in 1999 to form AstraZeneca. Zeneca shareholders received 53.5% of the shares, while Astra shareholders received the remaining 46.5%. Product development was focused on therapeutics for gastrointestinal, cardiovascular and respiratory disorders and pain control. At the time of the merger, Astra was the largest Swedish pharmaceutical company. Astra also operated Astra Tech, a medical devices company, and marketed pharmaceuticals outside their primary development area, including anti-infective agents.

== History ==
The issue of domestic industrial production of pharmaceuticals in Sweden, as opposed to manual preparations by pharmacists, had been discussed among Swedish pharmacists since mid-1890s. At this time, German and Swiss pharmaceutical companies dominated the Swedish market. For a long time, this never led to more than discussions, but in 1913 Astra was founded in Södertälje, and plans to produce some 40 pharmaceutical preparations were already drawn up. Pharmacist Knut Sjöberg became the first CEO of the company.

In 1918, dye-producer AB Svensk färgämnesindustri (ASF) bought Astra. ASF planned to create a large Swedish chemical group rivaling those in continental Europe. However, ASF was unsuccessful, and the company soon had large financial problems and was liquidated in 1920. Astra was bailed out and acquired by the Swedish government through its monopoly liquor-producing company Vin- & Spritcentralen, with the intention to form a national monopoly for pharmaceutical production. These plans met with resistance, and therefore a Swedish merchant, Erik Kistner, formed a consortium which bought debt-ridden Astra back from the government for a symbolic price of one krona. The consortium included banker Jacob Wallenberg, and the Wallenberg family since continued to have a stake in the company.

Under long-serving CEO Börje Gabrielsson, who led the company until 1957, Astra showed profit from 1929 and grew continuously. In the 1930s, Astra started to conduct its own research, initially on a very small scale, rather than just manufacturing existing pharmaceutical preparations. The sulfa drug Sulfathiazole was one of the results of these research activities. The company Tika was acquired in 1939, and the pharmaceutical factories of Paul G. Nordström in Hässleholm (later renamed to Hässle, and operated as a division of Astra) in 1942. This established Astra as the leading Swedish pharmaceutical company.

In the 1940s, two product families were established which were to become quite important to Astra: penicillin and anaesthetics, initially in the form of Xylocain, which was introduced on the Swedish market in 1948.

The profits from these product families funded the development of new drugs. Many of the drugs which were introduced by Astra from the 1960s originated with its Hässle division, which had been relocated from Hässleholm to Gothenburg in 1954 in order to facilitate collaboration with University of Gothenburg and its Faculty of Medicine. Among the scientists involved in collaboration with Astra in Gothenburg was later Nobel Prize laureate Arvid Carlsson. In the same vein, Astra Draco was founded in Lund, where Lund University was located. The research at Hässle led to a number of Astra drugs against cardiovascular conditions including Aptin in 1967 and Seloken in 1975. Another highly successful and profitable Hässle product was Losec against gastroesophageal conditions, introduced in 1988.

A drug which hadn't been developed by Astra, but that the company distributed in Sweden under its own name under the designation Neurosedyn, which was a prescription-free sedative. It was developed in Germany by Grünenthal under the name Contergan and was also sold under the name Thalidomide in other countries. In late 1961 this drug was connected to a number of birth defects in Germany and was withdrawn from the German market. Three weeks later Astra's Neurosedyn was withdrawn in Sweden, after having been on the market slightly less than three years. It turned out that around one hundred Swedish children had suffered deformation from their mothers taking the supposedly safe drug during their pregnancies, as the Swedish part of the wider Thalidomide scandal affecting around 10,000 worldwide. After complicated legal turns in the 1960s, a settlement was reached in 1969, whereby Astra set aside certain compensation funds for the victims. This turn of events led to a revision of safety thinking in drug development, and to date it is still considered as the worst tragedy and scandal in the history of the Swedish pharmaceutical industry.

In 1983 Astra withdrew its neuropharmacological drug Zelmid, which had only introduced the year before, because of concerns over side effects. Zelmid was a selective serotonin reuptake inhibitor (SSRI), and although Astra was a pioneer in the SSRI area, they did not follow up with another drug using the same mechanism. Instead, it was the US pharmaceutical company Eli Lilly and Company which later introduced the bestselling SSRI drug Prozac, which led Astra to realise that they would probably had been able to beat Lilly to this lucrative market if they had continued their SSRI drug development. Despite losing out in the SSRI area, in the 1990s, Astra had become one of the heaviest companies on the Stockholm stock exchange, to a large extent due to profits from Losec.

Responding to increasing development costs of new drugs and a perception that the pharmaceutical industry needed more international mergers, Astra started to look for partners. On December 9, 1998, plans for a merger with Zeneca was announced, which would create the world's third largest pharmaceutical company. Despite some initial criticism of the plans, owners representing 96.4% of the stock voted for the merger, which was effected in 1999.
