= Zeneca =

British multinational pharmaceutical company

Zeneca Group plc
- Trade name: Zeneca
- Type: Public limited company
- Traded as: LSE: ZN; Nasdaq: ZN
- Industry: Pharmaceutical
- Founded: 1993
- Defunct: 1999; 27 years ago
- Fate: Merged with Astra AB
- Successor: AstraZeneca
- Headquarters: London, England, UK
- Products: Pharmaceutical products

Zeneca Group plc, trading as Zeneca, was a British multinational pharmaceutical company headquartered in London, England. It was formed in June 1993 by the demerger of the pharmaceuticals and agrochemicals businesses of Imperial Chemical Industries into a separate company listed on the London Stock Exchange.

In 1999, Zeneca and the Sweden-based pharmaceutical company Astra AB merged to form AstraZeneca plc. Zeneca shareholders received 53.5% of the shares, while Astra shareholders received the remaining 46.5%.

Zeneca's largest therapeutic area was oncology, in which its key products included Casodex, Nolvadex and Zoladex. Other key products included heart drug Tenormin.

== Name ==
"Zeneca" was an invented name created by the branding consultancy Interbrand. Interbrand had been instructed to find a name which began with a letter from either the top or bottom of the alphabet and was phonetically memorable, of no more than three syllables and did not have an offensive meaning in any language.

== History ==
In December 1994, Zeneca agreed the acquisition of 50% of Salick Health Care, an operator of cancer care centres in the United States, in a transaction which valued Salick at US$440 million. Zeneca announced the sale of its textile colours business to the German group BASF in May 1996. Zeneca announced it would purchase the remaining 50% of Salick Health Care that it did not already own on 28 March 28, 1997. In December 1997, Zeneca acquired the US fungicide operations of Ishihara Sangyo Kaisha, along with the international distribution rights to four recently developed fungicides, herbicides and pest control products, for US$500 million.

In May 1998, Zeneca announced that Tom McKillop, then the head of its drugs division, would succeed Sir David Barnes as chief executive, with Barnes becoming non-executive chairman of the company. In November 1998, Zeneca announced that it would sell its Zeneca Specialties division, including its biocides, industrial colours, life science molecules, performance and intermediate chemicals and resins activities. On 11 December 1998, Zeneca and Astra AB announced a £48 billion merger. In February 1999, it was reported that Zeneca would sue the US Food and Drug Administration over its decision to allow Gensia Sicor to produce a generic version of its anaesthetic Diprivan. The merger between Zeneca and Astra AB was completed in April 1999, forming AstraZeneca plc.

== See also ==
- Pharmaceutical industry in the United Kingdom
