= List of DTT channels in the United Kingdom =

== Overview ==
This is a list of the current channels available on digital terrestrial television (DTT) in the United Kingdom, and those that have been removed.

Almost all channels broadcast on DTT are free-to-air, with a limited number of subscription channels (requiring a subscription to a pay-TV package) and pay-per-view channels (requiring a one-off payment to view an event) also available. Most free-to-air channels are promoted as part of the Freeview line-up.

The vast majority of multiplexed channels use DVB-T 64-QAM modulation, for PAL (576i), radio and interactive channels. HDTV (1080i) channels use DVB-T2 256-QAM modulation and H.222 transports, while local channels (Note: (on the LTVmux)) use DVB-T QPSK modulation. All HD channels are encoded in H.264 and subject to a MPEG-LA controlled transmission patent licensing tax which is included in the Freeview broadcaster cost and varies on viewership figures. This tax is currently paid via one of three registered licensees: the BBC, ITV and Sky plc. The SD channels continue to use H.262, which does not incur any additional transmission costs.

Below is an overview of the multiplexes in use:

- The PSB1 transport (operating name BBC A) is used solely for the standard definition PSB (public service broadcasting) services of the BBC.
- The PSB2 transport (operating name D3&4) carries only standard definition versions of both the commercial broadcasters' PSB services and some of their commercial services.
- The PSB3 transport (operating name BBC B) is used for HDTV versions of most of the BBC and commercial PSB services.
- The COM4 (operating name SDN), COM5 (operating name ARQ A) and COM6 (operating name ARQ B) transports, which are only transmitted from main transmission sites, carry only standard definition commercial services.
- LTVmux is a series of localised transports at certain transmitter sites carrying local and nationwide channels. Its availability is much less than that of the commercial COM transports. In addition to this, the NImux transport (operating name RNI_1) is only available in parts of Northern Ireland, and the GImux transport (operating name G_MAN) is only available in Greater Manchester.

== Channel sections ==
Abbreviations include:

- Eng = England
- Scot = Scotland
- Wales = Wales
- NI = Northern Ireland
- CI = the Channel Islands
- GrLdn = Greater London and surrounding areas
- GrMcr = Greater Manchester and surrounding areas
- Limited = Only available to all viewers using Freeview HD or Freeview Play equipment

=== General Entertainment ===
The channel numbers on Freeview (as of 18 November 2026) are as follows:

NorDig LCN (SD)	DVB name	Notes	Licensee	Parent Company	Broadcast hours	Timeshares	H.222 Transport	Format
1	BBC One	13 regional variations for England, with variations in programming for Scotland, Wales and Northern Ireland. BBC iPlayer via the Red Button on internet-connected devices.	BBC		24 hours		PSB1	16:9 SDTV
2	BBC Two	Some variations in programming for Wales and Northern Ireland. BBC iPlayer via the Red Button on internet-connected devices.	BBC		24 hours		PSB1	16:9 SDTV
3	ITV1 / STV	ITV network, made up of 15 regional stations. Branded ITV1 or STV, depending on location.	ITV Network Ltd	ITV plc/STV Group plc	24 hours		PSB2	16:9 SDTV
4 (Eng, Scot & NI)	Channel 4		Channel Four Television Corporation		24 hours		PSB2	16:9 SDTV
4 (Wales)	S4C	Programmes in Welsh (Cymraeg).	S4C Authority		24 hours		PSB2	16:9 SDTV
5	5	Formerly known as Channel 5 and Five.	Channel 5 Broadcasting Limited	Skydance Corporation	24 hours		PSB2	16:9 SDTV
6	ITV2		ITV2 Limited	ITV plc	24 hours		PSB2	16:9 SDTV
7 (Eng & NI)	Local TV	See 'General entertainment: Local TV variations' section for information about Local TV / That's TV, etc.	Various		24 hours		LTVmux	16:9 SDTV
7 (Scot)	BBC Alba	Programmes in Scottish Gaelic (Gàidhlig). BBC iPlayer via the Red Button on internet-connected devices.	BBC/MG Alba		17:00 – 00:00 (Monday – Friday); 16:00 – 01:00 (Saturday); 16:00 – 00:00 (Sunday)	Timeshares with BBC Radio 1, BBC Radio 2, BBC Radio 3, BBC World Service and BBC Radio nan Gàidheal.	PSB1	16:9 SDTV
7 (Wales)	Channel 4		Channel Four Television Corporation		24 hours		PSB2	16:9 SDTV
8 (parts of Eng, Scot & Wales)	Local TV	For Local TV / That's TV stations in parts of England, Scotland and Wales, see section below.	Various		24 hours		LTVmux	16:9 SDTV
9 (Eng, Wales & NI)	BBC Four	BBC iPlayer via the Red Button on internet-connected devices.	BBC		19:00 – 06:00	Timeshares with CBeebies.	PSB1	16:9 SDTV
9 (Scot)	BBC Scotland	BBC iPlayer via the Red Button on internet-connected devices.	BBC		12:00 – 00:00		PSB1	16:9 SDTV
10	ITV3		ITV Digital Channels Limited	ITV plc	24 hours		PSB2	16:9 SDTV
11	Sky Mix	On 18 October 2023, Pick (on LCN 36) was replaced by Sky Mix and moved to this LCN, and Sky Arts moved from this LCN to LCN 36.	Sky UK Limited	Sky Group	24 hours		COM5	16:9 SDTV
12	TLC	Formerly HGTV. Channel launched on Freeview on 13 January 2026.	Skydance Corporation		24 hours		COM6	16:9 SDTV
13	E4		Channel Four Television Corporation		24 hours		PSB2	16:9 SDTV
14	Film4		Channel Four Television Corporation		24 hours		PSB2	16:9 SDTV
15	Channel 4 +1	1 hour timeshift of Channel 4.	Channel Four Television Corporation		24 hours		PSB2	16:9 SDTV
16	QVC	Access to QVC Beauty, QVC Style, QVC Extra & QVC +1 available via the red button on compatible devices connected to the internet. QVC+ is only available on most internet-connected TVs built in 2017 and later. Older internet-connected TVs are incompatible with QVC+ and will continue using the previous service. Since October 2024, selected newer internet-connected TVs are no longer compatible with QVC+ and have reverted to the previous service.	QVC UK TV Inc; Gemporia Craft; Hobby Create and CraftTV; Shop Unlimited and Craft Unlimited		24 hours		COM4	16:9 SDTV
17	Quest		Skydance Corporation		24 hours		COM6	16:9 SDTV
18	More4		Channel Four Television Corporation		24 hours		PSB2	16:9 SDTV
19	U&Dave		UKTV Media Limited	BBC Studios	24 hours		COM5	16:9 SDTV
20	U&Drama		UKTV Media Limited	BBC Studios	24 hours		COM4	16:9 SDTV
21	5USA		Channel 5 Broadcasting Limited	Skydance Corporation	24 hours		COM4	16:9 SDTV
22	TJC	This channel changed places with Ideal World, becoming the first channel swap permitted under new Freeview guidelines.	Gemporia Craft; Hobby Create and Craft TV; Shop Unlimited and Craft Unlimited		24 hours		COM4	16:9 SDTV
23 (Eng, CI & NI)	BBC Three HD	HD version here and SD version on channel 613 (England, Channel Islands and Northern Ireland), or for those with pre-2021 Freeview Play devices, SD version remains here. BBC iPlayer via the Red Button on internet-connected devices.	BBC		19:00 – 06:00	Timeshares with CBBC HD.	PSB3	1080i/1080p HDTV
23 (Scot & Wales)	BBC Three (SD)	BBC Three HD not available in Scotland and Wales. BBC iPlayer via the Red Button on internet-connected devices.	BBC		19:00 – 06:00	Timeshares with CBBC (SD).	PSB1	16:9 SDTV
24 (Scot)	BBC Four	BBC iPlayer via the Red Button on internet-connected devices.	BBC		19:00 – 06:00	Timeshares with CBeebies.	PSB3	16:9 SDTV
25	U&W		UKTV Media Limited	BBC Studios	24 hours		COM4	16:9 SDTV
26	ITV4		ITV2 Limited	ITV plc	24 hours		PSB2	16:9 SDTV
27	U&Yesterday		UKTV Media Limited	BBC Studios	24 hours		COM6	16:9 SDTV
28	ITV Quiz	Formerly ITVBe.	ITV2 Limited	ITV plc	24 hours		PSB2	16:9 SDTV
29	ITV2 +1	1 hour timeshift of ITV2.	ITV2 Limited	ITV plc	24 hours		PSB2	16:9 SDTV
30	E4 +1	1 hour timeshift of E4.	Channel Four Television Corporation		24 hours		PSB2 (England, Scotland, Northern Ireland and CI); COM4 (Wales)	16:9 SDTV
31	E4 Extra		Channel Four Television Corporation		24 hours		PSB2	16:9 SDTV
32	5Star		Channel 5 Broadcasting Limited	Skydance Corporation	24 hours		COM4	16:9 SDTV
33	5Drama		Channel 5 Broadcasting Limited	Skydance Corporation	24 hours		PSB3	16:9 SDTV
34	Great! TV		Narrative Entertainment UK Limited		24 hours		COM6	16:9 SDTV
35 (except CI)	ITV1 +1 / STV +1	1 hour timeshift of the ITV network; made up of 13 regional variations. Branded ITV1 +1 or STV +1 depending on location.	ITV Network Ltd	ITV plc/STV Group plc	24 hours		PSB2	16:9 SDTV
36	Sky Arts	On 18 October 2023, Pick (on this LCN) was replaced by Sky Mix and moved to LCN 11, and Sky Arts moved from LCN 11 to this LCN.	Sky UK Limited	Sky Group	24 hours		COM5	16:9 SDTV
37	QVC2	24 hours on internet connected televisions, with access to QVC, QVC Beauty, QVC Extra & QVC Style via the red button.	QVC UK TV Inc; Gemporia Craft; Hobby Create and CraftTV; Shop Unlimited and Craft Unlimited		19:00 – 13:00		COM4	16:9 SDTV
38	5 +1	1 hour timeshift of 5.	Channel 5 Broadcasting Limited	Skydance Corporation	24 hours		COM4	16:9 SDTV
39	DMAX		Skydance Corporation		24 hours		COM6	16:9 SDTV
40	Quest Red		Skydance Corporation		24 hours		COM5	16:9 SDTV
41	Legend	Formerly the Horror Channel.	CBS AMC Networks UK Channels Partnership; Skydance Corporation & AMC Networks		24 hours		COM4	16:9 SDTV
42	Great! Action		Narrative Entertainment UK Limited		24 hours		COM4	16:9 SDTV
43	Food Network		Skydance Corporation		24 hours		COM5	16:9 SDTV
44	Really		Skydance Corporation		24 hours		COM5	16:9 SDTV
45	Gemporia	Formerly Gems TV.	Gemporia Limited; Gemporia Craft; Hobby Create and CraftTV; Shop Unlimited and Craft Unlimited		24 hours		COM5	16:9 SDTV
46	5Action		Channel 5 Broadcasting Limited	Skydance Corporation	24 hours		COM4	16:9 SDTV
47	Film4 +1	1 hour timeshift of Film4.	Channel Four Television Corporation		24 hours		PSB2	16:9 SDTV
48	Challenge		Sky UK Limited	Sky Group	24 hours		COM5	16:9 SDTV
49	4seven		Channel Four Television Corporation		24 hours		PSB2	16:9 SDTV
50	Great! Mystery		Narrative Entertainment UK Limited		24 hours		COM6	16:9 SDTV
51	Ideal World	Relaunched on 29 September 2023, after going into administration.	Gemporia Craft; Hobby Create and CraftTV; Shop Unlimited and Craft Unlimited		24 hours		COM6	16:9 SDTV
52	Great! Christmas	Great! Romance rebrands as Great! Christmas during the festive period (usually from mid-September to mid-January).	Narrative Entertainment UK Limited		24 hours		COM6	16:9 SDTV
53 (NI)	TG4	Programmes in Irish (Gaeilge).	Teilifís na Gaeilge		24 hours		NImux	16:9 SDTV
54 (NI)	RTÉ One		RTÉ		24 hours		NImux	16:9 SDTV
55 (NI)	RTÉ2		RTÉ		24 hours		NImux	16:9 SDTV
56	That's TV (UK)	A simulcast of the 24-hour local channel(s) without the local news between 6am and 4am (see "General entertainment: Local TV variations" for more information).	That's Media Ltd		06:00 – 04:00		COM6	16:9 SDTV
57 (limited)	U&Eden	On 16 October 2024, U&Yesterday +1 (on LCN 74) was replaced by U&Eden and moved to this LCN, and U&DaveJaVu moved from this LCN to LCN 74. Only available to viewers using Freeview Play or Freeview HD televisions.	UKTV Media Limited	BBC Studios	24 hours		PSB3	16:9 SDTV
58	ITV3 +1	1 hour timeshift of ITV3.	ITV Digital Channels Limited	ITV plc	24 hours		COM4	16:9 SDTV
59	ITV4 +1	1 hour timeshift of ITV4.	ITV2 Limited	ITV plc	24 hours		PSB2	16:9 SDTV
60	U&Drama +1	1 hour timeshift of U&Drama.	UKTV Media Limited	BBC Studios	24 hours		COM5	16:9 SDTV
61	Great! TV +1	1 hour timeshift of Great! TV. Streams on internet connected devices, except 03:00 – 05:00.	Narrative Entertainment UK Limited		03:00 – 05:00		COM6	16:9 SDTV
62	Great! Player	Streams on internet connected devices, except 03:00 – 05:00.	Narrative Entertainment UK Limited		03:00 – 05:00		COM6	16:9 SDTV
63	Lucky Cat TV	New channel launched 18 November 2026			24 hours		COM5	16:9 SDTV
64	Blaze		A&E Television Networks UK; A&E Networks & Sky Limited		05:00 – 02:00		COM4	16:9 SDTV
65	That's TV 2	Also 24 hours a day in Manchester on channel 85.	That's Media Ltd		06:00 – 04:00		COM6	16:9 SDTV
66 (limited)	TBN UK	Only available to viewers using Freeview Play or Freeview HD TV.	Governance Ministries; Trinity Broadcasting Network		24 hours		PSB3	16:9 SDTV
67	True Crime		CBS AMC Networks UK Channels Partnership; Skydance Corporation & AMC Networks		24 hours		COM4	16:9 SDTV
68	True Crime Xtra		CBS AMC Networks UK Channels Partnership; Skydance Corporation & AMC Networks		24 hours		COM4	16:9 SDTV
69 (limited)	Legend Xtra	Formerly HorrorXtra.	CBS AMC Networks UK Channels Partnership; Skydance Corporation & AMC Networks		24 hours		PSB3	16:9 SDTV
70	Quest +1	1 hour timeshift of Quest.	Skydance Corporation		24 hours		COM5	16:9 SDTV
71 (limited)	your TV		That's Media Ltd		24 hours		LTVmux	16:9 SDTV
72	Jewellery Maker	Also available 13:00 – 17:00 on channel 73.	Gemporia Limited; Gemporia Craft; Hobby Create and CraftTV; Shop Unlimited and Craft Unlimited		08:00 – 13:00		COM6	16:9 SDTV
73	HobbyMaker	Previously Shopping Quarter, this channel includes programme blocks for channels such as: HobbyCraftTV, Gemporia Craft Lifestyle, Gem Collector and Sewing Street.	Gemporia Limited; Gemporia Craft; Hobby Create and CraftTV; Shop Unlimited and Craft Unlimited		24 hours		COM6	16:9 SDTV
74 (limited)	U&DaveJaVu	1 hour timeshift of U&Dave. On 16 October 2024, U&Yesterday +1 (on this LCN) was replaced by U&Eden and moved to LCN 57, and U&DaveJaVu moved from LCN 57 to this LCN.	UKTV Media Limited	BBC Studios	24 hours		LTVmux	16:9 SDTV
75	your Christmas		That's Media Ltd		10:00 – 22:00		COM4	16:9 SDTV
76 (limited)	your Oldies		That's Media Ltd		24 hours		LTVmux	16:9 SDTV
77 (limited)	your 80s	Placeholder channels.	That's Media Ltd		24 hours		LTVmux	16:9 SDTV
78 (limited)	your Rock	Placeholder channels.	That's Media Ltd		24 hours		LTVmux	16:9 SDTV
79 (GrMcr)	That's TV MCR	Mancunian simulcast of That's TV.	That's Media Ltd		24 hours		GImux	16:9 SDTV
80 (GrMcr)	That's TV 2 MCR	Mancunian simulcast of That's TV 2.	That's Media Ltd		24 hours		GImux	16:9 SDTV
81	Rewind TV	This channel launched on Freeview on 18 September 2024.	Rewind TV Ltd		24 hours		COM6	16:9 SDTV
82	Talking Pictures TV		Talking Pictures TV Ltd		24 hours		COM6	16:9 SDTV
83 (Eng, Scot & NI)	Together TV	Available 24 hours with a smart TV. Together TV's HD service can also be found on some internet-enabled devices on LCN 285.	The Community Channel		18:00 – 00:00		COM4	16:9 SDTV
84	PBS America		PBS UK LLC		13:00 – 00:00		COM6	16:9 SDTV
85 (GrMcr)	your TV MCR	Mancunian simulcast of your TV.	That's Media Ltd		24 hours		GImux	16:9 SDTV
86 (GrMcr)	Blimey!		That's Media Ltd		24 hours		GImux	16:9 SDTV
87 (GrMcr)	TV Warehouse		ShowBiz TV & Media Ltd		24 hours		GImux	16:9 SDTV
88 (GrMcr)	TV Warehouse +1	1 hour timeshift of TV Warehouse.	ShowBiz TV & Media Ltd		24 hours		GImux	16:9 SDTV
89 (Eng, Scot & NI)	Shop on TV	The channel also broadcasts a shopping strand overnight on ITV1 and STV, from around Midnight to 3:00am (to 6:00pm otherwise).	Shop on TV Limited		24 hours		COM4	16:9 SDTV
90	Together TV +1	1 hour timeshift of Together TV. Streams on internet connected devices, except 05:00 – 08:00.	The Community Channel		05:00 – 08:00		COM6	16:9 SDTV
91	WildEarth	This channel launched on Freeview on 21 June 2023, causing Together TV +1 to move to channel 90. Also found via Rakuten TV, Samsung TV Plus, Roku and Plex.	WildEarth		24 hours		COM4	16:9 SDTV
92	Blaze +1	1 hour timeshift of Blaze.	A&E Television Networks UK	A&E Networks & Sky Limited	03:00 – 04:00		COM4	16:9 SDTV
93	That's Classics		That's Media Ltd		04:00 – 06:00		COM5	16:9 SDTV
94	SonLife	Also available on streaming channel 263.	Jimmy Swaggart Ministries		24 hours		COM5	16:9 SDTV
95 (limited)	High Street TV		High Street TV (Group) Limited		24 hours		LTVmux	16:9 SDTV
96	Must Have Ideas	This channel launched on Freeview on 1 August 2025.	Must Have Ideas Ltd		24 hours		COM5	16:9 SDTV
97	Shop Unlimited	Formerly Hobbycraft TV	Gemporia Craft; Hobby Create and CraftTV; Shop Unlimited and Craft Unlimited		24 hours		COM6	16:9 SDTV
98	wedotv Movies UK	38 channels available (as of 2 September 2026): Adventure Earth - Authentic History - Authentic Travel - AWE Plus - Brat TV - China Travel - Daystar - Daystar Espania - Deluxe Lounge HD - Discovering China - Euronews English - 5-Minute Crafts - Glory - Intravel - Inworld - Inwonder - Legacy - Love ThePlanet - Love Wine - Motor Racing - Movie Music by Stingray - Nolly Africa - OAN Plus - 1+1 News - OUTflix Proud - Piel salvaje - Time2rix - Trace Brasil - Trace Latina - Trace Sport Stars - Trace Urban - Trailers - wedotv Amor - wedotv Big Stories - wedotv Cars - wedotv Movies - WPT - XITE Hits	wedotv / Video Solutions		24 hours		COM5	16:9 SDTV
99 (limited)	TLC +1	1 hour timeshift of TLC.	Skydance Corporation		24 hours		LTVmux	16:9 SDTV
100	Freeview	Information page.	DTV Services Ltd		24 hours		PSB2	Text service
613 (Eng, CI & NI)	BBC Three (SD)	BBC iPlayer via the Red Button on internet-connected devices.	BBC		19:00 – 06:00	Timeshares with CBBC (SD).	PSB1	16:9 SDTV

==== General entertainment: Local TV variations ====
These regional channels are licensed by Ofcom under the Local Digital Television Programme, with That's TV currently broadcasting as a semi-national network (one which also uses the That's Christmas/That's New Year name over festive periods) with local opt-outs and a service streaming to the whole country via the VisionTV platform on channel 264 and as That's TV on Freeview channel 56. Local Television Limited has eight licences in the United Kingdom branded as Local TV with the channels being a simulcast of True Crime for most of the day.

NorDig LCN	DVB name	Notes	Licensee/ Parent Company	Broadcast hours	H.222 Transport	Format
7	KMTV	Maidstone and surrounding areas.	KMTV Ltd	24 hours	LTVmux	16:9 SDTV
7	Latest TV	Brighton and surrounding areas.	Latest TV Ltd	24 hours	LTVmux	16:9 SDTV
7	Birmingham TV	Birmingham and surrounding areas.	Local Television Limited	24 hours	LTVmux	16:9 SDTV
7	Bristol TV	Bristol and surrounding areas.	Local Television Limited	24 hours	LTVmux	16:9 SDTV
7	Leeds TV	Leeds and surrounding areas.	Local Television Limited	24 hours	LTVmux	16:9 SDTV
7	Liverpool TV	Liverpool and surrounding areas.	Local Television Limited	24 hours	LTVmux	16:9 SDTV
7	Teesside TV	Middlesbrough, Teesside and surrounding areas.	Local Television Limited	24 hours	LTVmux	16:9 SDTV
7	Tyne & Wear TV	Tyne & Wear and surrounding areas.	Local Television Limited	24 hours	LTVmux	16:9 SDTV
7 (NI)	That's TV Belfast	Belfast and surrounding areas.	That's Media Ltd.	24 hours	LTVmux	16:9 SDTV
7	That's TV Cambridge	Cambridge and surrounding areas.	That's Media Ltd.	24 hours	LTVmux	16:9 SDTV
7	That's TV Cumbria	Carlisle and surrounding areas.	That's Media Ltd.	24 hours	LTVmux	16:9 SDTV
7	That's TV East	Norwich and surrounding areas.	That's Media Ltd.	24 hours	LTVmux	16:9 SDTV
7	That's TV Hampshire	Basingstoke and surrounding areas.	That's Media Ltd.	24 hours	LTVmux	16:9 SDTV
7	That's TV Humber	Grimsby, Hull and surrounding areas.	That's Media Ltd.	24 hours	LTVmux	16:9 SDTV
7	That's TV Lancashire	Preston and surrounding areas.	That's Media Ltd.	24 hours	LTVmux	16:9 SDTV
7 (GrMcr)	That's TV Manchester	Greater Manchester and surrounding areas.	That's Media Ltd.	24 hours	LTVmux	16:9 SDTV
7	That's TV North Yorkshire	Scarborough and surrounding areas.	That's Media Ltd.	24 hours	LTVmux	16:9 SDTV
7	That's TV Oxfordshire	Oxford and surrounding areas.	That's Media Ltd.	24 hours	LTVmux	16:9 SDTV
7	That's TV Salisbury	Salisbury and surrounding areas.	That's Media Ltd.	24 hours	LTVmux	16:9 SDTV
7	That's TV Scarborough	Scarborough and surrounding areas.	That's Media Ltd.	24 hours	LTVmux	16:9 SDTV
7	That's TV Sheffield	Sheffield and surrounding areas.	That's Media Ltd.	24 hours	LTVmux	16:9 SDTV
7	That's TV Solent	Portsmouth, Southampton and surrounding areas.	That's Media Ltd.	24 hours	LTVmux	16:9 SDTV
7	That's TV Surrey	Guildford and surrounding areas.	That's Media Ltd.	24 hours	LTVmux	16:9 SDTV
7	That's TV Swansea Bay	Swansea and surrounding areas.	That's Media Ltd.	24 hours	LTVmux	16:9 SDTV
7	That's TV Thames Valley	Reading and surrounding areas.	That's Media Ltd.	24 hours	LTVmux	16:9 SDTV
7	That's TV York	York and surrounding areas.	That's Media Ltd.	24 hours	LTVmux	16:9 SDTV
8 (GrLdn)	London TV	Greater London and surrounding areas.	Local Television Limited	24 hours	LTVmux	16:9 SDTV
8 (Wales)	Cardiff TV	Cardiff and surrounding areas.	Local Television Limited	24 hours	LTVmux	16:9 SDTV
8 (Wales)	North Wales TV	Mold, Denbigh, Ruthin, and surrounding areas.	Local Television Limited	24 hours	LTVmux	16:9 SDTV
8 (Scot)	That's TV Scotland	Aberdeen, Ayr, Dundee, Edinburgh, Glasgow, and surrounding areas.	That's Media Ltd	24 hours	LTVmux	16:9 SDTV

=== High-definition ===
These channels can be received on all DVB-T2 (Freeview HD & Freeview Play branded) equipment.

NorDig LCN	DVB name	Notes	Licensee	Parent Company	Broadcast hours	Timeshares	H.222 Transport	Format
101	BBC One HD	Made up of all regional variations since April 2023. Originally launched as a simulcast of BBC One with non-regional programming in 2010. BBC iPlayer via the Red Button on internet-connected devices.	BBC		24 hours		PSB3	1080i/1080p HDTV
102	BBC Two HD	BBC iPlayer via the Red Button on internet-connected devices.	BBC		24 hours		PSB3	1080i/1080p HDTV
103 (except CI)	ITV1 HD / STV HD	ITV network, made up of seven regional variations. Branded ITV1 HD or STV HD, depending on location.	ITV Network Ltd	ITV/STV Group plc	24 hours		PSB3	1080i/1080p HDTV
104 (Eng, Scot & NI)	Channel 4 HD		Channel Four Television Corporation		24 hours		PSB3	1080i/1080p HDTV
104 (Wales)	S4C HD	Programmes in Welsh (Cymraeg).	S4C Authority		19:00 – 06:00 (Monday – Friday); 14:00 – 06:00 (Saturday & Sunday)	Timeshares with CBBC HD.	PSB3	1080i/1080p HDTV
105	5 HD		Channel 5 Broadcasting Limited	Skydance Corporation	24 hours		PSB3	1080i/1080p HDTV
106	BBC Four HD	BBC iPlayer via the Red Button on internet-connected devices.	BBC		19:00 – 04:00	Timeshares with CBeebies HD.	PSB3	1080i/1080p HDTV
107 (Eng, CI & NI)	BBC Three HD	BBC iPlayer via the Red Button on internet-connected devices.	BBC		19:00 – 04:00	Timeshares with CBBC HD.	PSB3	1080i/1080p HDTV
110 (Wales)	Channel 4 HD	Made up of one advertising region (London).	Channel Four Television Corporation		24 hours		PSB3	1080i/1080p HDTV
116 (Scot)	BBC Scotland HD	BBC iPlayer via the Red Button on internet-connected devices.	BBC		19:00 – 00:00	Timeshares with CBBC HD.	PSB3	1080i/1080p HDTV

=== Children's ===
NorDig LCN	DVB name	Notes	Licensee	Parent Company	Broadcast hours	Timeshares	H.222 Transport	Format
201	CBBC	BBC iPlayer via the Red Button on internet-connected devices.	BBC		07:00 – 19:00	Timeshares with BBC Three (SD).	PSB1	16:9 SDTV
202	CBeebies	BBC iPlayer via the Red Button on internet-connected devices.	BBC		06:00 – 19:00	Timeshares with BBC Four (SD).	PSB1	16:9 SDTV
203	CBBC HD	BBC iPlayer via the Red Button on internet-connected devices.	BBC		07:00 – 19:00	Timeshares with BBC Three HD (England and Northern Ireland), BBC Scotland HD (Scotland) and S4C HD (Wales).	PSB3	1080i/1080p HDTV
204	CBeebies HD	BBC iPlayer via the Red Button on internet-connected devices.	BBC		06:00 – 19:00	Timeshares with BBC Four HD.	PSB3	1080i/1080p HDTV
205	Pop	Hybrid streaming channels.	Narrative Entertainment UK Limited		24 hours		COM4	16:9 SDTV
206	Tiny Pop	Hybrid streaming channels.	Narrative Entertainment UK Limited		24 hours		COM4	16:9 SDTV
207	Pop Up	Hybrid streaming channels.	Narrative Entertainment UK Limited		24 hours		COM6	16:9 SDTV
208	Ketchup TV	Portal providing access to Ketchup TV.	Video On Demand 365 Ltd		24 hours		COM4	16:9 SDTV
209	Ketchup Too	Portal providing access to Ketchup Too.	Video On Demand 365 Ltd		24 hours		COM4	16:9 SDTV
210 (limited)	Cartoon Classics	Hybrid streaming channel.			24 hours		LTVmux	16:9 SDTV

=== News ===
NorDig LCN	DVB name	Notes	Licensee	Parent Company	Broadcast hours	Timeshares	H.222 Transport	Format
231	BBC News	BBC iPlayer via the Red Button on internet-connected devices.	BBC		24 hours		PSB1	16:9 SDTV
232	BBC Parliament	BBC iPlayer via the Red Button on internet-connected devices.	BBC		24 hours		PSB1	16:9 SDTV
233	Sky News		Sky UK Limited	Sky Group	24 hours		COM5	16:9 SDTV
236	GB News		All Perspectives Ltd		24 hours		COM6	16:9 SDTV

=== Text services ===
NorDig LCN	DVB name	Licensee/ Parent Company	Broadcast hours	H.222 Transport	Format
250	BBC Red Button	BBC	24 hours	PSB1	Text service

=== Streamed channels ===
Interactive services for compatible receivers streamed from the Internet (Internet connection/compatible HD TV/box required).

NorDig LCN	DVB name	Notes	Licensee/ Parent Company	Broadcast hours	H.222 Transport	Format
251	Al Jazeera English		Al Jazeera Media Network	24 hours	COM4	Text service
252	Al Jazeera Arabic	Portal to Al Jazeera Arabic and Al Jazeera English.	Al Jazeera Media Network	24 hours	COM4	Text service
253	Trailblazer Television	Sister channel to Odyssey TV, MBC, Wild Nature Now and the Music Legends FAST Channel. Not available on all devices. 6 channels available (as of 10 December 2025): D£al Masters - History Hunters - Inside Crime - Mystery TV - Western Bound - World War TV	Go See TV	24 hours	COM4	Text service
254	On Demand 365	15 channels available (as of 10 December 2025): Cool Summer - Crimeflix - D£al Masters - Def Jam - Demand Drama - History Hit - History Hunters - Inside Crime - INTRAVEL - INWILD - INWONDER - Mystery TV - Real Wild - Wonder - World War TV	VOD365	24 hours	COM4	Text service
255	France 24	This channel has access to the France 24 Fast English service, as well as its news channels in the French, Spanish and Arabic languages. France 24 English can also be found streaming via Channelbox on Freeview channel 271.	France Médias Monde	24 hours	COM4	Text service
256	Odyssey TV	Sister channel to Trailblazer Television, MBC, and the Music Legends FAST Channel. Not available on all devices.	Go See TV	24 hours	COM4	Text service
257	Euronews	Access to: Euronews (English) and Africanews. Both channels also available via Channelbox on Freeview 271.	Euronews SA	24 hours	COM4	Text service
259	MBC	"My Binge Channel". Sister channel to Trailblazer Television, Odyssey TV, Wild Nature Now and the Music Legends FAST Channel (the latter accessed here). Not available on all devices. 7 channels available (as of 10 December 2025): Dog the Bounty Hunter - Ice Road Truckers - Lifetime Movies - MovieSphere by Lionsgate - Music Legends - Rookie Blue - Wicked Tuna	Go See TV	24 hours	COM4	Text service
260 (limited)	Asharq News	Asharq News is a 24/7 Arabic multiplatform news service.	Saudi Research and Marketing Group, Vision247 Limited, Mondo Globo Inc.	24 hours	LTVmux	Text service
261 (limited)	Al Arabiya	This channel has access to the Arabic language channels Al Arabiya and Al Hadath.	MBC Group, Vision247 Limited, Mondo Globo Inc.	24 hours	LTVmux	Text service
263	SonLife	Religious channel. Also available on channel 94.	Jimmy Swaggart Ministries	24 hours	COM4	Text service
264	Alaraby Network	Channels available: Alaraby Television, Alaraby2 Television and Syria Television.	Fadaat Media	24 hours	COM4	Text service
265	ROK	Nollywood movie channel.	Rok Studios (Groupe Canal+)	24 hours	COM4	Text service
266	Revelation	Religious channels.	Revelation TV Ltd	24 hours	COM4	Text service
268 (limited)	It Is Written TV	Religious channels.	It Is Written, Inc.	24 hours	LTVmux	Text service
269	New Media TV	Religious channels.	New Media TV UK	24 hours	COM4	Text service
270	Together TV IP	HD service, not available on all devices. SD terrestrial service broadcast on LCN 83 with Together TV +1 now on LCN 90 between 05:00 – 08:00.	The Community Channel	24 hours	COM6	Text service
271	Channelbox	39 channels available (as of 2 November 2026): Action Hollywood Movies - Africanews - Afro Cinema - Al Mashhad TV - Avaz - Billiard TV - Bloomberg Originals - Bloomberg Television - Bollywood Classic - Bollywood HD - BritAsia TV - CNA - ERT Cosmos - Euronews (English) - Euronews (Russian) - FashionTV - 4AceTV Classic Hits - 4AceTV Xtra - France 24 (English) - Fuel TV - Hellenic TV - Nigbati TV - NOVEBOX - OUTflix Proud - Pitaara Comedy - Pitaara Movies - Real Crime - Red Carpet TV - Scream TV (NYX) - Sharjah TV - Silk Way - Supreme Master TV - Times Now - Trace Latina - Trace UK - Trace Urban - TVP World - Vietnam Today - Zoom	Channelbox	24 hours	COM4	Text service
272	NHK World	The English language channel NHK World Japan is streaming now via Freeview, with the Japanese channel NHK World Premium available on LCN 286 on 1 October 2023.	NHK	24 hours	COM4	Text service
273	Newsmax	Newsmax TV is an American television channel owned by Newsmax described as conservative, pro-Trump, right-wing, and far-right.	Newsmax	24 hours	COM4	Text service
274	Amazing Facts TV	Religious channel.	Amazing Facts	24 hours	COM4	Text service
275 (limited)	wedotv	Portal to wedotv Big Stories and wedotv Movies.	wedotv / Video Solutions	24 hours	LTVmux	Text service
276	CNA Originals	Channel NewsAsia is a Singapore-based news channel. Also found streaming via Channelbox on Freeview 271.	Mediacorp	24 hours	COM4	Text service
278	Nosey	Specialises in screenings of U.S. talk and courtroom shows.	Nosey	24 hours	COM4	Text service
279	Purpose Media	PM Live is a portal delivering Christian television programming from various Ministries, including ones previously broadcasting via the Vision TV Freeview channel. Services include Daystar, Faith UK, SuperChannel Orlando, and CTN.	Purpose Media	24 hours	COM4	Text service
283 (limited)	Global Arabic+	A bundle of leading national Arabic channels featuring a rich and diversified programming of general entertainment, news, children's programmes, drama, documentaries and culture. Available in some areas only.	Global	24 hours	LTVmux	Text service
284	GIGS	Live concerts, music documentaries and pop videos from artists and bands signed to Universal Music Group's labels.	Mercury Studios / UMG	24 hours	COM4	Text service
287	Nolly Africa	Nollywood films from Africa.	African Movie Channel	24 hours	LTVmux	Text service
288 (limited)	OUTflix Proud	Also found streaming via Channelbox on Freeview 271.	OUTtv Media Global Inc.	24 hours	LTVmux	Text service
289 (limited)	MBC Group	"Middle East Broadcasting Center", not to be confused with the FAST channel operator found on Freeview 259. Hybrid streaming portal containing access to a bundle of channels operated by the Saudi-based MBC.	Public Investment Fund / Waleed bin Ibrahim Al Ibrahim	24 hours	LTVmux	Text service
290	Music & Memories	Streaming music channel.	Keep It Country TV Ltd	24 hours	COM4	Text service
291	Outdoor Channel	Streaming real life adventure, includes access to World Fishing Network.	Outdoor Sportsman Group (Kroenke Sports & Entertainment); Rock Entertainment Holdings; AMC Networks International	24 hours	COM4	Text service
292 (limited)	Faith TV	Religious channel. Portal to Faith UK and Faith USA.		24 hours	LTVmux	Text service

=== Interactive ===
These are services that are not designed to be channels but do show up on the EPG of the majority of Freeview TVs and boxes.

NorDig LCN	DVB name	Licensee/ Parent Company	Broadcast hours	H.222 Transport	Format
601	BBC RB 1	BBC	24 hours	PSB1	16:9 SDTV

=== Adult ===
These channels are not listed on Freeview's online TV Guide.

NorDig LCN	DVB name	Notes	Licensee/ Parent Company	Broadcast hours	Timeshares	H.222 Transport	Format
670	Adult Section	Consumer protection bookend.	Everyone TV (formerly Digital UK)	24 hours		COM5	Text Service
671	Xpanded TV		Txt Me TV Ltd	00:00 – 07:00		COM6	16:9 SDTV
673	SmileTV3		Cellcast Group	22:00 – 05:00		COM5	16:9 SDTV
674	Babestation		Cellcast Group	00:00 – 05:00	Timeshares with Jewellery Maker and PBS America.	COM6	16:9 SDTV
695	Adult 1	Consumer protection bookend.	Everyone TV (formerly Digital UK)	24 hours		COM5	Text service
696	Adult 2	Consumer protection bookend.	Everyone TV (formerly Digital UK)	24 hours		COM5	Text service
697	Adult 3	Consumer protection bookend.	Everyone TV (formerly Digital UK)	24 hours		COM5	Text service
698	Adult 4	Consumer protection bookend.	Everyone TV (formerly Digital UK)	24 hours		COM6	Text service
699	Adult Section	Consumer protection bookend.	Everyone TV (formerly Digital UK)	24 hours		COM6	Text service

=== Radio stations ===
Unlike the TV channels, the radio stations only broadcast as audio-only services and the station's logo (and sometimes information) is displayed on the screen. On BBC radio stations there are also interactive services via the red button. Those stations also broadcast on analogue radio, Digital Audio Broadcasting and online. BBC local radio stations for England are in the section above this list, as well as those from Scotland, Wales and Northern Ireland.

(* - stations that timeshare with BBC Alba in Scotland)

NorDig LCN	DVB name	Notes	Owner/parent company	Broadcast hours	H.222 Transport
700*	BBC Radio 1	Also available via FM, DAB, BBC Sounds or with the Radioplayer app.	BBC	24 hours (Eng, Wales & NI); 00:00 – 17:00 (Monday – Friday) (Scot); 00:00 – 16:00 (Saturday) (Scot); 01:00 – 16:00 (Sunday) (Scot)	PSB1
701	BBC Radio 1Xtra	Also available via DAB, BBC Sounds or with the Radioplayer app.	BBC	24 hours	PSB1
702*	BBC Radio 2	Also available via FM, DAB, BBC Sounds or with the Radioplayer app.	BBC	24 hours (Eng, Wales & NI); 00:00 – 17:00 (Monday – Friday) (Scot); 00:00 – 16:00 (Saturday) (Scot); 01:00 – 16:00 (Sunday) (Scot)	PSB1
703*	BBC Radio 3	Also available via FM, DAB, BBC Sounds or with the Radioplayer app.	BBC	24 hours (Eng, Wales & NI); 00:00 – 17:00 (Monday – Friday) (Scot); 00:00 – 16:00 (Saturday) (Scot); 01:00 – 16:00 (Sunday) (Scot)	PSB1
704	BBC Radio 4	Also available via FM, DAB, BBC Sounds or with the Radioplayer app.	BBC	24 hours	PSB1
705	BBC Radio 5 Live	Also available via DAB, AM (Medium Wave), BBC Sounds or with the Radioplayer app.	BBC	24 hours	PSB1
706	BBC Radio 5 Sports Extra	Formerly BBC Radio 5 Live Sports Extra. Also available via DAB, BBC Sounds or with the Radioplayer app.	BBC	24 hours	PSB1
707	BBC Radio 6 Music	Also available via DAB, BBC Sounds or with the Radioplayer app.	BBC	24 hours	PSB1
708	BBC Radio 4 Extra	Also available via DAB, BBC Sounds or with the Radioplayer app.	BBC	24 hours	PSB1
709	BBC Asian Network	Also available via DAB, BBC Sounds or with the Radioplayer app.	BBC	24 hours	PSB1
710*	BBC World Service	English language, European version. Also available via DAB, BBC Sounds or with the Radioplayer app.	BBC	24 hours (Eng, Wales & NI); 00:00 – 17:00 (Monday – Friday) (Scot); 00:00 – 16:00 (Saturday) (Scot); 01:00 – 16:00 (Sunday) (Scot)	PSB1
718	Smooth Radio	National version, also available via DAB+, Global Player or with the Radioplayer app.	Global	24 hours	COM6
723	Talksport	Also available via DAB and online.	News UK Broadcasting Ltd	24 hours	COM5
724	Capital	National version, also available via DAB+, Global Player or with the Radioplayer app.	Global	24 hours	COM5
725	Premier Christian Radio		Premier Christian Media Trust	24 hours	COM6
728	Heart	National version, also available via DAB+, Global Player or with the Radioplayer app.	Global	24 hours	COM5
729 (NI)	RTÉ Raidió na Gaeltachta	Programmes in Irish.	RTÉ	24 hours	NImux
730	RNIB Connect		Royal National Institute of Blind People	24 hours	COM5
731	Classic FM	Also available via FM, DAB+, Global Player or with the Radioplayer app.	Global	24 hours	COM5
732	LBC	Also available via DAB, Global Player or with the Radioplayer app.	Global	24 hours	COM5

==== Radio stations: BBC Local and Nations Radio variations ====
In England and the Channel Islands, up to five BBC Local Radio stations are available over DTT. Availability of these stations varies, depending on how their FM and DAB broadcast areas align with locations of DTT transmitters. In Wales, Scotland, and Northern Ireland, national radio services are broadcast in their respective nations. All these stations can also be found on the BBC Sounds or Radioplayer apps.

NorDig LCN	DVB name	Notes	Regional availability	Owner/parent company	Broadcast hours	H.222 Transport
711	BBC CWR	Serves Coventry and Warwickshire.	BBC West Midlands	BBC	24 hours	PSB1
711	BBC Radio Berkshire	Also serves northern Hampshire and parts of Buckinghamshire and Oxfordshire.	BBC South; BBC London	BBC	24 hours	PSB1
711	BBC Radio Bristol	Also serves Bath, South Gloucestershire, North Somerset and North East Somerset.	BBC West; BBC South West	BBC	24 hours	PSB1
711	BBC Radio Jersey	Programmes mainly in English, but with some Jèrriais content.	Channel Islands	BBC	24 hours	PSB1
711	BBC Radio Kent		BBC South East	BBC	24 hours	PSB1
711	BBC Radio Leeds	Serves West Yorkshire.	BBC Yorkshire	BBC	24 hours	PSB1
711	BBC Radio Manchester	Serves Greater Manchester, northeastern Cheshire and northwestern Derbyshire.	BBC North West	BBC	24 hours	PSB1
711	BBC Radio Newcastle	Serves Tyne and Wear, Northumberland and northern County Durham.	BBC North East and Cumbria	BBC	24 hours	PSB1
711	BBC Radio Norfolk	Closedown end November 2026 MW/Digital version.	BBC East	BBC	24 hours	PSB1
711 (Scot)	BBC Radio Scotland	MW/Digital version.	BBC Scotland	BBC	24 hours	PSB1
711 (NI)	BBC Radio Ulster	Programmes mainly in English, but also in Irish and Ulster Scots.	BBC Northern Ireland	BBC	24 hours	PSB1
711 (Wales)	BBC Radio Wales	MW/Digital version.	BBC Cymru Wales	BBC	24 hours	PSB1
712	BBC Hereford & Worcester	Serves Herefordshire. Worcestershire and Kings Norton.	BBC West Midlands	BBC	24 hours	PSB1
712 (Wales)	BBC Radio Cymru	Programmes in Welsh.	BBC Cymru Wales	BBC	24 hours	PSB1
712	BBC Radio Devon		BBC South West	BBC	24 hours	PSB1
712 (NI)	BBC Radio Foyle	County Londonderry opt-out from BBC Radio Ulster.	BBC Northern Ireland	BBC	24 hours	PSB1
712	BBC Radio Lancashire		BBC North West	BBC	24 hours	PSB1
712 (Scot)	BBC Radio nan Gàidheal	Programmes in Scottish Gaelic.	BBC Scotland	BBC	00:00 – 17:00 (Monday – Friday); 00:00 – 16:00 (Saturday); 01:00 – 16:00 (Sunday)	PSB1
712	BBC Radio Nottingham	Serves Nottinghamshire.	BBC East Midlands; BBC Yorkshire and Lincolnshire	BBC	24 hours	PSB1
712	BBC Radio Suffolk		BBC East (E)	BBC	24 hours	PSB1
712	BBC Radio Sussex	Serves East Sussex and West Sussex.	BBC South (S); BBC South East	BBC	24 hours	PSB1
712	BBC Radio York	Serves North Yorkshire.	BBC Yorkshire; BBC North East and Cumbria	BBC	24 hours	PSB1
712	BBC Three Counties Radio	Serves Bedfordshire, Hertfordshire and Buckinghamshire.	BBC East (W); BBC London; BBC South (Oxford)	BBC	24 hours	PSB1
713	BBC Radio Cornwall	Programmes mainly in English, but with some Cornish-language content.	BBC South West	BBC	24 hours	PSB1
713	BBC Radio Cumbria	Closedown end November 2026 MW/Digital version.	BBC North East and Cumbria; BBC North West	BBC	24 hours	PSB1
713 (Wales)	BBC Radio Cymru 2	Programmes in Welsh, opt-out from BBC Radio Cymru.	BBC Cymru Wales	BBC	24 hours	PSB1
713	BBC Radio Guernsey	Programmes mainly in English, but with some Guernésiais content.	Channel Islands	BBC	24 hours	PSB1
713	BBC Radio Humberside	Serves the East Riding of Yorkshire and Northern Lincolnshire.	BBC Yorkshire and Lincolnshire; BBC Yorkshire	BBC	24 hours	PSB1
713	BBC Radio Leicester	Serves Leicestershire and Rutland.	BBC East Midlands	BBC	24 hours	PSB1
713	BBC Radio London		BBC London; BBC East; BBC South East	BBC	24 hours	PSB1
713	BBC Radio Shropshire		BBC West Midlands (NW & SW)	BBC	24 hours	PSB1
713	BBC Radio Wiltshire		BBC South; BBC West	BBC	24 hours	PSB1
714	BBC Radio Cambridgeshire		BBC East	BBC	24 hours	PSB1
714	BBC Radio Lincolnshire		BBC Yorkshire and Lincolnshire; BBC East Midlands	BBC	24 hours	PSB1
714	BBC Radio Merseyside	Also serves West Lancashire and northwestern Cheshire.	BBC North West	BBC	24 hours	PSB1
714	BBC Radio Oxford	Serves Oxfordshire.	BBC South (Oxford)	BBC	24 hours	PSB1
714	BBC Radio Solent	Serves Hampshire and the Isle of Wight.	BBC South (S)	BBC	24 hours	PSB1
714	BBC Radio Somerset	Closedown end November 2026 MW/Digital version.	BBC West; BBC South West	BBC	24 hours	PSB1
714	BBC Radio Surrey	Also serves northeastern Hampshire and northern West Sussex.	BBC South East; BBC London	BBC	24 hours	PSB1
714	BBC Radio Tees	Serves southern County Durham and northern North Yorkshire.	BBC North East and Cumbria	BBC	24 hours	PSB1
714	BBC Radio WM	Serves the West Midlands county, excluding Coventry.	BBC West Midlands	BBC	24 hours	PSB1
715	BBC Radio Solent (Dorset)	Dorset opt-outs.	BBC South (S); BBC South West; BBC West	BBC	24 hours	PSB1
715	BBC Radio Stoke	Serves northern and mid-Staffordshire and southern Cheshire.	BBC West Midlands (NW & E); BBC North West	BBC	24 hours	PSB1
716	BBC Essex		BBC East (E); BBC London; BBC South East	BBC	24 hours	PSB1
716	BBC Radio Northampton	Serves Northamptonshire.	BBC East (W); BBC East Midlands; BBC South (Oxford)	BBC	24 hours	PSB1
716	BBC Radio Sheffield	Serves South Yorkshire and northeastern Derbyshire.	BBC Yorkshire; BBC Yorkshire and Lincolnshire	BBC	24 hours	PSB1
716	BBC Radio Gloucestershire	Closedown end November 2026 MW/Digital version.	BBC West; BBC West Midlands (SW); BBC South (Oxford)	BBC	24 hours	PSB1
717	BBC Radio Derby	Serves Derbyshire and East Staffordshire. Closedown end November 2026 MW/Digital version.	BBC East Midlands; BBC West Midlands (E); BBC Yorkshire (Sheffield)	BBC	24 hours	PSB1

== Channels removed from digital terrestrial television ==
These are channels that have been removed from digital terrestrial television. This does not only include rebranded channels, but channels that have ceased broadcasting.

=== 2000 ===
EPG No.	Channel name	Notes	Replaced by	Date removed
34	Carlton Kids	Timeshared with Carlton World	Discovery Kids	1 February 2000
34	Carlton World	Timeshared with Carlton Kids	Discovery Wings	1 February 2000
35	Carlton Select	Timeshared with Carlton Food Network, which was later renamed to Taste CFN.	Carlton Cinema	1 March 2000
45	Games Channel	Space used by ONdigital to launch ONgames	ONgames 1	8 June 2000
20	First ONdigital / ONdigital Information	Text service	ONview	2000

=== 2001 ===
EPG No.	Channel name	Notes	Replaced by	Date removed
43	Simply Money	Ceased broadcasting. Channel removed from EPG on 23 April 2001. On Sky, the channel was replaced with Simply Shopping on the next 2 days.		15 April 2001
20	ONview	Text service. Relaunched as ITV Digital Information on LCN 88, while ITV Sport Channel launched on this LCN.	ITV Digital Information (channel 88)	11 July 2001
45	ONgames 1	Gaming content moved to ITV Active when ONdigital became ITV Digital.		11 July 2001
46	ONgames 2	Gaming content moved to ITV Active when ONdigital became ITV Digital.		11 July 2001
47	ONoffer	Shopping content moved to ITV Active when ONdigital became ITV Digital.	Wellbeing	11 July 2001
50–55	ONrequest	Pay-per-view service for box office movies, with a dedicated information service on channel 50.	ITV Select	11 July 2001
6	S2	Scottish variant of ITV2.	ITV2	27 July 2001
36	Discovery Kids	Timeshared with Discovery Wings and both were replaced with the Discovery Channel.	Discovery Channel	18 November 2001
36	Discovery Wings	Timeshared with Discovery Wings and both were replaced with the Discovery Channel.	Discovery Channel	18 November 2001
35	Taste CFN	Closed December 2001.		1 December 2001
46	Two Way TV	Removed before ITV Digital ceased broadcasting. Both channels were short-lived.		31 December 2001
47	Wellbeing	Removed before ITV Digital ceased broadcasting. Both channels were short-lived.		31 December 2001

=== 2002 ===
EPG No.	Channel name	Notes	Replaced by	Date removed
6	UTV2	Northern Ireland variant of ITV2.	ITV2	22 January 2002
31	Granada Breeze	Removed before ITV Digital ceased broadcasting. It later closed on 30 April 2002.		31 January 2002
19	Shop!	Shopping channel. This channel ceased its operations, and was replaced by QVC there.	QVC	8 April 2002
16	ITV Text+	Interactive text service. Removed when ITV Digital ceased broadcasting.		1 May 2002
21	Sky Sports 1	Removed when ITV Digital ceased broadcasting. Returned on 1 August 2010 as part of Freeview.		1 May 2002
22	Sky Sports 2	Removed when ITV Digital ceased broadcasting. Returned on 1 August 2010 as part of Freeview.		1 May 2002
23	Sky Sports 3	Removed when ITV Digital ceased broadcasting.		1 May 2002
24	Sky Moviemax	Removed when ITV Digital ceased broadcasting.		1 May 2002
25	Sky Premier	Removed when ITV Digital ceased broadcasting.		1 May 2002
26	Sky One	Removed when ITV Digital ceased broadcasting.		1 May 2002
27	Cartoon Network	Removed when ITV Digital ceased broadcasting. Returned in March 2004 on channel 32 then in 2005 moved to channel 72 as part of the Top Up TV Service.		1 May 2002
28	Carlton Cinema	Removed when ITV Digital ceased broadcasting. It then closed down almost 11 months later.		1 May 2002
29	British Eurosport	Removed when ITV Digital ceased broadcasting. Returned in June 2005 on channel 49 as a replacement for E4 on the Top Up TV Service which became free to air in May 2005.		1 May 2002
30	Plus	Removed when ITV Digital ceased broadcasting. More than 2 years later Plus was replaced by ITV3.		1 May 2002
31	Men & Motors	Removed when ITV Digital ceased broadcasting. Returned in May 2005 on channel 38 as part of the Freeview service.		1 May 2002
32	UK Gold	Removed when ITV Digital ceased broadcasting. Returned in March 2004 on channel 17 as part of the Top Up TV Service.		1 May 2002
33	MTV	Removed when ITV Digital ceased broadcasting.		1 May 2002
36	Discovery Channel	Removed when ITV Digital ceased broadcasting. Returned in March 2004 on channel 27 as part of the Top Up TV Service.		1 May 2002
37	Play UK	Removed when ITV Digital ceased broadcasting. This had a significant impact on its viewership and the channel closed on 30 September 2002. Exactly one month later, UK History (now known as Yesterday) started broadcasting on Freeview using the space vacated by the closure of Play UK.		1 May 2002
38	UK Style	Removed when ITV Digital ceased broadcasting. Returned in March 2004 on channel 26 as part of the Top Up TV Service.		1 May 2002
39	Nickelodeon	Removed when ITV Digital ceased broadcasting. Was timeshared with the Paramount Comedy Channel. Returned on 28 November 2013 on channel 238 as part of VuTV.		1 May 2002
39	Paramount Comedy Channel	Removed when ITV Digital ceased broadcasting. Was timeshared with Nickelodeon. Returned on 28 November 2013 as Comedy Central on channel 238 as part of VuTV.		1 May 2002
43	UK Horizons	Removed when ITV Digital ceased broadcasting; it closed 2 years later.		1 May 2002
50–55	ITV Select	Removed when ITV Digital ceased broadcasting.		1 May 2002
88	ITV Digital Information	Removed when ITV Digital ceased broadcasting.		1 May 2002
90	Adult Channel	Removed when ITV Digital ceased broadcasting.		1 May 2002
20	ITV Sport Channel	Removed after ITV Digital ceased broadcasting.		12 May 2002
91	Television X	Removed after ITV Digital ceased broadcasting. Returned in March 2004 on channel 60 as a pay per view channel for Freeview and Top Up TV.		18 May 2002
41	FilmFour	Removed after ITV Digital ceased broadcasting, but returned in July 2006 as Film4 on channel 31 and part of the Freeview service.		24 May 2002
42	E4	Removed after ITV Digital ceased broadcasting. Returned in March 2004 on channel 14 as part of the Top Up TV service then on 27 May 2005 became part of the Freeview service.		24 May 2002

=== 2004 ===
EPG No.	Channel name	Notes	Replaced by	Date removed
17	TV Travel Shop	Shopping channel. Replaced by UKTV Gold as one of the first Top Up TV-encrypted channels before the launch of Top Up TV. Channel continued to broadcast on Satellite and Cable until it rebranded as iBuy the following year.	Top Up TV encrypted channels	1 February 2004
53	Free2Play	Interactive gaming service. This service was short lived, and was replaced by YooPlay Games there.	YooPlay Games	27 May 2004

=== 2005 ===
EPG No.	Channel name	Notes	Replaced by	Date removed
88	Jazz FM	At one time, Jazz FM was also available via YooPlay Games on channel 53 as a background radio station. On 18 October 2005 as part of the EPG reshuffle, 102.2 Smooth FM moved to channel 718.	102.2 Smooth FM	7 June 2005
36	Xtraview	Top Up TV pay-per-view service. Space revoked by Channel 4 to launch More4. The channel still remained on the EPG following the October 2005 reshuffle and was later removed from there.	More4	31 August 2005
705	LCN 705	Interactive stream. Ceased broadcasting when the Freeview EPG changes took place in October, with the space being given to BBC Radio 5 Live due to all radio stations moving from 70's to 700's on the EPG.	BBC Radio 5 Live	18 October 2005
11	Sky Travel	Only replaced on Freeview. Channel later rebranded to Sky Real Lives on all other platforms.	Sky3	31 October 2005
81	ITV News Channel	Ceased broadcasting. The EPG number was later removed to release a slot for the CITV channel, which launched in March 2006.	CITV (channel 75)	23 December 2005

=== 2006 ===
EPG No.	Channel name	Notes	Replaced by	Date removed
38	Men & Motors		ITV Play	12 April 2006
31	More4 +1	Channel originally replaced by Big Brother Interactive Channel. Replaced by Film4 on 23 July 2006. Returned in January 2017 on channel 86 and on the HD Multiplex COM8.	Film4	18 May 2006
106	YooPlay Games	Interactive gaming service which replaced Free2Play. At the same time the service closed, the Sky version of this channel was replaced by YooPlay TV.	YooPlay TV (on Sky)	18 July 2006
74	Toonami	Space revoked by Five to launch Five Life.	Five Life	3 September 2006
84	Bloomberg	Space revoked by Five to launch Five Life.	Five Life	5 September 2006
98	Red Hot	Space revoked by Five to launch Five US.	Five US	5 September 2006
73	Boomerang	Space used by Top Up TV to launch a video loop about their anytime service.	Top Up TV Promo	12 September 2006
29	UKTV Food	Space revoked by Five to launch Five Life.	Five Life	26 September 2006
41	Top Up TV Promo	Space revoked by Five to launch Five US. Returned in February 2007 on channel 43 and in a different space on the multiplex.	Five US	6 October 2006
32	Quiz Call	Closed down after ownership sold to iTouch. Service moved to Five more than a year later.	Film4 +1	15 November 2006

=== 2007 ===
EPG No.	Channel name	Notes	Replaced by	Date removed
42	Discovery Real Time	Removed in favour of Top Up TV Anytime 1.	Top Up TV Anytime 1	4 February 2007
27	Discovery Channel	Space used by Top Up TV to launch a video loop about their anytime service.	Top Up TV Promo	6 February 2007
72	Cartoon Network	Removed in favour of Top Up TV Anytime 3. CITV moved from LCN 75 to this LCN shortly afterwards.	Top Up TV Anytime 3	9 February 2007
724	3C	Replaced by Clyde 1.	Clyde 1	24 March 2007
25	TCM	Removed in favour of Thomas Cook TV.	Thomas Cook TV	17 April 2007
32	Film4 +1	Space used to launch Channel 4 +1 on channel 13, moving More4 to channel 14, E4 to channel 29 and Film4 to channel 32. Returned on 27 August 2013 on channel 45.	Channel 4 +1	20 August 2007
41	Thomas Cook TV		Nuts TV/The Jewellery Channel	1 September 2007
15	ABC1	Ceased broadcasting when it was supposed to close down on 1 October 2007.		26 September 2007
20	Ftn	Relaunched as Virgin1.	Virgin1	1 October 2007
729	Radio Music Shop	This was the world's first retail radio station. Ceased broadcasting.		5 October 2007

=== 2008 ===
EPG No.	Channel name	Notes	Replaced by	Date removed
727	Virgin Radio	Original version of Virgin Radio UK. The current version of the station launched in 2016 - eight years after Absolute Radio took over the original version itself.	Absolute Radio	28 September 2008
44	The Jewellery Channel	Broadcast licence not renewed (for unknown reasons). Returned to channel 60 on 21 September 2011.	Gems TV	6 October 2008
724	Clyde 1	In 2010, this space became the placeholder for 95.8 Capital FM.	95.8 Capital FM	30 October 2008
721	Mojo Radio	Ceased broadcasting on Freeview.	BBC Local Radio	30 November 2008

=== 2009 ===
EPG No.	Channel name	Notes	Replaced by	Date removed
24	Price-Drop TV	Returned to channel 43 on 27 August 2009.	Quest	5 January 2009
46	SmileTV2	England, Northern Ireland, Scotland only. Returned on 12 May 2009 in all areas. The channel was removed to allow Virgin1 to move to a different space in the EPG.	Virgin1	17 March 2009
44	GEMSTV1	CNN used space to increase its broadcast hours.	CNN	31 March 2009
43	Gems TV	Film4 used space to increase its broadcast hours. Returned in April 2010 as a timeshare with Quest.	Film4	1 May 2009
39	Super Casino	Channel removed from EPG on 23 August 2010.		20 October 2009
302	302	BBC Red Button stream. Space being used for HD channels in post switchover areas.		2 November 2009
303	303	BBC Red Button stream. Space being used for HD channels in post switchover areas.		2 November 2009
100	Teletext	Channel removed from EPG on 21 June 2010.	Teletext Holidays	15 December 2009

=== 2010 ===
EPG No.	Channel name	Notes	Replaced by	Date removed
35	Virgin1 +1		Extended broadcast hours for Yesterday.	1 June 2010
41	Ideal Extra		Extended broadcast hours for TV News 2.	1 June 2010
88	Teachers TV	Channel removed from EPG on 7 October 2010.		21 July 2010
83	Sky Sports News	Channel removed from EPG on 22 September 2010.	Sky3 +1	23 August 2010
99	Babestation 2		ADULT Section/Extended broadcast hours for Yesterday.	1 September 2010
20	Virgin1	Relaunched as Channel One.	Channel One	3 September 2010
201	JML Direct	Manchester only.		13 October 2010
84	CNN International	Channel removed from EPG on 27 July 2011. Returned on 28 November 2013 as part of VUTV on Freeview HD channel 238.		14 November 2010
86	S4C2	Wales only.		30 November 2010

=== 2011 ===
EPG No.	Channel name	Notes	Replaced by	Date removed
20	Channel One	Removed because it had similar programming to sister channel Sky3.	Challenge	1 February 2011
44	Pick TV +1	Removed so that all of the channels owned by BSkyB could be on multiplex C and Challenge can broadcast 24 hours a day in Wales. Channel removed from EPG on 17 October 2011. Returned in March 2018 as Pick +1 on channel 97 and on the HD multiplex COM7.	Challenge with increased broadcast hours in Wales.	20 September 2011
47	Daystar	Channel removed from EPG on 24 November 2011. Returned on 5 January 2015.		11 October 2011
191	Red Hot TV	Removed to allow Television X to continue broadcasting. Channel removed from EPG on 9 January 2012.		1 December 2011

=== 2012 ===
EPG No.	Channel name	Notes	Replaced by	Date removed
192	Filth			9 January 2012
201	Movies4Men	Manchester only. Later returned nationwide on 1 April 2014.		January 2012
202	Movies4Men +1	Manchester only. Later returned nationwide on 1 April 2014.		January 2012
203	Movies4Men 2	Manchester only.		January 2012
204	Movies4Men 2 +1	Manchester only.		January 2012
205	Men&Movies	Manchester only.		January 2012
178	Playboy	Channel removed from EPG on 23 January 2013.	Extended broadcast hours for The Jewellery Channel.	1 December 2012

=== 2013 ===
EPG No.	Channel name	Notes	Replaced by	Date removed
57	High Street TV	Manchester only.		23 April 2013
55	Argos TV	Channel removed from Freesat on 9 May & Sky on 13 May. A full-time simulcast was available on channel 54 in the Manchester region.		12 May 2013
716	Q	Removed to release a slot for Kisstory. Also ceased online and on digital radio on the same day. Releasing the slot for Kisstory also caused Heat to move from LCN 714 to this LCN.	Kisstory	12 May 2013
41	Sky Sports 1	Continues on Sky, Virgin Media and TalkTalk TV.	BT Sport 1	1 July 2013
42	Sky Sports 2	Continues on Sky, Virgin Media and TalkTalk TV.	BT Sport 2	1 July 2013
34	ESPN	Continues on Sky, Virgin Media and BT TV.	BT Sport Preview	1 August 2013
712	Smash Hits Radio	Removed to release a slot for Kiss Fresh. Also ceased online and on digital radio on the same day.	Kiss Fresh	5 August 2013
235	God TV	Returned in December 2022 on channel 282.	The Angel Foundation	10 September 2013
26	Gold	Removed with closure of Top Up TV. Continues on BT TV, TalkTalk TV, Sky and Virgin Media.		31 October 2013
54	Home	Removed with closure of Top Up TV. Returned in March 2016 on channel 25 as part of Freeview.		31 October 2013
57	BT Sport Previews	Removed with closure of Top Up TV. Channel removed from EPG on 4 November 2013.	Extended broadcasting hours for Marketplace.	1 November 2013
53	SAB TV	Manchester only.		28 November 2013

=== 2014 ===
EPG No.	Channel name	Notes	Replaced by	Date removed
180	xxXpanded TV	Channel later rebranded as Xpanded TV on all platforms.	Extended broadcasting hours for The Jewellery Channel.	30 January 2014
23	bid	Went into administration.		17 April 2014
37	Price Drop	Went into administration.		17 April 2014
53	Lamhe	Manchester only.		23 October 2014

=== 2015 ===
EPG No.	Channel name	Notes	Replaced by	Date removed
59	BT Sport 2	Continues on BT TV, Sky and Virgin Media.		1 January 2015
58	BT Sport 1	Continues on BT TV, Sky and Virgin Media.		2 June 2015
201	Holidays TV	Text service. Channel removed from EPG on 25 November 2015.		17 November 2015
202	Rabbit	Text service. Channel removed from EPG on 25 November 2015.		17 November 2015
203	Gay Rabbit	Text service. Channel removed from EPG on 25 November 2015.		17 November 2015
204	1-2-1 Dating	Text service. Channel removed from EPG on 25 November 2015.		17 November 2015

=== 2016 ===
EPG No.	Channel name	Notes	Replaced by	Date removed
7	BBC Three	Since BBC Three was moved to stream on the iPlayer on 16 February, channel 7 has been used for various local television services. BBC Three returned to Freeview on 1 February 2022 on channel 23.	Extended broadcast hours for CBBC.	16 February 2016
105	BBC Three HD	BBC Three HD returned to Freeview on 1 February 2022 on channel 109.	Extended broadcast hours for CBBC.	16 February 2016
240	Motors TV	Streamed version.		23 March 2016

=== 2017 ===
EPG No.	Channel name	Notes	Replaced by	Date removed
91	Front Runner TV			5 July 2017
88	Rishtey Cineplex	Channel later became a pay TV channel on satellite.		18 July 2017
726	U105	Northern Ireland only. Removed due to Children stations moving from 120's to 200's, News stations moving from 130's to 230's, Adult stations moving from 170's to 670's, Text data stations moving from 200's to 250's and Streaming stations moving from 220's to 260's		2 August 2017

=== 2018 ===
EPG No.	Channel name	Notes	Replaced by	Date removed
82	Vintage TV	Channel removed from the EPG in early 2019.		3 August 2018

=== 2019 ===
EPG No.	Channel name	Notes	Replaced by	Date removed
2	BBC Two Scotland	Scotland only. Replaced with BBC Scotland, which launched on 24 February 2019. BBC Four Scotland moved from LCN 9 to LCN 82.	BBC Scotland (channel 09)	17 February 2019
209	POP +1	Returned on 19 February 2025 on channel 212 as a hybrid streaming channel.		27 June 2019
84	Now 90s	The channel was replaced by Now 70s before becoming a Channelbox channel alongside Clubland. On 13 May 2020, it came back onto Freeview (on the Manchester multiplex) replacing Now 70s.		27 August 2019
270	Loveworld TV			29 August 2019
40	Movies4Men	Replaced with Sony Movies Action.	Sony Movies Action	10 September 2019
48	True Entertainment	Replaced with revival of Sony Channel.	Sony Channel	10 September 2019
50	True Movies	Replaced with Sony Movies Christmas.	Sony Movies Christmas	10 September 2019
60	Sony Crime Channel	This channel on the Manchester multiplex was then changed to channel 61 as Sony Movies +1 took the old EPG number.	Sony Channel +1	10 September 2019
62	True Movies +1	Freeview change occurred in Manchester only.	Sony Movies Christmas +1	10 September 2019
72	Your TV	Content transferred to Fox		27 September 2019
68	True Crime	Manchester only.		1 October 2019
69	True Crime +1	Manchester only.		1 October 2019

=== 2020 ===
EPG No.	Channel name	Notes	Replaced by	Date removed
31	5Spike	Merged with Paramount Network, in a similar move to the US version in 2018.	Paramount Network	7 January 2020
94	Paramount Network +1	Failed to launch.		15 April 2020
672	ADULT smileTV2			13 May 2020
716	heat	Became an online only radio station. It is now available on DAB+ as well as Heat Player, Planet Radio and with the Radioplayer app	Greatest Hits Radio	2 June 2020
92	Pick +1	Continued on Sky until 30 March 2022.		18 June 2020
55	5Star +1	Removed because of the closure of the COM8 multiplex. Continues on Sky, Freesat and Virgin Media.		22 June 2020
56	5USA +1	Removed because of the closure of the COM8 multiplex. Continues on Sky, Freesat and Virgin Media.		22 June 2020
67	CBS Reality +1	Removed because of the closure of the COM8 multiplex. Continues on Sky, Freesat and Virgin Media.		22 June 2020
69	CBS Justice +1	Removed because of the closure of the COM8 multiplex.		22 June 2020
109	Channel 4 +1 HD	Removed because of the closure of the COM8 multiplex.		22 June 2020
110	4seven HD	Removed because of the closure of the COM8 Multiplex. Continues exclusively on Virgin Media and Sky Glass.		22 June 2020
115	TJC HD	Removed because of the closure of the COM8 multiplex.		22 June 2020
34	Merit	Removed to release a slot for Sky Arts on channel 11.	Sky Arts (channel 11)	17 September 2020

=== 2021 ===
EPG No.	Channel name	Notes	Replaced by	Date removed
73	CCXTV	Replaced with Drama +1. This channel was short lived.	Drama +1	1 February 2021
83	Together TV +1	Returned on 26 October 2022 on channel 92.		15 February 2021
89	Court TV	This American channel had a short-term carriage deal via Freeview COM7 in order to show the Derek Chauvin trial. Court TV continues to be found broadcasting online and via satellite.		1 June 2021
251	365 Travel	This was a TV text service on Freeview.		1 June 2021
679	ADULT Studio 66	This was a part time channel operating between 00:00 – 06:00 each night. Since closing on Freeview the channel has continued on social media.		30 November 2021
680	ADULT Xpanded 2	This was the streamed version of Xpanded TV, with the channel being a slimcast after midnight. Since closing this slot on Freeview, Xpanded TV has continued as a part-time channel on channel 678 operating between 00:00 – 07:00, with the streaming option available on other devices.		15 December 2021
99 (GrMcr)	Manchester TV	This was Manchester's second local channel after That's Manchester but was licensed like a standard channel alongside services like Now 90s and Clubland. It was run by Local Television Limited with most slots being given over to simulcasts of Local TV's channel in Liverpool or CBS Reality, channels which still continue to hold slots on Freeview.		15 December 2021

=== 2022 ===
EPG No.	Channel name	Notes	Replaced by	Date removed
32	Paramount Network	Closed ahead of the launch of the streaming service Paramount+, which is being launched in Summer 2022 as a partnership with Sky. Some of the channel's former content will be moving there, though most programmes were carried over to 5Action.	5Action	19 January 2022
85	The Craft Store	As Hochanda bought the Create & Craft brand from Ideal Shopping, they moved that channel into Freeview 85 on 16 February 2022 just as Craft Extra came on LCN 95, with programming from The Craft Store continuing for another 9 days under the Create & Craft name. After being taken off Freeview, The Craft Store name is being used online by Hochanda Global Ltd.	Create & Craft	19 January 2022
95	Craft Extra	As Hochanda bought the Create & Craft brand from Ideal Shopping, they moved that channel into Freeview 85 from 16 February 2022 just as This channel on this LCN, with Create & Craft programming continuing on Freeview 85 under the name Craft Extra for 9 extra days.	Create & Craft (Freeview 85)	25 February 2022
234	RT	Removed due to the EU banning the channel (as an effect of 2022 Russian invasion of Ukraine) - although the UK is no longer part of the EU since 2020, its feed was provided by EU-based companies. Channel numbers removed on 18 March 2022 as a result of Ofcom revoking their broadcast licence.		2 March 2022
113	RT HD	Removed due to the EU banning the channel (as an effect of 2022 Russian invasion of Ukraine) - although the UK is no longer part of the EU since 2020, its feed was provided by EU-based companies. Channel numbers removed on 18 March 2022 as a result of Ofcom revoking their broadcast licence.		2 March 2022
94	Ideal Extra	Part of the channel portfolio that Hochanda Global Ltd bought from Ideal Shopping, with other Hochanda Global services continuing as normal online and on Freeview, and with original parent channel Ideal World still found on channel 51.		28 March 2022
208	Pop Max	Pop Max was a children's channel from Narrative Entertainment which was only being broadcast to viewers in Greater Manchester when it was replaced on Freeview 208 with Pop Player, a streaming service which gives access to Pop Max as well as Pop and Tiny Pop for any viewer in the UK with an HbbTV-enabled set. Relaunched on 19 July 2023 as Pop Player moves from this LCN to LCN 212.	Pop Player	25 May 2022
31	4Music	Removed because of E4 Extra, a digital TV channel which has carried over the entertainment programming schedule from 4Music (usually old American sitcoms and former C4/E4 shows). 4Music continues on Freesat, Sky and Virgin Media in place of Box Hits, with some of the channel's music programming also found each morning on E4 Extra.	E4 Extra	29 June 2022
96	Forces TV	This channel was closed on 30 June 2022 after COM7 was scrapped with the channel's original programming moving to the Forces News' YouTube channel and via Forces.net.		30 June 2022
65	FreeSports	This channel was closed on 30 June 2022 after COM7 was scrapped with the channel continuing on satellite and via Samsung's TV Plus app. Replaced with That's TV (UK), which moved to LCN 65 from LCN 91.	That's TV (UK)	30 June 2022
69	CBS Justice			30 June 2022
87	PBS America +1	Removed because of the closure of the COM7 multiplex.		30 June 2022
111	QVC HD	Removed because of the closure of the COM7 multiplex. Continues on Freesat, Sky and Virgin Media.		30 June 2022
112	QVC Beauty HD	Removed because of the closure of the COM7 multiplex.		30 June 2022
114	Quest HD	Removed because of the closure of the COM7 multiplex. Continues on Freesat, Sky and Virgin Media.		30 June 2022
86	More4 +1	Removed because of the closure of the COM7 multiplex. Continues on Freesat, Sky and Virgin Media.		30 June 2022
107	BBC News HD	Removed because of the closure of the COM7 multiplex. Continues on Freesat, Sky and Virgin Media, with an HD stream available via the BBC iPlayer.		30 June 2022
97 (GrMcr)	OD365.TV	A locally licensed version of On Demand 365 for viewers in Greater Manchester, with channels such as Gas Station, Sports Channel Network & Planet History available. After 20 July 2022, the service could be still accessed nationwide as a streaming channel on Freeview channel 265.	On Demand 365 (Freeview 265)	20 July 2022
91 (GrMcr)	Country Music Entertainment (CME)	This country music video channel was broadcast on Freeview to viewers in Greater Manchester, with its television and radio channel also available online. In August 2022, the Freeview slot was sold to That's TV so they could run a 24-hour version on Classic Hits in Manchester after it was decided that their national music video channel's hours would be reduced to three hours a night. This gives That's TV four Freeview slots in the Greater Manchester area as Classic Hits MCR joins their two national channels and their local TV slot. Meanwhile, CME could be still accessed nationwide as a streaming channel via On Demand 365.	Classic Hits MCR (Freeview 91) / On Demand 365 (Freeview 265)	24 August 2022
76 (GrMcr)	Now 70s	Now 70s was only being shown to viewers in the Greater Manchester area on Freeview. It reappeared on Freeview as a FAST service on Channelbox LCN 271 on 2 March 2023.		21 September 2022
77 (GrMcr)	Now 80s	Now 80s was only being shown to viewers in the Greater Manchester area on Freeview. In September 2022, the TV channel started to be streamed through Samsung TV Plus as a FAST service on channel number 4717 and continues to be broadcast on Sky. In March 2023 it became a FAST service on Freeview as well via Channelbox LCN 271.		26 October 2022
87 (GrMcr)	Now 90s	Now 90s was only being shown to viewers in the Greater Manchester area on Freeview. It reappeared on Freeview as a national FAST service on Channelbox LCN 271 on 2 March 2023 and was renamed Now Rock a few weeks later. It continues to be broadcast on Sky.		26 October 2022
80 (GrMcr)	Clubland TV	Clubland TV was only being shown to viewers in the Greater Manchester area on Freeview. It continues to be broadcast on Sky.		26 October 2022
3	ITV	Replaced by ITV1.	ITV1	15 November 2022
71	Quest Red +1	1 hour timeshift of Quest Red. Quest has now filled its space on the COM6 multiplex.		23 November 2022
1	BBC One East (West)	Cambridge region only. Merged with BBC One East (East).	BBC One East (East)	17 December 2022
1	BBC One Oxfordshire	Oxfordshire region only. Merged with BBC One South.	BBC One South	17 December 2022

=== 2023 ===
EPG No.	Channel name	Notes	Replaced by	Date removed
57	Smithsonian Channel	Dave ja vu has moved from LCN 74 to this LCN and it's now filled its space on the EPG, but it is on the COM4 multiplex.	U&DaveJaVu	6 January 2023
80	That's 90s	This national channel failed to launch, with the That's 90s placeholder replaced by a 24-hour That's 70s MCR channel in the Greater Manchester area instead. In addition, the That's 90s brand is also used as a programming block on the national That's TV channel. In September 2023, a Greater Manchester version of That's 90s launched on LCN 86. The national version of this channel finally launched in October 2023 on LCN 75.	That's 70s MCR	23 March 2023
101	BBC One HD	Generic version with no regional programming broadcasts, and replaced with individual regional variants. Removed from Virgin Media on 26 January 2022 and satellite over the course of January and February 2023. London, Yorkshire, Yorkshire & Lincolnshire, East Midlands, West Midlands and Channel Islands regions only.		23 March 2023
37	QVC Beauty	Timeshared with QVC Style. QVC2 launched on 21 June 2023 which caused to move Channel 5 +1 to channel 38, 5SELECT to channel 46, Together TV +1 to channel 90, BBC Three HD to channel 107, Vision TV to channel 261, Arise News to channel 262, FailArmy to channel 264, Pet Collective to channel 266, Al Jazeera English to channel 267, Al Jazeera Arabic to channel 268, WION to channel 269, Real Crime to channel 270 and Xpanded TV to channel 675. Channel also went into administration. Continues on Freesat, Sky and Virgin Media.	QVC2	21 June 2023
38	QVC Style	Timeshared with QVC Beauty. Channel also went into administration. Continues on Freesat, Sky and Virgin Media.	Extended broadcast hours for QVC2.	21 June 2023
51	Ideal World	Went into administration on 3 July 2023, but then TJC acquired the rights to utilise the Ideal World brand and relaunched the channel on 29 September 2023.		3 July 2023
90	Together TV +1	Moved to streaming channel 285. Returned on 24 January 2024 on channel 92 and channel 285 Together TV +1 renamed as Together TV IP on 25 January 2024.		23 August 2023
203	CITV	All programming and content moved to ITVX. It was also announced that children's programming will be broadcast on ITV2 as part of its morning schedule, with the channel remaining on the EPG as a data service until 22 November 2023.	ITVX Kids	1 September 2023
36	Pick	All programming and content moved to Sky Mix on LCN 11, causing Sky Arts to move to this slot here.	Sky Mix (channel 11)	18 October 2023
261	Vision TV	This was a streaming portal giving access to channels such as ARISEPlay, France24, Newsmax TV, Channel 7, Yanga! and Edgy TV via compatible devices connected to the internet. Vision TV was taken off Freeview at the same time as channel 291 was given over to a new streaming portal called TV Extra, with Vision TV still continuing as an app and online.	visiontv.co.uk	22 November 2023
262	Arise News	After being delisted from Sky, this was removed from Freeview alongside the Vision TV Network portal, with Arise News, and sister channel ARISEPlay, still broadcasting via the main visiontv.co.uk site.	visiontv.co.uk	22 November 2023

=== 2024 ===
EPG No.	Channel name	Notes	Replaced by	Date removed
269	WION	World Is One News is an Indian channel owned by Essel Group, who are also responsible for the Zee World channels still streaming via Freeview channel 278.	wionews.com	21 February 2024
207	Tiny Pop	Became a hybrid streaming channel. Moved to 208 due to channel number changes on 12 June 2024. Relaunched on Local 21 August 2024.	popplayer.co.uk/tiny-pop/	20 March 2024
711	Hits Radio	A Bauer Media station. National version, now available via FM in London, DAB Nationwide, Planet Radio or with the Radioplayer app. Regional versions are now available in some places on FM & DAB.	planetradio.co.uk/hits-radio/	2 April 2024
713	Kiss	A Bauer Media station, delisted with sister stations Kisstory and KissXtra. Now available via FM in London, DAB Nationwide, Planet Radio or with the Radioplayer app.	planetradio.co.uk/kiss/	2 April 2024
715	Magic	A Bauer Media station. Now available via FM in London, DAB Nationwide, Planet Radio or with the Radioplayer app.	planetradio.co.uk/magic/	2 April 2024
716	Greatest Hits Radio	A Bauer Media station. National version, now available via FM in London, DAB Nationwide, Planet Radio or with the Radioplayer app. Regional versions are still available in some places on FM & DAB, as well as online.	planetradio.co.uk/greatest-hits/	2 April 2024
717	Kerrang! Radio	A Bauer Media station. Now available via FM in London, DAB Nationwide, Planet Radio or with the Radioplayer app.	planetradio.co.uk/kerrang/	2 April 2024
278	Zee World	This was a streaming portal to Zee World, Zest, Zing and Zee Punjabi. All these services are Indian channels owned by Essel Group, via Zee Entertainment Enterprises with channels continuing to be broadcast elsewhere in the world and sister channel available on Sky.		24 April 2024
237	TalkTV	This News UK channel closed as a linear television news service and moved to become a streaming service on Freeview channel 294 and via Samsung TV Plus.	Talk (Channel 294)	1 May 2024
727	Absolute Radio	A Bauer Media station. Removed from Freeview on 10 May. Channel removed from EPG on 22 May. Now available via FM in London, DAB Nationwide, Planet Radio or via the Radioplayer app.	planetradio.co.uk/absolute-radio/	10 May 2024
76	That's 90s	That's Memories and That's Dance were added on 12 June 2024, with the latter service taking over That's 90s national slot. That's 90s MCR continues for viewers in Greater Manchester, but has moved to Freeview 78 from channel 86.	That's Dance/That's 90s MCR	12 June 2024
78	TCC	TCC was The Community Channel's licence bought by A&E Networks UK so that their channel Blaze would be listed higher up on the EPG and The Community Channel would end up lower down (under their new name Together TV). TCC and sister channel Blaze +1 were a couple of part-time services slots hoarded by A&E Networks, which broadcast shows from Blaze for a couple of hours each night after the main channel shut down. In May 2024, That's Media acquired the TCC Broadcasting broadcast licence and its EPG slot from A+E Networks UK, so that it could launch That's Memories.	Blaze/That's Memories/Together TV	12 June 2024
79	EarthxTV	This channel stopped broadcasting on Freeview before the website RXTV Info included it in its channel update of 12 June 2024, however the channel might still be listed on the Freeview EPG if the programme guide is not reset. EarthxTV is a global channel and can be found via the Dailymotion platform and from various cable operators around the world.	Seen On TV	12 June 2024
80	That's 80s MCR	That's Dance MCR replaced from That's 80s MCR, while the national That's Dance channel replaced from That's 90s, with That's 90s MCR continuing in Greater Manchester on Freeview 78 and That's 80s still listed by Sky.	That's Dance MCR	12 June 2024
79 or 94	Seen On TV	This channel launched on 12 June 2024, with its broadcasts either being shown on EarthxTV's former slot, channel 79 or, with automatic retuning, channel 94. The channel featured presenter Simon Iles from Ideal World and Create & Craft's Shop Extra channels, with the channel going back to being a shopping service on TikTok after its transmissions ended on Freeview. Channel removed from EPG on 21 August 2024 due to all That's TV channels renaming and moving streaming channels to range of 251–283.	Seen On TikTok (social media account)	25 June 2024
75	That's 60s	This channel has become a programming block on various That's TV channels, with the That's 60s and That's 60s MCR channels becoming That's Memories and That's Memories MCR (currently found in the Greater Manchester area on Freeview 95).	That's TV/That's TV 2/That's Memories	1 July 2024
61	Great! Real	A large percentage of the channel's programmes have been moved over, by owners Narrative Entertainment, to their Great! Action on Freeview channel 42.	Great! Action	20 August 2024
275	NYX	A horror movies and TV shows channel now streaming via Channelbox on Freeview channel 271.	NYX via Channelbox	21 August 2024
276	Mech+	Robotics, science and engineering channel, run by programme makers Mentorn, who continue to show episodes of Robot Wars via their app, website or YouTube.	Mech-plus.com	18 September 2024
235	Al Jazeera	This was the version of the channel in the News section, broadcasting as a regular free-to-air DTT channel. Al Jazeera's English language news service continues as a streaming channel, on smart TVs with Freeview Play, alongside the Arabic language version of Al Jazeera.	Al Jazeera English (Streaming channel)	30 September 2024
269	Amazing Discoveries	This Canadian religious organisation's programmes can be found on their website or on YouTube.	New Media TV (Streaming channel)	16 October 2024
74	U&Yesterday +1	Replaced by U&Eden on LCN 57, causing U&DaveJaVu to move to this slot here.	U&Eden (Channel 57)	16 October 2024
85	Create & Craft	This channel moved from LCN 95 to this LCN on 16 February 2022 as Craft Extra launched to Freeview channel 95. Channel also went into administration. Channel removed from EPG on 10 December 2024.		25 October 2024
206	Pop Max	A children's channel which was only available in local channel areas on Freeview, with programmes moved to POP's streaming service. Channel removed from EPG on 10 December 2024 moving Tiny Pop from LCN 208 to this LCN. Returned on 20 August 2025 on channel 212 until 10 December 2025.	POP Player (Channel 208)	1 December 2024
257	FilmStream	From Canal+'s SPI International streaming division.	Channel continued on Plex but was later shut down along with others.	10 December 2024

=== 2025 ===
EPG No.	Channel name	Notes	Replaced by	Date removed
8	London Live	Local TV acquired to rename as London TV.	London TV	19 January 2025
282	Ginx TV	Six months after making its debut on Freeview, this HbbTV hybrid streaming eGaming channel left for Channelbox after problems with the channel found it struggling to load on some Freeview Play devices.	Channelbox	22 January 2025
281	Extreme Channel	This channel launched on Freeview in June 2024 and also decided to give up its slot in favour of Channelbox in 2025.	Channelbox	15 February 2025
7 (NI)	NVTV	This local television channel's licence was transferred to That's TV, with provision made for Northern Visions' community programming to be included in the schedule. Other services provided by Northern Visions continue as normal.	That's TV (Belfast)	23 April 2025
7 (LTVmux)	Sheffield Live	This local television channel's licence was transferred to That's TV, with Sheffield Live! continuing to run their community radio station and website.	That's TV (Sheffield)/Sheffield Live! (radio)	23 April 2025
733	Trans World Radio	Trans World Radio went online only at the end of March 2025.	twr.org.uk	23 April 2025
258	Real Crime	This channel also decided to give up its slot in favour of Channelbox in 2025.	Channelbox	21 May 2025
93	ITVBe +1	Channel removed from EPG on 16 July 2025.	ITV Quiz (Channel 28)	9 June 2025
285	Trace UK	Came to Freeview on 26 March 2025. Channel continues as a FAST channel on services like Samsung TV Plus (UK), with Trace also having a number of channels found streaming via Channelbox.	Channelbox	16 July 2025
213	Moochi TV	This is a FAST streaming channel for pre-school children which also acquired a Freeview slot in November 2023.	FAST services	20 August 2025
262	Shots!	This was the television spin-off of the National World newspaper portal, closed after new owners Media Concierge/Iconic Newspapers bought the company and refocused on their print titles. The reports shown on Shots! continue to be uploaded to the main National World site and the sites of the local newspaper titles it owned.	nationalworld.com	20 August 2025
7	Notts TV	This local television channel's licence wasn't renewed by the NTU. Channel removed from EPG on 17 September 2025.		30 August 2025

== See also ==
- Digital terrestrial television in the United Kingdom
- Local television in the United Kingdom
- Freeview (UK)
- ITV Digital
- Top Up TV
