= Vision TV Network =

British IPTV service

VisionTV
- Country: United Kingdom
- Broadcast area: National
- Headquarters: London, England

Ownership
- Owner: Vision247

History
- Launched: February 8, 2012 (Vision TV Network); 2019 (VisionTV/VTC)
- Closed: April 30, 2019 (Vision TV Network); November 22, 2023 (VisionTV on Freeview)
- Former names: VisionTV (2012-2019)

Links
- Website: www.visiontv.co.uk

Vision TV Network is a television channel distribution service provided by Vision247 Ltd in the United Kingdom. The service carries around 35 channels in English and other languages, streamed from the internet and accessed via Freeview channel 264, EE TV boxes, mobile apps or the web.

== History ==
When Vision TV was launched in 2012, it provided viewers in the UK with access to a package of foreign TV channels. Viewers had to subscribe online in order to watch pay TV channels on the Vision TV Network, which were delivered through data channels (110, 111 and 112) on Freeview HD set-top boxes, and later to Roku players. As an IPTV service, the network also allowed two-way interactivity to enable functionality such as voting, commerce and targeted advertising.

The service initially broadcast French, Greek, Polish and Turkish channels. In August 2012, Muslim and Arabic-language channels were added. In March 2015, a Portuguese package called 'My Portuguese' was added, which included Benfica TV. In September 2015 the service became available on the web, as well as EE TV set-top boxes. In November 2015, iOS and Android apps were launched.

The UK pay-TV service closed down on 30 April 2019 and was no longer available on Roku or mobile devices, though a separate package of free channels continued to stream online and via Freeview.

== Visiontv. on Freeview ==
In addition to the subscription package of foreign language television channels on Roku/Now TV and Android devices, Vision247 launched a second service via Freeview channel 264. Now branded as VisionTV (styled as Visiontv.), this free-to-view streaming service features a number of English-language channels with news and religious programming from around the world.

At the end of 2020, Visiontv. launched their own channel VTC (Vision TV Channel, styled as vtc. ) as part of their entertainment channels line-up and added Newsmax TV and Syria TV to their news channels.

On 22 November 2023, their main streaming portal was taken off Freeview with TV Extra being added instead. Vision247's other channels remained in Freeview's streaming line-up though Asharq News moved to channel 274, as MBC (My Binge Channel) took their previous channel 272 slot. Arise News was also taken from Freeview channel 262 at the same time but continues to be broadcast by Vision247 via the visiontv.co.uk website.

== Vision247 and Mondo Globo on Freeview ==
As well as their own streaming portal, Vision247 Limited has teamed up with Canadian firm Mondo Globo to secure a more permanent channel position in the streaming area of Freeview for a number of Arabic channels. This has included a slot on Freeview channel 272 for Asharq News and channel 273 for MBC's Al Arabiya and Al Hadath services.

== VisionTV website channel line-up ==
The channel line-up, as of 22 November 2022, on the visiontv.co.uk streaming service is as follows:

=== Entertainment ===
- Vision TV Channel
- SatinTV
- NTAI
- Supreme Master TV
- ARISEPlay
- Channel 7

=== News ===
- France24 English
- CGTN
- Newsmax TV
- Arise News
- Deutsche Welle
- France24 (French language)

=== Sports ===
- eSports24.tv

=== TV Mall ===
- JML Direct
- Jewellery Channel
- Best Direct

=== Religion ===
- Secrets Unsealed Ministry TV
- Faith TV
- Good News TV
- Daystar TV

=== International ===
- Iran International TV
- Sharjah TV
- Islam Channel
- British Muslim TV
- Sikh Channel

== Freeview channel line-up ==
Channels found on the Freeview visiontv. streaming service, which was on Freeview until 22 November 2022, included:

- Arise News
- Arise Play (formally Live360)
- Al Araby Television
- Al Araby2
- Best Direct
- Brit Asia TV (An ex-Channelbox service)
- British Muslim TV
- Channel 7 (formally GNTV)
- Daystar
- DW English
- Edgy TV (broadcasting programmes from FTV.com)
- eSports24.tv
- Faith World TV
- France 24 French (also broadcasting via Channelbox)
- Good News TV
- Islam Channel
- Iran International
- JML
- Newsmax
- NTAI
- Propeller TV
- Revelation
- Sharjah TV
- Sikh Channel
- SportyStuffTV
- Supreme Master TV.com
- Syria TV
- Sum TV
- That's TV (only available via Vision TV on Freeview ch264, not through their website or app)
- 3ABN (broadcasting a number of separate channels for different languages: Dare to Dream, 3ABN, 3ABN Latino, 3ABN Proclaim!, 3ABN Français, 3ABN Kids, 3ABN Praise Him Music, 3ABN Russia,)
- TJC (The Jewellery Channel)
- UK44
- SinoTV
- Urdu1
- Glory TV
- Firstlight TV
- France 24 English (replaced by the French language version on 20 October 2022)
- Jesus Sanctuary
- Peace TV
- Peace TV Urdu
- Iqra TV
- Iqra TV Bangla
- Hellenic TV 1 (now broadcasts via Channelbox)
- HudaTV
- Spotlight TV (moved to Channelbox and now known as Music & Memories)
- YANGA!
- FashionTV (the main FTV.com channel, now broadcasting via Channelbox)
- Sports Tonight
- CGTN (previously available on Vision TV platform under the name CCTV News)
- ABP News
- Times Now
- Firstlight
- Dunamis TV
- IIPC TV

== Company structure ==
Vision247 is a private limited company, established as Vision IPTV Ltd in 2006 and renamed in 2013. Its sole director is Nduka Obaigbena, who has Nigerian nationality. There were 19 employees in 2019.
