= Caroline Diehl =

British businesswoman

Caroline Diehl MBE is a British businesswoman.

Diehl has an MA Hons. Mod. & Med. Languages from Newnham College, Cambridge University, a PGCE and MA in Educational Administration at UCL's Institute of Education and a diploma in social entrepreneurship from INSEAD Business School. Diehl began her career in 1979 as a manager at publisher and bookseller, Grant and Cutler. Between 1983 and 1987, she worked as a languages teacher and head of year at a London comprehensive, Queen Elizabeth’s School, before moving to the charity sector as head of European fundraising at Community Service Volunteers (CSV) in 1988, then becoming Director of CSV Media, a position she held until 1994.

In 1994, Diehl founded the communications charity Media Trust. In 2000, she founded the Community Channel as a subsidiary company of The Media Trust. Diehl remained chief executive of Media Trust until March 2017. She established the Social Founder Network in 2017.

Diehl is an Entrepreneur in Residence at INSEAD, an Associate of Newnham College, Cambridge, and is the founder trustee of the Small Charities Coalition. In 2004, she was awarded an MBE for services to the media industry.

== Awards ==
- MBE: awarded for services to the media industry, 2004
- EY ‘Social Entrepreneur of the Year’; member of EY Women Entrepreneurs’ Network
- Cannes Chimera Award (Cannes Lions & Bill and Melinda Gates Foundation), 2012
- PRCA Charity Communications Award, 2017

== See also ==
- Together (TV channel)
