= PREMature =

- Genre: Drama; Avant-garde
- Created by: Rohith S. Katbamna
- Written by: Rohith S. Katbamna
- Directed by: Rohith S. Katbamna
- Starring: Karanvir Bhupal; Daniel Costello; Meera Ganatra; Manish Patel; Samantha Shellie; Tom Carter; Simi Dhillon; Sam Bonner; Leo Eaglewood; Mirza Hassan; Harold Addo; Surinder Powar
- Composer: John Atterbury
- Country of origin: United Kingdom
- Original language: English
- No. of series: 1
- No. of episodes: 6

Production
- Executive producers: Sobhana S. Katbamna; Dahyibai H. Pankhania
- Producers: Rohith S. Katbamna; Terry Mardi
- Production locations: London; Bournemouth; Bedfordshire; Calais
- Cinematography: Rohith S. Katbamna
- Editor: Rohith S. Katbamna
- Running time: 46-49 minutes
- Production company: Liger Films Ltd.

Original release
- Network: Community Channel
- Release: 22 February – 29 March 2015

PREMature is a British television drama miniseries produced by Liger Films that first aired on the Community Channel. It was crowdfunded through Kickstarter and is the first drama series for the Community Channel, consisting of 6 episodes.

== Synopsis ==
Prem Mehta (Karanvir Bhupal) is a high school teenager who experiences the loss of his grandmother during his summer holidays, closely followed by the separation of his parents. He is forced to take a lonely path during the aftermath of these events as he forms new friendships with the unlikeliest of people.

Throughout his journey, Prem experiences an array of revelations in sometimes surreal circumstances as he builds towards his growth as a young man.

== Cast ==
- Prem Mehta, played by Karanvir Bhupal, is a teenager struggling with his grandmother's death and his parents' separation.
- Will Brown, played by Daniel Costello, is a new student bullied at school and befriended by Prem.
- Neelam Mehta, played by Meera Ganatra, is Prem's mother who's suffering from the loss of her mother and marital problems.
- Parthav Mehta, played by Manish Patel, is Prem's father who's been unfaithful to his wife and feels responsible for the family discord.
- Nina Mehta, played by Samantha Shellie, is Prem's sister who's in a relationship with an older man.
- Jacob Pearce, played by Tom Carter, is a school teacher coping with personal problems while mentoring Prem through his.
- Suhina Qadri, played by Simi Dhillon, is an intelligent student and love interest of Prem's.
- Will's Mother, played by Sam Bonner, is Will's disabled mother who's addiction is destroying her relationship with her son.
- Darren Baisden, played by Leo Eaglewood, is Nina's boyfriend who provides optimism and perspective.
- Sunny Kanda, played by Mirza Hassan, is a school bully who torments Will.
- Theo Clarke, played by Harold Addo, is Sunny's best friend who also instigates Will's negative experiences at school.
- Baa, played by Surinder Powar, is Prem's deceased grandmother who appears as an apparition.

== Production ==
=== Development ===
The series idea was initially conceived in an attempt to bring an unconventional drama series format to a national television audience incorporating experimental techniques familiar in independent and art house films.

A pilot episode was originally shot during 2013 on a budget of £1,000 funded entirely by series creator, Rohith S. Katbamna and co-producer, Terry Mardi. Casting for the pilot involved over 100 performers attending a two-day audition. Performers ranged from professional actors to those who had never acted prior. The process aimed to find performers/people with similar qualities or had personally experienced certain situations as their on-screen characters. It was the director's intention to cast all unknowns.

The title role of Prem Mehta was cast to purposefully go against the mainstream screen look of teenagers. Karanvir Bhupal partly earned the role of Prem Mehta for his distinctive appearance.

After the pilot was completed, it was pitched as a six-part drama series to the Community Channel - a UK broadcaster known primarily for factual content. The series was dubbed as an experimental drama and would contain influences ranging from avant-garde to social realism.

Along with an acquisition fee from the Community Channel, a Kickstarter campaign to raise £35,000 between April - June 2014 took place. The campaign was successful raising £35,333, however this total was reduced to £31,893.77 after administration fees from Kickstarter were collected.

=== Music ===
The score is composed by South African musician, John Atterbury. The composition involved a process of fusing audio manipulation and live instrumentation, concurrently with tape loops, recordings in the field and programming to present the most organic and contemporary sound possible. This entire process concluded with a music score consisting of 97 tracks for all six episodes of PREMature, including the final song, "The Start", featuring vocals by London singer/musician, Donna Thompson.

The theme for the UK trailers was composed by London-based musician Roly Witherow, who had heard about the series through Kickstarter and contacted the director.

== Broadcast ==
=== United Kingdom ===
The series began airing on the Community Channel from 22 February 2015 at a post-watershed time slot due to mature content. This initial broadcast run was made available online to UK based users on two platforms (TVPlayer and TVCatchup) where viewers are able to stream live television.

=== Availability ===
The entire series was made available on YouTube in January 2018.

== Themes ==
With teenage characters at the helm of the story, PREMature delves into issues such as bullying in the form of physical, verbal, psychological and online. Also highlighted are teen anxiety, depression, isolation, identity, drugs and relationships. The one constant is that Prem is forced to confront the divorce of his parents and his grandmother's death simultaneously whilst his friend Will struggles in a single-parent home with his deeply troubled mother.

Throughout the relationship between Nina and Darren, existential discussions are heard questioning existence, social behaviour and the reluctance to accept happiness. Nina talks of cynicism and doubting her place in life whilst Darren attempts to counter these feelings with optimism.

Death is a prominent theme that carries on throughout the series particularly the effect of losing someone close and how certain characters are forced to confront and deal with this new absence from their lives. The way in which a teenager and an adult deal with this theme is examined through their respective paths taken

At times, the story shifts into moments of surreal and often psychedelic sequences that exhibit the inner thoughts and subconscious state of minds of certain characters when found in specific situations of heightened tension or isolation.

== Episodes ==
No.	Title	Directed by	Written by	Original release date
1	"Chapter I: Bad Eggs"	Rohith S. Katbamna	Rohith S. Katbamna	February 22, 2015
Towards the end of Prem's summer holiday, his grandmother passes away and his parents' separate due to his father's extramarital affair with a nurse. On the first day back at school, Prem befriends new boy, Will after coming to his defence at the hands of bullies. His schoolteacher Mr. Pearce, who is suffering from the break up of his own relationship with a married woman, mentors Prem through his troubles. As the day winds down, Prem confronts his father, who has since been forced to leave the family home and sleep at the garage of his car mechanic business.
2	"Chapter II: Saturdays Are For Cunts"	Rohith S. Katbamna	Rohith S. Katbamna	March 1, 2015
With encouragement from Will, Prem tries to talk with Suhina, a classmate, whom he has feelings for. On the following day, Prem and Will discuss life and obstacles in the wilderness before pondering over the idea of attending an adult's only club night, hosted by the brother of one of the school bullies. Prem's sister, Nina arrives home after spending a few nights with her boyfriend, Darren. An argument ensues between mother and daughter. After bonding with his younger cousin, Prem opens his heart to the apparition of his grandmother. Nina and Neelam reconcile at dinner. Prem then meets with Will that evening to take revenge on the bullies at the club night.
3	"Chapter III: Circles"	Rohith S. Katbamna	Rohith S. Katbamna	March 8, 2015
Will is assaulted by his bullies at school after discovering what he did at the club night. The violence continues with confrontations in the school where Prem and Will must defend themselves. In the midst of it, Prem impulsively asks Suhina, who is present, out on a date. Meanwhile, a 'sex-tape' of a student circles online. After school, a fight between Prem, Will and the bullies is broken up by Parthav and Mr. Pearce. Circumstances have Parthav drop Will home where after, Prem breaks down. That night, Mr. Pearce, who had planned to reconcile with his lover, ends up in a drunken fight with two punters after she fails to show. Surprising Neelam, Nina brings home Darren for a family dinner. While they eat happily together, Parthav sits in the car outside eating fast-food.
4	"Chapter IV: Trip16"	Rohith S. Katbamna	Rohith S. Katbamna	March 15, 2015
On a school trip that coincides with Prem's 16th birthday, Will brings a gift in the form of magic mushrooms. After consuming them, they experience their own psychedelic trips, confronting their worst fears and revelations. Darren takes Nina across the English Channel for their own day trip, where she opens up about her pain. Ending up in hospital, the mothers of both Prem and Will meet and talk deeply about their struggles and find a kinship. In the evening, Prem and his family share a birthday dinner at a restaurant. On Prem's invite, his father attends.
5	"Chapter V: Finger Foods & Spiral Moves"	Rohith S. Katbamna	Rohith S. Katbamna	March 22, 2015
After a deep talk between Mr. Pearce and Prem, both come to an understanding that their relationship is a true friendship. The following day, Will tries to give advice to Prem for his first date with Suhina later that day. On their date, Prem experiences his own insecurities and paranoia over whether Suhina really likes him or feels otherwise. At Will's home, his mother attempts to make amends by cooking a meal. Meanwhile, Parthav discovers a lump on his testicle and sees a doctor for a further examination. Neelam finds herself exploring her own sexuality and the idea of trying out as a phone-sex operator. That night, after a successful date, Prem's uncle arrives at Prem's home after his own night out. Drunk, he half-heartedly invites Prem to stay with him.
6	"Chapter VI: Exam"	Rohith S. Katbamna	Rohith S. Katbamna	March 29, 2015
On the morning of his exams, Prem accidentally discover's Nina during a pregnancy test. The result is positive. At school, Will confesses to Prem that he re-uploaded the 'sex-tape' of a classmate to distract his bullies. Prem, distraught, shuns Will and in the process is left alone to be assaulted in the toilets. Parthav and Neelam meet on talking terms. Meanwhile, Nina tells Darren that she is pregnant. He is supportive. After discovering that Will has been assaulted, Prem confronts the bullies before Mr. Pearce breaks them up. Later that night, Prem has a severe breakdown in front of his family and runs from home. After his uncle lets him down and he is unable to get hold of Mr. Pearce, he meets Will and they open up about their friendship and Prem's realisation that he is suffering from depression. In a hopeful end to their conversation, they promise to be there for each other.

== Reception ==
=== Critical response ===
PREMature has received very positive reviews from critics. Asian Culture Vulture gave the series 4 out of 5 stars, stating that "the show takes itself out of the regular television we see today". Trevor Price of TvTrev, summarised that "PREMature is not only an artistic venture bred in Britain but also a social movement in its own right - smashing stereotypes and providing a just representation for ethnic minorities." Nazhat Khan wrote that the series "exposes the disturbing reality in an average family and school in the UK. By throwing us back and forth between extreme emotions, the bold series strangely leaves you with hopes for the future." Commenting on the tone and presentation, Scarlett Leung found the drama to be "grimly funny at times. Daring in its narrative and emotionally powerful in its delivery."
