= Daystar =

Daystar or day star may refer to:

- The Sun
- Day Star, 1878 Kentucky Derby winner
- Daystar (album), a 2020 album by Canadian recording artist Tory Lanez
- DayStar Digital, a company that used to manufacture Apple Macintosh clones
- Daystar Productions, see The Outer Limits (1963 TV series)
- Daystar Television Network, an evangelical Christian satellite network
- Daystar University, a Christian liberal arts college located in Kenya
- Daystar, a 2002 studio album by shoegazing band Lab Partners
- Daystar Peterson, also known as Tory Lanez, Canadian singer and rapper
- A character in Patricia C. Wrede's Enchanted Forest Chronicles
- A virus created to kill vampires in the horror film Blade: Trinity
- Rosalie Mae Jones, Native American dancer and choreographer who performers under the name Daystar
  - DAYSTAR: Contemporary Dance-Drama of Indian America, a dance company founded by Rosalie Mae Jones
- Lucifer, a name that in English generally refers to the Devil or Satan
- Venus, as it appears on the morning or evening horizon

== See also ==
- Morning Star (disambiguation)
