= London 360 =

Magazine-style news show on the Community Channel

London360 is a magazine-style news show on the Community Channel (Sky 539-Virgin Media 233-Freeview 87-BT Vision), and local London TV channel London Live. London360 opinion articles can also be seen in the websites of The Huffington Post and The Voice, as well as seen on MTV UK online and be heard on BBC Radio London.

The programme covers news and events from all around the UK's capital city, offering young Londoners an opportunity to get their voice heard.

== Aim ==
The initiative is run by charity, Media Trust and funded by City Bridge Trust and supported by Noel Clarke, Edde Nestor and Alesha Dixon.

The scheme also gives media training to 120 young Londoners. The show's media partners include The Voice newspaper, Mobo.com, Celebrity Intelligence and TV Collective. They also have a regular slot on Eddie Nestor's show The Rum Shop on BBC Radio London on a Friday night as well as regular challenges on West London community radio station WestsideFM.

== Appearances ==
Celebrities that have appeared on London360 include Idris Elba (actor), Russell Brand (comedian / actor), Ed Vaizey (Minister For Culture), Liz Hurley (actress), Professor Green (musician), Alesha Dixon (personality), Dynamo (magician), Boris Johnson, Estelle, Marco Pierre White, Timothy Campbell, Chipmunk, David Blunkett, Jay Sean, Preeya Kalidas, Lee Jasper, Wretch32 (musician), Cory Monteith, Steve Redgrave and Jon Snow.

== Crew ==
The reporters for the show are:

Series 1 Annabelle Afful, Fozia Nasir, Funmi Olutoye, Holly Powell-Jones, Krystina Meens, Latisha Ma, Maleena Pone, Sai Kumar, Simon Constantine and Stephanie Eniafe Coker.

Series 2 Christinah Adegasoye, Emily Brown, Marissa Forrester, Lauren Hawkins, Carina Nava Johnson, Rose Manley, Rosa Doherty, Tasha Mathur, Abdullah Moalim and Helena Poole.

Series 3 Crystal Straker, Charley Dunlop, Flaminia Giambalvo, Jenner Cole, Jyoti Kumar, Lawrence John Mason, Riaz Jugon, Tayana Simons, Yaw Busia and Zaneta Denny.

Series 4 Kiran Kaur, Nyima Pratten, Alex MacDonald, Valentina Etaghene and Eliot Goward.

Series 5 Iram Sarwar, Kirsty Morrissey, Danielle Osman, Marvin Williams and Fez Sayed.

Series 6 Alex Garlitos, Jide Amao, Nick Krause, Aaron Page, Pete Lines and Teh Aik Hui.

Series 7 Usman Butt, Jessica Onah, Hope Lanek, Michael Walsh, Ellie Holland, Hetty Ashiagbor.

Series 8 David Ready, Hanan Bihi, Fisayo Fadahunsi, Sofia Couceiro, Yasmine Tabase, Drew McGregor.

Series 9 Fred Bhat, Ikran Dahir, Rishi Persaud, Farhat Saede, Jordaan Shelley, Suna Yokes.

Series 10 Lape Banjo, Laurelle Campbell, Ranel Felix, Savan Gandecha, Daryl Hammond, Yasmine Tanwidjaja-Pajares.

Series 11 Ony Anukem, Fayida Jailler, Carissa Jumu, Nazreen Osman, Kavita Gajjar.

Series 12 Kate Acheng, Joseph Aspinall, Hannah Burns, Afia Kufuor, Francesca Nicholls, Bethel Tesfaye

Executive editor for London360 is: Jasmine Dotiwala

Project manager: Reshma Biring

The fortnightly show is produced by the series' current reporters and is aired on Community Channel twenty times within the two-week period: Mondays and Thursdays at 7 am, 7 pm, noon and midnight. Sundays at noon and midnight. It is also broadcast on Sundays, 6.30am on London Live.

The London360 programme has now come to an end.
