= Glory TV =

British television channel

- Country: United Kingdom
- Headquarters: London, Slough

Ownership
- Owner: Glory TV Foundation
- Key people: Pam Munir and Sarfraz Munir

History
- Launched: 2008

Links
- Website: http://glorytv.co.uk

Glory TV (Punjabi: ਗਲੋਰੀ ਟੀਵੀ) (Urdu: گلوری ٹیوی) is an international Christian non-denominational television channel catering to the British Indian and British Pakistani Christian communities, offering religious programming primarily in Punjabi and Urdu. It is the first Christian channel broadcasting live and recorded programming in Punjabi and Urdu within Europe.

Glory TV is based in London, with recording of various programs taking place in key Christian communities in the United Kingdom such as Slough, Hounslow, Leicester, Wolverhampton, Southall, Glasgow and other areas with prominent British Asian churches. Programs are also recorded in and broadcast from Italy, France and the Netherlands, where Punjabi- and Urdu-speaking Christians are located. Religious programming and tour footage from Israel are also shown on a daily basis.

Programming on occasion has also been aired in Gujarati and Nepali alongside English.

== History ==
Pam Munir is an Indian-born Sikh British national who established the channel alongside her husband Sarfraz Munir, a Pakistani-born non-practicing Christian and singer, after they both converted to Christianity following a religious encounter which led to Pam leaving Sikhism and Sarfraz becoming a practising Christian. The couple worked from a rented studio in London alongside a small team to produce Christian content on evangelism and Biblical teaching whilst being completely voluntarily funded and creating live programming whilst editing prerecorded footage. They currently are based mainly within Slough. The Munirs have four children together.

In 2014 Glory TV went off the air for a short time due to not being able to provide its broadcasting fees due to lack of funding as the channel relies entirely upon viewer donations.

== Broadcasting ==
=== Regular content on Glory TV ===
- Geet aur Zabur (psalms and Punjabi/Urdu Christian nasheed)
- Holy Land Tour (tour from Israel)
- Kalicia (discussion on Biblical topics)
- Awaam (global news affecting the Church)
- Bible Ki Nabouat (Biblical prophesy teaching)
- Meri Gawahi (talk show)
- Bandgi (worship)
- Aaj Ki Dish (South Asian cuisine show)
- Holy Bible Ki Baatein (Bible study)
- Masihi Sangeet (home church meetings)
- Khuda Ka Kalaam (Bible study)
