= Music & Memories =

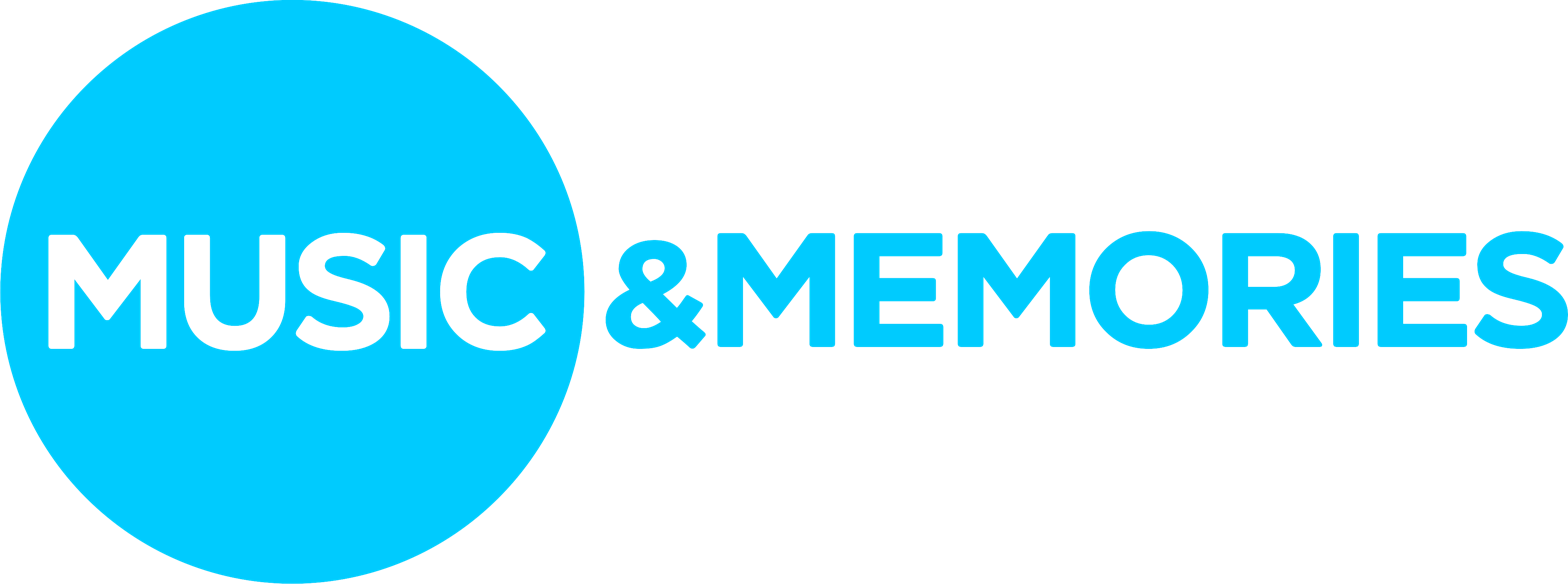
- Country: United Kingdom
- Network: Keep It Country TV Ltd

Programming
- Language: English
- Picture format: 1080p HDTV (upscaled)

History
- Launched: 21 April 2010
- Former names: Showcase 2 (2010-2014); Showcase (2014-2016); Keep It Country (2016-2019); Spotlight TV (2019-2022)

Links
- Website: musicandmemories.tv musicandmemories.uk

Availability

Terrestrial
- Freeview: Channel 271 (Channelbox)

Streaming media
- Music & Memories: Watch live
- Channelbox: iOS & Android

Music & Memories is a British music television channel available via the Freeview streaming service Channelbox.

== History ==
The channel launched on Sky on 21 April 2010 as Showcase 2 on channel 216. On 1 September 2010, following the removal of Channel M and launch of Showcase +1 (which itself was replaced by fellow music channel WTF (then became Massive R&B, Planet Pop, Chilled TV and Now 90s)), it moved to channel 203. On 3 July 2012, following a Sky EPG reshuffle, it moved to channel 192.

On 3 December 2013, a timeshift channel launched on Sky channel 293, which moved to channel 238 on 19 August 2014 following another EPG clean-up. Showcase 2 was renamed as Showcase following the previous first channel's rebrand to Irish TV the previous month. On 1 June 2015, the timeshift channel closed and was replaced by Property Show. It moved to Sky channel 261 on 17 August 2015 following the closure of True Entertainment +1 and to free space for AMC from BT.

On 17 February 2016, the channel moved to Sky channel 389, being relabelled as Keep It Country the next month (it was previously a block). Operated by Phil Mack Country, the channel initially broadcast for 17 hours of each day because space for third party content left over from Showcase still had to be broadcast. It launched on Freesat at the beginning of March 2016.

On 31 May 2016, the channel launched on Freeview, broadcasting via COM7 which is available to around 75% of the UK.

From 26 January 2017 to 1 February 2017, Keep It Country was temporarily removed from Sky channel 389.

On 1 May 2018, following another EPG reshuffle, Keep It Country moved from Sky channel 389 to 376.

On 21 January 2019, the channel changed Freeview multiplex and increased its reach from 75% of the UK to 90% but it was removed from the platform in June 2019.

The channel was renamed as Spotlight TV on 1 July 2019 and broadcasts on Freeview in the Greater Manchester area. After a short break in transmission the channel also moved to the "Hybrid TV channel" VisionTV (Channel 264 on Freeview), so people in the UK could watch it if they had a 'connected TV' [available to devices connected to the internet].

Early 2022, the channel had a shift and is now shown on SKY TV 365 or Freesat 500.

When Spotlight TV dissolved and became Music and Memories, a block of repeated and new programmes are now shown on Sky Channel 186 on Ayozat TV.

=== Phil Mack and BARB ===
On 10 July 2022, Phil Mack confirmed that Spotlight TV would be leaving Freesat and Sky on 31 August, with Mack blaming BARB, which affected the cost he could sell advertising on the channel whose viewing figures had underestimated the success of the channel and the monthly charge of £82,000 which allowed Spotlight to have its own channel number on the various platforms. Mack stated that BARB's figures were unfair as they were based on a small survey of 5,200 viewers with many of those panel members not being fans of Irish country music, resulting in an unfair zero rating for the channel when Mack recorded thousands of fans tuning in, with Mack stating in the past that Memory Lane had a weekly reach of 1.2 million. He also stated that the Memory Lane show on 31 August 2022 would be his last and that he planned on starting a new channel called Music & Memories, which would be broadcast on FAST streaming service Channelbox via Freeview channel 271. Mack also stated that he would be taking legal action against BARB over the reporting of the viewing figures and suggested that people contact Nadine Dorries, the UK'S Culture, Media and Digital Secretary to complain.

On 31 August 2022, after Spotlight TV was added to Channelbox under its normal channel name, it was removed from Sky and Freesat. It was removed from VisionTV (channel 264) a few days later.

In early September Spotlight TV was renamed Music & Memories. The version of Music & Memories on musicandmemories.tv carries no advertising and has a black on-screen bug, while the version on Channelbox carries advertising and has a white on-screen bug. In late September the channel moved to musicandmemories.uk and now has a white on-screen bug.

Currently the owners search for funding a new satellite channel

== Programming ==
The majority of the channel's output is country music but recently the channel has added a "small number of shows from other genres," mostly oldies and classic hits from the second half of the 20th century, to encourage more viewers to watch the channel as part of its overall growth plans. As of 2022, the nostalgic television network hosts a variety of hour-long themed programmes such as The Irish Music Hour hosted by Phil Mack & Natasha Magee, American Country Mix or Stacey Jackson In The 80s hosted by Stacey Jackson.

=== Programmes and presenters ===
- American Country Mix
- Brolly & Friends with Bob Brolly
- Caitlin’s Country with Caitlin Murtagh
- Country Jamboree with Marisa D’Amato
- Glenn Rogers Crazy World
- Hayley’s Happy Hour with Hayley Sparkes
- Kelly Talks Country with Paul Kelly
- Maria’s Gospel Hour with Maria Doherty
- Sarah Jory’s Hot Picks with Sarah Jory
- Saturday Night With Hayley Palmer with Hayley Palmer
- Shauna’s Country with Shauna McStravock
- Stacey Jackson In The 80s
- Steve’s Country Showdown with Steve Bloor, Louise Morrissey and Ed Holland
