= Best Direct =

European home shopping television channel

Ownership
- Owner: Best Direct (International) Ltd.

Links
- Website: www.bestdirect.tv

Best Direct is a home shopping television channel, broadcast in the United Kingdom on the Sky platform. Additionally the channel is available free-to-air on the Eutelsat 28A satellite.

== History ==
The Best Direct channel is owned and operated by Best Direct International Ltd. Best Direct International was formed in 1992; however, the roots of the company can be traced back to the late 1940s when William Levene (the father of the company's current chairman, Michael Levene) exhibited household products he had obtained worldwide at county shows, fairs and exhibitions.

On 14 January 2002, a sister channel – Let's Go Shopping, launched on Sky Digital. Let's Go Shopping was renamed as Best Direct + in February 2004, becoming a secondary timeshift service. In November 2009, Best Direct +'s EPG slot on Sky was sold, and became known as Blueberry TV. Best Direct continued to supply programming for the network, under a block named "Best Fitness" until Blueberry TV's sale to QVC UK in Mid-2010.

Best Direct launched on Telewest in July 2002. In 2007, Best Direct became available to ex-NTL areas on Virgin Media, replacing Thane Direct. Best Direct was removed from Virgin Media altogether on 17 January 2014.

From 16 September 2008, Best Direct was also broadcast on the Freesat platform (channel 813), but was removed on 21 April 2009 (Later relaunched in 2016 but re-removed in 2017–2018)

In Germany, the TV broadcaster 9Live broadcast advertising from Best Direct.
