= Together TV =

British free-to-air television channel

Programming
- Picture format: 576i (16:9 SDTV)

Ownership
- Owner: The Community Channel

History
- Launched: 18 September 2000

Links
- Website: togethertv.com

Availability

Terrestrial
- Freeview: Channel 83 (6:00PM-12:00AM only), IP simulcast (12:00AM-6:00PM) Channel 90 IP simulcast (24 hours)
- Sky UK: Channel 170
- Virgin Media: Channel 136
- freesat: Channel 162

Together TV (formerly The Community Channel) is a British free-to-air television channel owned by The Community Channel, a community benefit society. The channel targets a women's audience aged 40 to 60, with programming related to health and wellness, hobbies, and creativity.

The channel was initially launched on 18 September 2000 as The Community Channel, with programming centered around promoting volunteerism and charitable organizations. It was initially backed by other British broadcasters who provided resources and other programming to the service. After selling its previous Freeview slot to A&E Networks in 2017, the channel re-launched on Freeview in January 2018 under its current name.

== History ==
=== 1990s ===
In 1999, Caroline Diehl's initiative to create Community Channel was supported by Elisabeth Murdoch of BSkyB, Home Office minister Paul Boateng and Cabinet Office minister Lord Falconer.

=== 2000s ===
Logo used until 15 December 2009

Community Channel launched on 18 September 2000 as a two-hour "ethical shopping channel" that let charities showcase their merchandise across the United Kingdom.

By 2002, the channel had increased its broadcast hours from three to twelve per day (8 am to 8 pm). It was one of the first 30 free-to-view channels on the digital terrestrial platform Freeview, and the BBC agreed to supply relevant programming from its archive. The channel co-produced a volunteering series with ITV's campaigning programme That's Esther. Jane Mote, an editor at BBC London, joined as channel controller in November 2002.

In 2004, the channel launched the drama series Kismet Road, commissioned by the Department of Health to promote good health. It used Asian actors and writers, and its dialogue included Urdu and Punjabi. That year it also introduced an interactive television donation service, developed by Sky Interactive, which gave selected charities an on-air presence and a red button fundraising feature at no cost to them. Its Freeview slot moved from overnight to daytime, and an interactive television campaign on the channel raised £1 million for victims of the 2004 Indian Ocean earthquake and tsunami.

In 2005, Nick Ware, formerly creative director of BBC Learning, became channel controller, and the channel became available on NTL for 24 hours a day. It marked the Year of the Volunteer with programmes about people who gave their time to good causes, including Beach Lovers and Charity Chic.

In 2006, the channel launched YourCharitySpace, an online area where visitors could blog about charity issues and donate through a page on the Charities Aid Foundation website. In December it began a campaign, "Give More, Get More, Volunteer", to make volunteering more accessible to marginalised groups.

In 2007, it launched Charge TV, an interactive initiative for young film-makers described as "YouTube with a conscience", which ran for five series. BBC Future Media's Daren Forsyth joined Media Trust as director of innovation and new media, leading digital projects across its services, including the channel.

On 21 January 2009, the channel launched a British Sign Language zone offering programmes with signing, and it worked again with The Scout Association on the six-part series Scout TV.

=== 2010s ===
In 2010, the channel launched Community Champions with the agency Heavenly, in which the public nominated and voted for local figures. The five winners featured in a documentary. It also partnered with Looking Local on a red button service on Sky.

London360, a series made by young reporters trained in journalism and production, launched in June 2011, and the channel began a simulcast block on Manchester's local channel Channel M that September, which ran until that channel closed in April 2012. In 2012, the channel and The Sunday Times launched "The Change Makers", a competition to nominate people with a positive community impact, won by the founder of Street Soccer Scotland. The same year it broadcast Sleep Out Live, its first live event, in partnership with Centrepoint and six other youth homelessness charities.

In 2014, the channel repeated The Change Makers with The Sunday Times as a search for the United Kingdom's social innovator of the year, which Joe Dickinson won for a service in which postal workers check on vulnerable people in Jersey. On 22 February 2015, it premiered its first drama series, PREMature, which had been funded through Kickstarter with additional co-production funding from the channel. In March 2015, the channel moved to a Freeview HD multiplex on channel 109 to make room for the launch of Horror Channel.

In 2016, the channel ran a crowdfunding campaign offering ownership shares from £50, and raised £393,000 in 47 days against a target of £300,000. In September 2016 it became a community benefit society, with elected directors joining its board, and in October it moved from standard-definition to high-definition Freeview.

In mid-2017, the channel's Freeview licence was transferred to TCC Broadcasting Limited. In August the channel ceased broadcasting on Freeview, and TCC Broadcasting was sold to A&E Networks UK, allowing A&E's Blaze to move to channel 63. The channel relaunched as Together on 16 January 2018 on Freeview channel 93, with a new name chosen after a survey and focus groups. In July 2019, the main channel moved to Freeview channel 89 and Together TV+1 took over channel 93. On 8 July 2019, "TV" was added to the name.

=== 2020s ===
In March 2020, at the start of the COVID-19 pandemic, the channel launched You Are Not Alone with Mutual Aid UK and Public Health England, turning its office landline into a helpline that matched people in isolation with local mutual aid groups. Together TV+1 ended its Freeview transmissions on 15 February 2021. In March 2021, the channel launched the Diverse Film Fund with 29 media and charity partners, commissioning five £10,000 short films, and in October it launched on Sky Glass as an internet-delivered channel. Its gardening and mental health campaign, the Sunflower Challenge, began in 2021 and returned in later years.

In 2022, the fund's second round, "Queer Lives Today", produced four films that premiered at the BFI London Film Festival. One of them, Always, Asifa, was nominated for the BAFTA Television Award for Best Short Form Programme in 2023. On 29 June 2022, the channel became a HbbTV service on Freeview after its multiplex closed. Viewers whose televisions did not support HbbTV could watch it from 3 am to 7 am. In September 2022, Lisa Opie succeeded Caroline Diehl as executive chair. On 26 October 2022, the HbbTV channel became Together+1 on channel 92, while the main channel took a temporary slot on channel 83 running from 5 am to 3 am.

The channel marked its 25th anniversary in September 2023 with an event at the House of Lords. On 24 January 2024, it added an internet-delivered high-definition service, Together TV IP, on channel 285, and Together+1 moved to channel 92. On 20 March 2024, its Freeview hours were reduced to 6 pm to midnight, sharing channel 89 with Shop on TV. The Diverse Film Fund's "Life Beyond Labels" round produced three short documentaries by deaf, disabled and neurodivergent filmmakers.

In 2025, the channel acquired programmes from Channel 4 and the BBC, including The Great House Giveaway and Bill Bailey's Australian Adventure, along with a number of 1960s and 1970s British films such as Futtocks End and The Stick Up.

== Current programming ==
- Ade in Britain (formerly on ITV)
- An Outage
- Battersea Junction – Stories from the Winstanley and York Road Estates (a documentary put together by Wandsworth Heritage Service and Year 6 children from Falconbrook Primary School).
- Brewing Stories
- Britain's Scenic Railways (from Channel 4)
- Changing Rooms (Channel 4 series)
- Cruise TV by LoveitBookit
- Doctor Thorne (TV series with Tom Hollander as Doctor Thorne)
- Elizabeth I (2005 TV series with Helen Mirren)
- Episodes (sitcom with Stephen Mangan, Tamsin Greig, and Matt LeBlanc)
- Eric, Ernie and Me (BBC Four television film)
- Garden Rescue (formerly on BBC One)
- Hello Campers (an oral history of Britain's holiday camps)
- Kirstie and Phil Love It or List It (from Channel 4)
- The Last Miners
- My Grandparents' War (documentary series from Channel 4)
- Queer Lives Today
- Rare Breed: A Farming Year (UTV Ireland programme)
- Respectable: The Mary Millington Story (a documentary directed by Simon Sheridan)
- This Farming Life (BBC Scotland series)
- Tudor Farm/Victorian Farm (BBC historic farm series)
- Victorian Pharmacy (another BBC series with Ruth Goodman)
- Wild Coasts of Scotland with Darcey Bussell (from Channel 4)
- Yorkshire's Worst Mining Disaster (the story of the Oaks Colliery Disaster of 1866)
