= Shop on TV =

- Country: UK
- Broadcast area: UK & Ireland

Programming
- Picture format: 1080i/1080p HDTV (downscaled to 576i SDTV on Freeview)

History
- Launched: 1 December 2023 (as a strand on ITV1); 20 March 2024 (as a standalone channel on Freeview)
- Closed: 6 April 2011 (as a standalone channel on Sky)
- Replaced by: PaversShoes.tv

Links
- Website: https://www.shopontv.co.uk

Availability

Terrestrial
- Freeview: Channel 89 (Midnight until 6pm only)

Shop on TV is a late night shopping programming strand on ITV1 and STV, a livestream on YouTube and a standalone home shopping television channel, broadcast in the United Kingdom and Ireland on the DTT platform via Freeview and formally in the channel's first run, on the Freesat and Sky digital satellite platforms.

== History ==
=== Original run ===
Shop on TV claimed to appeal to regular viewers and purchasers from other shopping channels. However, unlike most other UK shopping channels, there were no live or interactive broadcasts shown on Shop on TV. All content on the channel was made up of pre-recorded infomercials that were between 15 and 30 minutes. The channel broadcast 24 hours a day, 7 days a week.

On 10 September 2009, Shop on TV was removed from the Freesat platform, where it had been on channel 807.

On 10 March 2011, it was announced that Shop on TV's Sky EPG slot on channel 659 had been sold to Pavers Shoes who would launch their own channel (PaversShoes.tv) on 6 April. Shop on TV would therefore close.

=== Relaunch as a programming strand and standalone channel ===
Following the collapse of the original Ideal World and the relaunch of that channel in 2023, Shop on TV had been gradually relaunched since December of the same year. Shop on TV initially launched as a programming strand on ITV1 and STV at midnight on 1 December 2023, replacing their Ideal World programming strand with former hosts from the latter channel. The strand runs from midnight until 3am on ITV1 and STV.

It broadcasts twenty four hours a day, seven days a week on the Shop on TV app and the channel's website.

20 March 2024 saw Shop on TV being relaunched as a standalone shopping channel on a regular basis when the channel launched on the Freeview DTT platform on channel 89. Viewers could watch all of the live shows throughout the day and buy the products advertised on the channel by the app, by the channel's website or by their phone lines. The standalone channel runs every day from midnight until 6pm on Freeview channel 89 and timeshares on the platform with Together TV on channel 83, which runs from 6pm until midnight.

=== Introduction of Cruise1st.tv simulcast ===
On 1 July 2024, Shop on TV started simulcasting with Cruise1st.tv from 1pm to 4pm daily on Freeview channel 89, therefore actual programming from Shop on TV are on channel 89 on Freeview from midnight to 1pm and 4pm to 6pm daily. Most recently, Shop on TV has broadcast a 30-minute Cruise 1st show airing multiple times throughout the day. In early 2025, this was dropped.

=== Schedule changes ===
In August 2025, Shop on TV midnight to 3am started to go live on the Freeview 89 channel
