= My Binge Channel =

MBC
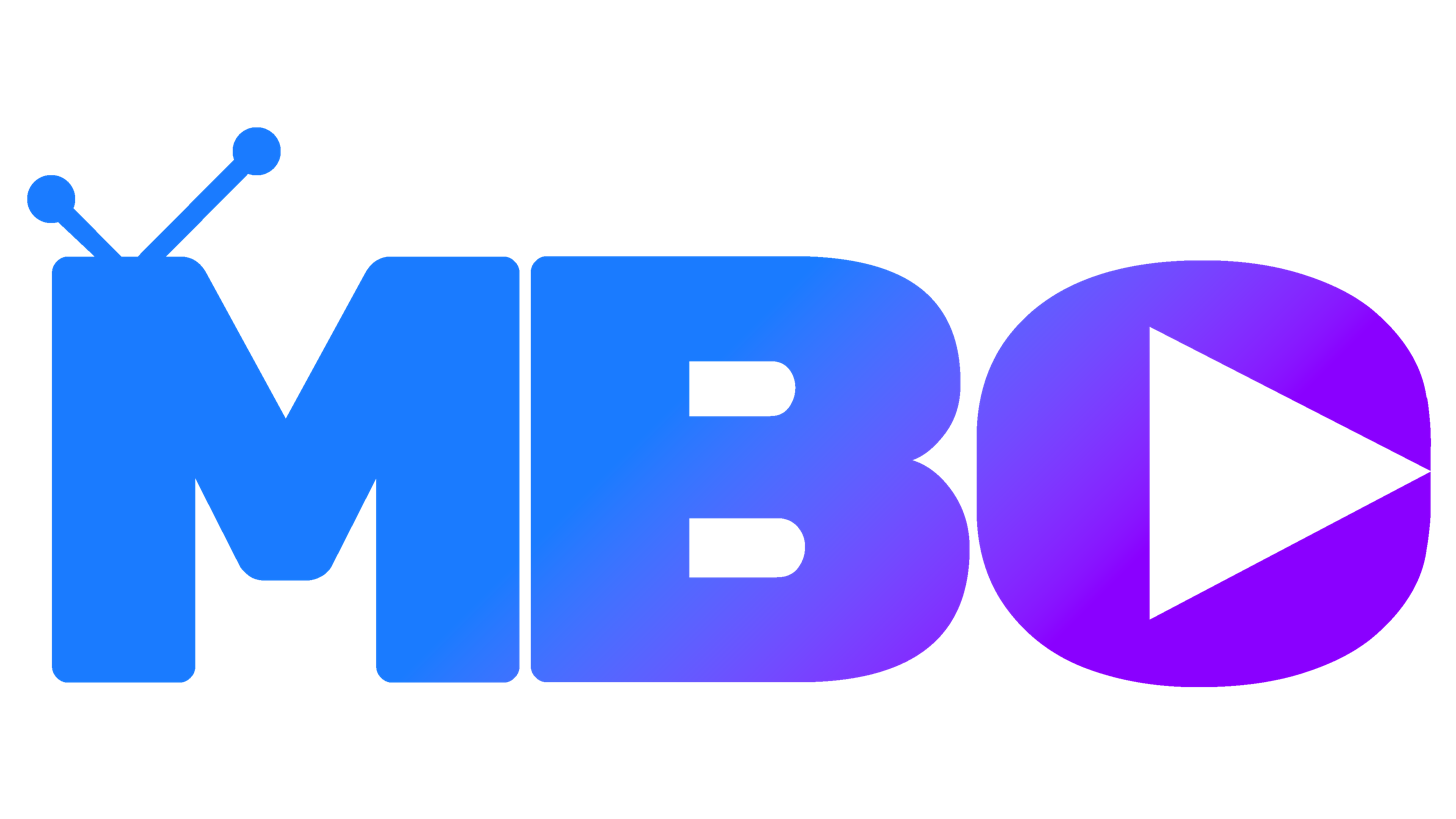
- Country: United Kingdom
- Headquarters: Isle of Man

Programming
- Language: English
- Picture format: 720p

Ownership
- Owner: Go See TV
- Sister channels: Trailblazer Television; Odyssey TV (UK)

History
- Launched: 22 November 2023; 2 years ago

Links
- Website: www.mybingechannel.com

Availability

Terrestrial
- Freeview: Channel 259
- Freely: Channel 562

MBC (My Binge Channel) is a British English-language television service owned by Go See TV. The service is available via the Freeview terrestrial network and Freely IPTV network. MBC operates as a portal-style television channel using hybrid broadcast–broadband channel (HbbTV) technology, providing access to multiple themed FAST channels and on-demand content through an interactive application rather than a single continuous linear feed. Content available on the service is supplied by Lionsgate and A&E Networks.

The service incorporates seven themed channels accessible via the application menu, MovieSphere by Lionsgate, Lifetime Movies, Rookie Blue, Mr. Bean, and 8 Out of 10 Cats.

MBC broadcasts on Freeview channel 259 and Freely channel 562 in the United Kingdom.

== Description ==
MBC is positioned as a multi-genre entertainment service offering films, drama, reality programming, and lifestyle content. Rather than operating solely as a single linear channel, the service uses an HbbTV-enabled application menu to provide viewers with access to a curated selection of themed channels alongside on-demand content.

According to the channel’s on-air description, MBC is designed to deliver a continuously curated, binge-style viewing experience, with programming selected to highlight notable moments across multiple genres rather than traditional scheduled viewing. The service emphasises short-form discovery and extended viewing across its linear and on-demand offerings.

== Channels and programming ==
=== Linear channels ===
Programming on MBC is supplied primarily by Lionsgate and A&E Networks. Rather than broadcasting a single continuous schedule, the service provides access to a selection of themed linear channels through its HbbTV application interface. These channels include a combination of single-brand programme streams and film-focused channels.

The following linear channels are available via the MBC application menu:

- MovieSphere by Lionsgate - A film-focused channel offering a rotating selection of premium titles, ranging from major studio releases to independent films.
- Lifetime Movies - A movie channel from A&E Networks featuring drama and thriller films, often centred on family relationships, suspense, and contemporary social themes.
- Rookie Blue - A police drama series, originally from eOne Television, following the professional and personal lives of five newly graduated police officers.
- Mr. Bean - A comedy series created by and starring Rowan Atkinson, featuring the largely silent and eccentric character Mr. Bean as he navigates everyday situations in unconventional and often absurd ways. The series is known for its visual humour and has achieved international popularity through its minimal dialogue and universal appeal.
- 8 Out of 10 Cats - A comedy panel show produced by Banijay for Channel 4, originally hosted by Jimmy Carr. The programme uses statistics and opinion polls as a basis for humorous discussion, with celebrity guests and team captains debating topical issues and popular culture.

=== On-demand content ===
In addition to its linear channel offerings, MBC provides on-demand access to selected programming through its interactive application. The on-demand catalogue includes content from MovieSphere by Lionsgate and is updated on a monthly basis. On-demand content is accessed via the red button and navigated through the “Movies & Shows” section of the MBC interface.

Content on MBC is free to watch with adverts and requires no sign-in or subscriptions.

== Format and technology ==
MBC is delivered as a hybrid broadcast–broadband television service. This allows the service to combine traditional terrestrial broadcast distribution with broadband-delivered interactive features, including additional channels and on-demand content. Interactive functionality is accessed via the red button, which opens the MBC app menu and electronic programme guide.

=== Access and availability ===
Access to MBC requires a Freeview-compatible television with HbbTV support that is connected to both a terrestrial aerial and the internet. Availability is dependent on regional Freeview coverage within the United Kingdom. Viewers can confirm reception availability using the Freeview Channel Checker.

In cases where the service is not available following launch or channel updates, a television retune may be required.

MBC is available on the following platforms:

- Freeview: Channel 259 (United Kingdom)
- Freely: Channel 562 (United Kingdom)

=== Privacy and consent management ===
MBC operates using digital advertising technology designed to comply with industry standards for user privacy and consent. The service is certified under version 2.2 of the Interactive Advertising Bureau Transparency and Consent Framework (TCF), which provides a standardised approach for managing user consent in digital advertising environments.

When accessing internet-delivered content, viewers are presented with a consent notification that explains how data may be used to support advertising, measurement, and service functionality. Users are able to give, withhold, or manage consent preferences before personalised advertising is delivered. This consent-based approach is comparable to cookie consent mechanisms used on websites.

The implementation of TCF 2.2 enables MBC to integrate with programmatic advertising partners while adhering to applicable data protection and privacy requirements across connected TV and hybrid broadcast platforms.

== History ==
The service adopted its current portal-based format on 21 July 2024, expanding from a single-channel offering into a multi-channel television service delivered via an HbbTV application. At launch, the available channels included MovieSphere by Lionsgate, Wicked Tuna, Rookie Blue and Music Legends. Later additions included, Lifetime Movies, Dog the Bounty Hunter and Ice Road Truckers.

In April 2026, the service underwent a realignment, during which Music Legends was removed and Wicked Tuna, Dog the Bounty Hunter and Ice Road Truckers were transferred to sister Channel, Trailblazer. At the same time, new channels were introduced including Mr. Bean and 8 Out of 10 Cats, both distributed by Banijay.

MBC launched on the Freeview platform on channel 272 before moving to channel 259 in August 2024.
