= VuTV =

British IPTV pay TV service

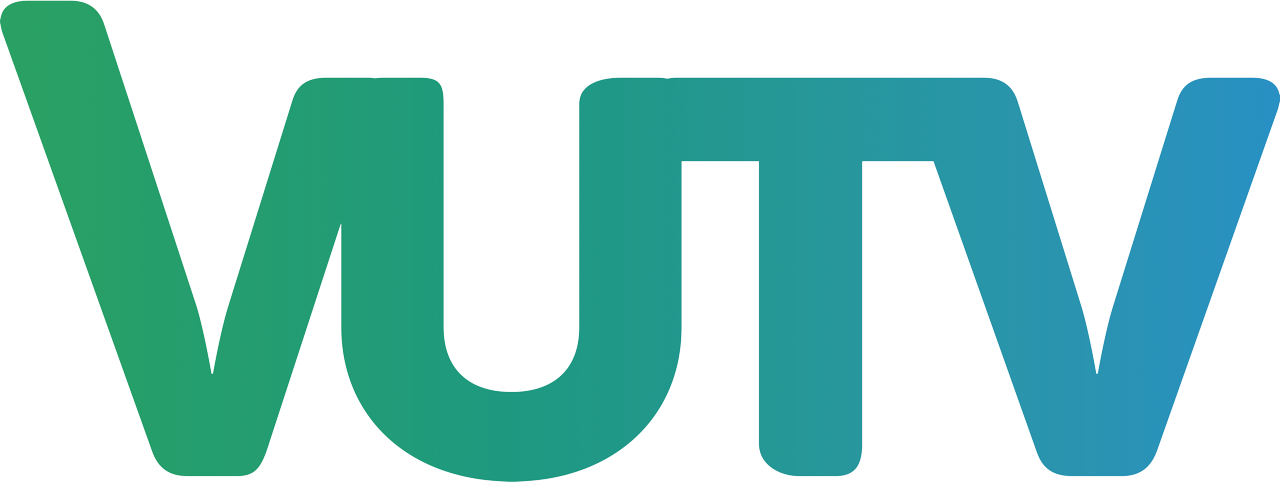
- Type: Pay TV
- Country: UK
- First air date: November 28, 2013 (12 years ago)
- Availability: Terrestrial
- Headquarters: London, UK
- Broadcast area: UK
- Owner: VuTV Limited, which is wholly owned by Strategy & Technology Limited
- Launch date: November 28, 2013; 11 years ago
- Dissolved: October 22, 2015 (10 years ago)
- Official website: vutv.com

VuTV was an IPTV Pay TV service available via "Channel 238", with Subscription TV channels available to subscribers with a broadband connected Freeview box. It was first demonstrated at the International Broadcasting Convention in September 2013 and was launched on 28 November 2013. The service closed after almost two years on 22 October 2015.

== Available channels ==
The following channels were available (in the same order as listed within the VuTV service)

- Lifetime
- Comedy Central
- MTV
- CNN International
- History
- H2
- Crime & Investigation Network
- Cartoon Network
- Boomerang
- Nickelodeon
- Nicktoons
- Nick Jr.
- Cartoonito

== Technical ==
VuTV utilised the MHEG-5 international standard for interactive television services as specified in the D-Book published by the Digital TV Group. Specifically, it relied on the MHEG Interaction Channel (MHEG-IC) for the delivery of applications, data and video content via IP. The video streams were encoded using H.264/MPEG-4 AVC, audio was encoded using Advanced Audio Coding and these were delivered encapsulated in an MPEG transport stream. Given the premium nature of the content, all channels were encrypted.
