= Rosalie Mae Jones =

Native American dancer, educator and choreographer

Daystar Rosalie Mae Jones
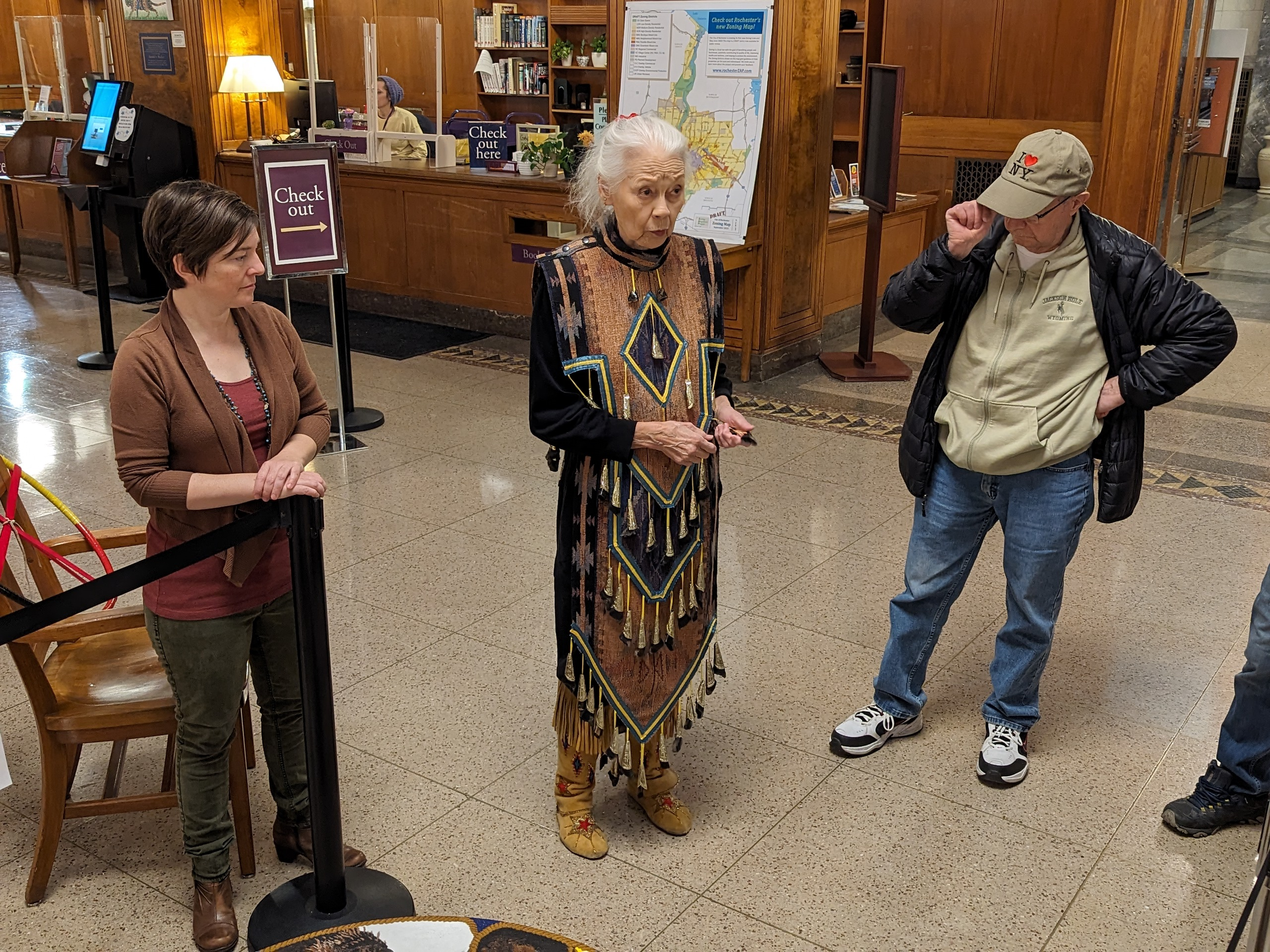
- Jones at a National American Indian Heritage Month event in Rochester, New York in 2023
- Born: Rosalie Mae Jones; 1941 (age 83–84)
- Occupations: choreographer, dancer, educator
- Years active: 1966–present
- Partner: Ned Bobkoff
- Career
- Current group: DAYSTAR:Contemporary Dance-Drama of Indian America
- Website: http://daystardance.com/home.html

Rosalie Mae Jones, known professionally as Daystar, is a dancer, choreographer, educator and founder and artistic director of DAYSTAR: Contemporary Dance-Drama of Indian America.

== Early life and education ==
Rosalie Mae (in some sources May) Jones was born on the Blackfeet Reservation in Montana in 1941. She was raised off the reserve in the town of Cut Bank, studied ballet and piano as a child, and was encouraged by her parents to pursue higher education. She attended Fort Wright College, where she studied piano, and a class in Modern Dance led by Hanya Holm, which changed the course of her studies. She would later complete a master's degree in dance from the University of Utah. While at Utah, she studied under Joan Woodbury and Shirley Ririe, and met her life-long mentor, Barry Lynn. In 1969, she attended Juilliard under a scholarship for young Native American artists and studied under José Limón, Bertram Ross, Alfredo Corvino, and Reid Gilbert.

== Career ==
While studying for her master's degree at the University of Utah, Jones was hired by the Institute of American Indian Arts to produce what would become "Sipapu: A Drama of Authentic Dance and Chants of Indian America" which featured thirty Modern dancers and two hundred traditional dancers from the Institute of American Indian Arts in Santa Fe, New Mexico. Later, at Juilliard, her studies involved working with fellow student Cordell Morsette and members of the Flandreau Indian High School in South Dakota to produce "The Gift of the Pipe" a re-telling of the story of White Buffalo Calf Woman. Jones founded the dance company Daystar: Contemporary Dance-Drama of Indian America in 1982. The company distinguished itself by developing modern dance performances featuring Native American stories and oral histories. Its stated mission is to encourage and train Native American talent in the performing arts, and to teach others to approach respectfully, the dance, music, and art of Native Americans." It was the first United States Modern dance company created with all-native performers. Jones considers choreographer Barry Lynn as one of her life-long mentors, and has also collaborated extensively with her partner Ned Bobkoff. In the early 1990s, she chaired the Institute of American Indian Arts Department of Performing Arts in Santa Fe. From 2005 to 2017 she taught in the Indigenous Studies program at Trent University in the area of Indigenous performance.

Jones' style has been described as encompassing multiple styles that, while restaging Indigenous stories, also seeks to reclaim identities on a foundation of traditional culture while demonstrating a mastery of Western stage dance techniques.

== Family ==
Jones was born on the Blackfoot Reservation in Montana. Her mother was Pembina Chippewa/Blackfeet who worked as a hotel maid and her father was a Welsh-Canadian railroad worker and welder. Her great-grandmother was Susan Big Knife, who inspired her work "No Home But the Heart."

== Works ==
- Sipapu, a Panoramic Drama of Myths, Dances and Chants (1966)
- Blackfeet medicine lodge ceremony: ritual and dance-drama (M.A. thesis, 1968)
- The Gift of the Pipe (1969) with Cordell Morsette
- Daystar: An American Indian Woman Dances
- Tales of Old Man
- La Malinche: The Woman with Three Names
- Dancing the Four Directions
- The Dispossessed (1975)
- Spirit Woman (1979)
- Between the Earth and the Moon: Voices from the Great Circle (2005)
- Allegory of the Cranes (Tsimakitakkitapohpa...Where are You Going?): a dance-drama (2011)
- jiibayaabooz: Light In The Underworld (2014) with Coman Poon and Heryka Miranda
- Dancing the Four Directions (2017)
- No Home but the Heart (2018)

== Awards ==
- National Endowment for the Arts Choreographer's Fellowship, 1995–1997
- Lifetime Achievement Award (Performing Arts), Institute of American Indian Arts 2016
