= Timeline of cable television in the United Kingdom =

This is a timeline of cable television in the United Kingdom.

The first part of the timeline covers the development of cable across the country, including details of the cable-exclusive channels which launched in the 1990s as part of cable television's attempt to compete with BSkyB's satellite television.

The merger of NTL and Telewest effectively resulted in a single national network, covering just over half the country. The second part of the timeline covers Virgin Media.

== Pre-Virgin Media ==
- 1928
  - The foundations for cable television are laid in Swindon when a company called Radio Relay starts transmitting two audio channels on a wire that runs around the town to a relatively small number of homes.
- 1936
  - Rediffusion, a supplier of cable radio services since 1928, starts providing "Pipe TV" to customers, to coincide with the BBC's launch of the world's first regular high-definition television service.
- 1950
  - A cable network is launched in Gloucester, to provide better television reception than is possible at the time via a rooftop aerial. Further such systems were built in other cities over the next three decades and by the late 1970s, 2.5 million British homes received their television service via cable.
- 1961
  - A new cable network launches in Swindon to transmit television signals. As reception in the area is poor, take-up is high and by the end of the decade around 15,000 homes were paying to receive their pictures via cable television. However, only those channels available in the area are allowed to be carried on the system.
- 1964
  - The company which provides the cable relay service in Swindon is acquired by Radio Rentals and is called Radio Rentals Cable.
- 1968
  - Thorn Electrical Industries purchases Radio Rentals.
- 1969
  - 15,000 people in Swindon are paying to receive their television pictures via cable television. However, because only existing terrestrial programmes could be put on the cable, and in consequence, the interest in cable started to decline as more and more BBC and ITV transmitters made reception clearer.
- 1972
  - The UK's Minister for Posts and Telecommunications authorises five experimental community cable television channels. The first to launch is Greenwich Cablevision.
- 1973
  - Sheffield Cablevision, The Bristol Channel and Swindon Viewpoint launch.
- 1974
  - March – The final community station, Wellingborough Cablevision, launches.
- 1975
  - 14 March – After less than two years on air, The Bristol Channel closes.
  - 24 March – Wellingborough Cablevision closes.
- 1976
  - 2 January – Sheffield Cablevision closes when the funds run out.
  - Greenwich Cablevision closes as a full-time service although programming made by volunteers keeps the station on air in a restricted form until the early 1980s.
  - Swindon Viewpoint’s experimental phase ends when EMI decided to pull out of funding the service. However, the channel continues after it was sold to the public of Swindon for £1.
- 1980
  - April – Regular programming on Swindon Viewpoint ends when funding dries up. but continues intermittently for the next decade with programmes made by volunteers.
- 1981
  - Radio Rental Cable Television launches the UK's first pay-per-view movie channel, 'Cinematel', for cable viewers in Swindon. The channel later expands to Chatham in Kent. As well as showing movies, the channel also broadcasts some local programming, including one-off documentaries and shortly after a live news-magazine format programme, called Scene in Swindon launches. Also provided is a local teletext service, with pages about film information, horoscopes, recipes, local bus times and job vacancies.
  - 9 September – Rediffusion launches a movie channel called Starview. It is allowed to launch the channel following a decision by the Home Office granting several experimental licences to broadcast subscription television and Rediffusion had won one of these licenses.
- 1982
  - Proposals to liberalise cable television in the UK are drawn up. Previously, apart from the 1981 experiments, the cable networks were only allowed to relay the over-the-air channels.
- 1983
  - Ahead of the enacting of the forthcoming liberalisation, the Government licenses eleven interim franchises for broadband systems. Each covers an individual town or city of around 100,000 homes.
- 1984
  - 16 January – Satellite Television Ltd launches in the UK on Swindon Cable as Sky Channel. The channel initially broadcasts for five hours each night and as more operators start to carry the channel, its broadcast hours slowly expand.
  - 29 March –
    - Thorn EMI, which operates Swindon Cable, launches three channels – movie channel The Entertainment Network, music channel Music Box and sport channel Screensport. Despite being delivered by satellite, they are created with the planned roll-out of cable across the UK in mind.
    - Starview closes when the final areas that took the channel replace it by one of the new Thorn EMI channels, The Entertainment Network.
  - The Cable and Broadcasting Act 1984 is enacted. This allows cable companies to offer as many channels as they liked, and also allowed cable companies to offer a telephone service in competition with British Telecom.
  - 1 December – The Cable Authority comes into existence and on 1 January 1985 takes on the functions granted to it by the Cable and Broadcasting Act 1984, paving the way for fully commercial cable franchises to be awarded on a city-by-city basis.
- 1985
  - 1 September – Ealing Cable launches Home Video Channel, which shows low-budget movies devoted to horror, action/adventure, science fiction and erotica, and is subsequently rolled out to other cable operators by sending tapes and a copy of the programme schedule so that could be played out locally.
  - 18 December – Full launch of Westminster Cable's service.
  - 20 December – United Artists Programming launches Bravo. It shows mainly black & white B-movies from the 1950s and 1960s. The channel remains a cable-exclusive service until it launches on satellite in July 1993.
  - Swindon's cable service is re-branded as Swindon Cable and its news programme is renamed as part of this move and became Focus on Swindon. The channel increases the programme's frequency from twice a week to three times a week.
- 1986
  - 4 February – Thorn EMI sells its stake in Swindon Cable to British Telecom and the new owners axe Focus on Swindon and other local programming and replaces it with bought-in content.
  - May – Ealing Cable launches Indra Dhnush, a subscription-based Asian service devoted to Hindi films and television programmes with some material in other Indian languages. Its distribution method is the same as its sister channel HVC.
  - August – Star Channel launches as an alternative film service which broadcasts between 6.30pm and 2.00am, it has been distributed to several cable operators on videotape form rather than by satellite.
- 1987
  - March – Ealing Cable sells HVC to Premiere. The new owner continues with the channel's existing operational model including the distribution of tapes, and increases its broadcasting hours.
  - July – The loss for expected closure of Star Channel following its merger with Premiere to reduce the remaining film services include Bravo and Home Video Channel.
- 1988
  - United Cable of Denver purchases Croydon Cable and subsequently merges with United Artists Cable International.
  - Swindon cable's TV channel is relaunched as Swindon's Local Channel. This sees the return to the service of local news, sport and one-off documentaries.
- 1989
  - 5 February – Satellite television service Sky Television launches. The new channels – Sky News, Sky Movies and Eurosport – are carried on cable.
- 1990
  - 25 March – British Satellite Broadcasting (BSB) launches its five-channel service and for the first five weeks, the channels are only available on cable. In November BSB and Sky TV merge and a month later two of the five BSB channels – Galaxy and Now – are closed down.
  - In its final annual report, published at its demise, the Cable Authority stated that by the end of 1990, even though almost 15 million homes had been included in franchised areas, only 828,000 of these had been passed by broadband cable and only 149,000 were subscribing.
- 1991
  - 1 January – The Independent Television Commission takes over the licensing and regulation of cable from The Cable Authority.
  - 8 June – United Artists merges with its largest shareholder Tele-Communications Inc. (TCI).
  - United Artists Programming initiates a trial project to provide coverage of Yesterday in the Commons to cable networks across the UK.
- 1992
  - The major cable companies join to form 'Cable Programme Partners One (CPP1)', to try to provide alternative content to the satellite-dominated multi-channel environment of the time.
  - 13 January – Following on from the success of Yesterday in the Commons, United Artists Cable launches a full time channel providing live and recorded coverage of the British Parliament called The Parliamentary Channel.
  - 25 April – On-demand music video channel The Box launches. Initially launched in four cable areas, it slowly rolls out on a regional basis across the entire cable network before getting its first on satellite in 1998.
  - October – Country music channel CMT Europe launches on cable. The following year it starts part-time broadcasts on Astra and it doesn't get a full-time service on satellite until later in the 1990s.
  - December - The Performance Channel launches in the UK. It broadcasts arts programming each night from 7pm until the early hours. It remains a cable-exclusive channel until 2003 and ended broadcasting in July 2008.
  - Following the merger of TCI and United Artists, they launch a joint venture called Telewest Communications.
- 1993
  - 4 May – Wire TV launches. Branding itself as 'The Cable Channel', this is the flagship channel of CPP1. Wire TV broadcasts a mix of entertainment, lifestyle and sport from 1pm until 11pm and includes two hours each day of regional programming.
  - Barclay Knapp and George Blumenthal, the founders of the cellular network company Cellular Communications, Inc., establish International CableTel.
- 1994
  - 3 January – TCI acquires a 60.4% stake in Flextech and Flextech acquires 100% of Bravo, 25% of UK Gold, 31% of UK Living, and 25% of The Children's Channel.
  - February – Travel launches exclusively on cable, broadcasting daily between midday and midnight.
  - 2 March – Wire TV’s backers outbid BSkyB to the rights for the 1996 Cricket World Cup as part of a plan to set up a sports channel to take on Sky Sports. Wire TV's evening programming is by now devoted to sport under the name Sportswire with the daytime entertainment programming called LiveWire.
  - 30 November – Associated Newspapers launches Channel One, a network of city news channels. The first to launch is in London.
  - AsiaVision, previously Indra Dhnush, closes due to accumulated debts.
- 1995
  - 16 January – Mirror Group plc launches Mirror Television by purchasing Wire TV. It plans to launch Sportswire as a full-time channel and replace Wire TV with a new channel called L!VE TV.
  - May – TCI (owners of Telewest) and NYNEX, two of the main players of CPP1, do a deal with BSkyB which includes a clause that the cable operators do not launch any rival channels to those already operated by Sky. This marks the end of CPP1 and causes the collapse of sports channel Sportswire, days before it was due to launch.
  - 31 May – Wire TV closes.
  - 1 June – SelecTV launches. It is a general entertainment channel which broadcasts each weeknight from 5pm until midnight, with a midday start at the weekend.
  - 12 June – L!VE TV launches as Mirror Television's sole television channel.
  - June – Telewest merges with SBC Communications, adding franchises in the Midlands and North West serving 1.3 million homes.
  - 3 July – Bell Cablemedia is formed when a number of cable companies, including Jones Cable UK, merge.
  - 1 October – The Sci Fi Channel launches in the UK but its full-time hours (8am to 4am) are only broadcast on cable due to a lack of space on satellite. It broadcasts on satellite for only three hours each evening, and satellite viewers have to wait until the launch of Sky Digital in 1998 to see the channel's full-time output.
- 1996
  - 1 February – Channel One launches in Bristol and Bath. 1996 also sees a Liverpool-based channel start broadcasting.
  - A number of cable companies drop CMT Europe. This dents its reach and the channel closes 18 months later.
  - 1 September – The Weather Network and The Weather Channel launch on various cable networks. They use the regional nature of cable to provide regional weather forecasts. However both channels are gone within two years due to low viewership.
  - 2 September – Carlton Food Network launches. It broadcasts on weekday afternoons and shares space with SelecTV.
  - 23 October – NYNEX, Vidéotron and Bell Cablemedia merge Cable & Wireless subsidiary, Mercury Communications. The new company is called Cable & Wireless Communications.
- 1997
  - 14 February – SelecTV is rebranded Carlton Select following Carlton Television’s purchase of Pearson Television.
  - 9 November – As part of its foray into digital television, the BBC launches BBC News 24. However, the channel launches almost a year prior to the launch of digital television in the UK and is only available 24 hours a day on cable, with all other viewers only able to watch the channel overnight on BBC One.
  - Front Row is created to provide a near on-demand pay-per-view movies service for cable television. However, Cable & Wireless chooses not to carry the service, instead opting for Sky Box Office.
- 1998
  - March – Telewest and General Cable merge.
  - Telewest also acquires the outstanding interest in Birmingham Cable, adding a further 1.7 million franchise homes in Yorkshire, west London and Birmingham.
  - 19 May – CableTel adopts NTL as its new name.
  - 23 September – The BBC purchases The Parliamentary Channel and relaunches it as BBC Parliament.
  - 25 September – Channel One closes its London and Bristol/Vath stations, but its Liverpool station remains on air.
  - 1 October – Sky Digital launches, becoming the UK's first digital television service. Consequently, a number of channels which had only been available full-time on cable are now able to broadcast their full schedule on satellite.
  - 15 November – Rival digital television service ONdigital launches. Two of the channels – Carlton Food Network and Carlton Select – had been available exclusively on cable since the mid-1990s.
- 1999
  - NTL buys Cambridge Cable, which over its 11-year history had expanded to cover all of Cambridgeshire and Essex.
  - 1 May – After 14 years on air, HVC closes.
  - 26 August – Telewest purchases the remaining 50% stake in Cable London from NTL, adding 400,000 franchise homes in North London.
  - 5 November – LIVE TV closes.
  - Towards the end of 1999, Cable & Wireless Communications launches its digital television service.
  - Following its launch on satellite, The Box closes its regional versions in favour of a single national channel.
- 2000
  - 1 March – Following the closure of Carlton Select, Carlton Cinema launches in its place on cable. Carlton Select had shared space on cable with Carlton Food Network and this arrangement continues meaning that on cable, Carlton Cinema is only available during the evening and overnight.
  - 19 April – Telewest and Flextech merge.
  - 17 May – The completion of NTL's purchase of Cable & Wireless’ cable assets takes place two months after the sale was cleared by the Competition Commission.
  - 1 August – The ITN News Channel launches. It is a joint venture between ITN and NTL, which owns 35% of the channel.
  - 2 November – Telewest acquires Eurobell, taking the total number of homes passed to 4.9 million.
  - Telewest and NTL launch their digital television services.
  - After 16 years on air, Swindon's Local Channel closes.
- 2001
  - January – Cable television comes to the Isle of Wight when operator Isle of Wight Cable and Telephone Company launches. The island remains the only part of the UK's cable network not to be owned by Virgin Media.
  - 1 February – NTL launches movie channel The Studio in conjunction with Vivendi Universal.
- 2002
  - May – Less than a year after being founded and less than six months after launching, Omne Communications enters administration.
  - June – Carlton Television and Granada Television purchase ITN's 65% stake in the ITN News Channel and on 30 September it is renamed as the ITV News Channel. NTL retains its 35% stake.
  - Following the purchase of Isle of Wight Cable and Telephone Company by CLS Holdings, the service is renamed WightCable.
  - 30 October – At 12noon, Channel One Liverpool closes.
- 2003
  - 1 January – The Studio closes.
  - 1 February – CLS Holdings, owners of WightCable, acquires a 76% stake in Omne Communications for £4.1 million, saving it from closure and later in 2003, Omne is rebranded WightCable North.
  - 29 December – Ofcom replaces the Independent Television Commission as the UK's television regulator.
- 2004
  - April – The newly created ITV plc purchases NTL's 35% stake in the ITV News Channel.
- 2005
  - 18 January – Both NTL and Telewest start rolling out video-on-demand services.
  - CLS Holdings sells the assets of Wightcable to private investors in 2005, who formed WightCable (2005) Ltd and in 2012 WightCable was rebranded as WightFibre.
  - 1 December – Telewest launches its first personal video recorder TV Drive.
- 2006
  - At the start of 2006, Telewest becomes the first company in the UK to launch a high-definition service. It provides between 10 and 30 hours of on-demand content in HD, and that summer it provides HD access to some 2006 FIFA World Cup matches to customers who have the TV Drive box.
  - January – CLS Holdings sells WightCable North, at a loss of £2.1 million, to Netfonics Just over a year later WightCable North is rebranded as Smallworld Media, then to Smallworld Cable (2009) and to Smallworld Fibre in 2013.
  - March – NTL and Telewest merge.
- 2017
  - 31 March – Wrights Radio Relay, the last CATV system in the UK which still carried analogue as well as DVB, closes down after 57 years of operation in Newtown, Mid Wales.

== Virgin Media ==
- 2006
  - 8 November – Virgin Media comes into being when NTL and Telewest does a deal to license the Virgin name.
- 2007
  - 8 February – The Virgin Media brand is launched.
  - 20 February – Virgin launches its new on-demand channel Virgin Central.
  - 1 March – The Sky Basics channels stop broadcasting on Virgin Media when the two companies cannot agree a new carriage deal.
  - 1 June – In a bid to increase take-up of its V+ personal video recorder, XL TV customers are given the V+ box free as part of their package.
  - 26 July – Virgin Media and Setanta Sports sign a deal to allow VM's XL customers free access to Setanta Sports.
  - 1 October – Virgin1 is launched amid the continued stand-off between Virgin Media and BSkyB. The channel is intended as a replacement for Sky One.
  - 29 November – Setanta Sports News launches. For Virgin Media customers this is a direct replacement for Sky Sports News.
- 2008
  - 30 April – The BBC iPlayer becomes available for the first time on Virgin Media.
  - May – Virgin Media begins its "long term" region-by-region analogue television service switch off project, beginning with Coventry and Glasgow.
  - 13 November – The Sky Basics channels return to Virgin Media.
- 2009
  - 23 June – Setanta Sports stops broadcasting.
  - 3 August –
    - ESPN launches its UK television sports channel and is made available to all of Virgin's XL TV customers.
    - More than three years after its launch on Sky Digital, ESPN Classic begins broadcasting on Virgin Media.
  - 24 November – Virgin Media enters into a strategic partnership with TiVo. Under the mutually exclusive agreement, TiVo will develop a converged television and broadband interactive interface to power Virgin Media's next generation, high definition set top boxes. Virgin Media will be the exclusive distributor of TiVo services and technology in the United Kingdom.
- 2010
  - 1 March – Virgin Media switches off analogue cable service in Manchester.
  - 4 June – British Sky Broadcasting and Virgin Media announce that they have reached an agreement for the acquisition by Sky of Virgin Media Television. The take-over is completed on 13 July.
  - 20 July – Film4 HD launches exclusively on Virgin Media and remains exclusive to the platform until it launches on Sky in 2013.
  - 3 September – Virgin 1 is rebranded as Channel One because the Virgin name was not licensed to Sky.
  - December – Virgin Media releases its first TiVo co-branded product.
- 2011
  - 1 February – Sky Atlantic launches. However the channel does not launch on Virgin Media and to this day it is still not available on the cable platform.
  - Early 2011 – Video on demand content from ESPN Classic starts to appear on the Virgin Media platform.
  - May – Virgin Media carries Eurosport's 3D coverage of the French Open tennis tournament.
  - July – BSkyB’s on demand service Sky Anytime becomes available on Virgin Media.
  - 15 August – Virgin Media agrees to sell its 50% stake in UKTV to Scripps Networks for £339m.
  - 19 December – Virgin Media signs a deal with BBC Sport allowing the cable company to provide extra coverage of sports events, including live video streams of the 2012 Olympic Games.
- 2012
  - January – Virgin Media shuts down its analogue service in Westminster. Due to a dispute with BT, which owns the cables, Virgin was not able to obtain the access required to launch its digital service in the area.
  - February – The V+ box stops being available to new customers as it starts to be phased out in favour of TiVo boxes.
  - 8 February – For the first time, a UK cable company moves into profit when Virgin Media announces a small profit for 2011.
  - 13 September – Movies-on-demand service FilmFlex is renamed Virgin Movies.
- 2013
  - 6 February – Virgin Media is bought by Liberty Global at a cost of £15 billion.
  - 15 August – BT Sport starts broadcasting on Virgin Media, a month after the channel's launch. Virgin makes the channel available in its XL package as had been the case with Setanta Sports and with ESPN.
  - 25 October – Four years after launching, Premier Sports finally becomes available on Virgin Media. It launches one day prior to the start of the 2013 Rugby League World Cup and is available to all viewers until early 2014.
  - 28 November – Virgin Media shuts down its analogue service in Milton Keynes. As was the case in Westminster, BT and Virgin Media were not able to reach an agreement allowing Virgin the physical access needed to launch its digital service.
- 2014
  - 3 February – Virgin Media acquires Smallworld Fibre.
  - 12 May – Virgin Media signs a new five-year agreement with Sky but the deal does not include Sky Atlantic.
- 2015
  - 5 January – The HD versions of Sky News and Sky Sports News HQ launch on Virgin Media.
- 2016
  - 12 January –
    - Virgin Media launches four music channels but they are only available as an app to TiVo customers by pressing the red button on channel 345. This is the first time that Virgin Media has launched channels in this way. Later in 2016, one of the channels – Clubland TV – launches as a linear channel meaning that it can be viewed by non-Tivo customers with the other channels accessible by pressing red.
    - Virgin Media adds the Vevo streaming music service, again only for Tivo customers.
  - 24 August – Sky Sports Mix launches and is available from day one on Virgin Media. Also launching on the platform at around the same time are a number of channels already available on Freeview, including Spike, truTV and Movie Mix.
  - November – Virgin Media launches a new set top box, the TiVo-powered Virgin V6 Box. It is only available to customers who also take Virgin Media's internet service.
- 2017
  - 10 April – Virgin TV Kids launches, replacing Tiddlers TV.
  - 1 June – Talking Pictures TV appears on Virgin Media, two years after it launched on other platforms.
  - 18 July – Sky Sports is revamped. The numbered services are dropped in favour of dedicated channels devoted to their core sports properties with all other sports moved to two new channels – Action and Arena. Sky allows customers to subscribe to specific channels but Virgin Media customers have to take all the channels or none at all.
- 2018
  - 8 February – Virgin Media signs its first deal with a US streaming service when it announces a partnership with Amazon to co-fund a sci-fi series The Feed.
  - 21 July – A number of channels start broadcasting on Virgin Media. These include FreeSports, Paramount Network, YourTV, Vice and Horse & Country TV which had all been available on other platforms for some time, and Now 80s, which had previously been available via the red button on Clubland TV, launches as a linear channel. Also, two channels from Canadian company Blue Ant Media – Love Nature and children's channel ZooMoo – launch. Both are exclusive to Virgin Media in the UK.
  - 22 July – The UKTV channels stop broadcasting on Virgin Media. The dispute receives considerable media attention.
  - 27 July – Virgin Media agrees a new three-year deal with ITV after more than a year of discussions.
  - 30 July – BT Sport’s 4K HD channel launches on Virgin Media.
  - 11 August – The UKTV channels return to Virgin Media. The long term deal sees the HD versions of Dave and Gold launch on Virgin Media.
  - 17 September – Virgin Media launches a linear UHD channel, becoming Virgin's first linear television channel since it sold its channels to Sky in 2010. It broadcasts a mix of drama, documentaries and music to customers who have its premium V6 set-top box.
  - 25 September – For the first time, Virgin Media removes standard definition (SD) channels when Gold's SD channel is removed from the platform.
  - 4 December – Virgin Media removes the SD versions of BT Sport.
  - 11 December – BBC Two in SD is replaced on channel 102 by the high definition version although BBC Two continues to be available in SD as BBC Two England on channel 862.
- 2019
  - Virgin Media stops broadcasting many more channels in standard definition, including BBC Four, BBC News, CBBC and CBeebies (SD channels removed on 19 February), Lifetime, History, H2 and Crime & Investigation (removed on 14 May), the Sky Cinema channels (apart from Sky Movies Premier +1, removed on 1 August), Eurosport and Discovery (removed on 26 September).
  - March – Now 90s, which had previously only been available via the red button on Clubland TV and Now 80s, launches on Virgin Media EPG. Sister channel Total Country also launches on the same day.
  - 18 July – Virgin Media signs what it describes as an "extended deal" with Sky but once again, Sky Atlantic is not included. However the deal will see Sky's UHD content launching on Virgin Media in 2020.
- 2020
  - 7 January – Almost a decade after it was removed, MTV Classic re-appears on Virgin Media. It relaunches on the platform following the closure of VH1.
- 2021
  - 25 February – The UHD content from Sky announced in 2019 appears following the launch on Virgin Media of Sky Entertainment and Sky Cinema Ultra HD.
  - 29 July – Virgin Media announces that it will upgrade its fixed network to full fibre to the premises (FTTP) by 2028.
  - 1 September – CNN International is removed from Virgin Media - the reason given is "Warner Media’s plans to move [the channel] to a subscription model."
- 2022
  - 26 January – Virgin Media removes all of the remaining standard definition versions of BBC channels, although BBC Parliament in SD isn't removed until 12 April.
  - 27 September – Channel 4 HD moves to position 104 when it axes the standard definition version of the channel.
- 2023
  - 24 January – Virgin Media instigates its biggest cull of standard definition channels so far when it removes standard definition channels from, among others, ITV, Channel 5 and the majority of the Sky channels.
  - 4 July – Virgin Media makes its biggest ever set of changes to its EPG with more than 80 channel moves. The changes see the +1 channels grouped together lower down the EPG, along with a merger of the entertainment, lifestyle and documentary channels.
  - 1 August – Virgin Media becomes the first UK television provider to launch FAST channels on its EPG. However, these channels are only available to customers who have Virgin Media's newest set-top boxes.
- 2024
  - 10 September – Three years after it was removed, CNN International returns to Virgin Media.
- 2025
  - No events.
- 2026
  - 1 April – More than 15 years after its launch, Sky Atlantic appears on some Virgin Media O2 set-top boxes.
  - 1 November – Virgin Media is to close its digital movie and TV purchasing service Virgin Media Store and will handed over provision for such a service to Rakuten TV. Ahead of the changes Virgin added three Rakuten FAST changes - TV Drama, TV Comedy and TV Sci-fi.
