= Timeline of local television in the UK =

This is a timeline of local television in the United Kingdom. This refers to stations transmitting to a small area such as a city or part of a county, and not to larger regions covered by ITV and BBC regions.

== 1970s ==
- 1972
  - The UK's Minister for Posts and Telecommunications authorises five experimental community cable television channels. The first to launch is Greenwich Cablevision.
- 1973
  - Sheffield Cablevision, The Bristol Channel and Swindon Viewpoint launch.
- 1974
  - March – The final community station, Wellingborough Cablevision, launches.
- 1975
  - 14 March – After less than two years on air, The Bristol Channel closes.
  - 24 March – Wellingborough Cablevision closes.
- 1976
  - 2 January – Sheffield Cablevision closes when the funds run out.
  - Greenwich Cablevision closes as a full time service although programming made by volunteers keeps the station on air in a restricted form until the early 1980s.
  - Swindon Viewpoint’s experimental phase ends when EMI decided to pull out of funding the service. However, the channel continues after it was sold to the public of Swindon for £1.
- 1977
  - No events.
- 1978
  - No events.
- 1979
  - No events.

== 1980s ==
- 1980
  - April – Regular programming on Swindon Viewpoint ends when funding dries up. but continues intermittently for the next decade with programmes made by volunteers.
- 1981
  - Radio Rental Cable Television launches the UK's first pay-per-view movie channel, 'Cinematel', for cable viewers in Swindon. As well as showing movies, the channel also broadcasts some local programming, including one-off documentaries and shortly after a live news-magazine format programme, called Scene in Swindon launches. Also provided is a local teletext service, with pages about film information, horoscopes, recipes, local bus times and job vacancies.
- 1982
  - No events.
- 1983
  - No events.
- 1984
  - No events.
- 1985
  - Swindon's cable service is rebranded as Swindon Cable and its news programme is renamed as part of this move and becomes Focus on Swindon. The channel increases the programme's frequency from twice a week to three times a week.
- 1986
  - 4 February – Thorn EMI sells its stake in Swindon Cable to British Telecom and the new owners axe Focus on Swindon and other local programming and replaces it with bought-in content.
- 1987
  - No events.
- 1988
  - Swindon Cable's TV channel is relaunched as Swindon's Local Channel. This sees the return to the service of local news, sport and one-off documentaries.
- 1989
  - No events.

== 1990s ==
- 1990
  - No events.
- 1991
  - No events.
- 1992
  - No events.
- 1993
  - No events.
- 1994
  - 30 November – Associated Newspapers launches a rolling news service for London called Channel One. It is only available on cable and only in some areas.
- 1995
  - L!VE TV launches the first of its local television channels. Out of a planned network of around 20 channels, only a few make it to air.
- 1996
  - 1 February – Channel One launches in Bristol and Bath. Also in 1996, a channel covering Liverpool launches.
- 1997
  - No events.
- 1998
  - 4 September – Channel One announces the closure of its channels in London and Bristol and the sale of its sole operation in Liverpool.
  - 25 September – After less than four years on air, the two Channel One channels close.
- 1999
  - 27 May – MATV Channel 6 begins broadcasting to the Asian community in Leicester on UHF Channel 68 (frequency 847.25 MHz - Horizontally polarised) from 27 May 1999 until late 2009.
  - 6 June – The Oxford Channel begins broadcasting.
  - 17 October – C9TV (Channel 9 Television) launches as a local television station channel in Derry.
  - 5 November – L!VE TV closes and so do its local channels.

== 2000s ==
- 2000
  - 14 February – Channel M begins broadcasting as a RSL station, available free-to-air on terrestrial in parts of Greater Manchester.
- 2001
  - May – Channel Six Dundee starts broadcasting.
  - The Oxford Channel is sold to Milestone Group and is relaunched as Six TV.
- 2002
  - July – Channel Six Dundee stops broadcasting.
  - 30 October – Channel One Liverpool shuts down.
  - 31 October – Solent TV starts broadcasting to the Isle of Wight.
- 2003
  - No events,
- 2004
  - 9 February – Belfast local channel NVTV starts broadcasting.
- 2005
  - No events.
- 2006
  - No events.
- 2007
  - C9TV stops all new programme production with much of the station's transmission time now consisting of simulcasts of Sky News.
  - 16 April – Channel M launches a breakfast show Channel M Breakfast.
  - 24 May – Solent TV stops broadcasting.
- 2008
  - No events.
- 2009
  - C9TV stops broadcasting after ten years on air.
  - April – Six TV stops broadcasting after a decade of broadcasting to the Oxford area.
  - 27 April – Channel M's then-chief executive Mark Dodson announces that the station was looking to make 41 redundancies from its 74 staff and restrict weekday live programming from four programmes (totalling six hours of output, including a breakfast show Channel M Breakfast) to one three-hour news magazine programme, broadcast between 4pm and 7pm, in order to cut losses. The new live programme, Channel M Today launches on Monday 13 July 2009.

== 2010s ==
- 2010
  - March – Channel M Today ends. 29 of the station's 33 staff were made redundant. The station goes on to broadcast a mix of archived programming, original output from Salford University and simulcasts of Euronews and Real Radio North West alongside some new programming from independent and third party producers.
  - 5 October – UTV HD launches, but only on Virgin Media.
- 2011
  - No events.
- 2012
  - 16 April – Channel M closes after 12 years of broadcasting. The station's owners, GMG Radio, said UK government plans for localised television services would not allow the station to run a commercially viable service in the future. Local programming and ended several months earlier resulting in a schedule consisting of simulcasts of Real Radio North West and Euronews and acquired programming from The Community Channel.
  - 10 May – Ofcom invites bids for local TV services in 34 areas of the UK.
  - August – 57 applications were received to provide these services.
  - October – Belfast local channel NVTV stops broadcasting ahead of digital switchover but it continues to stream its programming online.
  - 23 October – At just after 11.30 pm, Digital switchover is completed in the UK when analogue television signals in Northern Ireland are switched off.
- 2013
  - 13 March – Ofcom announces that 14 more areas had been selected to invite bids for local television services, in addition to re-advertising the previously un-awarded Swansea and Plymouth locations. However many of the licenses are not awarded.
  - 26 November – Estuary TV launches on Freeview, becoming the first Local Digital Television Programme Services to launch.
- 2014
  - 24 March – Mustard TV begins broadcasting to the Norwich area.
  - 31 March – At 6.30pm, London Live begins broadcasting.
  - 27 May – Notts TV begins broadcasting.
  - 2 June – STV launches the first of its local television channels – STV Glasgow.
  - 28 August – Latest TV begins broadcasting to the Brighton area.
  - 23 September – Sheffield Live TV begins broadcasting.
  - 29 September – NVTV is relaunched following the channel being awarded a 12-year local TV licence by Ofcom.
  - 8 October – Made in Bristol begins broadcasting.
  - 15 October – Made in Cardiff begins broadcasting as Cardiff's local television channel.
  - 6 November – Made in Cardiff begins broadcasting.
  - 12 November – Made in Tyne & Wear begins broadcasting.
  - 26 November – That's Solent begins broadcasting.
  - 4 December – Bay TV Liverpool begins broadcasting on Freeview. The channel had been on air since 2011 when it had launched as a video-on-demand service.
- 2015
  - 12 January – STV launches its second local television channel STV Edinburgh.
  - 28 February – Big Centre TV begins broadcasting.
  - 19 March – STV is awarded three more local licenses, to cover Aberdeen, Ayr and Dundee.
  - 17 April – That's Oxfordshire begins broadcasting.
  - 31 May – That's Manchester begins broadcasting.
  - 18 August – That’s Cambridge begins broadcasting.
  - 24 August – That’s Lancashire begins broadcasting to the Preston and Blackpool areas of west Lancashire.
- 2016
  - Following the closure of BBC Three, the local stations move from Channel 8 to channel 7 in England and Northern Ireland, and from channel 23 to channel 8 in Scotland and Wales.
  - April – Ofcom gives London Live permission to reduce the amount of local shows that it has to broadcast at peak time to one hour per day.
  - 12 July – That's Swansea Bay begins broadcasting.
  - October – Bay TV stops broadcasting at 11pm on Sunday 9 October 2016 and reopens as Made in Liverpool at 6pm on Wednesday 19 October 2016. the change follows Bay TV entering administration six weds earlier. The station owed a total of £451,575, with a debt to Revenue and Customs outstanding at £145,187, individual shareholder loans debts to the value of £133,800, and other “trade and expense creditors” to the sum of £152,488.
  - November – Big Centre TV stops broadcasting to Birmingham at midnight on Friday 4 November 2016 and reopened and relaunched as Made in Birmingham at 6 pm on Tuesday 8 November 2016. The change takes place following Made Television, which was unsuccessful in bidding to run the franchise in 2012, purchase of Big Centre TV.
- 2017
  - 30 March – Made in Teesside begins broadcasting.
  - 19 April – Cardiff TV's flagship news bulletin Cardiff News is broadcast for the final time. The programme is replaced by a mixed bulletin of local and national news produced at Made TV's headquarters in Leeds.
  - 24 April – STV merges its local channels and relaunches them as a single channel called STV2. The change sees STV launch a primetime weeknight news programme called STV News Tonight which combined news from across all of Scotland with UK and international news. this day also sees local TV beginning in other areas of Scotland including Aberdeen, Ayr and Dundee.
  - 26 April – Local television comes to north east Wales when Made in North Wales begins broadcasting.
  - May – That's Thames Valley begins broadcasting to the Reading area of Berkshire.
  - 23 May – That’s Hampshire begins broadcasting.
  - 25 May – The Made channels begin carrying acquired programming for the first time, from the UK & Ireland version of factual entertainment channel TruTV as part of a supply agreement with Sony Pictures Television. The stations simulcast TruTV in two daily blocks from 1-5pm and from 9pm-1am.
  - 26 June – That’s York begins broadcasting.
  - 11 July – KMTV (Kent) begins broadcasting to Maidstone and Tonbridge.
  - 19 July – That’s Salisbury begins broadcasting.
  - 25 July – That’s Carlisle begins broadcasting.
  - 1 August – That’s North Yorkshire begins broadcasting to the Scarborough area.
  - 2 August – That's Surrey begins broadcasting.
  - 31 August – Mustard TV broadcasts its last show, having been sold to the That's TV group. It is replaced by That’s TV Norfolk.
  - November – Following a restructuring of Made network's operations, local programming is cut and studio production of daily news and magazine programmes is centralised at Made's Leeds and Birmingham stations. Also, the Made channels begin simulcasting CBS Reality for 11 hours a day.
  - 29 November – That's Norfolk begins broadcasting.
- 2018
  - February – Cardiff Live is launched as Made in Cardiff's sole local programme. The bulletin however is not live but it is produced locally. At around the same time, Made in Cardiff and Made in North Wales are relaunched as Cardiff TV and North Wales TV respectively.
  - 30 June – STV2 closes down and the channel's assets are sold to That's Media, owners of the That's TV network of local television stations in England. The closure results in the cancellation of STV News Tonight.
  - 19 August – Made Television is rebranded as Local Television Limited and all sub stations are renamed according to their city.
  - 15 October – That's TV Scotland launches as the replacement local television service in Aberdeen, Ayr, Dundee, Edinburgh and Glasgow.
- 2019
  - July – That's TV announces the closure of 13 of its 20 studios in order to downsize to seven regional production centres producing content for its 20 local stations.

== 2020s ==
- 2020
  - 12 November – Local news is reduced to a 10 minute slot at 6pm when That's TV is temporarily rebranded as That’s Christmas and mixes up its music programming - which earlier in 2020 had become to main focus of output - so that Christmas hits would be played alongside 'party classics' from the 70s, 80s or 90s. That's Christmas returns in subsequent years.
- 2021
  - January – Local Television Limited begins broadcasting a service targeting viewers in Manchester. Unlike the group's other channels, Manchester TV is not the official local-TV service provider and therefore Manchester TV occupies a lower berth on the EPG (LCN 99 at launch) and transmits on the legacy Greater Manchester multiplex originally set up for the defunct Channel M service.
  - 1 November – Ofcom agrees to That's TV's request to reduce the number of production bases it has in regards to its newsgathering with some local news items to be produced outside the broadcast areas the company holds the licence for. That's TV hopes to have most of its news bulletins produced in studios based in Salford (for England) or Glasgow (for Scotland), with additional offices operating in Reading, Norwich, and Swansea (with news programmes for Wales to be either produced in Salford or Glasgow in the future).
- 2022
  - No events.
- 2023
  - January – Local TV enters into a partnership with Talk TV which sees Talk TV being simulcast on Local's eight stations when they are not broadcasting locally-focussed programming. This follows a pilot the previous autumn when Local TV's channels had simulcasted TalkTV following the death of the Queen.
  - 18 October – Local TV’s eight stations are rebranded as Talk TV, followed by the individual channel's broadcast area. TalkTV now broadcasts on these channels for 15 hours each day.
- 2024
  - April – Ahead of the closure of TalkTV as a linear channel, Local TV's channels revert back to their original names, for example, TalkBirmingham reverts to Birmingham TV.
- 2025
  - January – London Live is bought by David Montgomery's Local TV Ltd. and the new owner announces that the channel will close on 19 January at 23.59.59.
  - 16 January – The final local news programme airs on London Live.
  - 20 January – London TV, a London version of the Local TV Network, which airs True Crime for most of the day, replaces London Live as London's local television station.
  - 23 April – That's TV takes over the local television licences held by Sheffield Live! in South Yorkshire and Northern Visions Television in Belfast.
  - 29 August – Notts TV closes after deciding not to seek a renewal of its licence following ongoing industry-wide funding issues. This is the first time that a Local Digital Television Programme Service channel has closed without another local service replacing it.

== See also ==
- Timeline of That's TV
