= Wire TV =

Former British cable television channel (1992–1995)

- Country: United Kingdom

Ownership
- Owner: Cable Program Partners (CPP1)

History
- Launched: 4 May 1992
- Closed: 31 May 1995

Wire TV was a British cable television channel produced by United Artists Cable and featured a range of entertainment, lifestyle and sports programming from a converted unit at The Galleries shopping centre in Bristol. Wire TV broadcast on weekdays and weekends from 1.00pm to 11.00pm with regional opt-outs from 5.00pm to 7.00pm each evening when operators could insert their own local programmes. It relied on satellite distribution to cable headends across the United Kingdom, Intelsat 601 was used and broadcast alongside both The Parliamentary Channel and The Learning Channel using the first digitally-compressed uplink service.

== History ==
=== Background ===
Branded as "The Cable Network" was originally set up and funded with £25 million by Cable Program Partners (CPP1), a consortium of British cable operators including NYNEX, US West and Comcast to bolster alternative content from the satellite-dominated multichannel environment of the time.

=== Closure ===
On 16 February 1995, Wire TV was sold to Mirror Television (a subsidiary of Mirror Group plc) and its new owner planned to split Wire TV into two separate channels – L!VE TV would replace Wire, and Sportswire which would operate as a full-time service. Wire was closed on 31 May of that year; however TCI (owners of Telewest) and NYNEX made a deal with British Sky Broadcasting, which included a clause that the cable operators would not launch any rival channels to those already operated by Sky. Consequently, Sportswire collapsed just days before its planned launch which meant that L!VE TV started as Mirror's sole television channel on 12 June 1995.

== Programming ==
The daytime schedules consisted of talk-based Afternoon Live, quiz shows such as Lingo, soap operas and comedies. Evenings included phone-ins and sports coverage, which was branded as Sportswire. Weekend schedules consisted 'best of' repeats and omnibus editions of weekday soaps, which included Richmond Hill, The Bold and the Beautiful and Santa Barbara.

Notable presenters included Kathryn Apanowicz, Nino Firetto, Georgey Spanswick and also Femi Oke, who co-hosted the weekend show Soap on the Wire with television and soap opera expert Chris Stacey. The show proved popular with students and housewives alike and towards the end of 1993 was taking over 200 calls in the four hours it was on air. Producers tried to revamp it into a daily show but Stacey had other commitments and was reduced to one appearance a week so the other experts and co-presenters such as Darren Gray, Jamie Carrington-Colby, Darren Edwards and Richard Arnold were featured more frequently throughout late 1993 and 1994 all proved less popular than Stacey.

As part of a revamp in 1994, Mike Morris and Georgey Spanswick went on the road in a bright yellow-liveried bus which was converted into an outside broadcast unit and toured the country, spending a week at a time in different cable franchise areas.

=== Sport ===
Sport was part of the programming during its time on air and 1994 saw an expansion in the amount of sport shown on the channel following a deal with Chrysalis Group, and on 2 March of that year, Wire TV's backers outbid British Sky Broadcasting for the rights to screen the 1996 Cricket World Cup in a £7.5 million deal. It was the first major national sporting event ever to be acquired for a British cable channel. Wire TV also bought the rights to screen Lennox Lewis' WBC title fights, Vauxhall Conference football and darts events featuring tournaments run by the BDO.

== See also ==
- Timeline of cable television in the United Kingdom
- List of former TV channels in the United Kingdom
- Bristol Channel
- Wellingborough Cablevision
- Sheffield Cablevision
- Greenwich Cablevision
- Swindon Viewpoint
- Swindon Cable
- Starview
