= 1973 in British television =

This is a list of British television related events from 1973.

== Events ==
=== January ===
- 4 January – The comedy series Last of the Summer Wine starts as a thirty-minute pilot on BBC1's Comedy Playhouse show. The first series run starts on 12 November and the programme runs for thirty-seven years until August 2010.
- 6 January – Sesame Street, goes to air on UTV, the first time the series is transmitted on television in Northern Ireland.
- 9 January – BBC1 first airs the sitcom Whatever Happened to the Likely Lads?, starring James Bolam and Rodney Bewes.
- 11 January – The Open University awards its first degrees.
- 20 January – Grandstand, once again, becomes an afternoon-long programme. For the previous three months the programme had ended at approximately 3.50pm.
- 21 January – BBC1 shows the UK television premiere of the 1942 romantic war film Casablanca, starring Humphrey Bogart and Ingrid Bergman.

=== February ===
- 5 February – Elisabeth Beresford's children's characters The Wombles are adapted into a stop motion animated television series which begins airing on BBC1. The series is narrated by Bernard Cribbins with music composed by Mike Batt.
- 15 February – The first episode of the sitcom Some Mothers Do 'Ave 'Em, starring Michael Crawford as the bumbling Frank Spencer, airs on BBC1.

=== March ===
- 14 March – Sitcom Are You Being Served?, set in a department store, begins its first regular series on BBC1, six months after the pilot episode had been broadcast as part of the Comedy Playhouse strand. It becomes one of the longest-running BBC comedy shows and goes on to spawn a 1977 British feature film and the spin-off series Grace & Favour which begins in 1992.
- 25 March – The pilot episode of sitcom Open All Hours, set in a corner shop, airs as part of Ronnie Barker's series Seven of One on BBC1.
- 31 March – ITV begins showing the US police series The Streets of San Francisco as the feature-length pilot film airs on Yorkshire Television. Regular one-hour episodes start five days later on 5 April.
- March – Experimental Ceefax teletext transmissions begin.

=== April ===
- 1 April – Ronnie Barker stars in "Prisoner and Escort", the pilot episode of Porridge, airing as part of Seven of One on BBC1.
- 18 April – ITV London begins showing the American horror series Night Gallery, created and hosted by Rod Serling.
- 30 April – Children's science fiction drama The Tomorrow People is shown for the first time on ITV.
- April – The first transmission of Oracle takes place, during Engineering Announcements.

=== May ===
- May – Sesame Street airs on Westward Television for the first time, originally on Sundays until next Summer when it will be shown on Saturdays.
- 5 May–28 July – BBC2 begins airing The Ascent of Man. It is written and presented by Jacob Bronowski and is accompanied by a bestselling book.
- 18 May –
  - The UK's first ever regular breakfast television programme is broadcast. It airs on The Bristol Channel via that city's cable system. It airs between 7.30am and 8.15am and is then repeated twice.
  - ITV London shows the network premiere of the cult British horror film Witchfinder General, starring Vincent Price and Ian Ogilvy. The film is later shown on ITV Midlands and ITV Anglia on 23 November and 10 December.
- 20 May – BBC2 airs the first episode of the American Korean War comedy series M*A*S*H, based on the 1970 movie and starring Alan Alda.
- 26 May – The magazine show That's Life! makes its debut on BBC1, presented by Esther Rantzen. It would run until 1994.

=== June ===
- 13 June – The long-running children's sports themed game show We Are the Champions begins on BBC1.

=== July ===
- 13 July – BBC1 begins airing Jack the Ripper, a 6-part spin-off crime series featuring the fictional BBC Detectives Charlie Barlow (Stratford Johns) and John Watt (Frank Windsor), first seen in Z-Cars. The drama sees the pair investigating the real historic casefiles of Jack the Ripper.

=== August ===
- 6 August – James Beck, who stars as Private Walker in the BBC sitcom Dad's Army, dies of a burst pancreas at the age of 44. Although the series continues until 1977, the part of Walker is not recast and the show carries on without him.
- 15 August – The first episode of the flat-sharing sitcom Man About the House is shown on ITV. Starring Richard O'Sullivan, its success leads to two spin-off ITV sitcoms, George and Mildred and Robin's Nest, as well as a 1974 British feature film.
- 17 August – ITV airs the feature-length pilot episode of the American martial arts western series Kung Fu, starring David Carradine.
- 20 August – Children's magazine-style series Why Don't You? airs for the first time during the 1973 school holidays on BBC1. It would run until 1995.
- 24 August – Trade test colour films are shown on BBC2 for the final time.
- 27 August – BBC1 shows the television premiere of the 1966 comedy film Carry On Screaming!, starring Harry H. Corbett, Kenneth Williams, Jim Dale, Charles Hawtrey, Joan Sims, Bernard Bresslaw and Fenella Fielding.

=== September ===
- 10 September – The Goodies makes its debut in Zambia on ZBS.
- 24 September – BBC1 Leslie Phillips sitcom Casanova '73 is moved at short notice to a later timeslot because of its risqué content; Mastermind (which has just started its second series) replaces it in the earlier slot on 27 September, helping the quiz to become a hit.
- 26 September – Scottish and Grampian show live coverage of a Scotland home football international for the first time when they broadcast the World Cup qualifier between Scotland and Czechoslovakia.
- 28 September – BBC1 begin showing The New Scooby-Doo Movies, with Mystery Inc teaming up with Batman and Robin.

=== October ===
- 8 October – Pat Phoenix leaves the role of Elsie Tanner on Coronation Street after thirteen years although she will make a return to the soap on 5 April 1976.
- 17 October – ITV shows a home England football international live from Wembley for the first time when it broadcasts the World Cup qualifier between England v Poland.
- 20 October – ITV shows the television premiere of Stanley Kubrick's 1960 Roman Gladiator epic Spartacus, starring Kirk Douglas.
- 31 October
  - Thames Television's acclaimed World War II documentary The World at War begins on ITV. Narrated by Laurence Olivier and shown in 26-parts, the series will go on to be widely regarded as a landmark in British broadcasting.
  - The sixth series of the BBC sitcom Dad's Army opens with the episode "The Deadly Attachment" containing the "Don't tell him, Pike!" exchange which becomes rated as one of the top three greatest comedy moments of British television.

=== November ===
- 12 November – First series run of Last of the Summer Wine starts on BBC1.
- 14 November – The BBC and ITV broadcast extensive live coverage of the wedding of Princess Anne and Mark Phillips. The episode of Dad's Army shown by the BBC this evening is "The Royal Train".
- 23 November – 10th anniversary of the first episode of Doctor Who
- 28 November – The Dad's Army episode "The Honourable Man" shown tonight is the last full one featuring actor James Beck due to his death during the series recording (he features in prerecorded portions of the last series episode, "Things That Go Bump in the Night", shown on 5 December). His character, Private Walker, is subsequently written out of the series.
- Smash Martians advertising campaign launches on ITV.

=== December ===
- 17 December – The government announces severe measures to reduce electricity consumption due to the ongoing overtime ban by the National Union of Mineworkers, strike action in the electricity supply industry and effects of the 1973 oil crisis. Part of these measures are that both BBC and ITV television are ordered to end their broadcasting day earlier than usual, at around 10:30pm in order to save energy. The early closedowns commence that day and continue until Sunday 23 December. They are then lifted so that Christmas and New Year programming can air as normal and provide some light relief to the public. The restrictions will be reimposed from Monday 7 January 1974 and remain for a further month.

=== Unknown ===
- Three of the five experimental community cable television channels, authorised the previous year by The UK's Minister for Posts and Telecommunications launch. They are Sheffield Cablevision, The Bristol Channel and Swindon Viewpoint. They join Greenwich Cablevision which had launched the previous year. The fifth, Wellingborough Cablevision, begins broadcasting in February 1974.
- A Hovis bread advert featuring a baker's delivery boy with a bicycle on Gold Hill, Shaftesbury, Dorset, directed by Ridley Scott, is launched on ITV.

== Debuts ==
=== BBC1 ===
- 5 January – Teddy Edward (1973)
- 7 January – Fish (1973)
- 9 January – Whatever Happened to the Likely Lads? (1973–1974)
- 15 January – Alice Through The Looking Glass (1973)
- 25 January – Whoops Baghdad (1973)
- 5 February – The Wombles (1973–1975, 1990–1991, 1997–2000)
- 13 February – The Viaduct (1973)
- 15 February – Some Mothers Do 'Ave 'Em (1973–1978)
- 18 February – A Little Princess (1973)
- 26 February – The Crocodile (1973)
- 13 March – Lizzie Dripping (1973–1975)
- 4 April – Barnaby (1973)
- 25 April – The Gordon Peters Show (1973)
- 11 May – Scotch on the Rocks (1973)
- 26 May – That's Life! (1973–1994)
- 6 June – Son of the Bride (1973)
- 7 June – Warship (1973–1977)
- 13 June – We Are the Champions (1973–1995)
- 16 June – Sutherland's Law (1973–1976)
- 13 July – Jack the Ripper (1973)
- 19 July – Centre Play (1973–1978)
- 20 August – Why Don't You? (1973–1995)
- 1 September – Moonbase 3 (1973)
- 12 September – Oh, Father! (1973)
- 13 September – Casanova '73 (1973)
- 14 September – The Donati Conspiracy (1973)
- 27 September – Jane Eyre (1973)
- 28 September – The New Scooby-Doo Movies (1972–1973)
- 7 October – Pollyanna (1973)
- 12 November
  - Heil Caesar! (1973)
  - The Terracotta Horse (1973)
  - Last of the Summer Wine (1973–2010)

=== BBC2 ===
- 16 January – Look and Read: Joe and the Sheep Rustlers (1973)
- 15 February – Weir of Hermiston (1973)
- 4 March – The Pearcross Girls (1973)
- 25 March – Seven of One (1973)
- 1 April – Away from It All (1973)
- 19 April – Cheri (1973)
- 1 May – A Picture of Katherine Mansfield (1973)
- 5 May — The Ascent of Man (1973)
- 20 May – M*A*S*H (1972–1983)
- 24 May – The Song of Songs (1973)
- 28 June – Two Women (1973)
- 26 July – A Pin to See the Peepshow (1973)
- 14 August – Black and Blue (1973)
- 6 September – Then and Now (1973)
- 23 September – The Dragon's Opponent (1973)
- 15 October – Second City Firsts (1973–1978)
- 8 December – Vienna 1900 (1973–1974)
- 14 December – Frost's Weekly (1973–1974)
- 27 December – The Vera Lynn Show (1973–1975)

=== ITV ===
- 1 January – Pipkins (1973–1981)
- 17 January – Whose's Baby? (1973; 1977; 1982–1988)
- 14 February – All Our Saturdays (1973)
- 3 February – No Man's Land (1973)
- 5 February – Mister Trimble (1973–1977)
- 25 February – The Upper Crusts (1973)
- 28 February – The Jensen Code (1973)
- 12 March – Hickory House (1973–1977)
- 13 March – So It Goes (1973)
- 31 March – The Streets of San Francisco (1972–1977)
- 8 April – Our Kid (1973)
- 11 April – Armchair 30 (1973)
- 14 April – Thriller (1973–1976)
- 18 April – Night Gallery (1969–1973)
- 30 April – The Tomorrow People (1973–1979, 1992–1995)
- 2 May – Dolly (1973)
- 11 May – Between the Wars (1973)
- 15 May – Hey Brian! (1973)
- 30 May – The Kids from 47A (1973–1974)
- 4 June – Hunter's Walk (1973–1976)
- 12 June – Sam (1973–1975)
- 26 June – Nobody Is Norman Wisdom (1973)
- 3 July – Sally and Jake (1973–1974)
- 11 July – Shabby Tiger (1973)
- 13 July – Sir Yellow (1973)
- 29 July – Bowler (1973)
- 12 August – Once Upon a Time (1973)
- 15 August
  - Man About the House (1973–1976)
  - Reg Varney (1973–1974)
- 17 August – Kung Fu (1972–1975)
- 1 September – Orson Welles' Great Mysteries (1973–1974)
- 4 September – Up the Workers (1973–1976)
- 21 September – Helen: A Woman of Today (1973)
- 29 September – New Faces (1973–1978, 1986–1988)
- 30 September – The Brontës of Haworth (1973)
- 3 October – Men of Affairs (1973)
- 26 October – Billy Liar (1973–1974)
- 29 October – Tell Tarby (1973)
- 30 October – Marked Personal (1973–1974)
- 31 October
  - The Tommy Cooper Hour (1973–1975)
  - The World at War (1973–1974)
- 1 November – Beryl's Lot (1973–1977)
- 4 November – Oranges & Lemons (1973)
- 12 November
  - Potty Time (1973–1980)
  - Roberts Robots (1973–1974)

== Television shows ==
=== Returning this year after a break of one year or longer ===
- Sunday Night at the London Palladium (1955–1967, 1973–1974)

== Continuing television shows ==
=== 1920s ===
- BBC Wimbledon (1927–1939, 1946–2019, 2021–present)

=== 1930s ===
- Trooping the Colour (1937–1939, 1946–2019, 2023–present)
- The Boat Race (1938–1939, 1946–2019, 2021–present)
- BBC Cricket (1939, 1946–1999, 2020–2024)

=== 1950s ===
- Come Dancing (1950–1998)
- Watch with Mother (1952–1975)
- The Good Old Days (1953–1983)
- Panorama (1953–present)
- Dixon of Dock Green (1955–1976)
- Crackerjack (1955–1970, 1972–1984, 2020–2021)
- Opportunity Knocks (1956–1978, 1987–1990)
- This Week (1956–1978, 1986–1992)
- Armchair Theatre (1956–1974)
- What the Papers Say (1956–2008)
- The Sky at Night (1957–present)
- Blue Peter (1958–present)
- Grandstand (1958–2007)

=== 1960s ===
- Coronation Street (1960–present)
- Songs of Praise (1961–present)
- Steptoe and Son (1962–1965, 1970–1974)
- Z-Cars (1962–1978)
- Animal Magic (1962–1983)
- Doctor Who (1963–1989, 1996, 2005–present)
- World in Action (1963–1998)
- Top of the Pops (1964–2006)
- Match of the Day (1964–present)
- Crossroads (1964–1988, 2001–2003)
- Play School (1964–1988)
- Mr. and Mrs. (1965–1999)
- Call My Bluff (1965–2005)
- World of Sport (1965–1985)
- Jackanory (1965–1996, 2006)
- Sportsnight (1965–1997)
- It's a Knockout (1966–1982, 1999–2001)
- The Money Programme (1966–2010)
- The Golden Shot (1967–1975)
- Playhouse (1967–1982)
- Reksio (1967–1990)
- Dad's Army (1968–1977)
- Magpie (1968–1980)
- The Big Match (1968–2002)
- Clangers (1969–1974, 2015–present)
- Monty Python's Flying Circus (1969–1974)
- Nationwide (1969–1983)
- Screen Test (1969–1984)

=== 1970s ===
- The Goodies (1970–1982)
- Upstairs, Downstairs (1971–1975, 2010–2012)
- Bless This House (1971–1976)
- The Onedin Line (1971–1980)
- The Old Grey Whistle Test (1971–1987)
- The Two Ronnies (1971–1987, 1991, 1996, 2005)
- Colditz (1972–1974)
- The Protectors (1972–1974)
- Love Thy Neighbour (1972–1976)
- Thunderbirds (1972–1980, 1984–1987)
- Clapperboard (1972–1982)
- Crown Court (1972–1984)
- Pebble Mill at One (1972–1986, 1991–1996)
- Are You Being Served? (1972–1985)
- Rainbow (1972–1992, 1994–1997)
- Emmerdale (1972–present)
- Newsround (1972–present)
- Weekend World (1972–1988)

== Ending this year ==
- Father, Dear Father (1968–1973)
- Freewheelers (1968–1973)
- Nearest and Dearest (1968–1973)
- Ooh La La! (1968–1973)
- The Flaxton Boys (1969–1973)
- On the Buses (1969–1973)
- Crime of Passion (1970–1973)
- ...And Mother Makes Three (1971–1973)
- The Fenn Street Gang (1971–1973)
- Now Look Here (1971–1973)
- Follyfoot (1971–1973)
- Arthur of the Britons (1972–1973)
- Thirty Minutes Worth (1972–1973)
- War and Peace (1972–1973)
- Woodstock (1973)

== Births ==
- 18 January – Ben Willbond, comedy actor-writer
- 29 January – Miranda Krestovnikoff, scientific presenter
- 7 February – Kate Thornton, journalist and presenter
- 8 February – Sonia Deol, presenter
- 3 March – Alison King, actress
- 5 April – Jason Done, actor
- 24 April – Gabby Logan, media presenter
- 30 April – Leigh Francis, comedian
- 8 May – Marcus Brigstocke, English comedian, actor and screenwriter
- 19 May – Alice Roberts, biological anthropologist and scientific presenter
- 21 May – Noel Fielding, comedian and actor
- 24 May – Dermot O'Leary, media presenter
- 26 May – Julie Wilson Nimmo, Scottish actress
- 2 June – Ortis Deley, television presenter
- 9 June – Iain Lee, comedian and media presenter
- 16 June – Amanda Byram, Irish-born presenter
- 25 June – Sunetra Sarker, actress
- 3 July – Emma Cunniffe, actress
- 17 September – Jason Mohammad, Welsh radio and television sports presenter
- October – Alex Mahon, television executive
- 11 October – Mark Chapman, broadcaster and newsreader
- 21 October – Bev Turner, media presenter
- 5 November – Danniella Westbrook, actress and television presenter
- 30 November – Alex Macqueen, actor
- 8 December – Kim Medcalf, actress

== Deaths ==
- 31 March – George Woodbridge, 66, actor (Inigo Pipkin in Pipkins)
- 18 Jun – Roger Delgado 55, actor (The Master in Doctor Who)
- 6 August – James Beck, 44, actor (Private Walker in Dad's Army)

== See also ==
- 1973 in British music
- 1973 in British radio
- 1973 in the United Kingdom
- List of British films of 1973
