= Cablevision (disambiguation) =

Cablevision was an American cable television operator with systems serving areas surrounding New York City.

Cablevision may also refer to:

- Cablevisión (Argentina), an Argentine cable television operator, owned by Clarín group
- Cablevision (Canada), a Canadian cable television operator in the province of Quebec and parts of Ontario
- CableVision (Green Bay, Wisconsin), a cable television operator that operated out of Green Bay, Wisconsin, United States from the 1980s to the mid-1990s.
- Cablevision Industries, an American cable television operator unrelated to New York based Cablevision Systems; acquired in 1995 by Time Warner Cable
- Greenwich Cablevision, London community television station, active in the 1970s
- Heritage Cablevision, Des Moines, Iowa cable television provider, active 1971–1987
- Izzi Telecom, a Mexican cable television operator owned by Grupo Televisa, called Cablevisión until November 2014
- Medford Community Cablevision, Inc., Medford, Massachusetts public-access television station
- Mountain Cablevision, cable television provider in Hamilton, Ontario
- Omineca Cablevision, cable television and internet service provider in Omineca Country, British Columbia
- Sheffield Cablevision, Sheffield, England cable television community channel, active 1973–1976
- Troy Cablevision, Alabama cable television, cable internet, security systems, and VOIP provider
- UA-Columbia Cablevision, an American cable television provider, active from the 1970s to 1991
- Wellingborough Cablevision, Northamptonshire, England cable television broadcaster, active 1974–1975

== See also ==
- Cable television
