= Mix 92.6 =

Coordinates: 51.754218°N 0.333386°W

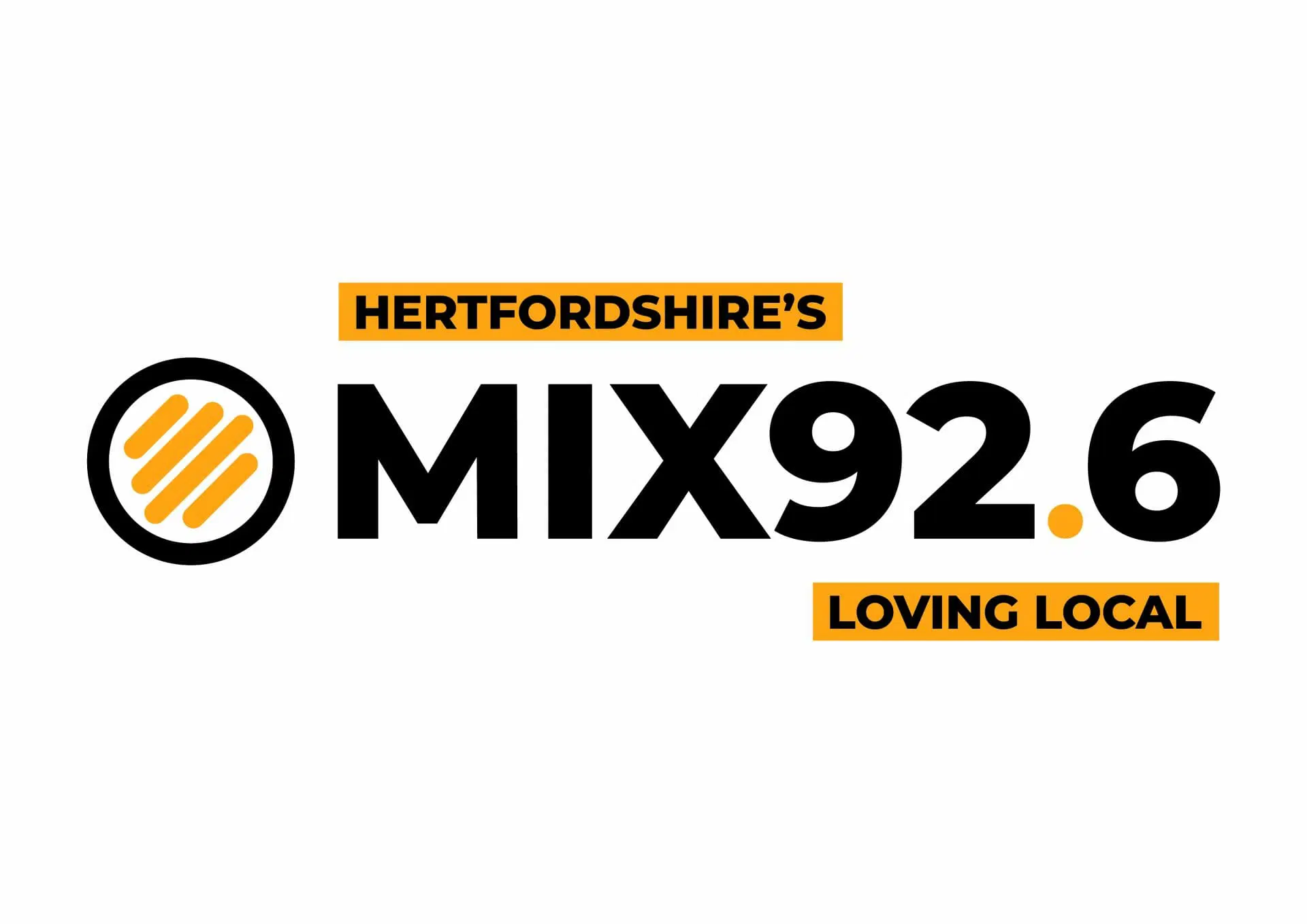
- St Albans; England
- Broadcast area: South Hertfordshire
- Frequency: FM: 92.6 MHz

Programming
- Format: Community radio

Ownership
- Owner: Verulam Community Radio Limited

Links
- Webcast: MP3 Stream
- Website: Mix 92.6

Mix 92.6 (formerly Radio Verulam) is a Hertfordshire based non-profit community radio station run by Verulam Community Radio Ltd (VCRL).

The station is staffed by over 70 presentation, production and technical volunteers .

Until April 2010, Radio Verulam was based in Victoria Street, St Albans moved to Hatfield Road until 2021 and since August 2022 has renamed and become "Hertfordshire's Mix 92.6". The station has a coverage area extending across South Hertfordshire and can be heard on 92.6 FM in Hatfield, Hemel Hempstead, St Albans, Harpenden and surrounding areas.

== Station ethos ==
Mix 92.6 aims to enable local people to become involved in radio broadcasting and connect with local community, charitable, social and voluntary organisations. The station serves listeners of all ages and backgrounds living in St Albans and the surrounding area.

Daytime output typically comprises 75% music and 25% speech (‘speech’ excludes advertising, programme/promotional trails and sponsor credits). Night-time output typically comprises 90% music and 10% speech.

Music output during daytime features popular music from the 1960s through to the present day, selected ‘soft’ current hits and local music from the local pub/club music scene. Overnight (10 pm to 6 am) music includes mellow love songs. At other times, mainly weekends, specialist programmes feature music such as folk, jazz, traditional Irish, classical, big band, jazz and Christian music.

Speech output comprises discussions, interviews, informative features (covering, for example, health, money, food, travel), local sports, events diary, national news, local and community news and information.

The majority of the output is locally produced.

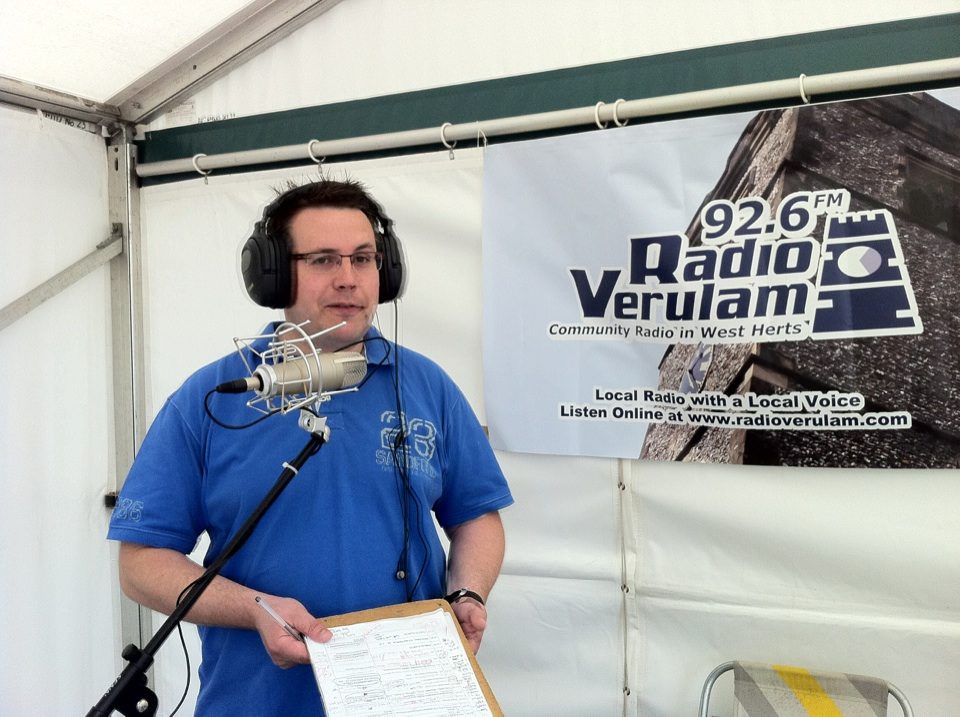
A Radio Verulam outside broadcast from the Herts County Show, summer 2011

In 2010 a team from Radio Verulam won the Radio Academy's Christmas Music Quiz, beating teams from local and national radio stations, including BBC Radio 6 Music, BBC Radio 1Xtra, Smooth Radio, Heart FM & Magic FM. In 2015 Radio Verulam won the Voluntary Sector Award in the Mayor's Pride Awards. In 2017 won a silver award in the Sports Show of the Year category from the Community Media Association

== History ==
=== Beginnings ===
Radio Verulam began with the idea that St Albans might benefit from a radio station designed specifically for the diverse community of this historic city.

Clive Glover, who had worked as a volunteer at City Radio (the hospital radio at St Albans City Hospital) during most of the 1980s, launched an appeal for members of the public to join him in creating a community radio station for the city of St Albans. A public meeting in 1992 drew support from the local population and, one year later, Verulam Community Radio Limited (VCRL) was incorporated.

In 1993, as a result of lobbying by VCRL, the Radio Authority decided to advertise a commercial radio licence for St Albans, adding Watford to the area served by the proposed license. The license was awarded to the largest commercial radio operator in the area at the time, Chiltern Radio, operating under the name of Oasis Radio.

=== Telecential ===
After being declined for the commercial radio licence, VCRL were offered the opportunity to launch Radio Verulam as a cable radio station alongside the existing Community Television service 'West Herts TV' on the local cable system based in Hemel Hempstead. A team of presenters began broadcasting as Radio Verulam on the Telecential cable system on Saturday 24 February 1996, initially for just three hours a day.

Changes at the Telecential cable company meant that the station had to relocate around Easter 1997. The station moved to premises in Apsley in November 1997 where the station remained for the next eight years.

=== Apsley ===
By 2000, Radio Verulam was broadcasting 24 hours a day from Apsley on cable and now also online via the station website with a team of twenty presenters.

Radio Verulam was awarded a three-week restricted service licence in 2004, allowing the station to broadcast live throughout that year's St Albans Carnival. OFCOM subsequently announced the opportunity for the first time for applications to be made for community radio broadcasting licences. On 16 March 2006, Radio Verulam was granted a full broadcasting licence.

Radio Verulam ran another restricted service licence from the town hall during the St Albans Festival in the Summer of 2006. Following negotiations, the station began transmissions from the new premises in Victoria Street on 7 July 2007.

== Broadcasting ==
Mix 92.6 now broadcasts 24 hours a day from its studios in central St Albans on 92.6 MHz FM and via an online stream, although FM reception is subject to interference from local pirate radio stations in some areas.

== Programming ==
The radio station is home to a wide range of locally produced shows, including:

=== Daytime ===
(Monday–Friday 6 am – 7 pm)

- Mix Breakfast: Mix 92.6's breakfast show
- Mix Mornings:
- Mix Lunchtime:
- Mix Afternoons: Popular music, interspersed with items of local interest.
- Drive: Classic music from today & yesterday, up-to-the-minute travel news, local features & entertainment.

=== Evening ===
- The Evening Session: A weekly showcase of local music and a guide to local performances.
- The Parents' Show: A weekly show produced and presented by local parents with the aim of providing parents or anyone who cares for children with up-to-date information and resources on the issues that matter to them.
- Environment Matters: A weekly look at local environmental issues
- Bouche à Oreille: a weekly magazine-style show broadcast exclusively in French.
- The Local Sports Mix: an award winning look at the local sports scene.
- Live & Local a Specialist Music Show, show casing local bands & artists;

=== Weekend ===
- Live Football Commentary of St Albans City FC, home & away.
- The Weekend Wake Up! 8am -11am Saturday and Sunday with Jonny Seabrook
- Mike Naylor’s Music Mix - the new home of the legendary ex-BBC presenter. Sunday 2pm-4pm
- Peter Fielding’s Sunday Mix. Join the ex-Capital Gold presenter from 11am- 2pm
- Dereck Staines’ Saturday Music Show: Music & nostalgia from the 60s to the last decade.
- Saturday Late Date
- The soul and jazz show on Saturday evenings with Mark Slade
- The 80s Mixtape Sunday 4pm- 6pm
