= Smallworld Cable =

Former British telecommunications company

Smallworld Cable Ltd
- Company type: Subsidiary of Virgin Media
- Industry: Telecommunications
- Founded: 2001 (as Omne Communications)
- Defunct: 2014
- Headquarters: Morecambe, United Kingdom (Registered office); Irvine, United Kingdom (Head office)
- Key people: Graham Clare — General Manager
- Products: Cable television broadband telephone
- Parent: Virgin Media O2
- Website: www.smallworldcable.com (archived in 2014)

Smallworld Fibre (previously Smallworld Cable, Wightcable North and OMNE) was a British telecommunications company based in Irvine, North Ayrshire. Their coverage area used to be Irvine, Dreghorn, Troon, and Kilmarnock in the west of Scotland, and Carlisle, Lancaster and Morecambe in the northwest of England, where they served over 40,000 homes. Smallworld provided broadband, telephone, and digital television services to residential customers from 2001 to 2014, when the company was acquired by Virgin Media.

== History ==
The company was founded in the summer of 2001 as Omne Communications by former employees of BT and NTL. Their television service launched in December after being granted a local delivery service licence by the ITC.

In May 2002, Omne Communications entered administration. On 1 February 2003, it was announced that CLS Holdings, owners of WightCable, had acquired a 76% stake in the company for £4.1 million, saving it from closure. The company was rebranded later that year from Omne to WightCable North.

In January 2006, WightCable North was sold by CLS Holdings, at a loss of £2.1 million, to Netfonics. In March 2007, WightCable North was rebranded as Smallworld Media.

In December 2009, Smallworld Media rebranded itself as Smallworld Cable and introduced a new logo. On 18 December 2009, Smallworld announced that they had completed core network upgrades and planned to roll out faster 50 Mbit/s DOCSIS 3.0 broadband across its cable network. The company also confirmed they had connected the large village of Dreghorn to their network, increasing their customer base by around 1,200 homes.

In early 2013, Smallworld Cable changed its name to Smallworld Fibre.

On 3 February 2014, Smallworld Fibre was acquired by Virgin Media for an undisclosed fee. The deal saw Smallworld's network merged into Virgin Media's during 2014. In December 2014, Virgin Media axed the Smallworld Fibre brand and switched all viewers to the Virgin Media network.

== Products and services ==
As a "triple play" cable provider with its own network, Smallworld Fibre provided cable TV, broadband, and fixed line telephone services.

=== Broadband ===
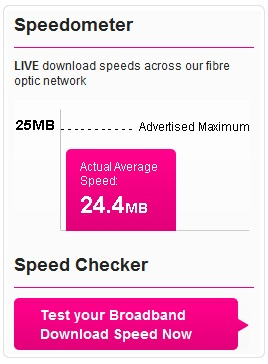
Smallworld Speedometer on their website

Smallworld provided three tiers of service (as of December 2013) of 25 Mbit/s, 50 Mbit/s and 100 Mbit/s download speeds. These speeds were only available to customers within their cable network footprint and ADSL broadband services were available for customers who wanted service outside their cable network. Wireless home network kits were available to customers for an additional fee. Standard installation tended to be free of charge when broadband was taken as part of a bundle with other products. Smallworld advertised their broadband as a fibre-optic network, but they utilised a hybrid fibre-coaxial network to distribute service to customers, similar to the topology of Virgin Media.

Smallworld ran a "speedometer" on its website that gave a live view of the average network speed on the cable network they provided but not the internet speed. As of 21 December 2009 this speed stood at 24.4 Mbit/s (out of 25 Mbit/s). The speed test was removed by March 2010, though they gave a server for speed testing on speedtest.net.

The upload speeds were 200 kbit/s for the 2 Mbit/s download service, 350 kbit/s for 10 Mbit/s, 512 kbit/s for 25 Mbit/s, and 1.5 Mbit/s for 50 Mbit/s.

=== Cable TV ===
Smallworld provided a digital TV service over its cable TV network with over 120 channels including all local terrestrial services and subscription services, such as Sky Sports and Sky Movies. Multiroom services were available for an additional fee.

=== Telephone ===
Fixed line phone services were available within the Smallworld Fibre network that included features such as caller IDs, call forwarding and voicemail. Smallworld offered free local calls to its cable phone customers and its local area covering Scotland, Northern Ireland and "a large section of Northern England".

== Sponsorships ==
Smallworld Cable was the main strip sponsor of Kilmarnock F.C.
