= Sky Cinema =

British subscription film service owned by Sky Group

- Logo used since 2026

- Alternate Logo for UI/EPG, digital and small format spaces.
- Country: United Kingdom
- Broadcast area: United Kingdom; Ireland
- Headquarters: London, England

Programming
- Picture format: 2160p UHDTV (downscaled to 1080i and 16:9 576i for their HDTV and SDTV feeds respectively)

Ownership
- Owner: Sky Group (Comcast)
- Sister channels: List of Sky UK channels

History
- Launched: 5 February 1989; 37 years ago
- Replaced: The Power Station (on the BSB service); Disney Cinemagic (UK & Ireland, Sky Cinema Disney)
- Former names: Sky Movies (1989–98, 2002–16)

Links
- Website: www.sky.com/tv/cinema

Availability

Streaming media
- Sky Go: Watch live (UK & Ireland only)
- Now TV: Watch live (UK and Ireland only)
- Virgin TV Anywhere: Watch live (UK only)

Sky Cinema is a British subscription film service owned by Sky Group (a division of Comcast). In the United Kingdom, Sky Cinema channels currently broadcast on the Sky satellite and Virgin Media cable platforms, and in addition Sky Cinema on demand content are available through these as well as via Now, BT TV and TalkTalk TV.

In 2016, Sky rebranded its television film channel operations under one single branding on 8 July, the channels in the United Kingdom and Ireland were rebranded from Sky Movies to Sky Cinema; on 22 September in Germany and Austria, the Sky Cinema brand (originally used for the flagship network) was extended to the German channels in the group formerly known as Sky Film; the Italian Sky Cinema channels followed suit on 5 November by adopting the brand packages introduced in the United Kingdom and Ireland earlier.

Output includes movie premieres from Universal Pictures, Paramount Pictures, Warner Bros. Pictures, Studiocanal (from 2026) Sony Pictures (until 2027) and Sky original films.

== History ==
=== 1989–1998: early years ===
Launching on 5 February 1989, Sky Movies was one of the four channels that formed the Sky Television network on the Astra 1b satellite system (the others being Sky News, Eurosport and Sky Channel (which later became Sky One). The first film shown on the channel was Project X. Before the launch, Sky signed deals with companies such as Orion Pictures and Columbia Pictures to secure first-run rights to the newest films for the channel. Sky Movies was originally planned to timeshare with a UK version of The Disney Channel, but following a settled lawsuit between Sky Television and Disney in May, the latter eventually agreed to a five-year deal to supply films from Walt Disney Pictures and Touchstone Pictures to the Sky Movies schedule the following month.

Sky Movies remained free to anyone with a Sky Television subscription until 1990, when it became the first television network in the country to scramble its signal, using an encryption system called VideoCrypt. Anyone attempting to view it without a decoder and smart card could only see a scrambled picture. With the encryption, Sky Movies began to air Pay-Per-View Sporting events such as boxing matches and World Wrestling Federation events, which were available at no extra cost to existing viewers of the channel, and as such during this period the network was normally referred to Sky Movies Plus. The first event shown by the channel was Mike Tyson vs. Buster Douglas on 11 February 1990. On 2 November, Sky Television merged with rival British Satellite Broadcasting and formed British Sky Broadcasting. BSB had already broadcast a movie network of their own, named The Movie Channel, which was now a sister network to Sky Movies.

With the launch of the second SES Astra satellite (1B) on 15 April 1991, The Movie Channel officially launched on Sky's satellite service and gained a brand new look. Sky Movies was also made available on the Marcopolo Satellite beginning on 8 April, replacing BSB's music channel The Power Station. on 6 May, both networks started broadcasting 24 hours a day. In addition of these slots for 6.00 pm, 8.00 pm and 10.00 pm, Sky Movies had several different film genres used every evening, such as:

- Monday Night Comedy
- Tuesday Night Action
- Thursday Night Horror
- After Dark – used for Saturday and Wednesday nights at approximately 11.30 pm, which included erotic films with a 18 certificate that often shows sexually explicit material and various adult-oriented content.

At the same time, The Movie Channel started to begin its evening films at the later slots of 6.15 pm, 8.15 pm, and 10.15 pm. It also showed children's films at around 4.00 pm and classic movies during the daytime hours, from early morning until the 4 pm children's film.

On 1 October 1992, a third network in the package, Sky Movies Gold, was launched on the transponder formerly home to The Comedy Channel. This network focused more on "classic" films, with Rocky II being the first film to air on the network upon its launch at 6:00 pm. The channel broadcast from 4.00 pm to midnight every day, timesharing with TV Asia. On 31 December, Sky stopped broadcasting all its networks on the Marcopolo Satellite, including Sky Movies and The Movie Channel.

From 1 February 1993, BSkyB introduced a new system of ratings for Sky Movies. The Movie Channel and Sky Movies Gold were used at various times replacing the British Board of Film Classification certificates which lasted over four years, and remained on air until 31 October 1997:

Rating	Description
U	Universal – suitable for all audiences at any time.
PG	Parental Guidance – some scenes may be unsuitable for young or sensitive children.
7	Suitable for transmission at 7.00 pm, may also include edited versions of any otherwise unsuitable titles with the BBFC PG (or 12) certificate until it was later dropped and never used on air.
8	Suitable for transmission at 8.00 pm, broadly in line with the BBFC 15 certificate.
9	This classification reflecting the 9.00 pm watershed, which covers films of more adult nature that may contain strong language or violence.
10	Suitable for transmission at 10.00 pm, is equivalent to the BBFC 18 certificate and that is suitable for adults only.
11	Suitable for transmission during 11.00 pm, in which films of an explicit nature for adult viewing but mostly showing uncut versions offer include martial arts and erotic films were also used.

As part of the launch of Sky Multichannels in September 1993, the three movie networks remained as their own package, although for a limited time, those who were already subscribed to the package would get Sky Multichannels at no extra cost.

TV Asia moved to a different transponder in March 1995, so for a short period Sky Movies Gold would be the lone network in its slot and during the summer months of this period it broadcast non-film programming during the day, with an overall on-air time of 9:00 am to 2:00 am.. This continued until 1 October, when it would become home to a British version of The Disney Channel, which meant that Sky Movies Gold's broadcasting hours were changed to 10:00 pm - 6:00 am.

=== Relaunch (1997-1998) ===
On 10 October 1997, Sky announced that it would relaunch Sky Movies and The Movie Channel as Sky Movies Screen 1 and Sky Movies Screen 2 from 1 November, while Sky Movies Gold would remain as is. From 1 December, the Sky Box Office pay-per-view service added movies to its lineup and launched four dedicated channels on various transponders on the Astra 1B satellite. Movies broadcast on those networks would be shown in advance of their broadcast on the main Sky Movies portfolio. Sky Movies Gold would move to a different transponder on Astra 1C by that date alongside Sky Travel, with Sky Box Office 1 replacing it in its former Astra 1B slot with Disney Channel.

=== 1998–2007: digital era ===
On 22 July 1998, Sky announced that the Sky Movies portfolio would undergo a second rebranding from 10 October 1998, with Sky Movies Screen 1 becoming Sky MovieMax, Sky Movies Screen 2 becoming Sky Premier and Sky Movies Gold becoming Sky Cinema.

The launch of Sky Digital from the new Astra 28.2°E satellite position on 1 October 1998 was accompanied by a major channel expansion for the Sky Movies portfolio. With this, Sky launched additional multiplex channels; Sky Premier 2 to 4, Sky MovieMax 2 to 4, and Sky Cinema 2. On 15 November, Sky Premier Widescreen was launched – becoming the only British channel devoted to showing widescreen material.

In 1999, Sky MovieMax and Sky Premier launched on the ONDigital terrestrial platform. On 1 October 1999, an additional multiplex channel, Sky MovieMax 5 was launched. This brought along the number of Sky premium movie networks to twelve.

On 23 May 2002, Sky announced that its movie networks would all be rebranded under the single "Sky Movies" suffix from 1 July, and would have a change of focus in content. Sky Premier would become Sky Movies Premier, focusing on blockbusters; Sky MovieMax would become Sky Movies Max, focusing on action and comedy; and Sky Cinema would become Sky Movies Cinema, focusing on classic films. The relaunch would also coincide with the launch of a Sky Movies website portal, which would feature over 40,000 film reviews and schedules for the twelve networks in addition to non-Sky-owned channels.

On 28 April 2003, Sky announced that it would expand widescreen showings of films across the entire Sky Movies multiplex, meaning that Sky Movies Premier Widescreen would cease operations on 3 June, with no replacement. Sky also announced that 5.1 stereo sound films would be broadcast on the first three Sky Movies Premier networks. On 20 October, Sky announced that the entire Sky Movies Premier and Sky Movies Max multiplex networks would undergo a full rebrand on 1 November with a new logo and refreshed package, becoming Sky Movies 1-9. The Sky Movies Cinema channels would remain as is and revert to their previous name, Sky Cinema.

Sky Movies, along with numerous other channels, became available to watch via Sky Mobile TV in 2005, in partnership with Vodafone.

On 3 January 2006, Sky announced that from 1 February, they would make a major change to its multiplex portfolio to allow films with a 15 certificate to air as early as 5:00 pm on Sky Movies 9 and the newly-launched Sky Movies 10, which was the first time such films would be allowed to be broadcast on British television before the watershed. Sky Movies 9 would become PIN-protected and its broadcast hours would be reduced to 5:00 pm-3:00 am, with Sky Movies 10 adopting the same pattern. The change went into place as planned on that day. In May 2006, both networks gained high-definition simulcasts as part of the launch of the Sky HD platform.

=== 2007–2016: Sky Movies gets categorised ===
Sky Movies was overhauled on 4 April 2007, when the different channels became dedicated to different genres, but three of the HD channels have launched already before the other:

- Premiere
- Premiere +1
- Comedy
- Action & Thriller
- Family
- Drama
- Sci Fi & Horror
- Classics
- Modern Greats
- Indie
- HD1/SD1
- HD2/SD2

Sky later made Sky Movies HD1 and HD2 available to subscribers without HDTV equipment through two channels simulcasting the same content in SDTV format, the channels were known as Sky Movies SD1 and SD2. These channels were renamed Sky Movies Screen 1 and Screen 2 in February 2008, and the HDTV channels were renamed Sky Movies Screen 1 HD and Screen 2 HD accordingly. On 20 March 2008, an additional high-definition film channel called Sky Movies Premiere HD, which is a simulcast version of the current Sky Movies Premiere channel, was added after many requests for the channel from Sky HD subscribers.

Sky also announced that in October 2008, they would launch six new high-definition simulcast channels called Sky Movies Action/Thriller HD, Sky Movies Sci-Fi/Horror HD, Sky Movies Drama HD, Sky Movies Modern Greats HD, Sky Movies Family HD and Sky Movies Comedy HD. This means that almost all Sky Movies channels are broadcast in both standard- and high-definition except for Sky Movies Premiere +1, Sky Movies Classics and Sky Movies Indie which remained standard-definition only until Sky Movies Indie HD launched on 26 October 2009. Sky Movies were rebranded as the part of the various Sky channels on 1 January 2010.

On 26 March 2010, some Sky Movies channels were renamed, the new Sky Movies Showcase that replaces Sky Movies Screen 1 were devoted to box sets, collections and seasons. Sky Movies also reshuffled its bouquet of ten channels to achieve greater "clarity" for subscribers. The changes included Sky Movies Action & Thriller becoming Sky Movies Action & Adventure, Sky Movies Drama becoming Sky Movies Drama & Romance and Sky Movies Screen 2 becoming Sky Movies Crime & Thriller. The Sky Movies HD channels launched on the Virgin Media platform on 2 August 2010.

Sky Movies Classics HD launched on 9 August 2010 was exclusively on Sky, and the channel was also added to Virgin Media on 4 October 2011. Smallworld Cable added the Sky Movies HD channels to their line-up in the first quarter of 2012, followed by Virgin Media Ireland on 16 August 2012.

On 28 March 2013, Sky Movies Disney was launched that effectively replaces Disney Cinemagic, as part of a multi-year film output deal between Sky and The Walt Disney Company. This marks the first time that Disney has been involved in a co-branded linear film channel anywhere in the world, included new Disney films are available on Sky Movies Disney around six months after they have ended their cinema run. To facilitate the channel, Sky Movies Classics has ceased broadcasting, when Sky Movies Modern Greats was rebranded as Sky Movies Greats and Sky Movies Indie became Sky Movies Select, whether the content of the three former brands was merged into Select and Greats.

=== 2016–present: rebrand and 4K UHD ===
On 15 June 2016, Sky announced that Sky Movies would rebrand as Sky Cinema on 8 July within this change aligns the channel's naming with those of Sky's film services in other European countries, in consort with Sky plc's takeover of Sky Deutschland and Sky Italia. To compete with subscription video-on-demand services, Sky announced that the rebranded network would premiere "a new film each day", and that it would expand the service's on-demand library. Sky also announced plans to launch a 4K ultra-high-definition feed later in the year. 4K films became available on 13 August 2016 for Sky Q customers in a 2TB box with Sky Cinema and multi-screen packs, as well as 70 were available by the end of 2016. During this time, the Sky Cinema networks would have their electronic program guide positions rebranded to tie into a highlight film, actor, or property being carried by that network throughout a certain month; for instance, a month filled with films starring Tom Hanks saw Sky Cinema Greats become Sky Tom Hanks for that period of time.

Since 2016, Sky Cinema has traditionally broadcast the 1993 comedy film Groundhog Day on a continuous loop every 2 February on Sky Cinema Comedy. Not only does it broadcast Groundhog Day on the day it takes place but also references its time loop plot by showing it repeatedly over and over again. The repeated broadcast starts on 6am 2 February and lasts 24 hours until 6am 3 February, a total of 13 separate screenings.

On 22 June 2020, Sky added a content warning to several older films stating that they "have outdated attitudes, language, and cultural depictions which may cause offence today".

On 30 June 2020, several of Sky Cinema's standard definition channels were fully discontinued. This move also coincided with the Sky Cinema brand adopting the 2020 Sky channel branding previously adopted by the entertainment channels following the launch of Sky Comedy. On 30 March 2022, the SD feeds of Sky Cinema Comedy, Sky Cinema Thriller and Sky Cinema Drama were similarly withdrawn. On 29 May 2024, the SD feeds of Sky Cinema Premiere, Sky Cinema Greats, Sky Cinema Family and Sky Cinema Action were removed from Sky.

On 23 July 2020, Sky Cinema launched a twelfth channel, Sky Cinema Animation, replaces Sky Cinema Premiere +1 on Sky and Virgin Media, and launched exclusively in high-definition on both platforms. Sky Cinema Premiere +1 continued to air on Virgin Media Ireland until its removal on 13 August 2020. The timeshift resumed broadcasting on 6 January 2021, replacing Sky Cinema Disney, which was shut down on 30 December 2020 (with the content moving into Disney+) and was temporarily replaced by Sky Cinema Five Star Movies from the next day (31 December) until Premiere +1's return on 6 January 2021. On 30 April 2024, Sky Cinema Premiere +1 closed again, with Movies 24 moving to its old Sky EPG slot of 312.

Sky Cinema subscribers are able to access Paramount+ (with ads) in the United Kingdom, Ireland, Italy, Germany, Switzerland and Austria without charge, which was inaugurated by the summer of 2022.

== Channels ==
=== Current ===
Channel number	Channel name
301	Sky Cinema Premiere
302	Sky Cinema Pop-Up
303	Sky Cinema Pop-Up 2
304	Sky Cinema Family
305	Disney+ Cinema
306	Sky Cinema Action
307	Sky Cinema Greats
308	Sky Cinema Comedy
309	Sky Cinema Thriller
310	Sky Cinema Drama
311	Sky Cinema Sci-Fi & Horror

==== Disney+ Cinema ====
Disney+ Cinema
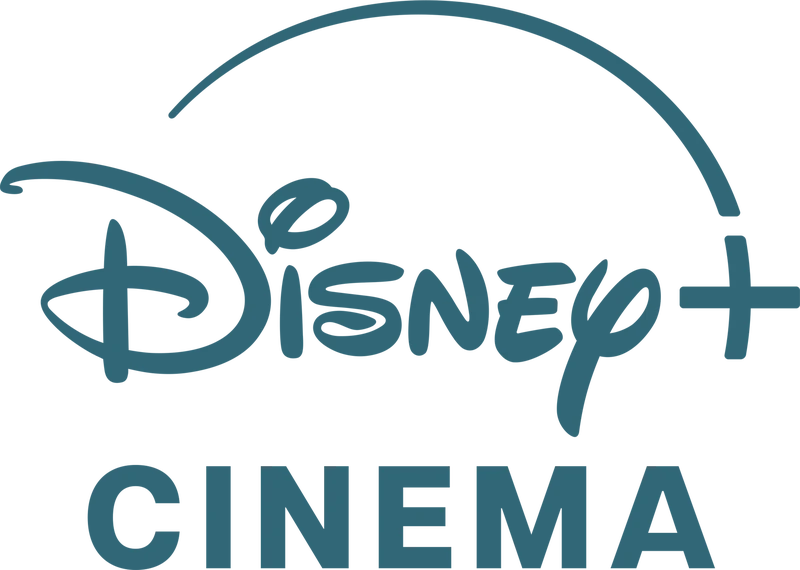
- Country: United Kingdom
- Broadcast area: United Kingdom; Ireland
- Headquarters: London, England

Programming
- Picture format: 1080i and 16:9

Ownership
- Owner: Sky Group (Comcast), The Walt Disney Company
- Sister channels: List of Sky UK channels

History
- Launched: 17 March 2026; 7 months ago

Links
- Website: www.sky.com/tv/cinema

Availability

Streaming media
- Sky Go: Watch live (UK & Ireland only)

Disney+ Cinema is a British and Irish subscription television channel operated by Sky Group in partnership with The Walt Disney Company. The channel launched on 17 March, 2026, on Sky channel 305 and is available to Sky Cinema subscribers at no additional cost. It broadcasts a curated selection of films from Disney’s catalogue, including titles from Disney, Pixar, Marvel, Star Wars and 20th Century Studios, serving as a linear showcase of content also available on Disney+.

Disney+ Cinema was introduced as part of a broader initiative by Sky to integrate key streaming services into its television offerings. From the same date, eligible new and existing Sky customers began receiving a Disney+ Standard with Ads subscription included within their Sky TV package or could apply an equivalent saving against higher Disney+ tiers, aligning linear and streaming access to Disney content under a single billing experience.

The channel complements Sky Cinema’s existing portfolio by providing a dedicated outlet for Disney’s theatrical and franchise films on linear television and reflects ongoing collaboration between Sky and Disney to enhance the availability of Disney’s film library across both traditional broadcast and on‑demand platforms.

=== Former ===
307	Sky Cinema Disney	31 December 2020
312	Sky Cinema Animation	30 April 2026

==== Sky Cinema Disney ====
Sky Cinema Disney
- Final logo used from 2017 to 31 December 2020
- Country: United Kingdom
- Broadcast area: United Kingdom, Ireland
- Headquarters: Chiswick, England

Programming
- Language: English
- Picture format: HDTV 1080i; SDTV 576i

Ownership
- Owner: The Walt Disney Company Limited; Disney Channels Worldwide (Walt Disney Direct-to-Consumer & International); Sky plc
- Sister channels: Disney Channel; Disney Junior; Disney XD

History
- Launched: 29 September 2000; 26 years ago
- Closed: 31 December 2020; 5 years ago
- Replaced by: Disney+ (films), Sky Cinema Pop-Up (channel)
- Former names: Toon Disney (2000–2006); Disney Cinemagic (2006–2013); Sky Movies Disney (2013–2016)

Toon Disney was launched in the UK on 29 September 2000. The channel was rebranded as Disney Cinemagic on 16 March 2006. It rebranded to Sky Movies Disney on 28 March 2013 and then to Sky Cinema Disney in 2016. The channel closed on 31 December 2020 with content moving to Disney+.

== Original productions ==
Sky Cinema has a dedicated production team that produces over 100 hours of original film-related programming each year – including Sky Cinema News and The Top Ten Show. In addition, Sky's close relationships with the film studios means it regularly gets exclusive access for on-set to talenting one-off 'making-ofs' and various talent-based programming.

In 1998, Elisabeth Murdoch (who was BSkyB's director of channels and services at the time) advocated Sky setting up a film funding and production unit (similar to BBC Film and Film4 Productions). The result was Sky Pictures, which existed in order to investing both low-budget and mainstream British films. However, following a lack of success and her decision to leave Sky and set up her own production company called Shine, the unit was scaled back and closed in 2001.

In January 2018, Sky announced a partnership with film distributor Altitude Film Distribution, with the launch of Sky Cinema Original Films, this new brand would distribute films for Sky Cinema's on-demand service, as well as release them into cinemas. The first film under the new banner was the United Kingdom release of the 2017 animated film Monster Family. Other films like The Hurricane Heist, Anon, Final Score, Extremely Wicked, Shockingly Evil and Vile have also been released with theatrical releases for May December, The Beekeeper and Lee being handled by StudioCanal UK and the theatrical release Ferrari being handled by Black Bear UK.

== See also ==
- Starview
- Premiere
- Home Video Channel
- Turner Classic Movies
- Carlton Cinema
