= Premiere (TV channel) =

Former pan-European subscription movie channel (1984–1989)

- Country: United Kingdom
- Broadcast area: Europe

Ownership
- Owner: Maxwell Communication Corporation (30%); British Telecom (30%); HBO; Viacom; 20th Century Fox; Columbia Pictures

History
- Launched: 1 September 1984
- Closed: 31 July 1989

Premiere (also known as PREM1ERE on air) was launched on 1 September 1984 as the first subscription movie channel that broadcast to Europe via satellite alongside the other services of that time including Sky Channel, Music Box and The Children's Channel. During its short lifespan, it absorbed two other movie channels, Mirrorvision and Star Channel. Low viewing figures and increasing competition led to the closure of the channel in July 1989.

== History ==
Premiere was launched on 1 September 1984 on cable networks in the United Kingdom and on satellite across Europe. It styled itself as the "No.1 Movie Channel".

=== The Entertainment Network ===
Mirrorvision
Ownership
- Owner: Maxwell Communication Corporation

History
- Launched: 29 March 1984 (as The Entertainment Network); 5 June 1985 (as Mirrorvision)
- Closed: 4 June 1985 (as The Entertainment Network); 1 April 1986 (as Mirrorvision)
- Replaced by: Premiere
- Former names: The Entertainment Network (29 March 1984 – 4 June 1985)

The Entertainment Network – also known as TEN and The Movie Channel – launched in the UK on 29 March 1984 by Czechoslovak-born British media proprietor Robert Maxwell. It was jointly owned by UIP Pay TV Group (MGM/UA, Paramount and MCA/Universal), Visionhire, Plessey and The Rank Organisation. It was developed in-house by Rediffusion Cablevision and was available exclusively as part of their fledgling cable service.

The station went bust in June 1985, ending its transmission at midnight on Tuesday, 4 June 1985. It was re-launched the following afternoon, once again by Robert Maxwell, under the moniker MirrorVision.

=== MirrorVision ===
MirrorVision was a film channel from the stable of the Daily Mirror launched on Wednesday, 5 June 1985. It lasted less than ten months before merging with Premiere on 1 April 1986. By the time of its closure, it was only available on Rediffusion's cable service.

=== Star Channel ===
Star Channel
Ownership
- Owner: British Telecom

History
- Launched: August 1986
- Closed: July 1987
- Replaced by: Premiere

Star Channel was started by British Telecom in August 1986 as an alternative film service which broadcast between 6.30pm and 2.00am. It was distributed to several cable operators on videotape form rather than by satellite.

Discussions on a merger between the film services were begun and concluded with Premiere, Star Channel and Home Video Channel all now being programmed within a reconstructed partnership but the channel continued as a separate service for the time being.

In July 1987, the expected closure of Star Channel took place following its merger with Premiere, thereby reducing the remaining film services to include Bravo and Home Video Channel.

=== Demise ===
Due to losses of around £10 million and increased competition from Sky Movies and BSB's upcoming The Movie Channel, Premiere closed on 31 July 1989. It was not available on Astra's satellites, from where Sky was transmitting its new direct-to-home service to the UK. The final film shown was 1985's Twice in a Lifetime, followed by a final announcement thanking the viewers as well as a few businesses that helped with Premiere's transmission.

== Programming ==
In addition to movies, the service also showed children's television programmes in an after school slot as fillers. The channel premiered ThunderCats before the BBC1 launch, and Premiere was also the first channel to show Jayce and the Wheeled Warriors.

== See also ==
- List of European television stations
- Timeline of cable television in the United Kingdom
- Starview
- The Movie Channel
- Carlton Cinema
- Film4
- Filmnet
- Teleclub
- V Film (formerly TV 1000)
