= Telecential =

Telecential was a cable TV provider based in Hemel Hempstead, Hertfordshire. It was notable for running one of the first community-based TV stations, West Herts TV, and for developing cable television services in Reading, Berkshire. Later on, they expanded their network to Bletchley now a part of Milton Keynes Borough, though since the network has lain abandoned as of 2019, it is unclear if it was ever switched on; Northamptonshire (through their acquisition of County Cable) and Swindon (through their acquisition of Swindon Cable). Telecential was jointly owned by CUC Broadcasting Ltd. and Telus.

== Timeline of consolidation ==
- Telecential were bought by Comtel with its HQ in Wokingham
- Comtel were bought by Cabletel with its HQ in Hook, Hampshire
- Cabletel rebranded as NTL
- NTL merged with Telewest branded as ntl: Telewest
- ntl: Telewest bought Virgin Mobile and, separately, re-branded as Virgin Media
- Virgin Media was later acquired by Liberty Global in 2013. Liberty Global was a successor to TCI, one of the founders of Telecential, bringing the consolidation full-circle.
