= TV3 (Medford, Massachusetts) =

Public-access station

- MCC's 2011 logo
- Country: United States
- Broadcast area: Medford, MA; Worldwide (online)
- Headquarters: 5 High Street; Medford, MA USA

Programming
- Language: English
- Picture format: 480i SDTV

Ownership
- Owner: Medford Community Cablevision, Inc.

History
- Launched: 1986
- Former names: TV3 Medford; Channel 3 Medford

Links
- Website: MCC Homepage

Availability

Streaming media
- Comcast POV: Made In Medford
- Discover Video: PEG Central

TV3, owned and operated by Medford Community Cablevision, Inc., is a public-access television channel serving Medford, Massachusetts. It was created by mandate of the 1984 Cable Franchise Policy and Communications Act. The channel's current facilities are located at 5 High Street, under then-U.S. Representative (and present-day United States Senator) Ed Markey's office in Medford Square. Medford Community Cablevision oversees the community's public access television on Comcast channel 3. It functions as both a production facility as well as a telecast station. In 2010 the station unveiled new services to the community including video on demand and 24/7 streaming video services on its website.

Medford Community Cablevision has been recognized by the Alliance for Community Media in 2008 and 2011 for "Overall Excellence in Public Television". In June 2011, the station announced Medford Cable News, the city's first non-profit broadcast news station.

== History ==
TV3 is an independent corporation contracted by the city to provide public cable access. It is funded with 1% of Comcast's Medford revenue. Community Cablevision, Inc. is run by a thirteen seat Board of Directors of whom four are elected by the station's paid membership, one is appointed by the Mayor, and the other seven are appointed by existing board members. Some board members serve for many years. The station was founded in 1984.

In the 2000s, critics accused the station of being controlled by a small cabal of insiders. In 2008, the station's General Manager Dawn Natalia resigned. In 2009, an investigating commission found that the station had produced 13 films starring board members while neglecting to broadcast a popular local parade, and recommended that the chairman of the station's board be replaced and that the station reform its finances and management; however, the commission, presided over by a retired judge, was not empowered to make legally binding rulings.

== Programming ==
Over the decades, TV3 Medford has had programming including game shows, movie review, talk radio, entertainment, music, religion, finance, and politics. In 2010, the station added multi-language programming in Spanish, Portuguese, French, and Russian.

From 2009 to 2011, TV3 Medford featured a children's television block that ran weekdays and weekends from 7 a.m. to 10 a.m.

The 2007 program Energy Smackdown was a reality game show in which three Medford families competed to reduce home energy use.

The station also airs syndicated programs such as Hot & Cold, Saturday Fright Special, and syndicated programs created by Robert Greenwald.

=== Notable guests ===
Deric Dyer playing the sax.

In 2010, the original program Inside the Music, produced by saxophonist Deric Dyer, featured musician and former SNL singer Christine Ohlman. Deric Dyer has been associated with Tina Turner and Joe Cocker for more than two decades.

Long-running controversial late-night show Zapp TV, hosted by Gary Zappelli was first broadcast live on 40 Canal Street in Medford. Since then, the show has tackled many local and mainstream topics. Other notable guests included politician Joseph L. Kennedy.

Diamond Dunhill, Gary Zappelli, Joseph L. Kennedy.

The third sports program to air on TV3, Real Grass Real Heroes, hosted by sports writer and television announcer Jim Tuberosa, features sports figures and sports writers from many generations. In 2010, the program welcomed WBZ-TV sportscaster Bob Lobel, long-time sports announcer and former 1960s Baltimore Colts executive, Upton Bell, pro ice hockey player Rick Middleton, and world welterweight boxing champion Tony DeMarco.

=== Controversial program ===
On April 8, 2010, the one-run program Dirty Talk Live: Sex Advice, and Naughty Stories aired on TV3 at 8:00 p.m. and sparked controversy among residents, politicians, and local media. The program was a live call-in format featuring a sex therapist, a panel of young adults, and a dominatrix. The program was uncensored and unedited which led to TV3 being called out for lewdness. On the screen, there was a still image of two "scantily clad" women kissing. In the corner of the screen, "they had a picture of a squirrel standing erect with a part of the male anatomy sticking out"; audio of two women discussing sexual matters played over the image on the screen.

Medford Council President Robert Maiocco claimed "It was flat-out pornographic. This wasn't just regular locker room talk, it was obscene. It's what even the Supreme Court has ruled as being pornographic." Councilor Robert Penta in a rage shouted over a City Council Meeting to the TV3 management that "you are sick to allow that to be broadcast over Channel 3." TV3's Director of Operations Daniel Sarno defended the content of the program, telling Fox News "anything that is protected under the First Amendment is fair game on public access television". The media attention lasted approximately one week.
