= C9TV =

Northern Ireland television station

c9tv

Ownership
- Owner: U C Business Ltd

History
- Launched: 17 October 1999

Links
- Website: www.c9tv.tv

Availability

Terrestrial
- Analogue: usually tuned to channel 6 or channel 9 in Derry, Limavady, Coleraine and Strabane

C9TV (Channel 9 Television) was a local television station based in Derry, Northern Ireland. The station's licences were awarded by the ITC (now Ofcom) in 1996 and allowed the station to broadcast to Derry, Limavady, Coleraine and Strabane, although broadcasts would not begin until the night of 17 October 1999.

The channel’s signal also spilled into County Donegal in the Republic and could be received in the northeast of the county. Along with Belfast's NvTv, C9TV was one of two local or 'restricted' television services in Northern Ireland. C9TV would eventually cease operations after years of suspected financial trouble in 2009.

== History ==
Channel 9 Television, more informally known as "C9TV" was launched on the night of 17 October 1999 at approximately 6:30.

The network’s first ever broadcast consisted of a News On 9 bulletin, which featured Jimmy Cadden and Katrina Doherty welcoming viewers to an "important milestone" in Irish television history, with Jimmy Cadden quoting that those watching the broadcast were "witnesses to a historical event", the rest of the network’s broadcast day presumably consisted of further advertisements and local programmes.

The station broadcast from the Sheriff's Mountain UHF transmitter which is located in the Derry area located close to the Donegal border which gave the station a very wide broadcast area across the city, according to the station's 2001 Market Research, it had a potential viewership of over 250,000 people across its broadcast area which included the greater Derry City area, parts of Donegal, as well as the Strabane and Limavady areas.

Earlier on in the station's history, it broadcast a wide range of programming which catered a wide range of subjects, these included the "News On 9" programme which would become a staple of the channel, this was presented by Jimmy Cadden (from 1999-Late 2005) and Katrina Doherty (from 1999 to 2002). This programme covered significant events in the Derry area such as the 2000 opening of the City of Derry Airport as well as local events in the Derry City area such as Derry Halloween.

Other news presenters included Ross O'Sullivan (2000-c.2001) and Theresa Craig (2005–2007)

General programme presenters included Dan Clarke (who originated from Colorado, USA), Stephen Clements, Bronagh McElholm (who presented the stations weather reports during the channel's earlier period) and Frank Galligan, a former BBC Radio Foyle anchor.

Other programmes which aired on the channel included the talk show "Studio 9", which interviewed local politicians in the Derry area regarding pressing issues of the period, such as the Bloody Sunday Inquiry in 2000, as well as other local programmes such as:

- Like Later (A music themed programme targeting young adults)
- Time Was (An historical local interest feature programme)
- Agenda (A local current affairs programme)
- The Best Days (A live programme where presenters from the station would visit local primary/secondary schools)
- C9TV Sport (A sports programme which highlighted local sports events, presented by Felix Healy)

Earlier programmes on the channel included The Northwest Roadshow (which toured the northwest in search of interesting events) and "The Buzz", a programme which detailed local events in bars and clubs which was broadcast for a short period in the channel's earlier days (October 1999-Late 2000)

The station also frequently broadcast popular music videos from bands such as Oasis, Portishead and Republica to name a few during advertisements, especially during the few months of the network's existence.

Starting from approximately 2005, the station had begun to suddenly reduce its output of locally produced content, likely due to low staff as well as financial problems, during this time, well known news anchor Jimmy Cadden had left the station in October of that year and was replaced by Theresa Craig who would carry on in the news anchor position until approximately 2007.

In 2007, the station had completely stopped producing locally sourced content and only broadcast relays of Sky News 24/7, it was during this time that it emerged that the station was struggling majorly, receiving a majority of its funding from its teletext service and council grants.

At an unknown date in 2009, the channel had ceased broadcasting after exactly 10 years in operation, allegedly, the station's last broadcast consisted of further Sky News relays, before the station suddenly ceased transmissions, going off air "with a whimper".

== Identity ==
While most RSL local stations in the UK refer to themselves as "Channel 6" or "Six" or similar, the number 9 reflects the large number of stations receivable in the area. All 5 UK-wide services could be received in C9TV's transmission area, although Five coverage via analogue was weak in some parts.

The Republic of Ireland's four channels could be received (from the Holywell Hill transmitter outside Letterkenny at high power), although only 3 had launched when C9TV was being conceived (though not by the time it had launched), resulting in the channel getting ninth place.

Reports on the network's signal coverage were incredibly mixed, the networks official webpage as early as 2002 claimed that they could be received as far as the Colraine area however this does not match the reports of residents from those areas, who claimed that the network's signal was not receivable in those parts, indicating a power which was just strong enough to cover parts of greater Derry City, Donegal and Strabane.

During the final years of the network's existence, signal strength was described as greatly reduced and poor, with some areas of the city not being able to receive the channel in the period before its eventual closure.

== Ownership ==
From approximately October 1999 until sometime around 2005, the station was directed by Tony Deehan as well as his other family members who directed fields in the station such as Financial Direction (which was operated by Terry Deehan), Advertisement Scheduling (which was operated by Garvin Deehan) and Advertisement Productions (which were operated by Darren Deehan.)

At some stage around 2005, the network was taken over by businessman Alan Cummings who would direct the station during until its subsequent closure 4 years later in 2009.

The network was initially based in the Spring-Growth House area of Derry during the first few years of its operations from approximately 1999–2001, although this location was still listed on the stations webpage as late as 2003, despite having relocated to the well known Spencer Road location at some point in late 2001.

== Planned relaunch and axe ==
Soon after the network had ceased operations in 2009, the networks then owner Alan Cummings had plans to relaunch the station and relocate it from its former Spencer Road location to a much smaller studio at the University Of Ulster (Magee Campus), where it was planned that students would be involved in a heavy amount of the programme creation and production.

Changes were allegedly made to the stations former website after he had bought the station with claims of a relaunch and "Coming Soon" being present for an unspecified period. After a long period of silence, it was announced at some point around 2012 that the plans of a relaunch had been cancelled and that the station would no longer return to Derry.

The stations website, which was last majorly updated in Spring 2004, was left dormant and inactive for a few years until it was finally purchased by an unknown individual from New York, who used the station's old webpage to advertise "Verizon" mobile related services.

The website was finally taken offline sometime around 2018, but was relaunched in 2020 and currently serves as a historical and media archive of the network's existence.
