= Swindon Cable =

- Country: United Kingdom
- Broadcast area: Swindon
- Headquarters: Hawksworth Ind Est, Swindon (1984–2000)

Ownership
- Owner: Thorn EMI (part of Screen Entertainment division), British Telecom (1986); ComTel (1998–2000); NTL (2000)

History
- Launched: 11 September 1973
- Closed: 31 July 2000
- Former names: Swindon Viewpoint; The Local Channel; Swindon's Local Channel

Swindon Cable was the UK's first commercial cable TV franchise. It was originally set up by Thorn Ltd as Radio Rentals Cable Television; the local company name was later changed to Swindon Cable. As well as relaying satellite channels, it operated its own local cable TV channel known as Swindon's Local Channel. It closed permanently in 2000, after 16 years of broadcasting mostly local programming on the Wiltshire town's cable TV system.

== Early history ==
The roots of cable TV in Swindon go back to 1928, when a company called Radio Relay transmitted two audio channels on a wire that ran around the town to a relatively small number of homes. Since radio sets were not freely available and some houses did not have electricity, this was the answer to the new radio invention – a loudspeaker on the wall and a volume control.

In 1961 a new cable network was used to transmit black and white television pictures. Once again, due to general poor reception, this proved enormously popular, especially since the BBC didn't have enough transmitters to satisfy demand for the new media.

At its peak in 1969, 15,000 were paying to receive their television pictures via cable television. However, this was a relay service in the true sense – only existing terrestrial programmes could be put on the cable, and in consequence, interest in cable started to decline as more and more BBC and ITV transmitters made reception clearer. Unlike their American counterparts, the British companies were not allowed to broadcast out-of-area signals or original programmes.

In 1964, this company was acquired by Radio Rentals, which in turn became part of Thorn Electrical Industries in 1968.

== Swindon Viewpoint ==
Local programming in Swindon began life as Swindon Viewpoint on 11 September 1973, as an experiment in community television on cable TV. It was managed initially by Richard Dunn, who went on to become Head of Thames Television. This experiment started with EMI finance on the Radio Rentals cable radio and television relay network. Local people were trained to use television production equipment. Many of the programmes were 'one-off' documentaries that interested the volunteers involved, or programmes of more general public interest. The studios were in the basement of Radio Rentals' premises on Swindon's Victoria Road.

The experiment ended in 1976 when Thorn decided to cease funding the service, although it was popular and flourishing. The main reason seems to have been that the Government would not allow advertising or sponsorship. Amid much local concern, Swindon Viewpoint was sold to the public of Swindon for £1 and an elected board of directors set up to oversee it. Viewpoint thus became the first local television service that was publicly owned and managed. Programming continued successfully for the rest of the decade with a staff of around six to train the public to make programmes, and was funded by a mix of sponsorship and a Ladbrokes-operated lottery scheme (a forerunner of the National Lottery). Viewpoint's central programming strand was a magazine programme called 'Seen in Swindon'. When video programming wasn't being shown the channel broadcast an audio service known as Radio Swindon Viewpoint; the service could still only be received on a television, and during this time captions displaying local information were shown.

When the Lottery scheme ended in 1980, funding dried up and Viewpoint went into partnership with Media Arts, the public media centre in Swindon, though this partnership recognised and maintained the independence of Viewpoint. With no staff the operation was now entirely volunteer based, but nevertheless programmes continued through the 1980s. The main programme strand was called 'Access Swindon'. In the early 1990s, Media Arts was restructured and support for Viewpoint was ended. With no access to production resources, the board of directors resolved to suspend programming operations but to maintain its structure and registration as a company, pending a more favourable climate. Swindon Viewpoint has since restarted operations online where it shows selections from its archive of programmes, as well as recent material.

== Swindon Cable, The Local Channel and closure ==
Radio Rental Cable Television started the UK's first pay-per-view movie channel, 'Cinematel' in 1981; the films were also shown on a sister cable operation in Chatham, Kent. They were broadcast from studios at 14 Victoria Hill, Swindon. The signals were encoded and the service was available only to subscribers, who needed 'set-top' boxes to decode the signal.

When it was not showing films, the cable company produced some local programming. The first programmes were one-off documentaries but these were soon followed by a live news-magazine format programme called 'Scene in Swindon'. Many of these programmes were presented by Sue Stevens, who had been involved with Swindon Viewpoint and who provided the in-vision links before and after the films. The company also provided a local teletext service, with pages of film information, horoscopes, recipes, local bus times and job vacancies. The graphics were designed by David Hounsell who used the same system to produce charts and diagrams for live budget and local election programmes.

In 1985, the operation was re-branded as Swindon Cable and moved to new studios on the Hawksworth Industrial Estate. The new studios, the largest between London and Bristol, were formally opened by Prince Michael of Kent. The news programme was also renamed as part of this move and became 'Focus on Swindon', produced by Sue Stevens with presenter/reporter Trevor Cribb. The production team included Jerry Duller, Paul Langcaster, Nick Claxton, Mark Bowes and many others. The channel increased the programme's frequency from twice a week to three times a week. Thorn EMI sold its stake in the channel to British Telecom, which pulled the plug on 'Focus on Swindon' on 4 February 1986. Bought-in content, such as CBS's daytime soap The Bold and the Beautiful, replaced the local programming.

An experiment in 1987 led to the first television bingo show with cash prizes. Viewers marked their cards at home to win cash prizes as Paul Langcaster (who had also trained with Swindon Viewpoint) and Trevor Cribb drew numbers at random in 'The Homeshop Telebingo Show' from a studio dressed with goods available from the Littlewoods catalogue shopping business's retail stores.

When the sponsorship deal ended, the channel was re-launched as Swindon's Local Channel. Paul Langcaster remained as the only member of staff and was supported by a team of volunteers including Nobby Swatton and Chris Scott. There was a mix of short news, sport and one-off documentaries. The popularity and scale of the operation grew as technology improved. It eventually had a full-time staff of four and a large team of volunteers. They produced a familiar mix of programming about local sports and local news and events. The teletext operation was revamped and rebranded as the Swindon Cable Vision information service.

After a Canadian company (CUC Cablevision, owner of Trilium Cable) took the channel over, its studio was refitted. Langcaster visited Canada to make a bid for the investment in programming equipment. The funding meant the move from the Hi-band Umatic format to the latest Sony Betacam format, creating what was then the country's most modern local programming facility. Langcaster managed the channel and was joined by Ashley Heath, and together they presented news, views, entertainment, and an annual live event, the Cable Christmas Show.

In 1998, the Swindon team started producing a community news magazine programme for ComTel in Oxford on Channel 10 of the network. The programme was called 'Scene 10 – Oxford'. By this time ComTel had become the trading name as they consolidated cable companies across the UK, on the back of providing cable-based telephone services. ComTel was eventually rebranded as NTL and finally the Swindon Cable brand disappeared completely. During Swindon Cable's last week, Paul Langcaster and Ashley Heath showed excerpts from Swindon-made community television programming.

NTL (later taken over and renamed as Virgin Media) took over ComTel's franchises and announced a plan to introduce video-on-demand but that never materialised.
