= Home Video Channel =

British cable television channel

Home Video Channel (HVC) was a British cable television channel that began operating in 1985, broadcasting low-budget films between 8:00 p.m. and midnight. Film genres included horror, action, adventure, science fiction, and erotica. In 1992, a second channel, The Adult Channel, was launched by HVC's owner, Home Video Channel Limited (HVCL). It broadcast erotic films and softcore pornography.

In 1994, HVCL was acquired by Spice Networks, a television channel group owned by Playboy Enterprises. In 1998, HVCL was merged into Playboy TV UK, a Playboy subsidiary that had been broadcasting Playboy TV in the UK since 1995. Playboy TV UK ceased transmission of the HVC channel in 1999, but it continued to broadcast the Playboy TV channel on the Sky UK digital satellite platform. In 2011, Playboy TV UK was sold to Manwin (later MindGeek), and Playboy TV ceased broadcasting in the UK in 2018.

== Early years ==
The service started on 1 September 1985. It was created by Ealing Cable as one of two channels introduced to help build up content and viewership. The other was Indra Dhnush, a subscription-based Asian channel launched in May 1986 devoted to Hindi films and television programmes with some material in other Indian languages. During its early years in operation, HVC purchased many movies as cheaply as possible, making copies via low-band U-matic tapes and distributing the films to other cable operators (along with a paper-based schedule) to play within their own local cable areas using a semi-automated system.

In March 1987, HVC was sold to one of its rivals, Premiere, and the new owner continued with the channel's existing operational model including the distribution of tapes, and increased its broadcasting hours to 7:00 pm–7:00 am. In 1989, HVC was sold to a private consortium which expanded its operation by switching to a system of direct broadcast to British and European cable operators instead of sending out tapes, transmitting on the Astra satellite system.

== The Adult Channel ==

The company started a pornographic network called The Adult Channel which was launched on 31 January 1992, a satellite-delivered subscription service that feature cable-related versions of adult movies (with softcore content) and top quality erotic programmes as well as various selection of short stories from Teresa Orlowski. The Adult Channel broadcast for four hours a day commencing at midnight, and was available to approximately two million cable and four million (direct-to-home) satellite households in the United Kingdom. The Adult Channel was also broadcasting throughout continental Europe and had subscribers in over 40 countries. HVC continued to operate during the evening with its movie service showing science fiction, erotica, action, adventure and horror films (especially the uncut versions where available) during the pre-midnight period. The two services were offered to cable operators as a seamless 8.00pm to 4.00am programming service at a single package price.

In January 1995, the station transmission was moved from the Astra 1B satellite to the new Astra 1D, the channels used frequencies that were not available on the original Sky receivers as they were outside the original BSS band. Sky issued viewers with frequency shifters (known as "ADX Plus Channel Expanders") comprising small boxes as the size of a cigarette packet, with a single switch and an on/off LED circuit connected between the dish and powered by the receiver, these allowed viewers to switch manually between the Astra 1A and Astra 1D frequency bands with a difference of 250 MHz.

Several factors were believed to have contributed to this decline by the launch of two competing pornographic services in 1995 – including Television X (2 June) and Playboy TV (1 November) – to increased piracy, along with the channel's use of an Astra 1D satellite transponder. By 1997, The Adult Channel had lost subscribers and much of its market share in the United Kingdom. In an effort to address these issues in 1998, the company restructured HVC's management and instituted a change in its transponder to allow it to broadcast on the British Sky Broadcasting satellite from August 1998. The cost of the new transponder was less expensive and the changes were successful with the number of subscribers increasing. The Adult Channel was broadcast after the Sci-Fi Channel and The History Channel as two widely distributed networks. HVC also switched to the Sky encryption technology in October 1997 to curtail signal piracy. HVC also increased The Adult Channel's programming budget for 1998 with an added emphasis on European programming. The company also increased HVC's advertising budget and reallocated it to the UK DTH market in an effort to regain lost market share.

On 1 May 1999, Home Video Channel has ceased transmission after 14 years on air with only the Adult Channel continuing to broadcast afterwards.

== Spice Networks ==
In 1994, Home Video Channel Limited was acquired by Spice Networks, which expanded the distribution throughout the rest of Europe when it increased the number of authorised agents throughout Western Europe that distribute direct-to-home subscriptions through sales of smart cards. HVC entered into an agency agreement with Nuevas Estructuras Televisivas who had secured affiliation agreements in over thirty Spanish cable systems. The Adult Channel was also carried on the Canal Digital platform which served subscribers in Scandinavia, Benelux and Germany (via Deutsche Telekom) which supplied 16 million homes via cable.

In Eastern Europe, the channel was carried by cable systems in Russia, Lithuania, Estonia and Slovenia. One of the more promising programming arrangements was with Metromedia which operated cable systems in Romania and Russia. However, several of the Romanian cable systems ceased distribution of The Adult Channel as a result of the devaluation of the Romanian currency.

== Playboy TV UK ==
In May 1995, it was announced that Hugh Hefner's Playboy magazine, which had been producing Playboy TV in the United States since November 1982, would start a new British television station in partnership with Flextech (51%) and British Sky Broadcasting (30%). Playboy Enterprises chairman and chief executive officer Christie Hefner said:

Two years ago, we began selling blocks of programming to existing cable services overseas. The establishment of an overseas Playboy network was a logical step for us in our strategy for growth and we are pleased to be involved in this venture with such respected partners as TCI, Flextech and BSkyB.

David Chance, deputy managing director of British Sky Broadcasting, and Roger Luard, managing director of Flextech plc, jointly said:

Playboy has a strong brand name worldwide and has a successful adult-oriented television channel in the United States that appeals to both men and women. Our research shows there is a strong demand for the channel, with its wide variety of high quality programming in the UK and Benelux countries.

In November 1995, Playboy TV UK started broadcasting for the first time, running from 11:30 pm to 4:00 am on Mondays to Thursdays, and also from midnight on Fridays to Sundays. The channel offered a combination of programmes including live shows, comedy series, documentaries and films, as well as several well known stars including Pamela Anderson, Jenny McCarthy, Kathy Lloyd and Jo Guest.

In December 1998, HVC acquired the 81% interest in Playboy TV UK/Benelux from Flextech and British Sky Broadcasting Limited, and HVC and Playboy TV UK were subsequently merged. Playboy said that HVC would pay approximately US$9 million for the 81% interest and that the timing of the payments would be based on the network's future cash flows. Playboy TV and HVC continued to be delivered on Sky's satellite platform as well as via cable. Playboy Entertainment Group president Anthony J. Lynn said:

The economies of scale that the merger offers, combined with the ability to market attractive options to consumers, should improve our growth and profitability potential.

In February 2005, Playboy TV UK was fined by Ofcom for broadcasting Sandy Babe Abroad, a hardcore pornographic film, and said "it includes material which should not be transmitted at any time under any circumstance on British television". On 2 April 2009, the station again fined by Ofcom for breaches of its licence, by broadcasting "sexually explicit material unencrypted". In December 2011, Playboy TV UK was sold to the internet pornography company Manwin (later MindGeek) along with the rest of Spice Networks. In January 2013, Playboy TV UK was fined once again for failing to ensure that children were protected from potentially harmful pornographic material, they said "there wasn't a system in place on Playboy's on-demand programmes services and they didn't have acceptable controls in place to check that users were aged 18 or over".

Playboy TV UK was also available in Finland and Scandinavia through Canal Digital (in Norway also via Get), in Belgium through Telenet, in Switzerland through Cablecom, in Africa, and also in New Zealand through Sky Network Television. In November 2017, Sky's EPG slot was bought for the Television X Pay-Per Night service owned by Portland TV. It was unavailable on Virgin Media for two weeks but returned in mid-December 2017. The channel finally closed on Virgin Media in July 2018, with its slot being taken over by sister station XXX Brits.

On 22 January 2018, Playboy TV UK/Benelux Limited was renamed MG Global Entertainment (Europe) Limited. On 14 August 2023, the company was renamed once again to Aylo Global Entertainment (Europe) Limited.

== See also ==
- List of European television stations
- Timeline of cable television in the United Kingdom
- List of adult television channels
- Pornographic film
- Nudity in film
- Video nasty
