= Armchair 30 =

1973 British TV anthology series

- Genre: Drama Anthology
- Country of origin: United Kingdom
- No. of episodes: 10

Production
- Running time: 30 minutes
- Production company: Thames Television

Original release
- Network: ITV
- Release: 11 April – 4 December 1973

Armchair 30 is an anthology drama series of short plays produced by Thames Television and broadcast in 1973. The series was a spin-off from Armchair Theatre.

== Episodes ==
Episode Name	Date
John Sloan's Story	4 December 1973
Captain Video's Story	27 November 1973
Ross Evans' Story	20 November 1973
Jessie James' Story	29 August 1973
Simon Fenton's Story	22 August 1973
Carol's Story	15 August 1973
Alan's Story	8 August 1973
Harry Sebrof's Story	25 April 1973
Alfred Potter's Story	18 April 1973
Miss Fanshaw's Story	11 April 1973
