= Starview =

Former British premium cable television channel operated by Rediffusion (1981–1984)

Rediffusion Starview was an early premium cable television channel in the United Kingdom, operated by Rediffusion.

== History ==
=== Operation ===
The Home Office had granted several experimental licenses to broadcast subscription television services, of which Rediffusion also received licenses for five different areas – Burnley, Hull, Pontypridd, Reading and Tunbridge Wells.

Starview was the first of these services launched on 9 September 1981, with its first showing of The Sea Wolves which had been only for cinema release a year earlier. The subscription cost varied from several towns – £8 in Hull and £12 in Reading – were available around 22,000 homes served by Rediffusion's cable service, although it is illegal to copy this film onto domestic recorders (such as VHS, Betamax and Video 2000) from preventing piracy. Schedules for weekdays consisted of two daily slots (7.00pm and 9.00pm) with Fridays and Saturdays also featuring an 11.00pm slot for X-rated films, whilst Sundays offered a matinée showing at 5.00pm, as well as non-movie content for special events which include Rod Stewart's Tonight I'm Yours concert was broadcast on 1 January 1982.

Other early British cable television services started around the same time during 1981 were: Showcable (Visionhire/BBC Enterprises) on 15 October, and Cinematel (Radio Rentals/Thorn EMI) on 6 November.

=== Demise ===
Starview struggled to make a significant impact where the channel only had a 10% uptake and was dropped by five remaining towns, with The Entertainment Network replacing it on the Rediffusion cable service from 29 March 1984.

== See also ==
- Timeline of cable television in the United Kingdom
- List of former TV channels in the United Kingdom
- Sky Cinema (formerly Sky Movies)
- The Movie Channel
- Carlton Cinema
- Film4
