= Indra Dhnush =

Former Hindi-language television service in the United Kingdom

Indra Dhnush (Hindi for Rainbow), later AsiaVision, was a British cable television subscription channel aimed at the South Asian diaspora.

== History ==
The channel launched in May 1986 on the cable networks of Windsor and Slough in Berkshire, where the Asian population at the time was estimated to be at 30%. This was supplemented at the end of the year with Radio Roshni, on the Ealing network. In early 1988, Cabletel began producing some programmes for the channel at its headquarters in Greenford, and was operational from 9am to 1am. The channel later extended its coverage to Ealing's cable network; by 1991, Ealing Cabletel was the owner of the service.

Like its sister channel HVC, Indra Dhnush purchased many movies as cheaply as possible, making copies via low-band U-matic tapes and distributing the films to other cable operators (along with a paper-based schedule) to play within their own local cable areas using a semi-automated system. Because the starting times were fixed, there were gaps in programming. There was a prospective launch nationwide on satellite slated for 1992, which was never achieved. Cabletel Ealing later sold the channel to two businessmen, parting ways from HVC. The channel upgraded from a "warehouse of tapes" to a proper channel, being renamed AsiaVision in the process. Under the new name, the service was to be uplinked by satellite to 16,000 subscribing households. The channel eventually shut down in 1994 due to accumulated debts, larger than the ones expected.

== Programming ==
Indra Dhnush primarily broadcast Hindi films and television programmes with some material in other Indian languages, namely in Urdu, Gujarati, Punjabi, Tamil and Bengali. Additionally, some Doordarshan serials aired on the channel, either showing one episode or omnibuses of an existing serial.

Doordarshan serials known to have been carried by Indra Dhnush were:

- Ekas Ke Hum Barik (Punjabi)
- Chunni (Hindi)
- Bahadur Shah Zafar (Hindi)
- Nukkad (Hindi)
- Darpan (Hindi)
- Vishwamitra (Hindi)
- Buniyaad (Hindi)
- Hum Log, the first serial produced by Doordarshan (Hindi)
- King Vikram (Hindi)
- Panchi (Hindi)

By 1992, cooking shows had joined the schedule (Cooking with Korma), as well as music programmes.
