= WightFibre =

Isle of Wight telecommunications company

Wightfibre Limited
- Formerly: WightCable; Isle of Wight Cable & Telephone Company
- Type: Telecommunications
- Founded: 2001
- Headquarters: Cowes, England, UK
- Area served: Isle of Wight
- Website: wightfibre.com

WightFibre Limited is a full-fibre network operator on the Isle of Wight. WightFibre provides telephone and broadband internet services exclusively to homes and businesses on the Isle of Wight.

Historically WightFibre has operated a hybrid fibre-coaxial network (HFC) service around 25% of the Island. It was the last remaining cable company in the UK which is not part of Virgin Media, which since March 2006, has operated more than 95% of cable services in the UK. In November 2017 WightFibre secured £35M of funding from Infracapital Partners (ICP, part of M&G Investments) matched funded by private investors and the UK Governments Digital Infrastructure Fund. This funding is allowing WightFibre to upgrade its HFC network to a full-fibre (Fibre to the Premise(FTTP)) network and to extend coverage to over 50,000 homes on the island. In summer 2020 the company secured additional funding from ICP and NatWest to take total funding to over £90M to take total planned coverage to 78,000 premises.

WightFibre's Gigabit Island project commenced in autumn 2018, accelerating in January 2019. The first 35,000 homes are complete (Feb 2022) with 10,000 customers connected. The company aims to reach 60,000 homes by December 2022. Symmetrical broadband speeds of up to 900 Mb are on offer.

== Company History ==
The Isle of Wight Cable and Telephone Company (IOWCTC) was formed in 2000 and commenced offering service on the island in January 2001. IOWCTC was taken over by CLS Holdings in 2002 and rebranded to Wightcable. CLS Holdings sold the assets of Wightcable to private investors in 2005 who formed WightCable (2005) Ltd. New branding was introduced, services upgraded and internet speeds increased. When Virgin Media acquired Smallworld in 2014 this left WightFibre as the sole independent UK cable company.

In 2012, WightCable changed its name to WightFibre, promising increased internet speeds up to 100 Mbit/s, and introducing IPTV with high-definition channels and on-demand services. A £500,000 investment saw the launch of 50 Mb broadband in July 2012, 100 Mb broadband in September 2012 and 152 Mb broadband in 2013. The company advertised heavily and returned to growth in October 2012. A small scale trial of the company's new IP based TV service was held in Nov & Dec 2012 but technical difficulties and difficulties in striking content agreements led to the cancellation of the project in 2013.

In February 2013 WightFibre was acquired by Keith Young, a serial entrepreneur who was also an original investor in Easynet (which was later purchased by Sky). The management team remained in place and the company's strategy remained unchanged. Keith Young invested in the company to accelerate the turnaround. WightFibre has partnered with two Isle of Wight-based wireless operators – Click4Internet and Wight Wireless – to extend island coverage with plans to improve that coverage to provide speeds of 50 Mb to 80 Mb throughout the island. In 2015 WightFibre acquired Click4Internet.

In November 2017 WightFibre was acquired by Infracapital Partners as part of its £35M investment in the company.

In summer 2020 the company secured additional funding from ICP and NatWest to take total funding to over £90M to take total planned coverage to 78,000 premises

== Logos ==
Old logo - this logo was designed by one of the former employees, a field engineer by the name of Robert Firth in 2002. The binary numbers in the blue background read as ’This logo was designed by Rob Firth’

Former logo until 2012

Logo 2012
