= Greenwich Cablevision =

First community television station in Britain

Greenwich Cablevision was the first community television station in Britain, broadcasting in the Greenwich area of London during the 1970s. Originally set up as a way to relay TV programmes by cable to areas with poor reception due to the high ground at Shooters Hill, it began to produce its own programmes in 1972. It provided early career breaks for comedians Jim Davidson and Hale and Pace. In 1975 it was given permission to carry advertising, and in the mid-1980s it became Greenwich Cablescene.

== History ==
Greenwich Cablevision was half-owned by Canadian business interests and had Maurice Townsend as its managing director. By January 1972 it had 12,000 subscribing households, each of whom paid 15 pence per week to access its cable television service. This had originated in response to difficulties in receiving a terrestrial television signal in parts of the borough of Greenwich, notably some areas of Woolwich, most of Plumstead and Abbey Wood. These districts had poor reception caused by the location of the high point of Shooters Hill between them and the terrestrial transmitter at Crystal Palace. The company placed a television mast on a recently constructed high-rise block nearby and relayed the received terrestrial signal by cable to many local homes. The system was known as the Woolwich and District Television Traders' Relay.

The move from being a relay service to a local television station that broadcast content not provided by the BBC or Independent Television Authority (ITA) broadcasters came in 1972 after it lobbied Christopher Chataway, the then Minister of Posts and Telecommunications. It was already providing cable access to ITA terrestrial channels that were otherwise not available in the London area, such as Southern Television and Anglia Television, but Townsend expressed a desire to develop "a video platform for local people". There was a commercial imperative to seek new markets because improvements in the coverage of terrestrial transmitters were boosting the quality of reception of such signals and thus reducing the demand from consumers for cable relay services.

The revised terms were conditional upon it providing high-quality local, community-oriented programmes and continuing to operate without public funding. It had been and remained barred from showing advertisements or seeking sponsorships, and it was also prohibited from showing films. As with some similar early cable operators in the United Kingdom, Greenwich Cablevision was hoping that the incumbent Conservative Party government would in due course provide a legislative environment that permitted pay TV services to develop.

Greenwich Cablevision was the first of five stations to commence locally oriented cable broadcasts following the granting of the experimental licences, with the other awardees being based in Bristol, Sheffield, Swindon and Wellingborough. These licences were intended to expire in 1976 but their span was extended to 1979 after the election of a Labour government in 1974.

With a subscriber base now standing at 14,000 and a staff of seven, Greenwich began its revised operations in July 1972, working from a former shop in Plumstead High Street. Its chairman, Timothy Dudman, noted that "People like to see themselves and their friends on TV - it is natural and this, combined with a strong local interest, should make for good viewing." Initially, the in-house programming comprised a magazine-format current affairs show presented by Jillie Murphy, a local woman and former fashion writer. Called Cabletown, it had similarities with the Nationwide terrestrial programme, was broadcast daily for an hour in the evening and then repeated the following morning. Later efforts included a Saturday night show called Greenwich Meantime that provided early career breaks for the comedians Jim Davidson and Hale and Pace, and a series called Your Song that featured a broadcast of community hymn-singing.

The company had estimated in 1972 that it needed 17,000 subscribers from its 20,000 connected households in order to break even, and that it would then be able to consider adding a further 14,000 households to its cable network. Townsend's concerns regarding local programming were more inspired by a desire to increase the number of people taking up the company's service than by the spirit of localism and democratisation as embodied by Michael Shamberg and other media activists of the time. The services provided by Bristol Channel and Swindon Viewpoint favoured the latter emphasis and aimed to involve their viewers in production of their output. However, by 1975 only Greenwich Cablevision, Sheffield Cablevision and the Swindon broadcaster were still operating; the others among the initial five licensees had been unable to survive in the constrained financial framework, which had also prevented them from increasing the price of subscriptions. (Note: Although Allen and Miller state that only the Greenwich and Swindon broadcasters were still operating in 1975, contemporary news reports indicate that Sheffield Cablevision did not cease broadcasting until 2 January 1976.) The various broadcasters had wanted permission to seek subsidies from local councils, to use their spare channel capacity to sell CCTV monitoring facilities and to show sponsored material. Instead came a government decision in 1975 to allow them to carry advertising. This concession followed pressure from the Annan Committee which feared that the entire experiment might collapse before it had time to review evidence of their impact. At that time, the New Scientist commented that the additional revenue would be insufficient to offset the operating costs especially since the small audiences and often "dull or amateurish" programming would deter advertisers. Earlier in that year, Greenwich had cut its locally generated programming to two hours per week, while the Swindon operation refused to countenance advertising, believing that it was contrary to their public service ethos.

Writing in The Guardian, columnist Peter Fiddick considered the decision to extend the licensing period from 1976 to 1979 as no more than governmental procrastination, putting off the time when politicians would determine the outcome of the experiment. He said that "the commercial decision the cable interests are having to take is whether continuing to shell out on the community experiments in the public interest will in the end, after Annan and all that, bring the multi-channel pay television, full-colour advertising backed, share of the mass audience business that is the real goal."

A contemporary documentary produced for the BBC's Horizon programme portrayed the activities of the Greenwich and Swindon broadcasters.

Greenwich Cablevision became Greenwich Cablescene in the mid-1980s.

== See also ==
- List of former TV channels in the United Kingdom
- Television in the United Kingdom
