= Channel One (British cable network) =

UK network of local cable news channels

Channel One was a network of local cable news channels owned by Daily Mail and General Trust, a press conglomerate. Starting in London on 30 November 1994, the channel later started separate channels for Bristol and Liverpool. In 1998 DMGT shut down two of its channels while selling the Liverpool channel, which remained on air under new ownership until 2002.

== History ==
The Associated Newspapers launched Channel One in London on 30 November 1994, becoming the first local channel to start broadcasting at a local level. The network employed thirty street-based one-man journalist crews at launch. Breakfast programming consisted of "fast coverage" of news and traffic, daytime programming consisting of rolling news and magazine programmes, and the late afternoon consisted of planning for the evening's travel and entertainment. Much of the coverage was live, in order to cover key local events. As a basic cable channel, it claimed a potential audience of 300,000 viewers, coupled with the London area having 40% of the cable network (being a heavily cabled city) at the time of its launch. In June 1995, the channel gained the rights to air two-and-a-half hours of Wimbledon highlights during the run of that year's tournament, giving overall a three-year period of secondary rights. It also announced that one of its programmes, Digital World became the first programme to be streamed online, limited to still pictures, with the hopes of adding audio. Within less than a year from launch, Channel One London had gained high ratings, ahead of Sky News but behind the four terrestrial channels.

In June 1995, Channel One announced the creation of its second outlet covering Bristol and Bath. Associated Newspapers had interests in the region, owning two newspapers: the Western Morning News and Bristol Evening Post. The channel launched on 1 February 1996, covering 50,000 households served by United Artists' cable TV service.

Although Channel One was doing well in its programming, its revenues did not increase by 1996, due to a lower-than-expected number of subscribers. In September 1997, Channel One London teamed up with the Press Association to reformulate it as a "truly local" service, recruiting five of its journalists.

On 2 September 1998, DMGT announced the closure of its two operations owned entirely by the conglomerate, in London and Bristol, while the station in Liverpool, partially owned by the Trinity Group, continued operations. DMGT announced that the number of cable subscribers wasn't scheduled to break even by the end of the 10-year period in its licence (which was scheduled to end in 2004). The news came after the death of Viscount Rothermere, the owner's chairman, the day prior. The final news bulletin on Channel One London aired at 5pm on 25 September 1998, followed at 5:30pm by a compilation of footage aired by the channel.

Channel One Liverpool, which started in 1996, shut down at 12pm on 30 October 2002, bringing a definitive end to the network. Its 22 staff were searching for new jobs at the company's newspaper division. There was a plan to save the channel but Telewest halted its annual payments to Channel One.
