= Bristol Channel (TV channel) =

Cable TV broadcaster

Bristol Channel was a cable television broadcaster that operated in the Bristol area of England during a period of experimental licensing of cable community television in the 1970s. It was run by Rediffusion and existed from 17 May 1973 to March 1975.

Its programming line-up at launch included the UK's first ever regular breakfast television programme. Its launch schedule also included Teleidoscope: local entertainments, what's on, arts and crafts, film and theatre local music groups; Help: a citizen's advice bureau; Cross Channel; programming made by young people in subjects of their choice; Pastime: out-of-the-ordinary hobbies, unusual sports and occupations and various weekend activities and a studio discussion show called Broad Plain Speaking.

== See also ==
- List of former TV channels in the United Kingdom
- Television in the United Kingdom
