= CLS Holdings =

Property company of the United Kingdom

CLS Holdings plc
- Company type: Public
- Traded as: LSE: CLI; FTSE 250 component
- Industry: Property
- Founded: 1987 as Central London Securities
- Headquarters: London, England, United Kingdom
- Key people: Lennart Sten (Independent Non-Executive Chairman); Anna Seeley (Non-Executive Director and Vice Chairman); Fredrik Widlund (Chief Executive Officer); Andrew Kirkman (Chief Financial Officer)
- Revenue: ▼£139.7 million (2025)
- Operating income: ▲£(24.1) million (2025)
- Net income: ▲£(50.3) million (2025)
- Website: www.clsholdings.com

CLS Holdings plc is a British commercial property investment business based in London, England. It is listed on the London Stock Exchange, and specialises in office space across the United Kingdom, Germany and France.

== History ==
The company was established by Sten Mörtstedt as Central London Securities in 1987 and was first listed on the London Stock Exchange in 1994. The company was one of the original three investors in The Shard development at London Bridge in 2006 but sold its interest in January 2008. Richard Tice was appointed CEO in 2010.

Fredrik Widlund replaced Richard Tice as CEO in November 2014, having previously been at GE Capital.

Historically, the company made shareholder distributions by way of a tender offer buy-back, but announced in February 2017 the introduction of a dividend, and a proposed share sub-division.

The former executive director Sten Mörtstedt died in December 2020 at the age of 80.

== Operations ==
The company's property portfolio was valued at circa £1.6 billion as at 31 December 2025.
