= Community television =

Community television is a form of mass media in which a television station is owned, operated or programmed by a community group to provide television programs of local interest known as local programming.

Community television stations are most commonly operated by non-profit groups or cooperatives. However, in some cases they may be operated by a local college or university, a cable company or a municipal government.

== Community television by country ==
=== Bangladesh ===
Bangladesh NGOs Network for Radio and Communication is promoting the advocacy with the government in relations to community Television with other organizations since its emergence from 2011. BNNRC has been addressing the Community Television access issue for over a decade, helping to bridge the information gap in Bangladesh

=== Brazil ===
In Brazil, in the 1980s, it appeared as a Free TV, also called Street TV, characterized by the production of educational-cultural videos for exhibition in a closed circuit or in public square, as a proposal of the struggles for redemocratization of the country. Today, a community television are operated across by Conditional Access Service (pay-TV), a public concession for free use by nongovernmental entities, in the cable TV system or in the Citizenship Channel (in terrestrial digital TV). There are about 90 TVs. Each television is formed by an association of entities. It is a channel provided for in Brazilian laws: No. 8977/1995 and No. 12485/2011.

=== Canada ===
Most community channels in Canada are owned and operated by cable companies, as a requirement of license imposed by the Canadian Radio-television and Telecommunications Commission (CRTC). However, due to the state of concentration of media ownership in Canada, whereby the vast majority of Canada's conventional television stations are now owned by national media conglomerates and offer very little locally oriented programming, terrestrial community channels began to emerge in the 2000s in many smaller markets not directly served by their own commercial television stations. Community channels of this latter type are generally operated by local non-profit groups.

=== Indonesia ===
Since late 2002, community television in Indonesia is regulated as Community Broadcasting Institution (Indonesian: Lembaga Penyiaran Komunitas or LPK). One of the oldest local TV channels in Indonesia, Publik Khatulistiwa TV, first originated as a community television before it became a limited company in 2001.

=== Ireland ===
Community television is in its infancy in Ireland. Licensing is administered by the Broadcasting Authority of Ireland. Saorview launched on 31 October 2010 giving an addition platform for Community television, however so far Community TV is only available on UPC's Irish cable and Multichannel Multipoint Distribution Service (MMDS) network. The main broadcasters are P5TV (UPC 801), Cork Community TV (UPC 802) and DCTV (UPC 803). These groups produce content and then they can have it transmitted by an organisation that has a license to broadcast (terrestrial television or cable television).

As well as the above, there are also web based channels which are likely to become more dominant in the not too distant future as broadband coverage and quality improves (and as the technologies converge). Examples of these are Teilifis Gaeltacht Muscrai (TGM) based in the rural Irish speaking WestCork Gaeltacht, and Fingal Community TV based in Dublin.

=== Singapore ===
Singapore briefly had community television in the 1990s through the launch of Singapore Cable Vision (SCV). In 1994, SCV plans to have a "City TV" community channel in their cable network in the long term. Aimed to create a "strong sense of belonging to local communities" among Singaporeans, community channels were still planned in 1995. The channels would also "increase neighbourhood security" by monitoring the "goings-on" of nearby areas such as neighbourhood centres, public parks and carparks with the help of town councils, resident councils and community centres. However, one of Singapore's political parties, the National Solidarity Party, warned against the usage of community channels, increasing viewer perceptions of Singapore being a police state and cause mistrust between authorities and people.

An experimental community channel aimed at 50,000 households connected to SCV in Tampines and Pasir Ris was tested on 5 May 1996, in conjunction with the opening of the Tampines East Community Club. Provided by SCV, the channels were produced by ten three-year undergraduates from the Nanyang Technological University's School of Technological Studies. Singapore becomes the first country in South East Asia to have community television. Community channels also obeyed to the same rules as conventional channels.

=== United Kingdom ===
Probably the longest standing community television service in the UK is Swindon Viewpoint, which is over 40 years old. It claims to operate according to the "core community TV principles of access and accountability", and its board is elected by its public. For a list of other channels, see the related category page.

=== United States ===
Public, educational and government access television is a form of non-commercial mass media where ordinary people can create content which can be viewed through cable TV systems. Standard public-access television is often grouped with Educational-access television and Government-access television (GATV) channels, by the acronym PEG. PEG Channels are typically only available on cable television systems.
