= Wellingborough Cablevision =

Experimental cable TV in England

Wellingborough Cablevision was a cable television broadcaster that operated in the Wellingborough area of Northamptonshire, England, during a period of experimental licensing of cable community television in the 1970s. It was run by a consortium of local businesses and existed from 18 February 1974 to 24 March 1975.

== See also ==
- List of former TV channels in the United Kingdom
- Television in the United Kingdom
