= Sheffield Cablevision =

Ownership
- Owner: British Relay Wireless

History
- Launched: 29 August 1973
- Closed: 2 January 1976

Sheffield Cablevision was a cable television community channel in Sheffield, England which launched on 29 August 1973. The channel was one of five community cable television experiments that were authorised by the UK's Minister for Posts and Telecommunications in 1972. It closed on 2 January 1976 due to lack of funds. (Note: Although Allen and Miller state that only the Greenwich and Swindon broadcasters were still operating in 1975, contemporary news reports indicate that Sheffield Cablevision did not cease broadcasting until 2 January 1976.)
