= Swindon Viewpoint =

Television channel in Swindon, Wiltshire, England

Swindon Viewpoint is a local community TV channel based in, and serving Swindon. In more than half a century of history, it has been through several incarnations; including its early experimental cable TV phase, its main phase in the 1970s and 1980s, its 1990s low key phase, and its current active online phase since 2000.

== History ==
Swindon Viewpoint began broadcasting on 11 September 1973 as an experiment in community cable television, or public-access television. It was initially run by Richard Dunn, who later went on to become head of Thames Television. The experiment started with EMI finance on the Radio Rentals cable radio and television relay network. Local people could train in television programme making by using its television production equipment. Many of its programmes were 'one-off' documentaries that interested the volunteers involved or programmes of more general public interest. The first studios were in the basement of Radio Rentals' premises in Swindon's Victoria Road then later in the Town Hall Arts Studios.

The experimental phase ended in 1976 when EMI decided to pull out of funding the service, even though it was considered very popular and appeared to be flourishing. The main reason seems to have been that the government would not allow advertising or sponsorship. After much local protest, Swindon Viewpoint was sold to the public of Swindon for £1 and an elected board of directors set up to oversee it. Viewpoint thus became the first television service that was publicly owned and managed. Programming continued for the rest of the decade with a staff of around six to train the public to make programmes, and was funded by a mix of sponsorship and a Ladbrokes operated lottery scheme, a forerunner of the National Lottery. Viewpoint's central programming strand was a magazine-based programme called Seen in Swindon There were also regular Arts and Music programmes showcasing local creativity.

When the lottery scheme ended in 1980, funding dried up and the service faced closure. To save the service, Martin Parry took the helm as Chairman of the Directors and Viewpoint went into partnership with Media Arts, the public media centre in Swindon, placing its TV production equipment there, (though this partnership recognised and maintained the independence of Viewpoint). With no staff the operation was now entirely volunteer based, but nevertheless flourished through the 1980s. Its main programme strand was called Access Swindon. In the early 1990s Media Arts was restructured by the council and funding for Viewpoint was withdrawn. With no access to its owned production resources the board of directors resolved to suspend regular programming operations but maintain Viewpoint's structure and registration as a company, pending a more favourable climate. Broadcasting stopped temporarily at the end of April 1990, but continued intermittently with programmes made by volunteers over the next decade, and other forms of distribution such as VHS tape and screening in community venues were used.

The service once again saw a rebirth after the millennium with many programmes made and distributed through the internet, and the station now operates as an online community TV station at its website (this website currently may be broken and funding is being sought to rebuild it), where it has current material and a selection from its archive of programmes, available for online streaming. A large selection of its programming is also available on https://vimeo.com/swindonviewpoint (several thousand productions). Viewpoint also uses social media to distribute its programming. Viewpoint continues to offer help, training and support to local people to enable them to make programmes and have their voices heard.

== Legacy ==
The station has been seen as unique in a number of ways; it is Britain's (and probably Europe's) first and longest running public-access television service, and is also notable for being owned by the public from its early years.
