= Bristol News =

Television series

- Genre: Local news
- Countries of origin: England, United Kingdom
- Original language: English

Production
- Production locations: Abbey Wood Business Park, Filton, Bristol
- Camera setup: Multi-camera
- Production company: Made Television

Original release
- Network: Made in Bristol
- Release: 8 October 2014 – 17 November 2017

Bristol News (branded on air as #BristolNews) is a local television news and current affairs service, broadcast between 2014 and 2017, covering the city of Bristol, England and the surrounding areas. The service was produced by Made in Bristol and broadcast from studios at Abbey Wood Business Park in Filton between 2014 and 2017.

== Timeline ==
The service originally aired as a twice-nightly programme called The 6 and The 9, carrying news stories from the Bristol area, as opposed to the broader regional news services provided by BBC West and ITV West Country. The programme was rebranded as Bristol News on 5 April 2016.

In February 2017, the weekday programme was replaced by shorter updates aired during the live magazine programme, The Crunch Bristol, each weeknight from 6pm to 8pm. A half-hour weekly review programme continued to air on Saturdays and Sundays at 6pm.

In November 2017, following a restructuring of the Made Television network's operations, The Crunch Bristol was axed and local production was cut. A replacement programme, Made TV News – combining local and national news stories – was produced from Leeds. This was axed in February 2018 in favour of Bristol Live, a rolling block of pre-recorded news, sport and features produced by local videojournalists.
