= Local TV =

Local Television or Local TV may refer to:

- Local TV LLC, a 20-station television group in the United States later owned by Tribune Broadcasting
- Local Television Limited, formerly Made Television, a group of 8 local stations in the United Kingdom
- Local television in the United Kingdom
- a local television blackout, the non-airing of television or radio programming in a certain media market
