= Liverpool Today =

- Also known as: 'Liverpool This Week'
- Genre: Local news
- Countries of origin: England, United Kingdom
- Original language: English

Production
- Production locations: Toxteth TV, Toxteth, Liverpool
- Camera setup: Multi-camera
- Production company: Made Television

Original release
- Network: Made in Liverpool
- Release: 19 October 2016 – 17 November 2017

Related
- BBC North West Tonight; ITV News Granada Reports

Liverpool Today is a local television news and current affairs programme, broadcast between October 2016 and November 2017, serving Liverpool and Merseyside. Produced by Made in Liverpool, the programme was broadcast from studios at Toxteth TV in the Toxteth suburb of Liverpool.

== Overview ==
Made in Liverpool's news operation began in December 2014 as part of the newly launched Bay TV - the station aired a rolling service of short local news bulletins throughout the day until October 2016, when Bay TV was brought by Made Television after falling into administration.

Bay TV's news output was revamped and relaunched on Wednesday 19 October 2016 as a twice-nightly half-hour programme on weeknights entitled Liverpool Today. The programme focused exclusively on local news stories from Liverpool and surrounding areas, as opposed to the broader regional news services provided by BBC North West and ITV Granada. Following the launch of sister station Made in North Wales, reporters and presenters were occasionally shared with that station's counterpart North Wales News.

In November 2017, following a restructuring of the Made network's operations, Liverpool Today was axed and local production was cut. A replacement programme, Made TV News - combining local and national news stories - was produced from Leeds but axed in February 2018 in favour of Merseyside Live, a rolling block of pre-recorded news, sport and features produced by local videojournalists.

Liverpool Today on-air team

Person	Role	Duration
Emily Bonner	Main presenter	October 2016 - November 2017
Charlene Smith	Liverpool This Week presenter / News Editor	October 2016 - November 2017
Dan Bates	Relief presenter / Reporter	October 2016 - November 2017
Nathan Archer	Relief presenter (shared with North Wales News)	April - November 2017
Nathan Griffiths	Relief presenter / Reporter	October 2016 - August 2017
Peter Berry	Presenter / News Editor	October - December 2017
