= On the Aire =

2014 English television news program

- Also known as: 'Weekend On the Aire'
- Genre: Local news
- Countries of origin: England, United Kingdom
- Original language: English

Production
- Production locations: Leeds Media & Broadcasting Centre, Chapeltown, Leeds
- Camera setup: Multi-camera
- Running time: 30 minutes
- Production company: Made Television

Original release
- Network: Made in Leeds
- Release: 6 November 2014 – 17 November 2017

Related
- BBC Look North; ITV News Calendar

On the Aire is a local television news and current affairs programme, serving Leeds and surrounding areas. Produced by Made in Leeds, the programme was produced and broadcast from studios at the Leeds Media Centre in the Chapeltown area of the city.

== Overview ==
First broadcast on the opening night of local TV station Made in Leeds, On the Aire focused exclusively on local news stories from Leeds and the surrounding areas, as opposed to the broader regional news services provided by BBC Yorkshire and ITV Yorkshire.

The programme was first presented by Jason Thornton, and later, Mark Kielesz-Levine. Reporters and video journalists included Peter McNerney, Matt Millington, Joe Robinson, Andy Seddon and Kristian Johnson.

On The Aire was one of the first local news programmes to mount live outside broadcast specials, including coverage of the murder of Batley and Spen MP Jo Cox, the Leeds 2016 Olympic and Paralympic parade and from Manchester after the Manchester Arena bombing.

In November 2017, following a restructuring of the Made Television network's operations, On the Aire was axed and news production for all of Made's local stations was centralised at the Leeds studios. The station produced Made TV News, combining local and national news stories but the programme was axed in February 2018.

Made in Leeds now airs Yorkshire Live, a rolling block of pre-recorded news, sport and features produced by local videojournalists.

== Awards ==
In June 2016, On the Aire won Best News Report at the Royal Television Society's Yorkshire Awards for its coverage of Christmas flooding in Leeds. The programme was also nominated for News Programme of the Year, while reporters Mark Kielesz-Levine and Matt Millington were nominated for Reporter of the Year.

In June 2017, On The Aire was again nominated at the Royal Television Society's Yorkshire Awards for Best News or Current Affairs Story on its coverage of the murder of Jo Cox MP, whilst Mark Kielesz-Levine and Joe Robinson were nominated in the category of Best News or Current Affairs Reporter. Kielesz-Levine won the Reporter of the Year award the following month.
