= Local TV Birmingham =

Local TV station in the English West Midlands

Birmingham TV
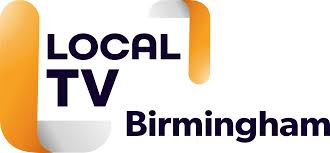
- Country: United Kingdom
- Broadcast area: Birmingham, the Black Country, Wolverhampton, Solihull

Programming
- Picture format: 576i (16:9 SDTV)

Ownership
- Owner: Local Television Limited
- Key people: David Montgomery
- Sister channels: Local TV Bristol; Local TV Leeds; Local TV Liverpool; Local TV North Wales; Local TV Teesside; Local TV Cardiff; Local TV Tyne & Wear

History
- Launched: 28 February 2015
- Former names: Big Centre TV (2015-2016); Made in Birmingham (2016-2018); Birmingham TV (2018-2021); LOCAL TV Birmingham (2021-2023); TalkBirmingham (2023-2024)

Availability

Terrestrial
- Freeview: Channel 7

Birmingham TV
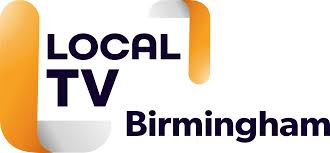

Birmingham; United Kingdom
- Channels: Digital: 7 (Freeview)

Programming
- Affiliations: Local TV

Ownership
- Owner: Local Television Limited
- Sister stations: Local TV Bristol; Local TV Leeds; Local TV Liverpool; Local TV North Wales; Local TV Teesside; Local TV Cardiff; Local TV Tyne & Wear

History
- First air date: 28 February 2015
- Former names: Big Centre TV (2015-2016); Made in Birmingham (2016-2018); Birmingham TV (2018-2021); LOCAL TV Birmingham (2021-2023); TalkBirmingham (2023-2024)

Technical information
- Licensing authority: Ofcom

Birmingham TV is a British local television station, serving Birmingham, the Black Country, Wolverhampton and Solihull in the West Midlands of England.

The station is owned and operated by Local Television Limited and forms part of a group of eight local TV stations.

== History ==
=== Big Centre TV ===
Kaleidoscope TV Limited was granted a licence to establish a local television station in November 2014, following the collapse of City8, a proposed station centred on the Birmingham area, which went into administration after failing to secure sufficient funding. Kaleidoscope was given 10 minutes' notice that its bid had been successful before an official announcement was made by the regulatory body Ofcom.

The new licence, initially known as Kaleidoscope TV, was given an Ofcom deadline of Saturday 28 February 2015 to begin broadcasting. Initially, Big Centre TV was jointly launched by Kaleidoscope co-founder Chris Perry and former ATV announcer and television executive Mike Prince, the station's director of programming. Prince also served as the station's chairman.

Big Centre TV's studios and offices were based at the Goldmine Centre in Walsall, located alongside the town's studio school, where students were able to gain work experience with the channel as part of their studies.

The station launched at 6 pm on Saturday 28 February 2015, preceded by a testcard and music, ending with the Electric Light Orchestra's "Mr. Blue Sky". Opening night programming included an hour-long introduction to the channel, a special edition of the local news programme The Midland, a 1981 episode of Crossroads, and coverage of an ice hockey league match. These were aired alongside two of the station's feature programmes, Life Stories and Project M.

The first news bulletin attracted criticism from Birmingham Mail TV critic Roz Laws, who noted that many of the reports concerned stories from several days before the channel's launch. The news bulletin was also beset by technical problems, with poor sound quality and an out-of-focus studio camera. The Black Country-based Express & Star observed that the launch programme had been "more corporate video than glitz and glamour" consisting of the channel's executives "sitting in front of their computers and discussing a business plan before the station was blessed by a clergyman". Responding to the criticism, then-channel director Chris Perry argued that Big Centre TV's teething problems were similar to those experienced by the larger channels, and urged viewers to stay with the station.

In April 2015, the station announced that Canadian media company Trek 2000 had invested in Big Centre TV. The station later opened a satellite studio at Edgbaston Cricket Ground in Birmingham for sports coverage.

=== Made in Birmingham ===
On 3 October 2016, Made Television, which was unsuccessful in bidding to run the franchise in 2012, announced it had bought Big Centre for an undisclosed sum, subject to approval from Ofcom.

Big Centre TV ceased broadcasting at midnight on Friday 4 November 2016 and reopened and relaunched as Made in Birmingham at 6 pm on Tuesday 8 November 2016. The channel began broadcasting on Sky and digital satellite platforms in January 2017.

On Thursday 25 May 2017, Made in Birmingham and its sister channels began carrying acquired programming from the UK and Ireland version of factual entertainment channel TruTV as part of a supply agreement with Sony Pictures Television. The station simulcast TruTV in two daily blocks from 1 pm to 5 pm and from 9 pm to 1 am (8 pm – midnight on Tuesdays to accommodate America's Got Talent). As of November 2017, the Made network simulcasts CBS Reality for eleven hours a day.

In July 2017, the channel moved from its Walsall Studio School base to new studios and offices on Bridge Street, beside the Gas Street Basin in Birmingham, situated close to those of ITV Central on Gas Street and BBC Birmingham at The Mailbox.

In November 2017, following a restructuring of the Made network's operations, local output was cut and around ten staff were reportedly made redundant. Production of the station's local news programme was temporarily transferred to Leeds, before it was axed in February 2018.

On 2 January 2018, Made in Birmingham ceased broadcasting on digital satellite and was replaced by a generic Made Television networked feed featuring a daily three-hour block of local news programming for six of the network's licence areas, including Birmingham.

On 19 August 2018, Made in Birmingham rebranded its social media pages as 'Birmingham TV' and changed its website address.

In 2021, the channel was rebranded again as 'Local TV Birmingham'.

In January 2022, Ofcom approved a request by the channel to close its Birmingham offices and move permanently to a remote production model implemented during the COVID-19 pandemic, with content sent electronically to Local TV's broadcast centre in Leeds for playout.

=== TalkBirmingham ===
On 18 October 2023 the station rebranded itself as TalkBirmingham, aligning themselves with the News UK television channel TalkTV. Talk began to provide the vast majority of the station's programming, with TalkBirmingham opting out for three hours a day to broadcast local news. Six months later, the brand reverted to 'Birmingham TV', ahead of TalkTV closing down.

== Programming ==
During its first six months on air, Big Centre TV aired a selection of archive programming, including the children's television series Ivor the Engine and Terrahawks, Jack Hargreaves' rural documentary series Out of Town, and the surviving episodes of Midlands-based soap opera Crossroads. The station also produced a number of nostalgia-based entertainment shows including The David Hamilton Show, The Ads Show, Crossroads Check-In, Tiswas Pies Again and The Long Lost Shows Show.

As the channel went on air, plans to repeat Crossroads were at the centre of a disagreement over the amount of royalties to be paid to its former actors – Paul Henry (who played Benny Hawkins) reportedly threatened to take legal action over the issue. The station discontinued Crossroads repeats in September 2015 and latterly phased out its Kaleidoscope-related archive output and nostalgia programming.

Big Centre TV continued to air archive programming from other sources until it ceased broadcasting in November 2016.

When Local Television Limited took over (as Made in...), Birmingham TV was required to broadcast 35 hours a week of first-run local programming.

As of February 2018, the station's sole local programme was a rolling four-hour block of pre-recorded local news, sport and features airing each weeknight from 5-9pm. A half-hour block also airs on the generic Made Television networked feed on digital satellite each weekday evening.

In 2023, the channel started simulcasting TalkTV's news programmes during the day, with hour long local news bulletins at 1pm, 6pm and 9pm (which were also looped overnight).
