= Birmingham News (TV programme) =

- Genre: Local news
- Countries of origin: England, United Kingdom
- Original language: English

Production
- Camera setup: Multi-camera
- Running time: 30 minutes
- Production company: Made Television

Original release
- Network: Made in Birmingham
- Release: 28 February 2015 – 17 November 2017

Related
- BBC Midlands Today; ITV News Central

Birmingham News is a local television news and current affairs programme, covering the Birmingham, Black Country and Solihull areas and produced by Made in Birmingham. It was broadcast between 2015 and 2017.

== Overview ==
Birmingham News covered stories from Made in Birmingham's broadcast area of Birmingham, the Black Country and Solihull. The programme first aired as The Midland on the opening night of Big Centre TV on Saturday 28 February 2015, before relaunching as Big News on Monday 4 April 2016.

Following the sale of Big Centre TV to Made Television, the station's news operation was overhauled and relaunched as Birmingham News on Tuesday 8 November 2016. In July 2017, Made in Birmingham's news operation moved from Walsall to new studios and offices on Bridge Street, beside the Gas Street Basin in Birmingham.

In November 2017, following a restructuring of the Made network's operations, Birmingham News was axed and local production was cut. Around ten staff were reportedly made redundant.

A replacement programme, Made TV News - combining local and national news stories - was produced from Leeds but axed in February 2018 in favour of West Midlands Live, a rolling block of pre-recorded news, sport and features produced by local videojournalists.

Presenters and reporters for Big Centre TV's news programmes and Birmingham News included Mike Prince, Bob Hall, Llewela Bailey, Jennifer Meierhans, Lois Swinnerton, Monika Plaha, Roshni Patel, Marverine Cole, Olivia Marks, Aaron Wiggins, Norman Bartlam, Gary James and James Brackpool.
