= Tyne and Wear News =

British TV news programme

- Also known as: Tyne & Wear Weekend News
- Genre: Local news
- Countries of origin: England, United Kingdom
- Original language: English

Production
- Production locations: University of Sunderland, Sunderland, Tyne and Wear
- Camera setup: Single-camera
- Running time: 30 minutes
- Production company: Made Television

Original release
- Network: Made in Tyne & Wear
- Release: 12 November 2014 – 17 November 2017

Related
- BBC Look North; ITV News Tyne Tees

Tyne and Wear News (previously known as Bulletin) is a local television news and current affairs programme, serving Tyne and Wear. Produced by Made in Tyne & Wear, the programme was produced and broadcast from studios at the University of Sunderland.

== Overview ==
Tyne and Wear News focused on local news stories from Tyne and Wear, as opposed to the broader regional news services provided by BBC North East and Cumbria and ITV Tyne Tees. The programme also covered stories from the surrounding areas of Northumberland and County Durham.

Originally broadcast as Bulletin, the programme was presented by former Metro Radio presenter Anna Foster, who left in March 2015 to join BBC Radio Newcastle. The station's then-head of news, Sarah Colley, presented the programme, until her departure in March 2016. She was replaced by long-serving reporter Zoe Muldoon (now at ITV Tyne Tees.

Bulletin was relaunched as Tyne and Wear News on Monday 26 September 2016. In November 2017, following a restructuring of the Made Television network's operations, the programme was axed and local production was cut.

A replacement programme, Made TV News - combining local and national news stories - was produced from Leeds but axed in February 2018 in favour of North East Live, a rolling block of pre-recorded news, sport and features produced by local videojournalists.
