= City TV (disambiguation) =

City TV may refer to:

- Citytv, a Canadian broadcast television network
- Citytv (Colombia), a local television station in Colombia which licenses branding from Citytv
  - Citytv.com.co, a Colombian video sharing website
- City TV (Bosnia and Herzegovina)
- City TV (Bulgaria), a cable music channel in Bulgaria
- City TV (Singapore), a defunct channel owned by Mediacorp
- City8, a proposed local television channel in Birmingham, United Kingdom known as "City TV" during initial planning
