= Mike Graham (journalist) =

British radio presenter

- Born: Archibald Michael Graham; 9 August 1960 (age 66); Hampstead, London, England
- Occupations: Journalist, radio presenter
- Known for: The Two Mikes, Talksport, Talkradio, Editor Scottish Daily Mirror

Archibald Michael Graham (born 9 August 1960) is a British journalist and broadcast commentator who previously presented Morning Glory, the breakfast show on Talk (formerly TalkTV). He hosted a weekly podcast version of Plank of the Week, on Talk before terminating his contract with the station in November 2025, resulting in the launch of his own podcast, The Mike Graham Show, streamed five mornings a week, in partnership with his weekly version of Plank of the Week, livestreamed on Fridays. As of 2026, his channel had built up a following of over 178,000 subscribers on YouTube.

Graham was formerly the editor of the Scottish Daily Mirror, and the deputy editor of the Daily Express.

== Early life and education ==
Graham was born in Hampstead, London, to Scottish couple Archibald Graham (1923–2008), a newspaper graphic artist, and his wife Mairi McAleavey (1924–2023).

Graham and his elder sister attended local schools in the London Borough of Camden. Graham attended the University of Bath but dropped out.

== Career ==
=== Press ===
Before his radio career, Graham was a Fleet Street journalist for 25 years. He was editor of the Scottish Daily Mirror and assistant editor of the Daily Express. He covered the Bosnian War in 1992 as a reporter for the Daily Express. He was based in New York City from 1984 to 1992.

=== Broadcasting ===
Graham joined UTV's former Scottish radio station Talk 107 in February 2006, anchoring the mid-morning slot 10 a.m. to 1 p.m. with The Independent Republic of Mike Graham. In November 2006, he was also appointed the station's programme director. In 2008, his contract was not renewed at Talk 107 and he started broadcasting on UTV's national Talksport radio station in the 1 a.m. to 6 a.m. slot on Saturday, Sunday and Monday. In April 2010, he presented the 10 p.m. to 1 a.m. slot every Friday and Saturday night, replacing George Galloway, as well as continuing to present the Monday 1 a.m. to 6 a.m. slot. In July 2010, he moved from weekends to weekdays, presenting alongside Mike Parry as Parry and Graham from 10 a.m. to 1 p.m.

Graham's future with Talksport seemed uncertain after co-host Mike Parry resigned from Talksport as a result of a contractual dispute; in March 2011 he took over Talksport's midweek 1 a.m. to 6 a.m., Extra Time. In October 2013, Parry returned to broadcast alongside Graham, debating "a host of issues" as a segment of "Extra Time" known as "The Two Mikes", which evolved into a regular three-hour slot headlined as The Two Mikes from 1 a.m. to 4 a.m. In 2015, Graham and Parry launched their Two Mikes 'World Tour' at venues throughout Britain. In 2015, "The Two Mikes" were named as "Alternative Men of the Year" by The Daily Telegraph. Their last radio show on Talksport was 10 p.m. to 1 a.m. on 29 March 2019. In April 2019, "The Two Mikes" disbanded; the first sign of the pair breaking up was the ending of their TMTV online shows. Graham was later a regular solo presenter for a weekday slot on talkRADIO between 10 a.m. and 1 p.m. returning to the title The Independent Republic of Mike Graham, a format mixture of booked guests and public phone-in callers. From 26 April 2022, his three hour show also appeared on TalkTV, simulcasting with Talkradio.

In November 2023, Julia Hartley-Brewer took over the mid-morning slot, with Graham's show moving to the evening schedule between 8 p.m. and 10 p.m. The shows' format shared the newspaper headlines, where the top stories were discussed and debated. He also occasionally guests on The Talk, with fellow journalists to discuss politics and news from around the world.

In March 2024, TalkTV announced they were to cease linear broadcasts from summer 2024, and move to an uncensored online platform format. This follows the Piers Morgan Uncensored show leaving linear in February. Scott Taunton, TalkTV's broadcasting president reassured employees such as Graham, that it was "business as usual" adding that there would be opportunities for "restructure".

Following his dismissal from Talk in November 2025, Graham announced via Substack that he plans to start an independent YouTube show. This began at 7am on 1 December 2025, and used The Independent Republic of Mike Graham moniker, which eventually evolved into The Mike Graham Show, format.

== Author ==
Graham's 2026, book Fake News, is currently on the Sunday Times bestselling list.

== Controversies ==
In April 2020, Graham was criticised for referring to Celtic F.C. as "the paedo's football club" on Twitter, while engaging in a spat with a user of the social networking platform.

In October 2021, Graham was accused of disparaging a guest on his show, Cameron Ford, a climate change activist, spokesperson for Insulate Britain and carpenter by trade, for his use of timber as a building material. Graham suggested it was hypocritical for an environmentalist to work with timber since it requires the felling of trees. When the guest responded that timber is a sustainable building material because, unlike the concrete alternative, trees can be regrown, Graham said it was equally possible to "grow concrete". After a few seconds of silence following this remark, Graham abruptly terminated the interview. His comment was ridiculed online. Later, on Jeremy Kyle's TalkRadio show, Graham said that concrete expands as it sets. On Twitter, the radio station shared an article about self-replicating concrete.

In July 2022, Graham made a false claim that Mind, a UK mental health charity, had been funding the legal fees of individuals seeking asylum in the UK; TalkTV later issued a public apology. In June 2023, TalkTV issued an apology and paid "substantial damages" to the charity Migrants Organise following defamatory claims made on Graham's show that the organisation were "human traffickers".

In October 2025, Graham was suspended from his TalkRadio show Morning Glory pending an internal investigation after a post containing racist language referring to multiculturalism and non-white people was made on his Facebook account. Graham denied making the post, stating that it had been made by a hacker who had accessed his account without his permission. He said: "As soon as I found out, I immediately deleted the post and have taken steps to ensure my cyber security is enhanced." In a statement made on 12 November 2025, News UK announced Graham's dismissal from TalkRadio. It said that despite initially agreeing to cooperate with a company investigation, he "reneged on several opportunities to cooperate with the company investigation".

In early October 2026, Graham received criticism after video surfaced of him making a joke regarding Andy Burnham’s late father's Alzheimer’s condition.
