= Cardiff News =

- Also known as: #CardiffNews
- Genre: Local news
- Countries of origin: Wales, United Kingdom
- Original language: English

Production
- Production locations: Elgin House, Cardiff
- Camera setup: Multi-camera
- Production company: Made Television

Original release
- Network: Made in Cardiff
- Release: 15 October 2014 – 19 November 2017

Related
- BBC Wales Today; ITV News: Wales at Six

Cardiff News (branded on air as #CardiffNews) is a local television news and current affairs service, broadcast between 2014 and 2017, covering Cardiff. Produced by Made in Cardiff, the news operation was based at studios in Cardiff city centre.

== Overview ==
Cardiff News originally aired as a twice-nightly programme called Hello Cardiff, focusing exclusively on news stories from the Cardiff area, as opposed to the national news services provided by BBC Cymru Wales and ITV Cymru Wales.

The programme was relaunched in February 2016 as Cardiff's Local News and moved to new timeslots of 6 p.m. and 9 p.m., followed two months later by a rebrand to #CardiffNews. In July 2016, the station reported it claimed a weekly audience of nearly 100,000 viewers for #CardiffNews.

In February 2017, the weekday programme was axed with shorter updates airing during the live magazine programme, The Crunch Cardiff, each weeknight from 6-8 p.m. An hour-long weekly review programme continued to air on Saturdays and Sundays at 7 p.m.

In November 2017, following a restructuring of the Made Television network's operations, The Crunch Cardiff was axed along with all local programming. A replacement programme, Made TV News – combining local and national news stories – was produced from Leeds. This was axed in February 2018 in favour of Cardiff Live, a half-hour block of pre-recorded news, sport and features produced by local videojournalists.

Presenters and reporters for Hello Cardiff and #CardiffNews included Jeff Collins, Laura Allen, Siriol Griffiths, Sian Angel, Matthew Harris, Rosalie Miller and Daniel Wilson.
