= Talk (streaming service) =

British streaming service

- United Kingdom
- Frequency: DAB+: 11A Sound Digital

Programming
- Language: English
- Format: News/talk

Ownership
- Owner: News UK Broadcasting Ltd; (News UK)
- Sister stations: Talksport; Talksport 2; Times Radio; Virgin Radio UK; Virgin Radio 80s; Virgin Radio Anthems; Virgin Radio Britpop; Virgin Radio Chilled; Virgin Radio Legends; Virgin Radio Pride

History
- First air date: 21 March 2016; 10 years ago

Technical information
- Licensing authority: Ofcom

Links
- Webcast: Radioplayer
- Website: talk.tv

Talk (previously talkRADIO and TalkTV) is a talk radio and free ad-supported streaming television channel in the United Kingdom. Based in London and owned by News Broadcasting, a subsidiary of News Corp., it is the sister station of national stations Talksport (originally known as Talk Radio UK), Virgin Radio UK and Times Radio.

As of December 2023, the station has a weekly audience of 725,000 listeners according to RAJAR. Talk employs a number of presenters described as shock jocks.

== TalkRadio history ==
=== Launch and pivot to sports talk ===
The original Talk Radio UK started in February 1995 using the AM frequencies previously occupied by BBC Radio 1 (1053/1089 kHz). It saw a number of presenters host shows in its first two years but settled down to a regular schedule with presenters such as Carol McGiffin, Anna Raeburn, Tommy Boyd and Mike Dickin. It failed to make sufficient revenue and in the late 1990s introduced sports output which increased audiences. In 2000, the station rebranded as Talksport and increased its emphasis on sports talk programming; some non-sports programming remained on the schedule, but this was dropped in March 2012.

TalkRadio's original logo (2016–2022)

=== Relaunch and Murdoch takeover ===
The introduction of a new DAB multiplex enabled Talkradio to be relaunched as a separate channel from Talksport on DAB on 21 March 2016. At launch, the station featured presenters Paul Ross, Julia Hartley-Brewer, Sam Delaney, Jon Holmes, Jonny Gould, and Iain Lee across its weekday schedule. In September 2016, the station's parent company, Wireless, came under the ownership of Rupert Murdoch's News UK, and in the following years tie-ups between the station and his newspapers increased. At times overnight programming is simulcast with Talksport.

In January 2018, Talkradio underwent a revamp to its weekday and weekend schedule in a bid to boost ratings and make the station more news-focused. On 9 June 2020, Talkradio moved from DAB to DAB+, and the DAB signal ceased transmission on 26 June.

In a 2023 poll by YouGov, 9% of respondents ranked TalkRadio/TalkTV as a trusted news-brand.

== TalkTV history ==
=== Background ===
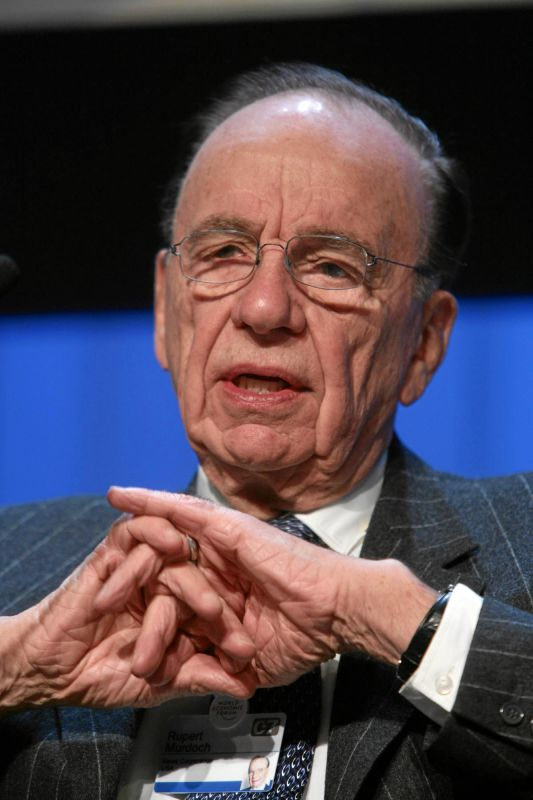
TalkTV marked Rupert Murdoch's return to British television news

Australian-born American media magnate Rupert Murdoch first entered the British television news market in 1989 with the launch of Sky News. In 1996, Murdoch entered the US and Australian television news markets with Fox News and Sky News Australia. In the 2010s, the Murdoch family began to sell a number of assets, including 21st Century Fox and Sky plc, the companies that owned those news channels at the time.

In January 2018, the UK's Competition and Markets Authority issued a preliminary report recommending that the Sky News TV channel be insulated from the remainder of Murdoch's assets, or divested, in order to preserve its editorial independence as a condition of 21st Century Fox's proposed acquisition of Sky. Murdoch retained control of Fox News and Sky News Australia, but the Murdoch-owned share in Sky plc – the parent company of Sky News UK – was sold to Comcast after it won a bidding war giving it majority ownership of Sky, leaving Murdoch without a television news presence in the United Kingdom.

=== Initial foundation as News UK TV ===
In December 2020, Ofcom granted a licence to News UK to operate a new linear television channel under the name News UK TV. By April 2021, it was thought that News UK TV would become a streaming-only service which would operate for a few hours a night. Rebekah Brooks said to News UK staff that "it was not commercially viable to launch a traditional news channel on linear TV".

David Rhodes, formerly of CBS News and Fox News, joined News UK with the aim of a launching their streaming video news service in 2020. In an interview with the BBC Radio 4's The Media Show, Andrew Neil claimed that he was approached to join News UK's television output by Rhodes before he joined rival GB News. In April 2021 it was announced that Rhodes was to leave News UK in June. Scott Taunton replaced Rhodes as News UK's CEO of broadcasting.

=== Change to TalkTV ===
By September 2021, plans for a service called News UK TV had been scrapped and Talkradio instead launched a video feed on smart/internet-connected TVs, with Mike Graham, Trisha Goddard, Julia Hartley-Brewer, Jeremy Kyle and Robert Rinder featuring as presenters on the service. The preceding months had seen its right-wing rival, GB News, launch as a linear television channel. The 'Talk' brand (Note: The 'Talk' brand in the UK was first used for the 1995 launch of Talk Radio UK, later known as Talksport.) and family of radio stations had previously been acquired by News UK in September 2016 as part of their purchase of Wireless Group.

Later in September 2021, it was revealed that the "Talk" brand would be used for a linear television station launching in 2022. This change of approach reportedly came after Murdoch was bemused by the channels on offer during the COVID-19 pandemic. It was also announced that Piers Morgan would host a show on the channel. Talkradio's Twitter account was renamed to TalkTV to coincide with the launch of the television station.

After gaining a comparatively large viewership on opening night, viewers declined over the following days. In 2023, several serving and former MPs and MEPs were employed as presenters on the channel including some who recently held positions within the previous Johnson cabinet. Ofcom's rules state that MPs can be presenters, but cannot be utilised as newsreaders.

News UK Broadcasting, TalkTV's parent company, made a loss of £34 million in the first year after TalkTV launched. In July 2022, Richard Wallace, former editor of the Daily Mirror, was hired as Head of TV.

=== Closure of linear TV channel ===
In February 2024, it was announced that Piers Morgan's show would leave TalkTV but continue on YouTube. Though the figures are calculated differently, Piers Morgan Uncensored had television viewer figures in the tens of thousands in comparison to YouTube videos with hundreds of thousands or millions of views. Morgan was among a number of conservative hosts to move television talk shows to online formats.

In March 2024, it was announced that TalkTV's linear TV channel would close in summer 2024 and that operations would become online-only. The closure was brought forward to 1 May 2024 and the streaming service rebranded to Talk. Between 1 May and 7 May the broadcast channel was gradually removed from Virgin Media, Sky, Freesat and DVB-T Freeview.

== Combined service, 2024 onwards ==
In late 2024, Talk ended most of its weekend programming, leaving just Weekend Breakfast and the 10–1 show. talksport is simulcast from 1pm until 6am the following day, while the digital channel repeats pre-recorded programmes.

In July 2026, in the hours prior to her death, former MP and Reform UK spokeswoman Ann Widdecombe appeared on Talk remotely from her home in what was her final public appearance prior to being murdered at her residence.

== Broadcasts ==
The channel broadcasts from studios in The News Building in Central London. The linear channel was launched on Freesat, Freeview, Sky, and Virgin Media on 25 April 2022. It can be viewed live on Samsung TV Plus and a TalkTV app can be downloaded on Samsung smart televisions. It can also be viewed live through LG webOS TV's (LG Channels) as well as being available on-demand. When announcing Piers Morgan's programme, it was stated that it would also be carried by two other Murdoch-owned outlets: Fox Nation (a streaming service in the U.S. run as a companion to Fox News) and Sky News Australia. In March 2023, TalkTV launched on Amazon Freevee. In 2024 the channel decided in the face of poor viewer ratings to become available on the Internet only from [northern hemisphere] summer 2024.

=== Local TV ===
Some TalkTV programming was also simulcast on local television channels around the UK. TalkTV formed a partnership with Local TV on 1 January 2023, to provide selected hours throughout the day with simulcasts of TalkTV. Local TV's chairman, David Montgomery, is a former executive at Murdoch's News UK.

On 18 October 2023, it was announced that Local TV channels would be aligned with the TalkTV branding (including name and logo), with the channels remaining wholly owned by Local TV Limited. Thus Birmingham TV became TalkBirmingham, Bristol TV became TalkBristol, Cardiff TV became TalkCardif, Leeds TV became TalkLeeds, Liverpool TV became TalkLiverpool, North Wales TV became TalkNorthWales, Teesside TV became TalkTeesside and Tyne & Wear TV became TalkTyne&Wear.

On 24 April 2024, the channels reverted to their previous branding a few days before the closure of TalkTV on broadcast television.

== Reception ==
Initial ratings were very low with some shows, especially those broadcast in the evening, recording few viewers. In July 2022, the channel had the lowest viewership among similar news and opinion-based news shows.

By 2023 some shows, particularly Piers Morgan Uncensored, achieved higher ratings than competitors: an hour-long February interview with Prime Minister Rishi Sunak had an average of 120,000 viewers, while BBC News had 70,000 viewers and Sky News and GB News had 20,000 in the same hour. Morgan's interviews with Donald Trump and Nadine Dorries exceeded 300,000 average viewers, while Dorries' interview with Boris Johnson had an average viewership of 50,000.

By June 2023, TalkTV had a total identified monthly audience (including sharing and streaming) of 2,135,000, with 14 minutes average daily viewing according to BARB.

== Criticism ==
After the recruitment in early 2023 of Conservative MP Nadine Dorries as a presenter, she was deemed to have breached the Government's anti-corruption rules by not advising ACOBA about her role with the channel.

Mike Graham received criticism in 2022 after making a false claim that Mind, a UK mental health charity, had been funding the legal fees of individuals seeking asylum in the UK; TalkTV later issued a public apology. In June 2023 TalkTV issued an apology and paid "substantial damages" to the charity Migrants Organise following defamatory claims made on Graham's show that the organisation were "human traffickers". The charity said that the comments aired by TalkTV had "exposed [the charity] to hate and threats of violence".

As of July 2023 the regulator, Ofcom, have not found TalkTV to be in any breaches of standards; however, they have clarified rules on politicians presenting programmes following the influx of politicians to both TalkTV and GB News. The broadcast of Piers Morgan Uncensored on 7 September 2022 caused more than 100 complaints to Ofcom. A broadcast of Dorries' programme on 24 March led to 52 complaints to Ofcom while discussing the Commons Select Committee of Privileges investigation into Boris Johnson's involvement in the partygate scandal. During the broadcast she said that Johnson was being tried by a kangaroo court.

In July 2023, Ofcom launched an investigation into a broadcast on 2 April regarding impartiality and politicians.

That same month, The Guardian reported that TalkTV "offered tens of thousands of pounds" in order to secure an interview with the parents who alleged that Huw Edwards had paid more than £35,000 to receive sexually explicit pictures from their child. The allegations had been printed by TalkTV's sister brand, The Sun newspaper. A source told The Guardian that the interview was part of a planned three-part documentary series. When the interview was announced, Edwards was receiving hospital treatment for depression. He had earlier been suspended by the BBC, but London's Metropolitan Police noted that they had "no information to indicate that a criminal offence has been committed".

In April 2024, Ofcom settled an investigation over comments made by a presenter against a Palestinian political official, warning TalkTV that it needed to take better care to ensure offensive comments were not aired on their channel.

== Notable presenters ==
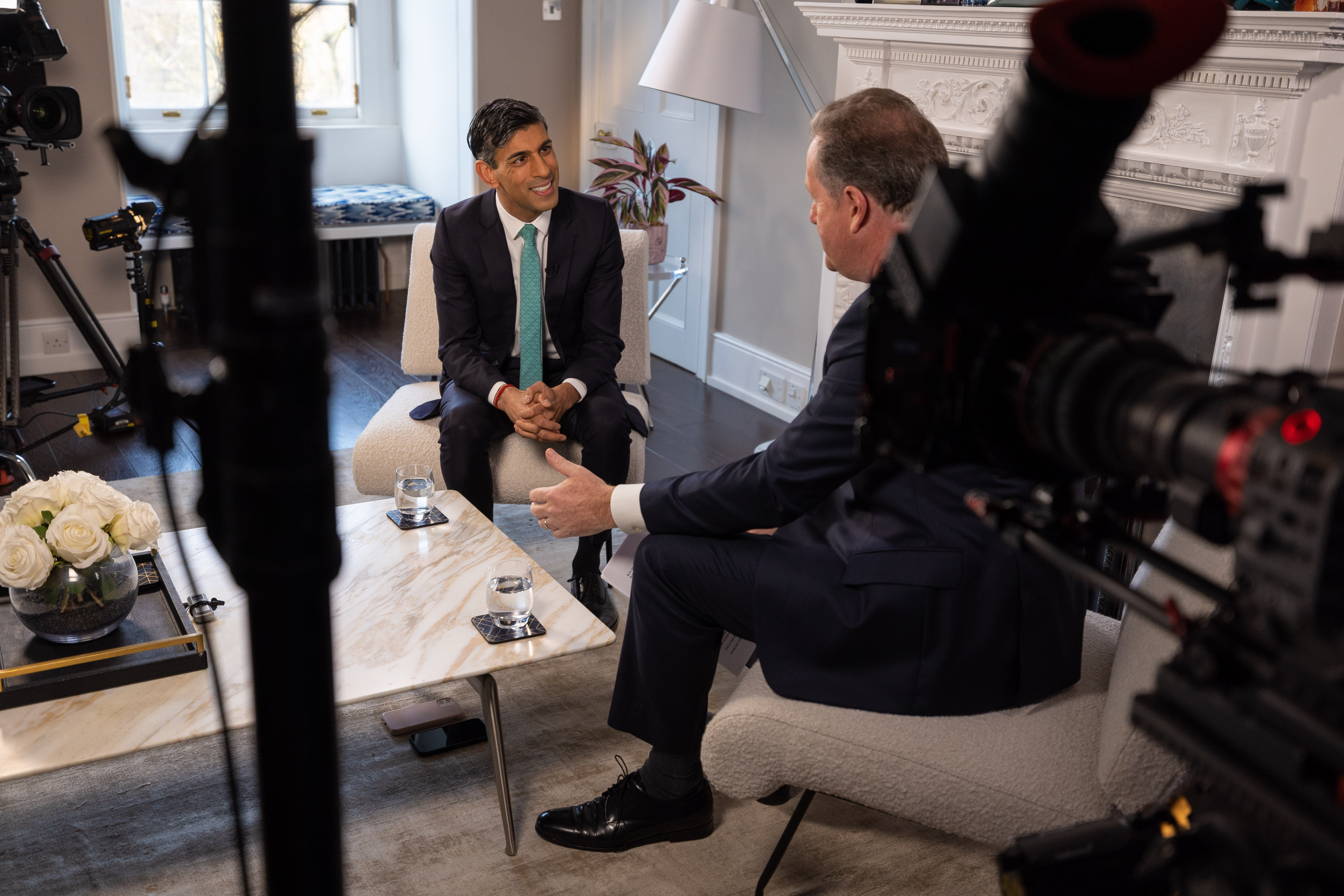
Piers Morgan's former show on the channel attracted high-profile guests, such as the former UK Prime Minister, Rishi Sunak, pictured here filming a show for the channel

- Ian Collins (2017–)
- Duncan Barkes (2025-)
- Julia Hartley-Brewer (2016–)
- Petrie Hosken (2022–)
- Jeremy Kyle (2022–)
- Alex Phillips (2022–)
- Isabel Oakeshott (2022–)

=== Former presenters ===
- Mike Graham
- Nadine Dorries
- Vanessa Feltz
- Piers Morgan
- Darryl Morris
- Tom Newton Dunn
- Sharon Osbourne
- Robert Rinder
- Nicola Thorp
- Richard Tice
- Claudia-Liza Vanderpuije
- Nazaneen Ghaffar
- Daisy McAndrew
- Kate McCann
- Nick de Bois
- Lizzie Cundy
- Cristo Foufas
- Trisha Goddard
- James Max
- Mark Dolan
- Danielle Nicholls
- Mark Saggers
- David Bull
- James Whale
