= Tyne & Wear TV =

Local television in Tyne & Wear, England

LOCAL TV Tyne & Wear
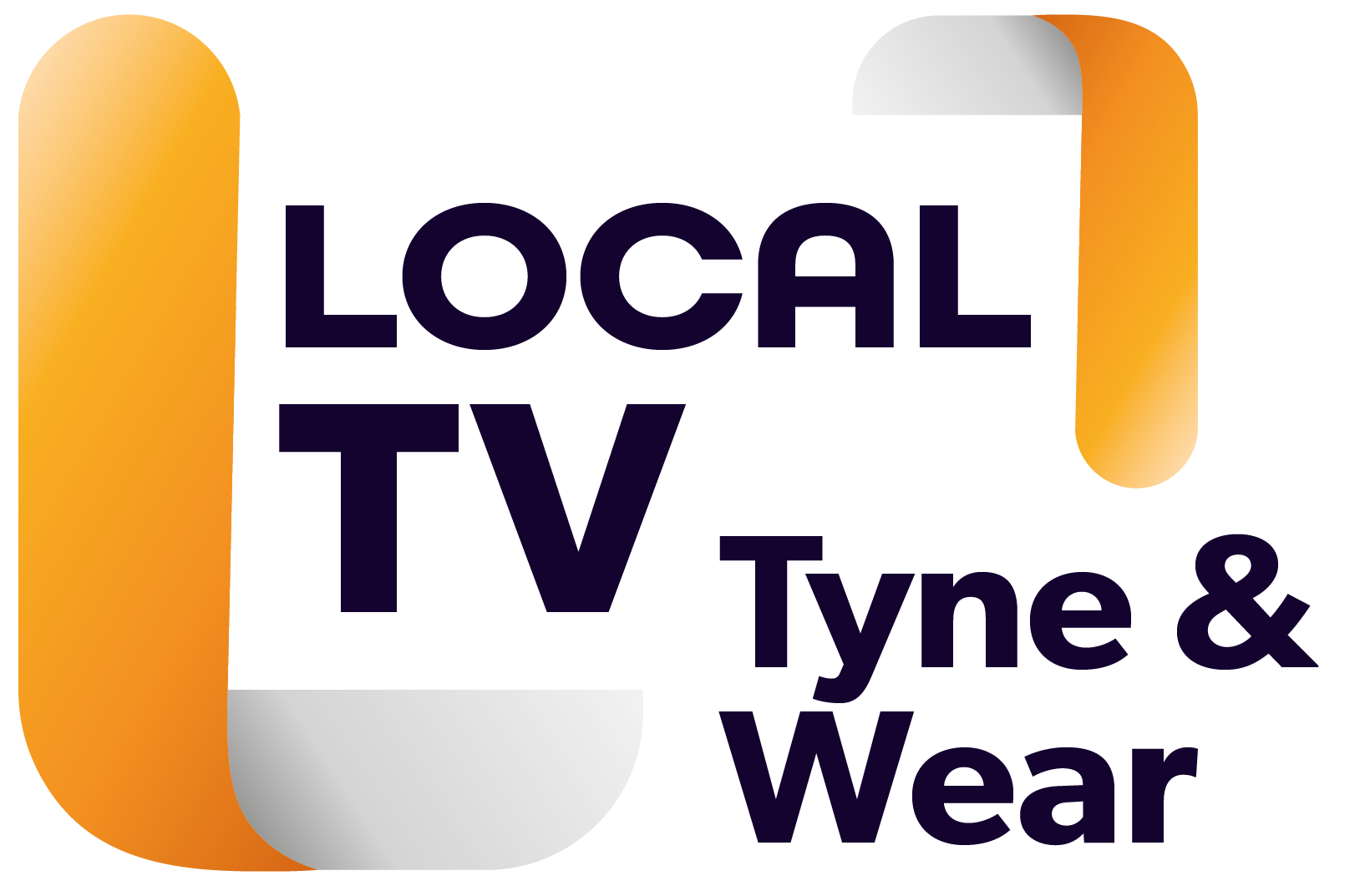
- Country: United Kingdom
- Broadcast area: Tyne and Wear
- Headquarters: David Puttnam Media Centre

Programming
- Picture format: 576i (16:9 SDTV)

Ownership
- Owner: Local Television Limited
- Sister channels: Local TV Birmingham; Local TV Bristol; Local TV Leeds; Local TV Liverpool; Local TV North Wales; Local TV Teesside; Local TV Cardiff

History
- Launched: 12 November 2014
- Former names: Made in Tyne & Wear; Tyne & Wear TV

Availability

Terrestrial
- Freeview: Channel 7

LOCAL TV Tyne & Wear
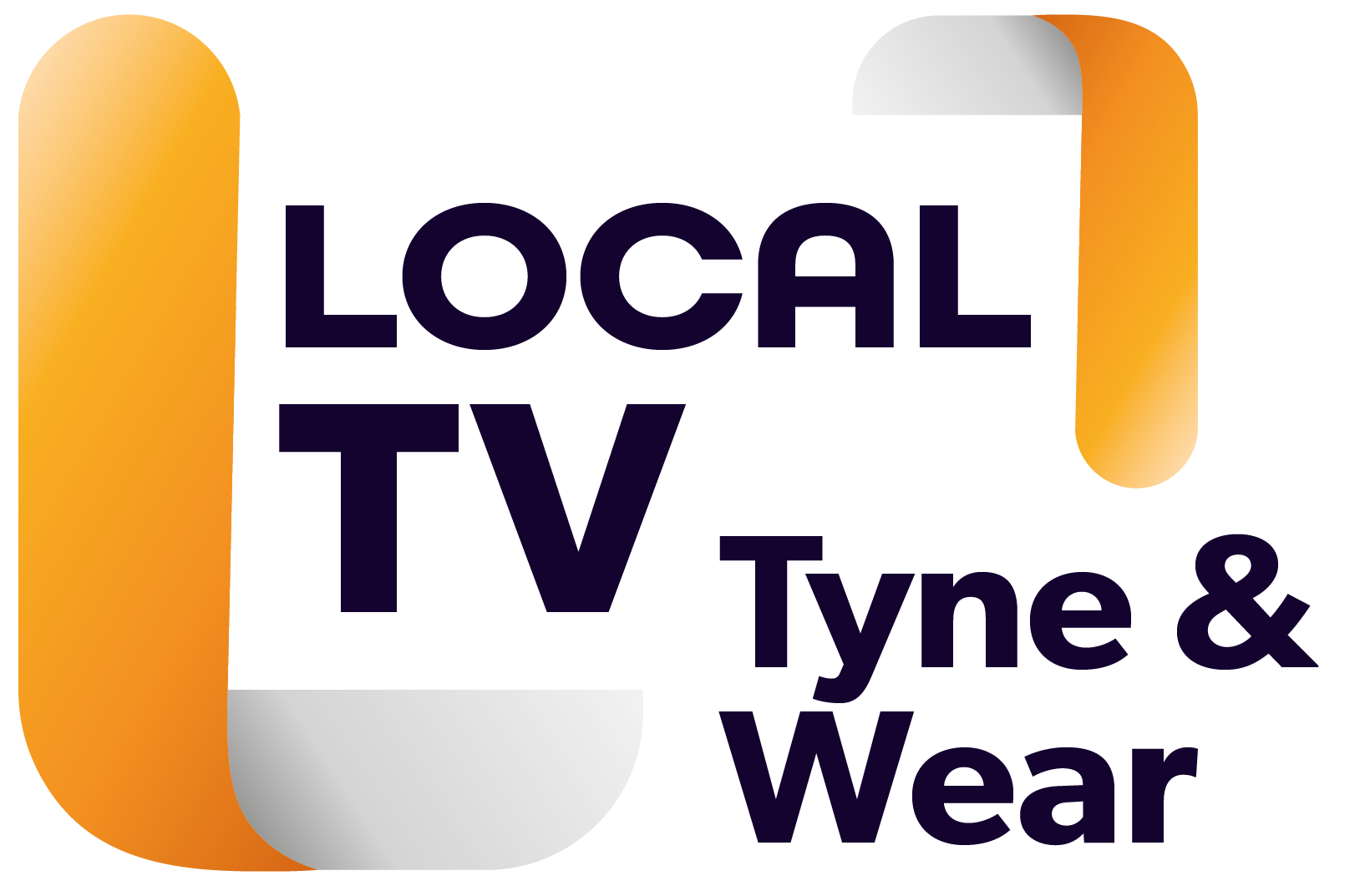

Tyne and Wear; United Kingdom
- Channels: Digital: 7 (Freeview)

Programming
- Affiliations: Local TV

Ownership
- Owner: Local Television Limited
- Sister stations: Local TV Birmingham; Local TV Bristol; Local TV Leeds; Local TV Liverpool; Local TV North Wales; Local TV Teesside; Local TV Cardiff

History
- First air date: 12 November 2014
- Former names: Made in Tyne & Wear; Tyne & Wear TV

Technical information
- Licensing authority: Ofcom

LOCAL TV Tyne & Wear (formerly Tyne & Wear TV, Made in Tyne & Wear and TalkTyne & Wear) is a local television station serving Tyne & Wear and parts of Northumberland and County Durham. The station is owned and operated by Local Television Limited and forms part of a group of eight local TV stations. Its local offices are based at the David Puttnam Media Centre in the St. Peter's campus at the University of Sunderland.

This station broadcasts on Freeview on channel 7 from the Pontop Pike transmitter.

== History ==
In December 2012, the broadcast regulator OFCOM announced Made Television had been awarded a licence to broadcast the local TV service for the Newcastle, Gateshead and Sunderland areas, serving a potential audience of 900,000 viewers in an area stretching from Alnwick in the north to Bishop Auckland in the south. There were three other bids for the licence – Neon TV, Metro8 Newcastle and YourTV Newcastle.

The channel began broadcasting on Freeview, Sky and Virgin Media platforms on Wednesday 12 November 2014, completing the roll out of the four Made TV stations, following launches in Bristol, Cardiff and Leeds. After three months on air, Made in Tyne & Wear claimed a weekly audience of around 197,000 viewers.

Since August 2015, the station has also been streaming live online via its website. On 5 April 2016, Made in Tyne and Wear moved from Freeview channel 8 to Freeview channel 7.

As of March 2017, the Tyne and Wear station also produces local programming for sister station Made in Teesside, serving Middlesbrough and surrounding areas.

On Thursday 25 May 2017, Made in Tyne & Wear and its sister channels began carrying acquired programming from the UK & Ireland version of factual entertainment channel TruTV as part of a supply agreement with Sony Pictures Television. The station simulcasts TruTV in two daily blocks from 1-5p.m. and from 9p.m.-1a.m. (8p.m. – midnight on Tuesdays to accommodate America's Got Talent). As of November 2017, the Made network simulcasts CBS Reality for eleven hours a day.

In November 2017, following a restructuring of the Made network's operations, local output was cut and studio production of daily news and magazine programmes was transferred to other Made TV stations. The station's bespoke local news programme was also axed.

On 2 January 2018, Made in Tyne & Wear ceased broadcasting on digital satellite and was replaced by a generic Made Television networked feed featuring a daily three-hour block of local news programming for six of the network's licence areas, including Tyne & Wear.

== Programming ==
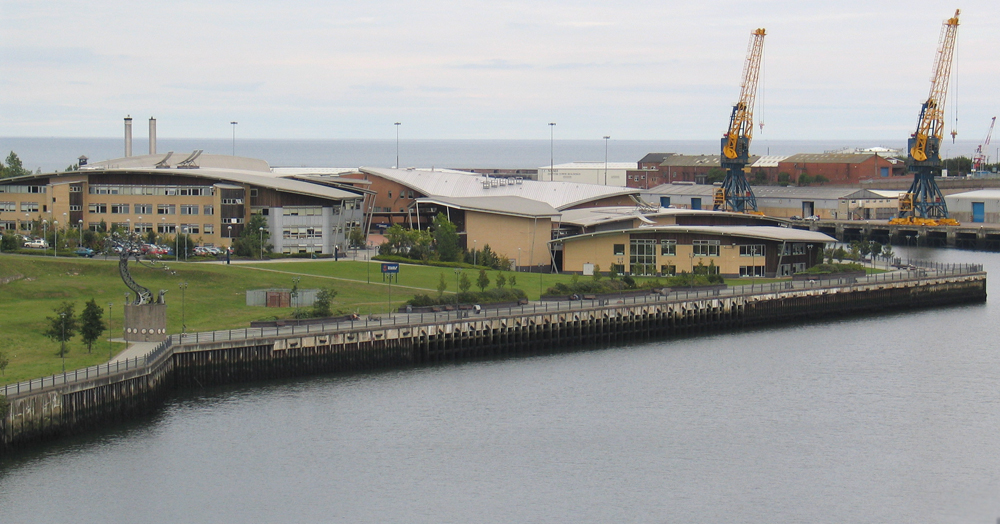
Made in Tyne & Wear is based at the St. Peter's Campus at the University of Sunderland

Tyne & Wear TV is required to broadcast 37 hours a week of first-run programming.

As of February 2018, the station's sole local programme is North East Live, a rolling four-hour block of pre-recorded local news, sport and features airing each weeknight from 5-9pm. A half-hour block also airs on the generic Made Television networked feed on digital satellite each weekday evening at 7.30.

Programmes produced by the other Local TV Ltd stations also air on the channel along with acquired programming from independent producers and other broadcasters around the UK, including the thrice-daily programming blocks, originally from CBS Reality and since the start of 2023, from TalkTV, airing from 9-11am, 1-5pm and 9pm-2am.

== Awards and nominations ==
Year	Association	Category	Nominee(s)	Result
2017	Diversity in Media Awards	Broadcaster of the Year	Made in Tyne & Wear	Nominated
