= Jonny Gould =

British radio and TV presenter

- Jonny Gould at Smooth Radio
- Born: Birmingham, England
- Occupations: Radio & television sports and politics broadcaster

Jonny Gould is a British media presenter, sports journalist, and political commentator. He has formerly broadcast on Sky News, Smooth Radio, and Talksport among others. Gould has commented on antisemitism, conservative politics, and the state of Israel across a number of outlets including his own Jonny Gould’s Jewish State podcast.

== Career ==
Gould started his career as a sports reporter for BBC Radio WM in 1986 before joining Beacon Radio in 1988.

From 1990 to 1993, Gould presented BBC World Service's Sports Roundup and Sports World. Between 1992 and 1995 Gould provided sports news for Independent Radio News as sports editor. He also co-presented the Thursday Night Sports Phone-In with Robbie Vincent between 1990 and 1994.

Gould founded Sportsmedia in 1992 to provide sports news and business news to the independent and BBC radio sector. The editorial was entirely funded by corporate sponsorship. Among the many broadcasters who worked there were Ian Abrahams, David Garrido, Lynsey Hooper, Vassos Alexander, Russell Hargreaves, Kevin Hatchard and Marcus Stead.

From 1997 to 2000, Gould was the sports presenter on Channel 5 (UK)'s morning news show 5 News with Katie Ledger. From 2000 to 2002, Gould presented ITV Sport's Football First, a live four-hour football scores and reports show, and Euro Fever, a live studio show with an audience and guests. He also presented ITV's The Goal Rush and was Premiership Plus' first ever touchline reporter, covering the channel's first eleven games. He also appeared as a guest on Between The Lines on ESPN with Ray Stubbs.

From 2008 Gould was a regular newspaper and sports pundit on Sky News providing comment and analysis alongside Eamonn Holmes, Sarah-Jane Mee and Tanya Bryer. In 2010 Gould started to appear regularly on Al Jazeera English as a football expert to discuss a wide variety of football-related stories. From February 2014, he became a regular contributor on Sunrise with Eamonn Holmes.

Gould presented breakfast show sport for Smooth Radio between 2012 and 2014. After the Olympics, Smooth Radio then retained Gould to present the morning sports news. Gould briefly joined BBC Radio 2, deputising for Vassos Alexander as sports presenter on the Breakfast Show for two weeks in September 2014. In addition to the weekday shows on Smooth Radio, Gould presented the weekend sports show Extra Time on Talksport in 2012.

Gould returned to working for the Wireless Group presenting the evening show on the newly launched DAB station talkRADIO. He moved to late afternoon on Sundays from November 2016. He left the station in July 2017 and returned after a summer at GB News in July 2021.

Gould's podcast Jonny Gould’s Jewish State began in 2018 and has featured issues related to Israel and antisemitism in the United Kingdom, as well as a focus on Conservative politics. Guests have included Conservatives Shaun Bailey and Nick Timothy, as well as ambassadors to the United Kingdom for Hungary, the United Arab Emirates and Israel.

== Political views ==
Gould has written of how he "stood up to Jeremy Corbyn and the assorted ideologies his supporters espouse", regarding antiracism and antisemitism in the Labour party. In a June 2020 article in the Times of Israel in which he referenced George Floyd, Ethiopian Jews, the "importance of racial harmony" and the welcoming of all refugees regardless of skin colour, he closed the article with "All lives matter. All lives are sacred."

In April 2021 he stated that "football is being hijacked by politics" following claims of antisemitic abuse on Aston Villa's social media channels following a Pesach message.

== Personal life ==
Gould is a fan of his home city football club Aston Villa and has been a patron and later director of the Aston Villa Supporters' Trust. He is also a follower of Scottish semi-professional club Nairn County.

Gould resigned his position as a director of the Aston Villa Supporters' Trust in April 2021, alleging that he had been subject to antisemitic abuse which the Trust had not acted against. The Trust acknowledged the abuse Gould was receiving and responded with "any allegations made (against Jonny) are groundless".

His mother's family originated in Vienna, moving to Aston and Sutton Coldfield. His family are Jewish, and his brother Ash is a former producer and long-term co-presenter of James Whale.

== Philanthropy ==
Gould is also an ambassador for Action Duchenne a national charity supporting people living with Duchenne Muscular Dystrophy and Striker Boy, a mental health awareness campaign for children and young adults with the charity MIND.
