= Scott Taunton =

Australian businessman (born 1971)

- Born: 1971 (age 54–55); Canberra, Australia
- Education: Canberra High School
- Alma mater: Lake Ginninderra College
- Occupation: Chief executive of Wireless Group
- Years active: 1992–present
- Employer: News UK

Scott Taunton (born 1971) is an Australian businessman who has been the chief executive of the Wireless Group since November 2016. He is also the EVP and President of Broadcasting of News UK.

== Career ==
Taunton began his career as an IT training manager at the Australian Government's Department of Health in 1992. He later moved to Belfast, where he co-founded the internet service provider DNA Internet in 1995. He was general manager of DNA Internet until March 2000, when the company was acquired by Northern Ireland-based broadcaster UTV Media. He was later appointed chief executive of UTV Radio following its acquisition by UTV Media in June 2005. In August 2014, he became UTV's chief operating officer. UTV Media was acquired by Rupert Murdoch's News UK in February 2016 and changed its name to Wireless Group, with Taunton continuing as COO.

As Wireless's chief operating officer, Taunton oversaw the relaunch of Virgin Radio in March 2016, before being promoted to chief executive eight months later. In June 2020, with Taunton at the helm, another talk radio station was launched, Times Radio. Taunton said of the station, "Since Wireless joined the News UK family, we have been working more and more collaboratively with The Times, lending our radio and podcasting expertise to develop an audio strategy for one of the world's pre-eminent newsbrands."

In April 2021, News UK revealed that its planned television channel had been scrapped, with new plans to launch a streaming service instead. David Rhodes, who was due to spearhead the project, departed as chief executive of News UK Broadcasting and was replaced by Taunton. On 16 September 2021, it was announced that News UK had reversed their decision and would launch its news channel, talkTV, in 2022. According to Taunton, "talkTV will provide a rich mix of entertaining and informative shows that no other service provides."

== Personal life ==
On 13 October 2014, Taunton became engaged to Georgia Mcguffie.
