= Mark Kielesz-Levine =

British-Polish television reporter and presenter (born 1985)

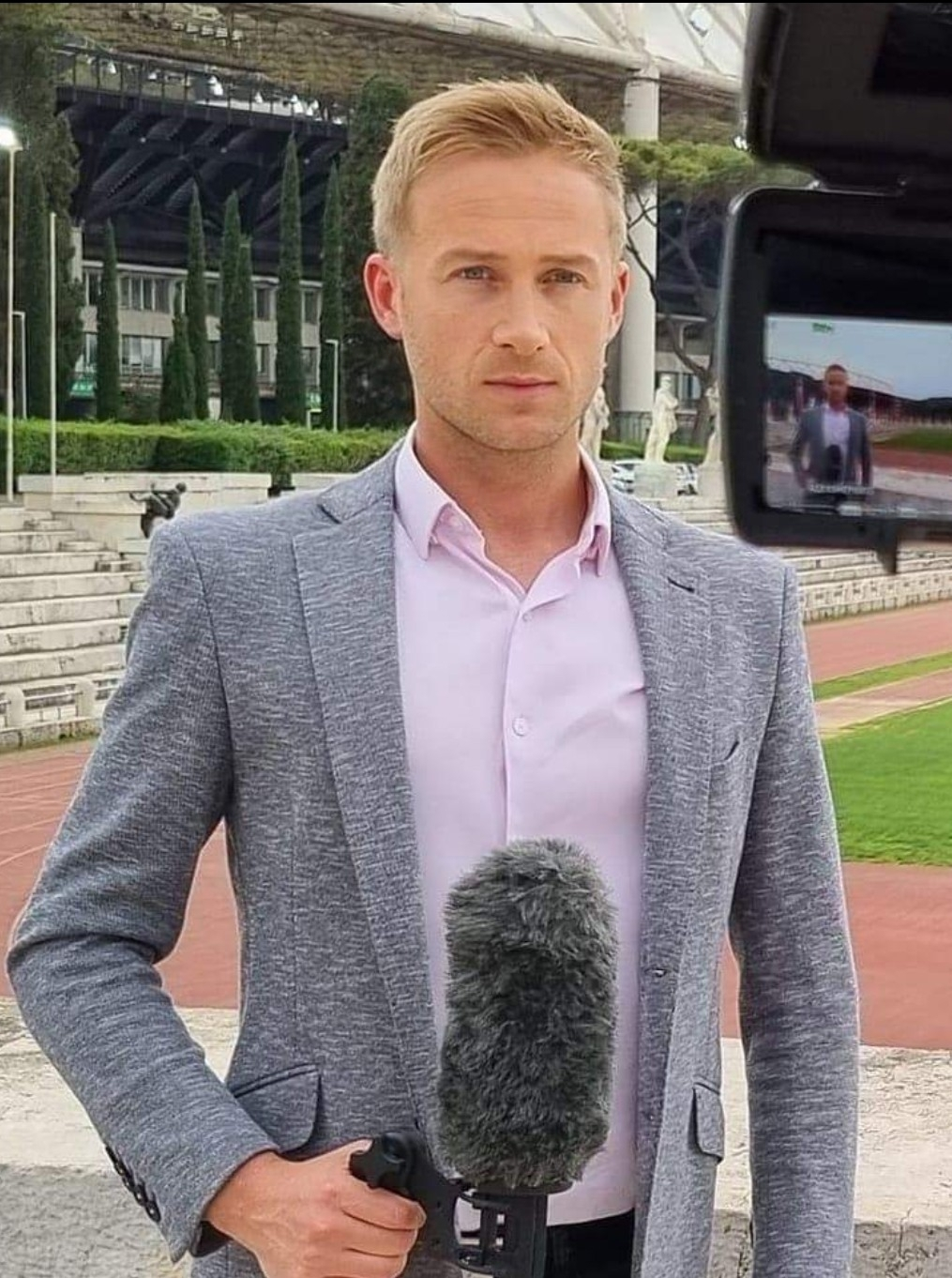
- Kielesz-Levine reporting in Italy for ITV Central
- Born: 1985 (age 40–41); Leeds
- Occupation: Journalist

Mark Kielesz-Levine (born 1985) is a British Polish television reporter and presenter. He currently works at ITV Central in the Midlands.

Originally from Leeds in West Yorkshire, Kielesz-Levine started his journalism career following a postgraduate diploma at Leeds Trinity University, after completing an undergraduate degree at Newcastle University and a master's degree at the University of Leeds.

He first worked for the Global radio network brand before moving to local television and Leeds TV where he would become the lead news and sport presenter for Leeds and then across the whole network.

Kielesz-Levine has been nominated for both Royal Television Society and O2 Journalism awards, winning the Reporter of the Year Award for Yorkshire in 2017 He has worked for ITV Central since August 2019.
