= Cardiff TV =

Local TV channel in Cardiff, Wales

LOCAL TV Cardiff
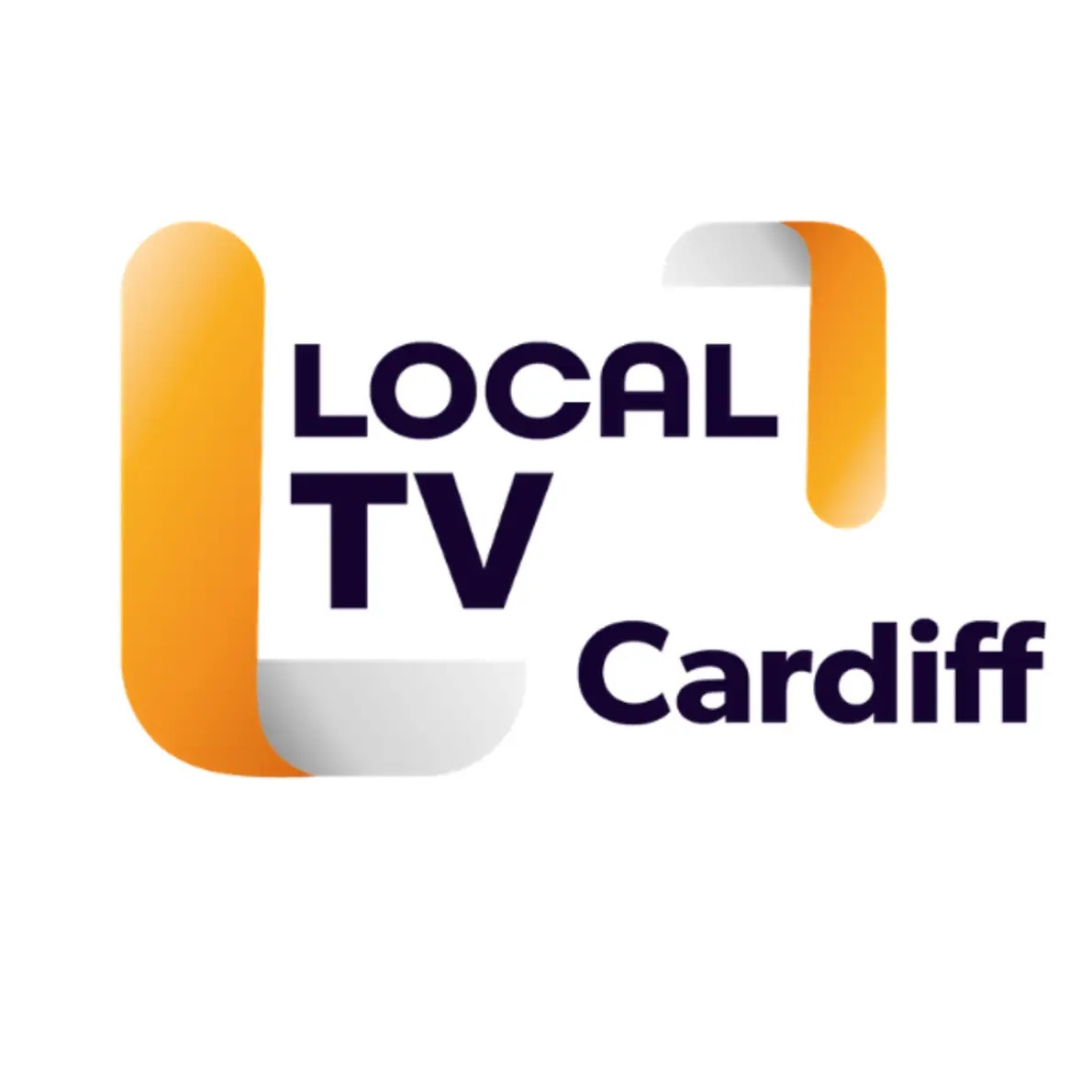
- Country: United Kingdom
- Broadcast area: Cardiff
- Headquarters: Elgin House, St Mary's Street, Cardiff

Programming
- Picture format: 576i (16:9 SDTV)

Ownership
- Owner: Local Television Limited
- Sister channels: Local TV Birmingham; Local TV Bristol; Local TV Leeds; Local TV Liverpool; Local TV North Wales; Local TV Teesside; Local TV Tyne & Wear

History
- Launched: 15 October 2014
- Former names: Made in Cardiff; Cardiff TV; TalkCardiff

Availability

Terrestrial
- Freeview: Channel 8

Local TV Cardiff
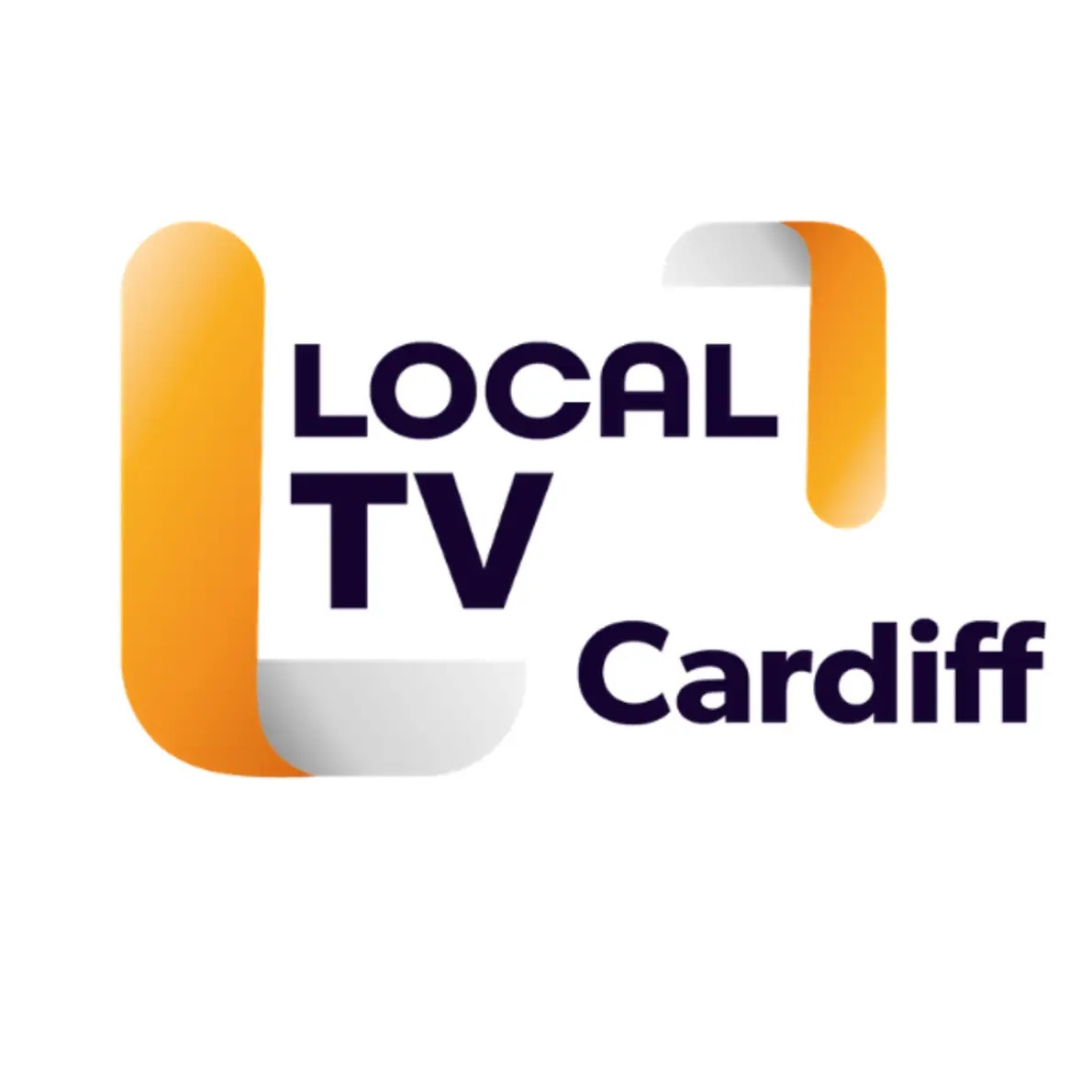
- Cardiff; United Kingdom
- Channels: Digital: 8 (Freeview)

Programming
- Affiliations: Local TV

Ownership
- Owner: Local Television Limited
- Sister stations: Local TV Birmingham; Local TV Bristol; Local TV Leeds; Local TV Liverpool; Local TV North Wales; Local TV Teesside; Local TV Tyne & Wear

History
- First air date: 15 October 2014
- Former names: Made in Cardiff; Cardiff TV; TalkCardiff

Technical information
- Licensing authority: Ofcom

LOCAL TV Cardiff (formerly known as TalkCardiff, Cardiff TV and Made in Cardiff) is a local television station serving Cardiff and surrounding areas. The station is owned and operated by Local Television Limited and formed part of a group of eight Local TV channels.

The channel is predominantly hosted by Local TV reporter James Peej-Watkins.

== Overview ==
In September 2012, the broadcast regulator OFCOM announced Made Television had been awarded a licence to broadcast the local TV service for the Cardiff area, serving a potential audience of 800,000 viewers, stretching from Merthyr Tydfil in the north to Bridgend in the west and Newport in the east. The licence was also contested by 'Cardiff Local TV', a group set up by the locally based technology firm Cube Interactive.

Previously, a low-powered RSL station, Capital TV, broadcast to the Cardiff area from 2002 to 2009, when analogue transmissions ceased from the Wenvoe transmitter.

The station began broadcasting on Freeview, Sky and Virgin Media platforms at 8pm on Wednesday 15 October 2014, a week after the launch of sister station Made in Bristol. After three months on air, Made in Cardiff claimed a weekly audience of 104,000 viewers.

Since August 2015, the station has also been streaming live online via its website. On 5 April 2016, Made in Cardiff moved from Freeview channel 23 to Freeview channel 8.

As of April 2016, Made in Cardiff's station manager is Daniel Glyn. Made TV's Cardiff and Bristol stations also shared a regional managing director, Chris James.

In July 2016, the channel reported it claimed a weekly audience of 160,000 viewers, including nearly 100,000 for its evening news programmes and 70,000 for the nightly magazine show The Lowdown.

In February 2017, a revamp of the station's local output led to the launch of a flagship two-hour live magazine show on weeknights, The Crunch Cardiff, incorporating news, sport, current affairs and entertainment. The lead presenters were Tom Evans and Sian King. A weekly half-hour Welsh language programme, Made Cymraeg, was introduced in May 2017, following the launch of Made in North Wales.

On Thursday 25 May 2017, Made in Cardiff and its sister channels began carrying acquired programming from the UK & Ireland version of factual entertainment channel TruTV as part of a supply agreement with Sony Pictures Television. The station simulcasts TruTV in two daily blocks from 1-5pm and from 9pm-1am (8pm – midnight on Tuesdays to accommodate America's Got Talent). As of November 2017, the Made network simulcasts CBS Reality for eleven hours a day.

In November 2017, following a restructuring of the Made network's operations, The Crunch Cardiff was axed and replaced by a networked version of the programme called 'The Big Daily'. Similar in format to 'The Crunch Cardiff', the show was broadcast live from Made in Birmingham, and included regional opt-outs to local content. The programme was originally hosted by Tom Evans and Mel Crawford, before being axed a few months later.

On 2 January 2018, Made in Cardiff ceased broadcasting as a sole local channel and was replaced on all platforms by a generic Made Television networked feed, including a daily three-hour block of local news programming for six of the network's licence areas, including Cardiff.

== Programming ==
Cardiff TV is required to broadcast 37 hours a week of first-run local programming.

As of February 2018, the station's sole local production is Cardiff Live, a half-hour block of pre-recorded local news, sport and features airing each weeknight at 5pm on the generic Made Television networked feed.

Programmes produced by the other Local TV Ltd stations also air on the channel along with acquired programming from independent producers and other broadcasters around the UK, including the thrice-daily programming blocks, originally from CBS Reality and since the start of 2023, from TalkTV, airing from 9-11am, 1-5pm and 9pm-2am.
