= Liverpool TV =

Local TV station in Liverpool, England

LOCAL TV Liverpool
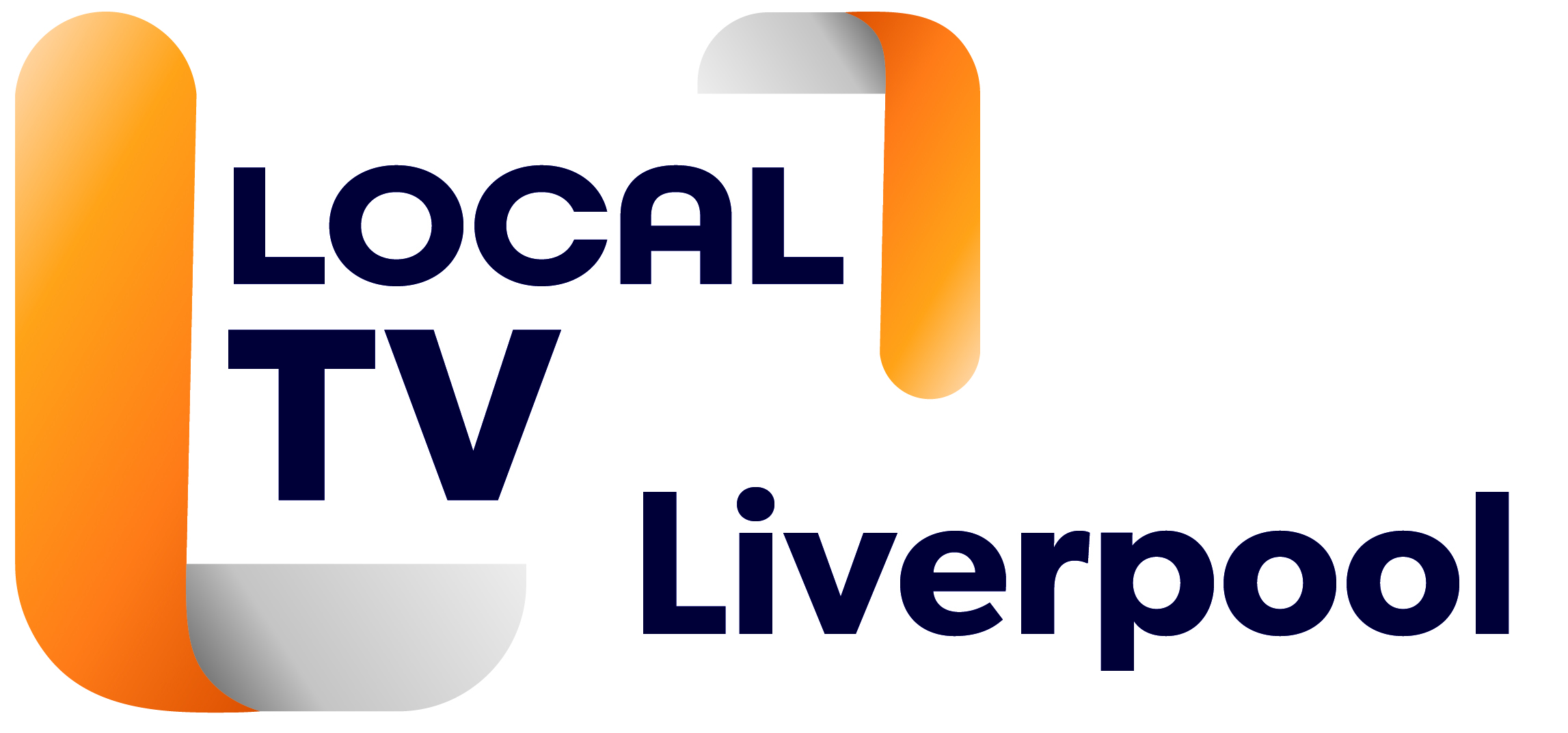
- Country: England
- Broadcast area: Liverpool City Region
- Headquarters: Toxteth TV, Toxteth, Liverpool

Programming
- Picture format: 576i (16:9 SDTV)

Ownership
- Owner: Local Television Limited
- Sister channels: Local TV Birmingham; Local TV Bristol; Local TV Leeds; Local TV North Wales; Local TV Teesside; Local TV Cardiff; Local TV Tyne & Wear

History
- Launched: 4 December 2014
- Former names: Bay TV Liverpool, Made in Liverpool, Liverpool TV, TalkLiverpool

Links
- Website: uklocal.tv/localtv-liverpool/

Availability

Terrestrial
- Freeview: Channel 7

LOCAL TV Liverpool
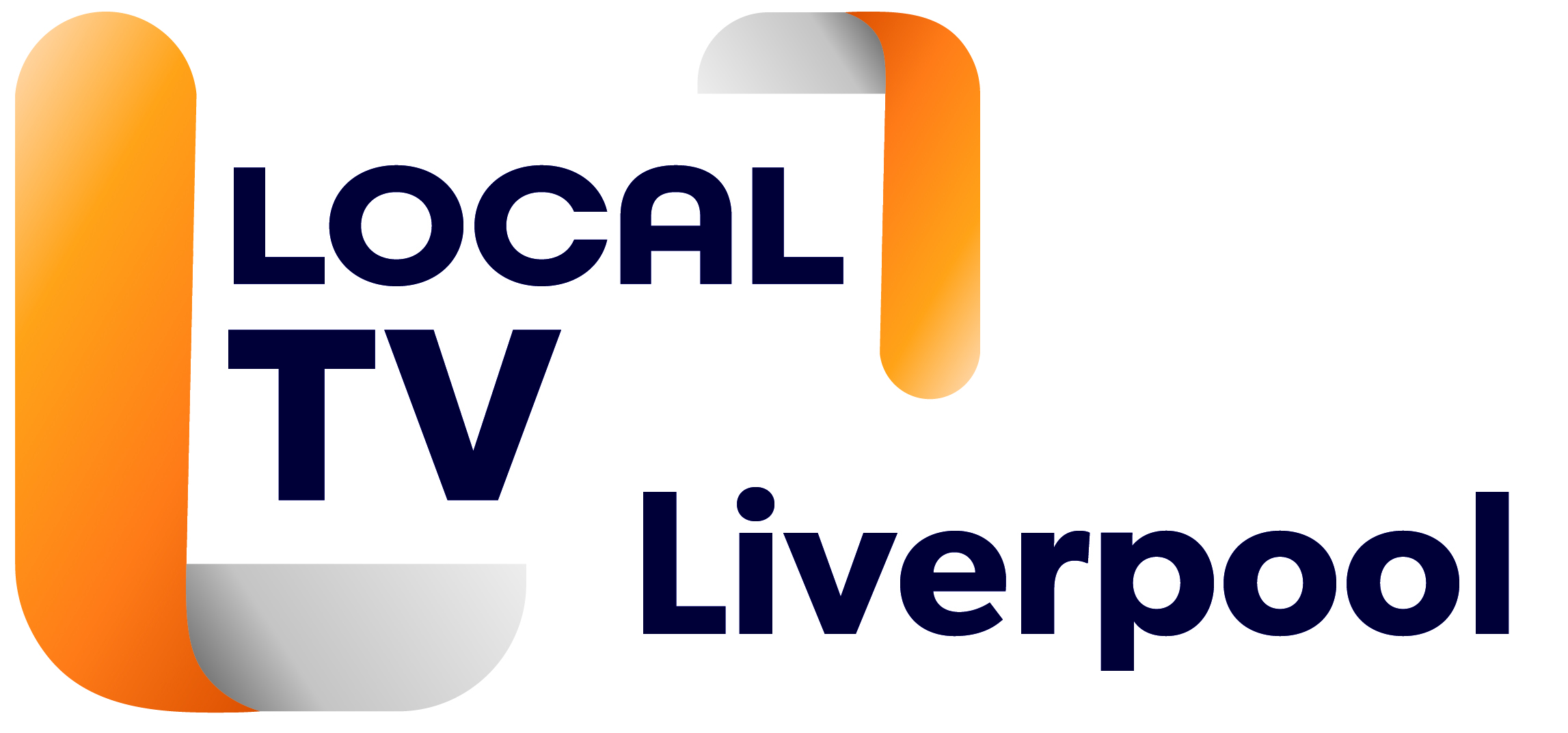

Liverpool; United Kingdom
- Channels: Digital: 7 (Freeview)

Programming
- Affiliations: Local TV

Ownership
- Owner: Local Television Limited
- Sister stations: Local TV Birmingham; Local TV Bristol; Local TV Leeds; Local TV North Wales; Local TV Teesside; Local TV Cardiff; Local TV Tyne & Wear

History
- First air date: 4 December 2014
- Former names: Bay TV Liverpool, Made in Liverpool, Liverpool TV, TalkLiverpool

Technical information
- Licensing authority: Ofcom

Liverpool TV (formerly known as Bay TV Liverpool, Made in Liverpool, LOCAL TV Liverpool and TalkLiverpool) is a local television station serving Liverpool City Region and surrounding areas. The station is owned and operated by Local Television Limited and forms part of a group of nine LOCAL TV stations (eight licensed as local stations with Manchester TV on a standard regional licence). It broadcasts from studios and offices in the Toxteth suburb of Liverpool.

== Overview ==
Bay TV Liverpool was launched in November 2011 as a video-on-demand service producing local content, winning Best Media Website at the 2013 Prolific North Awards.

On 21 February 2013, Bay TV was awarded a local TV licence by Ofcom to broadcast a linear television channel in the Liverpool City Region area including Wigan and parts of Cheshire. Under the initial proposals, the channel aimed to air ten hours of local programming each day, including two and a half hours of news on weekdays, and a weekly political programme. The channel began broadcasting on Freeview channel 8 on Thursday 4 December 2014 at 5.30pm, later moving to channel 7 following the closure of BBC Three.

On 23 August 2016 it was announced that Bay TV Liverpool had entered administration. The station owed a total of £451,575, with a debt to Revenue and Customs outstanding at £145,187, individual shareholder loans debts to the value of £133,800, and other “trade and expense creditors” to the sum of £152,488. A week later, Made Television announced it had bought out the station for an undisclosed sum - the group was one of four bidders who lost the original licence award to Bay TV.

Bay TV ceased broadcasting at 11pm on Sunday 9 October 2016 and reopened and relaunched as Made in Liverpool at 6pm on Wednesday 19 October 2016. The station began broadcasting on Sky and digital satellite platforms in January 2017.

As of April 2017, the Liverpool station also produces local news programming for sister station Made in North Wales, serving Mold, Denbigh, Ruthin and surrounding areas.

On Thursday 25 May 2017, Made in Liverpool and its sister channels began carrying acquired programming from the UK & Ireland version of factual entertainment channel TruTV as part of a supply agreement with Sony Pictures Television. The station simulcasts TruTV in two daily blocks from 1-5pm and from 9pm-1am (8pm - midnight on Tuesdays to accommodate America's Got Talent). As of November 2017, the Made network simulcasts CBS Reality for eleven hours a day.

In November 2017, following a restructuring of the Made network's operations, local output was cut with studio production of daily news and magazine programmes was transferred to other Made TV stations. The station's bespoke local news programme was also axed.

On 2 January 2018, Made in Liverpool ceased broadcasting on digital satellite and was replaced by a generic Made Television networked feed featuring a daily three-hour block of local news programming for six of the network's licence areas, including Liverpool.

In 2021, the station was rebranded from Liverpool TV to LOCAL TV Liverpool, with the intention that the station would become part of the 'Northern TV Network'. This was media executive and newspaper owner David Montgomery (National World's Executive Chairman) plan to link up LOCAL TV Liverpool with the new Freeview channel 99 Manchester service and stations in Newcastle and Leeds. In October 2023, the station was renamed TalkLiverpool as part of its partnership with Montgomery Media and Rupert Murdoch's News UK, TalkTV. However, six months later, in April 2024, TalkTV closed its national broadcasting operation and the station's name reverted to Liverpool TV.

The station broadcasts from the Storeton relay transmitter which is transmitted via the Winter Hill transmitter which also broadcast the station via a directional localised signal beam on Freeview channel 7, but is not available on satellite or cable.

== Programming ==
Liverpool TV is required to broadcast 35 hours a week of first-run local programming.

As of February 2018, the station's sole local programme is Merseyside Live, a rolling four-hour block of pre-recorded local news, sport and features airing each weeknight from 5-9pm. A half-hour block also airs on the generic Made Television networked feed on digital satellite each weekday evening at 7pm. Programmes produced by the other Made TV stations also air on the channel along with acquired programming from independent producers and other broadcasters around the UK, including the thrice-daily programming blocks from CBS Reality - airing from 9-11am, 1-5pm and 9pm-2am.

As of December 2021, the channel acts as a simulcast of CBS Reality for most of the day, with Local TV Liverpool's news broadcast at lunch between 1–2pm and in the evening between 6-8pm. In addition to these slots, Local TV comes back on air between 2-9am with repeats of its newscasts being listed next to a breakfast news update from 6am.

Programmes produced by the other Local TV Ltd stations also air on the channel along with acquired programming from independent producers and other broadcasters around the UK, including the thrice-daily programming blocks, originally from CBS Reality and since the start of 2023, from TalkTV, airing from 9-11am, 1-5pm and 9pm-2am.

== See also ==
- Local television in the United Kingdom
