= Local TV Teesside =

LOCAL TV Teesside
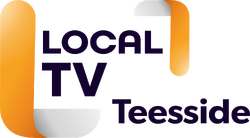
- Country: United Kingdom
- Broadcast area: Middlesbrough and Teesside
- Headquarters: University of Sunderland

Programming
- Picture format: 576i (16:9 SDTV)

Ownership
- Owner: Local Television Limited
- Sister channels: Local TV Birmingham; Local TV Bristol; Local TV Leeds; Local TV Liverpool; Local TV North Wales; Local TV Cardiff; Local TV Tyne & Wear

History
- Launched: 30 March 2017
- Former names: Made in Teesside; Teesside TV

Availability

Terrestrial
- Freeview: Channel 7

LOCAL TV Teesside
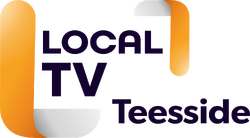

Teesside; United Kingdom
- Channels: Digital: 7 (Freeview)

Programming
- Affiliations: Local TV

Ownership
- Owner: Local Television Limited
- Sister stations: Local TV Birmingham; Local TV Bristol; Local TV Leeds; Local TV Liverpool; Local TV North Wales; Local TV Cardiff; Local TV Tyne & Wear

History
- First air date: 30 March 2017
- Former names: Made in Teesside; Teesside TV

Technical information
- Licensing authority: Ofcom

LOCAL TV Teesside (formerly known as TalkTeesside) is a local television station serving Middlesbrough and Teesside and parts of County Durham and North Yorkshire.

The station is owned and operated by Local Television Limited and forms part of a group of eight Local TV stations. This station broadcasts on Freeview on channel 7 from the Bilsdale transmitter.

== History ==
In November 2013, the broadcast regulator OFCOM announced Made Television and Trinity Mirror had been awarded a licence to run a local TV service for the Middlesbrough and Teesside areas. The licence had also been contested by a locally based group known as TeesVision.

Made in Teesside began broadcasting on Freeview and Virgin Media platforms at 6 pm on Thursday 30 March 2017. The station is run jointly with its sister Tyne and Wear station from studios at the University of Sunderland with production staff also based locally in Middlesbrough. In November 2017, studio production of daily news and magazine programmes was transferred to other Made TV stations.

On Thursday 25 May 2017, Made in Teesside and its sister channels began carrying acquired programming from the UK & Ireland version of factual entertainment channel TruTV as part of a supply agreement with Sony Pictures Television. The station simulcasts TruTV in two daily blocks from 1-5 pm and from 9 pm-1 am (8 pm – midnight on Tuesdays to accommodate America's Got Talent). As of November 2017, the Made network began simulcasting CBS Reality for eleven hours a day.

In January 2022, OFCOM approved a request by the channel to close its Middlesbrough offices and move permanently to a remote production model implemented during the COVID-19 pandemic, with content sent electronically to Local TV's broadcast centre in Leeds for playout.

== Programming ==
Teesside TV is required to broadcast 37 hours a week of first-run programming.

As of February 2018, the station's sole local programmes are North East Live, a rolling four-hour block of pre-recorded local news, sport and features airing each weeknight from 5-9 pm as well as RedArmyTV, a 30-minute independently produced football fan TV show about Middlesbrough FC – broadcast at 7.30 pm on Friday's RedArmyTV is produced by Teesside-based TV production company XCel Broadcast. A half-hour regional block also airs on the generic Made Television networked feed on digital satellite each weekday evening at 7.30 pm.

Programmes produced by the other Local TV Ltd stations also air on the channel along with acquired programming from independent producers and other broadcasters around the UK, including the thrice-daily programming blocks, originally from CBS Reality and since the start of 2023, from TalkTV, airing from 9-11 am, 1-5 pm and 9 pm-2 am.
