= Cristo Foufas =

Radio personality

Cristo Foufas is a TV presenter for GB News in the United Kingdom. He has previously worked for TalkTV, LBC, ITV, BBC London, Purple Radio, Foxy Radio, and as a reporter at Galaxy and Radio Aire.

He was previously a producer on Loose Women.

== Early life and background ==
Cristo Antonios Foufas was born in the United Kingdom to a Greek father and British actress Jane Foufas nee Morgan in 1977 in St. Albans. He has openly identified as gay and has discussed personal experiences, including his struggles with weight and self-acceptance, in media interviews.

== Career ==
=== Radio ===
Foufas began his career in radio, working as a reporter and presenter for stations such as Galaxy, Radio Aire, and Purple Radio. He later joined BBC London 94.9 FM, where he co-presented the overnight show with Ruth Barnes for six months in 2006. His tenure at LBC 97.3 marked a significant period in his career, hosting entertainment-focused weekend shows, including Saturday and Sunday Night Live with Cristo. In 2016, he stepped down from his regular LBC role but continued to contribute as a fill-in host and showbiz reporter across LBC, LBC News 1152, Heart 106.2, and Galaxy.

Foufas transitioned to TalkRadio (later rebranded as TalkTV), replacing Iain Lee, and has since established himself as a prominent voice in British talk radio. He has interviewed notable figures such as Madonna, Johnny Depp, and Amy Winehouse during his radio career.

=== Television ===
In addition to radio, Foufas has worked in television as a producer and presenter. He served as a producer on ITV’s Loose Women and contributed to morning shows such as This Morning and The Big Breakfast, where he also worked as a celebrity booker. He has appeared as a showbiz commentator on Fox News, offering insights on entertainment and royal topics. Since joining TalkTV, Foufas has expanded his presence as a television presenter.

=== Writing and Other Work ===
Foufas has contributed articles to publications such as The Telegraph, The Guardian, and The i Paper, often reflecting on personal experiences and social issues. In a 2020 piece for inews.co.uk, he discussed his lifelong battle with weight, noting, “I’ve gained and lost a hundred stone... but I’m happy,” highlighting a shift toward mental well-being over physical appearance.

== Personal life ==
Foufas is in a long-term relationship with his partner, Shukerbeg, a model active on Instagram. The couple is not married, and Foufas frequently shares aspects of their relationship on social media. He is also known for his love of dogs and has described himself as a “serial complainer” with a politically independent stance.
