= Julia Hartley-Brewer =

British radio presenter (born 1968)

- Born: 2 May 1968 (age 58); Birmingham, England
- Education: Magdalen College, Oxford; Cardiff University
- Occupations: Radio presenter, journalist, columnist
- Years active: 1990s–present
- Spouse: Rob Walton (m. 2006)
- Children: 1

Julia Hartley-Brewer (born 2 May 1968) is an English political journalist, newspaper columnist and radio presenter. She hosted the mid-morning show on Talk called Talk. Nation until November 2026.

== Early life and education ==
Hartley-Brewer is the daughter of Michael Hartley-Brewer, who stood as the Labour Party's candidate in Selly Oak in the 1970 general election and Dudley West in the 1979 general election, and Valerie Forbes Hartley-Brewer. Her parents divorced, and her mother trained as a general practitioner while bringing up two children.

Hartley-Brewer was educated at Oldfield School (formerly Oldfield Girl's School) in Bath and Woodhouse College in Finchley, North London. She gained a degree in philosophy, politics and economics at Magdalen College, Oxford in 1988.

== Career ==
Hartley-Brewer began her career in journalism at the East London Advertiser in Bethnal Green, east London. Later, she was a news reporter and political correspondent for the London Evening Standard and then joined The Guardian, staying until September 2000. She moved to the Sunday Express as political correspondent, becoming political editor from 2001 until 2007 and then assistant editor (politics).

In 2006, she presented and narrated two political documentaries for BBC Two and BBC Four television about the history of British Deputy Prime Ministers, called Every Prime Minister Needs a Willie, and the history of the Leader of the Opposition, called The Worst Job in Politics.

She was an LBC presenter from February 2011, until she left in December 2014 to be replaced by Shelagh Fogarty.

Hartley-Brewer broadcast on Talkradio, a radio station owned by Rupert Murdoch's News Corp. She presented the mid-morning weekday show from March 2016 until 15 January 2018, when she moved to host the weekday breakfast show from 6.30am to 10am. She left Talk on 19 November 2026, with the mid-morning slot being taken over by Alex Phillips.

She has written opinion articles and columns for The Daily Telegraph.

=== Broadcast guest appearances ===
She has appeared as a panellist on the comedy quiz show Have I Got News for You ten times, as well as being a regular panellist on BBC One's Question Time.

She was a contestant on Pointless Celebrities in October 2014, winning the prize for her chosen charity.

== Political beliefs and views ==
Hartley-Brewer was a long-standing supporter of Brexit during the campaign in 2016. In March 2019, Hartley-Brewer spoke at the Leave Means Leave rally in Parliament Square, London.

She is an atheist and an honorary associate of the National Secular Society. In 2015, after Pope Francis issued the encyclical Laudato si', calling for "swift and unified global action" on environmental degradation and global warming, Hartley-Brewer wrote in The Daily Telegraph stating: "What the head of an anti-science body like the Catholic Church says about climate change is about as relevant as Kim Kardashian on the eurozone."

At the Oxford University PPE Society in 2018, Hartley-Brewer gave a talk on "Political Correctness and Free Speech", in which she argued that political correctness has damaged the ability to freely express political views. Hartley-Brewer is on the advisory council of the Free Speech Union.

Hartley-Brewer has been referred to as "anti-trans" and "right-wing", particularly by Nick Duffy of PinkNews, who reported that on 30 November 2018 Hartley-Brewer threatened to remove a guest from the Talkradio studio during a discussion on trans issues because the guest used the term "cis."

The Royal College of General Practitioners invited her to speak in an "NHS Question Time" debate in 2019 but withdrew the invitation after 700 GPs signed a petition complaining that her views were not conducive to the work they were doing to promote inclusivity within the profession and among patients. They cited, among other things, a deleted tweet from 2016, in which Hartley-Brewer said "Powell wasn't a racist" and "I'm not defending Powell, I just don't see anything in the Rivers speech that he got wrong", in reference to MP Enoch Powell and his 1968 "Rivers of Blood" speech, in which he said that by allowing an increasing number of non-white immigrants into the country, England was "heaping up its own funeral pyre".

In December 2022, Hartley-Brewer referred to environmental activist Greta Thunberg's autism in a tweet, following Thunberg's criticism of internet personality Andrew Tate. The tweet was reposted without mentioning autism. Hartley-Brewer stated in the original and re-posted tweet that she would "choose Andrew Tate's life *every single time*" over Thunberg's. This was mocked online when, a day after the tweet, Tate was arrested on suspicion of human trafficking, rape, and forming an organised crime group.

=== Incidents ===
In 2017, Hartley-Brewer alleged that the then Defence Secretary, Sir Michael Fallon, had repeatedly touched her knee throughout a dinner in 2002; the allegation contributed to his eventual resignation.

In 2016, Hartley-Brewer said Owen Jones had "more in common with ISIS than he thinks" on Sky News after Jones walked out of an interview on it following host Mark Longhurst's refusal to refer to the Orlando nightclub shooting as an assault on LGBT people. Hartley-Brewer said, "neither the Sky presenter Mark Longhurst nor I said anything that was offensive, wrong or bigoted in any way" and that she would not apologise to Jones. By the following day, Ofcom had received 60 complaints from viewers who said Hartley-Brewer and Longhurst were dismissive of Jones's argument.

In August 2018, she sent a tweet containing a photo of the aftermath of the 1998 Omagh bombing with text saying that Jeremy Corbyn had paid tribute to the victims of the bombing, "including the Real IRA bombers who may have snagged a nail while planting the explosives". The tweet was criticised as insensitive by Michael Gallagher, whose son Aidan was killed. He said her tweet was "poorly timed". Writer Lisa McGee and journalist David Blevins criticised the use of the photo. She defended her tweet as satire.

In October 2019, Jolyon Maugham accused Hartley-Brewer of revealing his home address at a time when he was receiving death threats. Hartley-Brewer defended herself by saying Maugham's address was already easily available online and that he had previously revealed it in published interviews.

In April 2021, Ofcom received over 200 complaints accusing Hartley-Brewer of trivialising racism following a TV appearance on This Morning in which Hartley-Brewer commented on a family portrait of Queen Elizabeth II and Prince Philip taken in 2018, posing with seven of their great-grandchildren, saying: "I wonder if Meghan has managed to take offence to this photograph that doesn't include her son. Well she probably thinks it's a racist photograph, taken before her son was even conceived". Prince Archie, the son of Meghan and Prince Harry, was born in 2019.

In 2024, during an interview with Mustafa Barghouti, a Palestinian politician, Hartley was accused of shouting over the top of her guest and repeatedly interrupting Barghouti. She stated, "Maybe you're not used to women talking, I don't know, but I'd like to finish the sentence!" In response, Ofcom received 17,366 complaints about Hartley's conduct, making it the most complained-about UK programme in 2024.

On 14 April 2024, in the wake of the Bondi Junction stabbings in Sydney, before the suspect had been identified, Hartley-Brewer tweeted "Another day. Another terror attack by another Islamic terrorist". The press condemned this and other misinformation that had been spread about the attacker. She deleted it after it had been viewed more than nine million times. The perpetrator, Joel Cauchi, was not Muslim.

== Personal life ==
Hartley-Brewer married Rob Walton in 2006. They have one daughter.
