= Local TV Bristol =

LOCAL TV Bristol
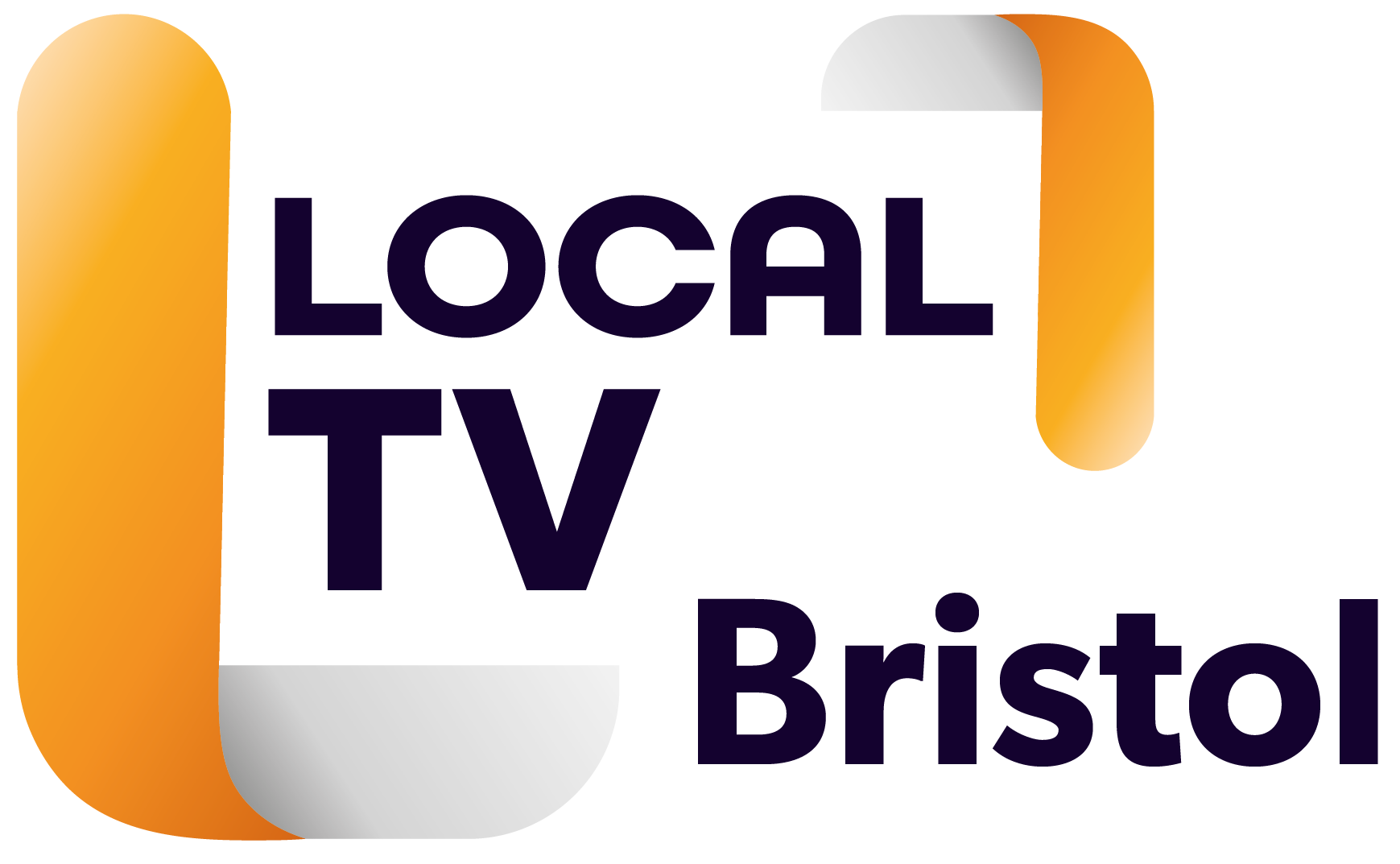
- Country: United Kingdom
- Broadcast area: Bristol

Programming
- Picture format: 576i (16:9 SDTV)

Ownership
- Owner: Local Television Limited
- Sister channels: Local TV Birmingham; Local TV Leeds; Local TV Liverpool; Local TV North Wales; Local TV Teesside; Local TV Cardiff; Local TV Tyne & Wear

History
- Launched: 8 October 2014
- Former names: Made in Bristol; Bristol TV; Local TV Bristol

Links
- Website: uklocal.tv/localtv-bristol/

Availability

Terrestrial
- Freeview: Channel 7

LOCAL TV Bristol
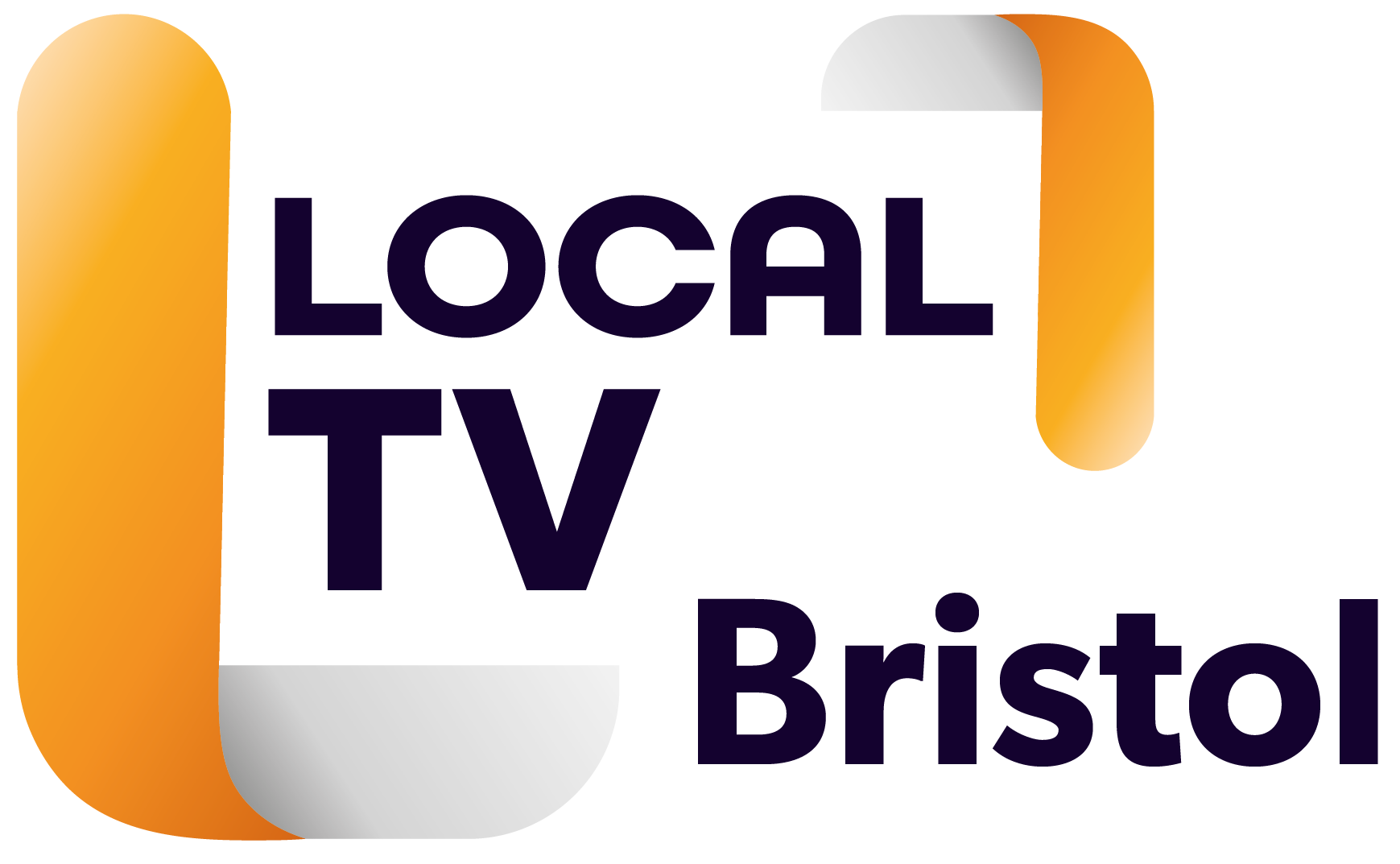

Bristol; United Kingdom
- Channels: Digital: 7 (Freeview)

Programming
- Affiliations: Local TV

Ownership
- Owner: Local Television Limited
- Sister stations: Local TV Birmingham; Local TV Leeds; Liverpool TV; North Wales TV; Local TV Teesside; Local TV Cardiff; Local TV Tyne & Wear

History
- First air date: 8 October 2014
- Former names: Made in Bristol; Bristol TV; Local TV Bristol

Technical information
- Licensing authority: Ofcom

Local TV Bristol is a British local television channel serving Bristol and surrounding areas, which broadcasts on Freeview on channel 7 from the Mendip transmitter. The station is one of nine owned and operated by Local TV Limited.

== Overview ==
In September 2012, the broadcast regulator Ofcom announced Made Television had been awarded a licence to broadcast the local TV service for the Bristol area, serving a potential audience of around 330,000. The company was unopposed in bidding for the licence.

The station began broadcasting on Freeview, Sky and Virgin Media platforms at 8pm on 8 October 2014; it was the first of Made TV's stations to be launched. After three months on air, Made in Bristol claimed a weekly audience of around 168,000 viewers.

Since August 2015, the station has also been streaming live online via its website. On 5 April 2016, Made in Bristol moved from Freeview channel 8 to Freeview channel 7.

In February 2017, a revamp of the station's local output led to the launch of a flagship two-hour live magazine show on weeknights, The Crunch Bristol, incorporating news, sport, current affairs and entertainment.

On 25 May 2017, Made in Bristol and its sister channels began carrying acquired programming from the UK & Ireland version of factual entertainment channel TruTV as part of a supply agreement with Sony Pictures Television. The station simulcasts TruTV in two daily blocks from 1pm to 5pm and from 9pm to 1am (8pm to midnight on Tuesdays to accommodate America's Got Talent). In November 2017, the Made network began simulcasting CBS Reality for eleven hours a day.

In November 2017, following a restructuring of the Made network's operations, The Crunch Bristol was axed, local output was cut and studio production of daily news and magazine programmes was transferred to other Made TV stations.

On 2 January 2018, Made in Bristol ceased broadcasting on digital satellite and was replaced by a generic Made Television networked feed featuring a daily three-hour block of local news programming for six of the network's licence areas, including Bristol.

In January 2022, Ofcom approved a request by the channel to close its Bristol offices and move permanently to a remote production model implemented during the COVID-19 pandemic, with content sent electronically to Local TV's broadcast centre in Leeds for playout.

On 18 October 2023, the station was rebranded as TalkBristol, aligning themselves with News UK's TalkTV television channel with provided the majority of their programming during the day, excepting the three hours in the daytime when local news was broadcast. The branding reverted to Local TV Bristol shortly before TalkTV retrenched to an online-only service in April 2024.

== Programming ==
Bristol TV is required to broadcast 37 hours a week of first-run programming.

As of February 2018, the station's sole local programme is Bristol Live, a rolling four-hour block of pre-recorded local news, sport and features airing each weeknight from 5-9pm. A half-hour block also airs on the generic Made Television networked feed on digital satellite each weekday evening at 5.30pm.

Programmes produced by the other Made TV stations also aired on the channel along with acquired programming from independent producers and other broadcasters around the UK, including the thrice-daily programming blocks from CBS Reality - airing from 9-11am, 1-5pm and 9pm-2am.

In 2023, the channel started simulcasting TalkTV's news programmes during the day, with hour-long local news bulletins at 1pm, 6pm and 9pm (which were also looped overnight).
