= City8 =

Cancelled local television channel in Birmingham, England

- Country: United Kingdom

Programming
- Picture format: 576i (16:9 SDTV)

Ownership
- Owner: BLTV Ltd

History
- Launched: November 2014 (proposed)

Availability (proposed)

Terrestrial
- Freeview: Channel 8

City8 was a proposed local television channel in Birmingham that was scheduled to launch in November 2014 but went out of business before that date.

== History ==
In 2010, Ofcom announced that local TV would be introduced in the United Kingdom.

In May 2012, a round of bidding was held for local TV licences. There were four applicants for the Birmingham area: City TV Broadcasting, Bham TV, Made in Birmingham and YourTV Birmingham. In November 2012, City TV Broadcasting Ltd won the local TV franchise for Birmingham.

On 19 February 2014, the channel's name was changed from City TV to City8 ahead of launch.

On 8 August, City8's owner BLTV went into administration, having been unable to secure sufficient funding for the channel. The licence was transferred to another operator.

== Programming ==
City8 intended to broadcast a breakfast show, a music show, a news programme and a sports programme.

== See also ==
- Local television in the United Kingdom
