= Leeds TV =

Television station based in Leeds, England

Local TV Leeds
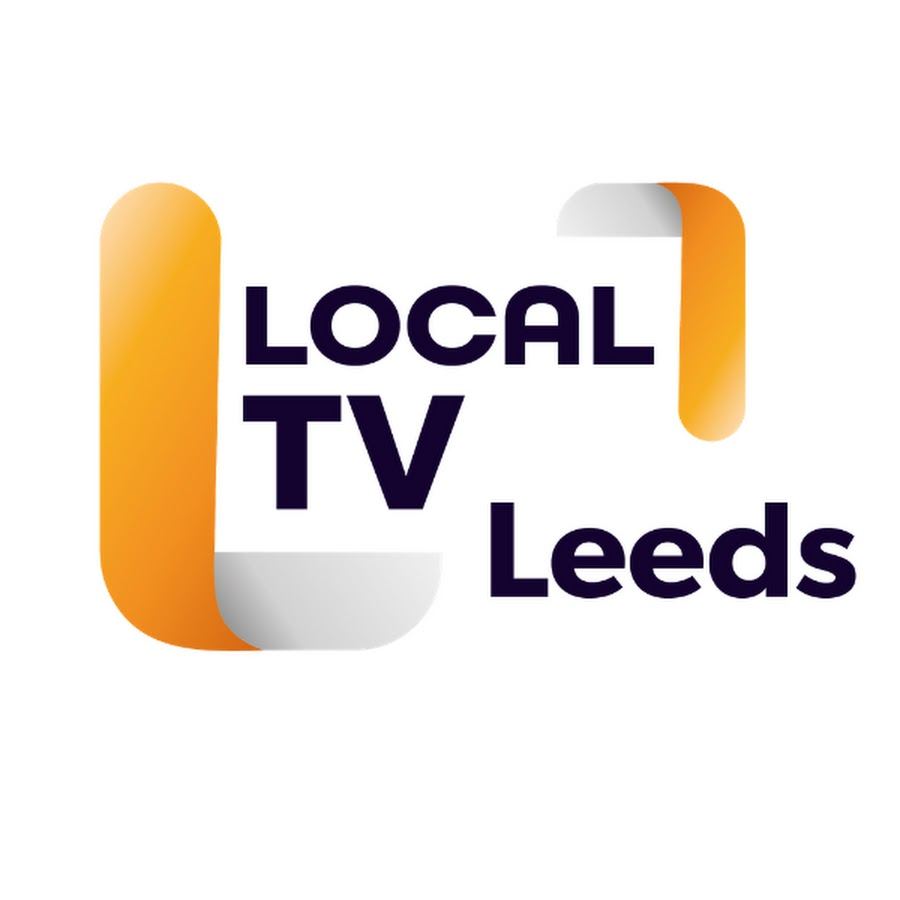
- Country: United Kingdom
- Broadcast area: Leeds
- Headquarters: Leeds Media & Broadcasting Centre, Chapeltown, Leeds

Programming
- Picture format: 576i (16:9 SDTV)

Ownership
- Owner: Local Television Limited
- Sister channels: Local TV Birmingham; Local TV Bristol; Local TV Liverpool; Local TV North Wales; Local TV Teesside; Local TV Cardiff; Local TV Tyne & Wear

History
- Launched: 6 November 2014
- Former names: Made in Leeds; Leeds TV

Links
- Website: www.leedslocal.tv

Availability

Terrestrial
- Freeview: Channel 7

Local TV Leeds
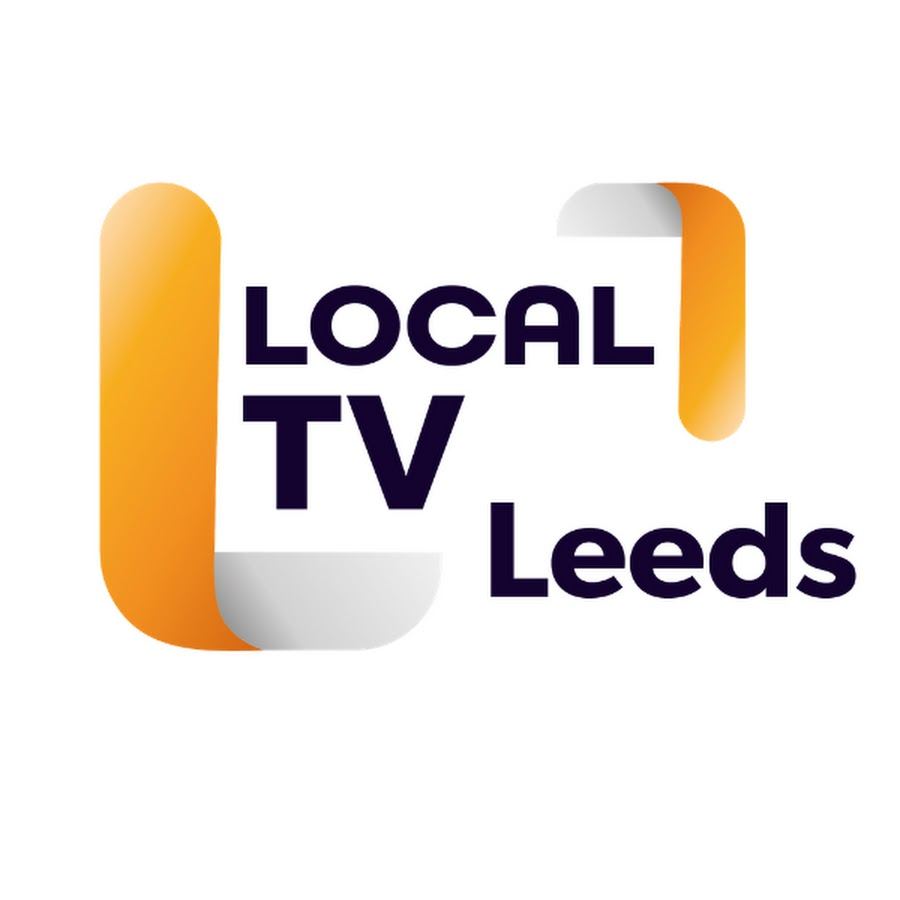

Leeds; United Kingdom
- Channels: Digital: 7 (Freeview)

Programming
- Affiliations: Local TV

Ownership
- Owner: Local Television Limited
- Sister stations: Local TV Birmingham; Local TV Bristol; Local TV Liverpool; Local TV North Wales; Local TV Teesside; Local TV Cardiff; Local TV Tyne & Wear

History
- First air date: 6 November 2014
- Former names: Made in Leeds; Leeds TV

Technical information
- Licensing authority: Ofcom

Local TV Leeds (formerly known by the names of TalkLeeds, Leeds TV and Made in Leeds) is a local television station serving Leeds and West Yorkshire. The station is owned and operated by Local Television Limited and forms part of a group of eight Local TV stations. It broadcasts from studios and offices in the Chapeltown area of Leeds.

== Overview ==
In February 2013, the broadcast regulator OFCOM announced Made Television had been awarded a licence to broadcast the local TV service for Leeds and West Yorkshire, serving a potential audience of 3.5 million viewers - the largest footprint in the Made TV network.

In May 2012, media regulator Ofcom extended the invitation for local operators in cities across the United Kingdom to operate a new local television service in their area. There were four other bids for the licence - Leeds TV (a group including Leeds United), Metro8 Leeds, 'NORTH' and YourTV Leeds.

The channel began broadcasting on Freeview, Sky and Virgin Media platforms on 6 November 2014, following the launches of Made TV's Bristol and Cardiff stations the previous month. After three months on air, Made in Leeds claimed a weekly audience of around 431,000 viewers. In March 2016 the station claimed a monthly audience of 715,000 viewers.

Since August 2015, the station has also been streaming live online via its website. On 5 April 2016, Made in Leeds moved from Freeview channel 8 to Freeview channel 7.

On Thursday 25 May 2017, Made in Leeds and its sister channels began carrying acquired programming from the UK & Ireland version of factual entertainment channel TruTV as part of a supply agreement with Sony Pictures Television. The station simulcasts TruTV in two daily blocks from 1-5pm and from 9pm-1am (8pm - midnight on Tuesdays to accommodate America's Got Talent). As of November 2017, the Made network simulcasts CBS Reality for eleven hours a day.

On 2 January 2018, Made in Leeds ceased broadcasting on digital satellite and was replaced by a generic Made Television networked feed featuring a daily three-hour block of local news programming for six of the network's licence areas, including Leeds.

This station broadcasts on Freeview on channel 7 from the Emley Moor transmitter.

== Programming ==
Leeds TV is required to broadcast 37 hours a week of first-run local programming.

As of February 2018, the station's sole local programme is Yorkshire Live, a rolling four-hour block of pre-recorded local news, sport and features airing each weeknight from 5-9pm. A half-hour block also airs on the generic Made Television networked feed on digital satellite each weekday evening.

Programmes produced by the other Local TV Ltd stations also air on the channel along with acquired programming from independent producers and other broadcasters around the UK, including the thrice-daily programming blocks, originally from CBS Reality and since the start of 2023, from TalkTV, airing from 9-11am, 1-5pm and 9pm-2am.

== Awards ==
| Year | Association | Category | Nominee(s) | Result |
|---|---|---|---|---|
| 2016 | Royal Television Society Awards | Best News Report | On the Aire | Won |
| 2016 | Royal Television Society Awards | One To Watch | Mark O'Brien | Won |
| 2016 | Royal Television Society Awards | Best Reporter | Mark Kielesz-Levine | Nominated |
| 2016 | Royal Television Society Awards | Best Reporter | Matt Millington | Nominated |
| 2016 | O2 Media Awards | Best Team | Made in Leeds | Won |
| 2017 | Royal Television Society Awards | News or Current Affairs Journalist | Mark Kielesz-Levine | Won |
