= North Wales TV =

British local TV channel

LOCAL TV North Wales
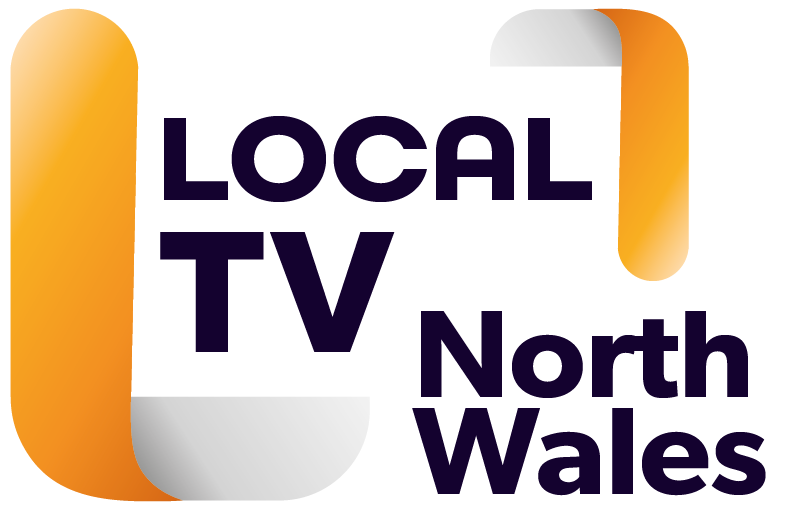
- Logo of North Wales TV
- Country: United Kingdom
- Broadcast area: Mold, Denbigh, Ruthin and surrounding areas
- Headquarters: Mold, Flintshire, North Wales

Programming
- Picture format: 576i (16:9 SDTV)

Ownership
- Owner: Local Television Limited
- Sister channels: Local TV Birmingham; Local TV Bristol; Local TV Leeds; Local TV Liverpool; Local TV Teesside; Local TV Cardiff; Local TV Tyne & Wear

History
- Launched: 26 April 2017
- Former names: Made in North Wales; North Wales TV

Availability

Terrestrial
- Freeview: Channel 8

Local TV North Wales
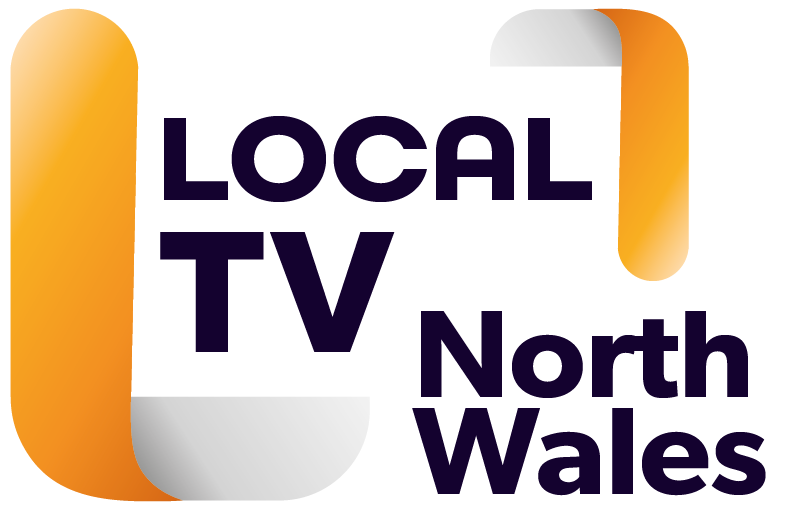

North Wales; United Kingdom
- Channels: Digital: 8 (Freeview)

Programming
- Affiliations: Local TV

Ownership
- Owner: Local Television Limited
- Sister stations: Local TV Birmingham; Local TV Bristol; Local TV Liverpool; Local TV Leeds; Local TV Teesside; Local TV Cardiff; Local TV Tyne & Wear

History
- First air date: 26 April 2017
- Former names: Made in North Wales; North Wales TV

Technical information
- Licensing authority: Ofcom

LOCAL TV North Wales (formerly North Wales TV, Made in North Wales and TalkNorth Wales) is a British local television station serving Mold, Denbigh, Ruthin and surrounding areas. The station is owned and operated by Local Television Limited and forms part of a group of eight Local TV channels.

The station's local production office is in Wrexham.

== Overview ==
In January 2014, the broadcast regulator OFCOM announced it had awarded Bay TV a licence to broadcast the local TV service for Mold and surrounding areas - one of the smallest licences of its kind in the UK. The Mold licence had also been contested by a locally based group known as Serch TV Mold.

A year before, the owners of Bay TV Clwyd had already secured a licence for the Liverpool area, but the company was denied a licence to run a service for the Bangor area of Gwynedd, amid concerns about the viability of the proposed station.

Bay TV Clwyd was due to start broadcasting in October 2014, but the company said it had faced long delays because of problems with the Moel-y-Parc transmitter. Bay TV's Liverpool service began broadcasting in December 2014, but fell into administration in August 2016. It was sold to Made Television shortly afterwards and ceased broadcasting two months later before it was relaunched as Made in Liverpool.

In March 2017, Made Television announced it had acquired the Mold licence and would launch the service as Made in North Wales the following month. The station opened at 6pm on Wednesday 26 April 2017, broadcasting on Freeview channel 8.

Prior to its launch, the Welsh Language Society (Cymdeithas yr Iaith Gymraeg) accused the station of producing its local programming from Liverpool and pledging a single half-hour weekly programme in the Welsh language. In response, the company said it had hired production staff to work from Mold and the channel was linked to the Liverpool studios as part of its infrastructure. The channel's local offices were later transferred to Wrexham and in November 2017, production of local programmes was transferred to other Made TV stations.

On Thursday 25 May 2017, Made in North Wales and its sister channels began carrying acquired programming from the UK & Ireland version of factual entertainment channel TruTV as part of a supply agreement with Sony Pictures Television. The station simulcasts TruTV in two daily blocks from 1-5pm and from 9pm-1am (8pm - midnight on Tuesdays to accommodate America's Got Talent). As of November 2017, the Made network simulcasts CBS Reality for eleven hours a day.

== Programming ==
North Wales TV is required to broadcast an average of six hours and 42 minutes a week of first-run local programming.

As of February 2018, the station's sole local programme is North Wales Live, a rolling block of pre-recorded local news, sport and features airing each weeknight from 6-9pm.

A weekly half-hour programme in the Welsh language, Made Cymraeg, airs on Sunday afternoons and programmes produced by the other Local TV Ltd stations also air on the channel along with acquired programming from independent producers and other broadcasters around the UK, including the thrice-daily programming blocks, originally from CBS Reality and since the start of 2023, from TalkTV, airing from 9-11am, 1-5pm and 9pm-2am.
