= Local television in the United Kingdom =

Local television in the United Kingdom, described in legislation as Local Digital Television Programme Services (L-DTPS), provides a television station for a specific local area. Successful applicants are awarded a sole licence for their chosen area, and are expected to locate their studios within the same area. They broadcast on the digital terrestrial (DTT) system, as used by the national Freeview service.

The independent regulator, Ofcom, invites applications in all areas where transmission is technically possible, and assesses proposals against the statutory criteria.

== Availability ==
The multiplexes carrying the stations are operated by Comux, owned by the local TV broadcasters, with operations run by Canis Media.

In England and Northern Ireland, the local channels were on channel 8 and in Scotland and Wales they were originally given channel 45; however, after a number of channel closures, channel 23 was used. Following the closure of BBC Three, the local stations moved to channel 7 in England and Northern Ireland, and channel 8 in Scotland and Wales. Some local stations in England however are broadcast on Channel 8 for other reasons. Some stations are also available (in their local areas) via cable (Virgin Media) channel 159 and satellite (Sky) channel 117 (channel 134 in Wales because channel 117 is already occupied). Channels 168, 169 and 209 (previously 216) were used if a region wants multiple local TV channels on Sky before 1 May 2018.

== Phase 1 ==
In May 2012, Ofcom invited bids for local TV services in selected areas.

Primary location	Transmitter	Winning operator	Launch date	Other bids
Aberdeen	Durris	STV2 (Aberdeen)	24 April 2017	
Ayr	Darvel	STV2 (Ayr)	24 April 2017	
Basingstoke	Hannington	That's Hampshire	23 May 2017	
Birmingham	Sutton Coldfield	Big Centre TV	28 February 2015	Bham TV, Made in Birmingham, YourTV Birmingham
Brighton and Hove	Whitehawk Hill	Latest TV	28 August 2014	none
Bristol	Mendip	Made in Bristol	8 October 2014	none
Cambridge	Sandy Heath	That's Cambridge	18 August 2015	none
Carlisle	Caldbeck	That's Carlisle	25 July 2017	
Cardiff	Wenvoe	Made in Cardiff	15 October 2014	Cardiff Local TV
Dundee	Angus	STV2 (Dundee)	24 April 2017	
Edinburgh	Craigkelly	STV Edinburgh	12 January 2015	Edinburgh News Network, Made in Edinburgh, Metro8 Edinburgh
Glasgow	Black Hill	STV Glasgow	2 June 2014	Glasgow TV, Made in Glasgow, Metro8 Glasgow
Grimsby	Belmont	Estuary TV	26 November 2013	none
Guildford	Guildford	That's Surrey	2 August 2017	
Leeds	Emley Moor	Made in Leeds	6 November 2014	Leeds TV, Metro8 Leeds, NORTH, YourTV Leeds
Liverpool	Winter Hill Storeton	Bay TV Liverpool	4 December 2014	Made in Liverpool, Metro8 Liverpool, Our-TV, YourTV Liverpool
London	Crystal Palace, Croydon, Hemel Hempstead	London TV	31 March 2014	London8, LondonTV, Made in London, YourTV London
Maidstone/Tonbridge	Bluebell Hill	KMTV	11 July 2017	TVKent
Manchester	Winter Hill	That's Manchester	31 May 2015	Made in Manchester, Manchester News Channel, MCR TV, Metro8 Manchester, YourTV Manchester
Middlesbrough	Bilsdale	Made in Teesside	30 March 2017	TeesVision
Mold	Moel-y-Parc	Made in North Wales		Serch TV Mold
Norwich	Tacolneston	Mustard TV	24 March 2014	NR ONE
Nottingham	Waltham Nottingham	Notts TV	27 May 2014	Television Nottingham
Newcastle/Sunderland	Pontop Pike	Made in Tyne & Wear	12 November 2014	Metro8 Newcastle, NEON-TV, YourTV Newcastle
Oxford	Oxford	That's Oxfordshire	17 April 2015	Oxford 8
Preston/Blackpool	Winter Hill	That's Lancashire	24 August 2015	Metro8 Preston, YourTV Blackpool & Preston
Reading	Hannington	That's Thames Valley	3 May 2017	
Salisbury	Salisbury	That's Salisbury	19 July 2017	
Scarborough	Oliver's Mount	That's North Yorkshire	1 August 2017	
Sheffield	Sheffield	Sheffield Live TV	23 September 2014	Metro8 Sheffield, YourTV Sheffield
Southampton/Portsmouth	Rowridge	That's Solent	26 November 2014	TV Solent
Swansea	Kilvey Hill	That's Swansea Bay	12 July 2016	Love Swansea
York	Emley Moor	That's York	26 June 2017	none

In August 2012, 57 applications were received to provide these services. Bristol, Brighton & Hove and Grimsby attracted only one bid each. Plymouth and Swansea received no bids from potential broadcasters.

† The owners of Birmingham licence City8 went into administration before the channel launched. The licence was re-awarded to another operator, Big Centre TV.

== Phase 2 ==
In March 2013, Ofcom announced that more areas had been selected to invite bids for local television services, in addition to re-advertising the previously un-awarded Swansea and Plymouth locations.

Primary location	Transmitter	Winning operator	Launch date	Other bids
Bangor	Llanddona	not awarded		Bay TV Gwynedd
Bedford	Sandy Heath	not awarded		
Bromsgrove	Bromsgrove	not awarded		
Derry	Londonderry	not awarded		
Hereford	Ridge Hill	It's Hereford	01/02/2018	
Inverness	Rosemarkie	not awarded		ICTV (Moray Firth Media Trust)
Kidderminster	Kidderminster	not awarded		
Limavady		not awarded		
Lincolnshire	Belmont	That's Lincolnshire		
Luton	Sandy Heath	not awarded		
Malvern	Malvern	not awarded		
Plymouth	Caradon Hill	That's Plymouth		
Stoke-on-Trent	Fenton	not awarded		Bay TV Stoke
Stratford-upon-Avon	Lark Stoke	Upon 8		

== Local TV variations in 2021 ==
As of February 2021, That's TV broadcast as a semi-national network (one which also uses the That's Christmas or That's New Year name over festive periods) with a local opt-out at 6pm for regional news, and a service streaming to the whole country via the VisionTV platform on channel 264 (which includes extra pop videos rather than the local news). Local Television Limited has nine licences in the United Kingdom, eight branded as Local TV operating as part as the Local Digital Television Programme, while the ninth – Manchester TV on the Greater Manchester multiplex – is separately licensed.

NorDig LCN	DVB name	Notes	Licensee/ Parent Company	Broadcast hours	H.222 Transport	Format
7	Local TV Birmingham	Birmingham and surrounding areas.	Local Television Limited	24 hours	LTVmux	16:9 SDTV
7	Local TV Bristol	Bristol and surrounding areas.	Local Television Limited	24 hours	LTVmux	16:9 SDTV
8	Local TV Cardiff	Cardiff and surrounding areas.	Local Television Limited	24 hours	LTVmux	16:9 SDTV
7	KMTV	Maidstone and surrounding areas.	KMTV Ltd	24 hours	LTVmux	16:9 SDTV
7	Latest TV	Brighton and surrounding areas.	Latest TV Ltd	24 hours	LTVmux	16:9 SDTV
7	Local TV Leeds	Leeds and surrounding areas.	Local Television Limited	24 hours	LTVmux	16:9 SDTV
7	Local TV Liverpool	Liverpool and surrounding areas.	Local Television Limited	24 hours	LTVmux	16:9 SDTV
8	London Live	London and surrounding areas.	ESTV	24 hours	LTVmux	16:9 SDTV
8	Local TV North Wales	Mold, Denbigh, Ruthin, and surrounding areas.	Local Television Limited	24 hours	LTVmux	16:9 SDTV
7	NVTV	Belfast and surrounding areas.	Northern Visions Ltd	24 hours	LTVmux	16:9 SDTV
7	Sheffield Live!	Sheffield and surrounding areas.	Sheffield Live TV	24 hours	LTVmux	16:9 SDTV
7	Local TV Teesside	Middlesbrough, Teesside and surrounding areas.	Local Television Limited	24 hours	LTVmux	16:9 SDTV
7	That's Cambridge	Cambridge and surrounding areas.	That's Television Ltd	24 hours	LTVmux	16:9 SDTV
7	That's Cumbria	Carlisle and surrounding areas.	That's Television Ltd	24 hours	LTVmux	16:9 SDTV
7	That's Hampshire	Basingstoke and surrounding areas.	That's Television Ltd	24 hours	LTVmux	16:9 SDTV
7	That's Humber	Grimsby, Hull and surrounding areas.	That's Television Ltd	24 hours	LTVmux	16:9 SDTV
7	That's Lancashire	Preston and surrounding areas.	That's Television Ltd	24 hours	LTVmux	16:9 SDTV
7	That's Manchester	Greater Manchester and surrounding areas.	That's Television Ltd	24 hours	LTVmux	16:9 SDTV
7	That's North Yorkshire	Scarborough and surrounding areas.	That's Television Ltd	24 hours	LTVmux	16:9 SDTV
7	That's Oxfordshire	Oxford and surrounding areas.	That's Television Ltd	24 hours	LTVmux	16:9 SDTV
7	That's Salisbury	Salisbury and surrounding areas.	That's Television Ltd	24 hours	LTVmux	16:9 SDTV
7	That's Scarborough	Scarborough and surrounding areas.	That's Television Ltd	24 hours	LTVmux	16:9 SDTV
8	That's Scotland	Aberdeen, Ayr, Dundee, Edinburgh, Glasgow, and surrounding areas.	That's Television Ltd	24 hours	LTVmux	16:9 SDTV
7	That's Solent	Portsmouth, Southampton and surrounding areas.	That's Television Ltd	24 hours	LTVmux	16:9 SDTV
7	That's Surrey	Guildford and surrounding areas.	That's Television Ltd	24 hours	LTVmux	16:9 SDTV
7	That's Swansea Bay	Swansea and surrounding areas.	That's Television Ltd	24 hours	LTVmux	16:9 SDTV
7	That's Thames Valley	Reading and surrounding areas.	That's Television Ltd	24 hours	LTVmux	16:9 SDTV
7	That's Norfolk	Norwich and surrounding areas.	That's Television Ltd	24 hours	LTVmux	16:9 SDTV
7	That's York	York and surrounding areas.	That's Television Ltd	24 hours	LTVmux	16:9 SDTV
7	Local TV Tyne & Wear	Tyne & Wear and surrounding areas.	Local Television Limited	24 hours	LTVmux	16:9 SDTV
99	Manchester TV	Manchester's second local channel after That's Manchester is licensed like a standard channel alongside services like Now 90s and Clubland and so is not part of the Local Digital Television Programme.	Local Television Limited	24 hours	GImux	16:9 SDTV

== See also ==
- Timeline of local television in the UK
