= Local TV Limited =

Local television network in the United Kingdom

Local TV
- Country: United Kingdom
- Broadcast area: Bristol; Cardiff; Leeds and West Yorkshire; London (as London TV); Liverpool; Birmingham; West Midlands; Teesside; Tyne and Wear
- Headquarters: Leeds

Ownership
- Owner: Local TV Ltd
- Sister channels: Local TV Birmingham; Local TV Bristol; Local TV Leeds; Local TV Liverpool; Local TV North Wales; Local TV Teesside; Local TV Cardiff; Local TV Tyne & Wear; London TV

History
- Launched: Bristol: 8 October 2014; 11 years ago; Cardiff: 15 October 2014; 11 years ago; Leeds: 6 November 2014; 11 years ago; Tyne and Wear: 12 November 2014; 11 years ago; Liverpool: 12 October 2016; 9 years ago; Birmingham: 8 November 2016; 9 years ago; Teesside: 30 March 2017; 9 years ago; North Wales: 26 April 2017; 8 years ago; London: 19 January 2025; 14 months ago
- Former names: Made Television (2014-2021)

Links
- Website: uklocal.tv

Local TV (formerly Made Television) is a local television network in the United Kingdom, operating nine channels serving the Birmingham, Bristol, Cardiff, Leeds, London, Liverpool, North Wales, Teesside and Tyne and Wear areas.

== Overview ==
=== 2012-2019 ===
In September 2012, the broadcast regulator Ofcom awarded two licences to Made Television to broadcast local TV services in the Bristol and Cardiff areas. Three months later, the company was granted a third licence to serve the Newcastle, Sunderland and Gateshead areas, followed in February 2013 by a licence for the Leeds area. In November 2013, the company gained a fifth local TV licence to serve the Middlesbrough and Teesside areas.

Made in Bristol was the first of the company's channels to launch, at 8 p.m. on Wednesday 8 October 2014, followed a week later by its sister station in Cardiff. Made in Leeds began broadcasting on Thursday 6 November 2014 and Made in Tyne & Wear launched six days later. The channels launched an on-demand service, OnView, in March 2015 followed in August by live streaming.

In 2016, the company bought two independently run local TV channels: Bay TV Liverpool, shortly after it went into administration in August, followed by Walsall-based Big Centre TV in October. Bay TV was reopened and relaunched as 'Made in Liverpool' at 6 p.m. on Wednesday 19 October 2016, followed by the relaunch of Big Centre as 'Made in Birmingham' on Tuesday 8 November 2016.

Two further channels launched during the spring of 2017 – Made in Teesside for the Middlesbrough area on Thursday 30 March 2017 followed by Made in North Wales for Mold and surrounding areas on Wednesday 26 April 2017.

On Thursday 25 May 2017, all Made channels began carrying acquired programming from the UK and Ireland version of factual entertainment channel TruTV as part of a supply agreement with Sony Pictures Television. The channels simulcast TruTV in two daily blocks from 13:00 to 17:00 and 21:00 to 01:00 (20:00 to 00:00 on Tuesdays to accommodate America's Got Talent). From November 2017, the Made channels began simulcasting CBS Reality for 11 hours a day.

In November 2017, following a restructuring of the Made network's operations, local programming was cut and studio production of daily news and magazine programmes was centralised at Made's Leeds and Birmingham channels. Around forty staff across the network were reportedly made redundant.

Following the cutbacks, the network began producing two weekday programmes - Made TV News (broadcast from Leeds) and The Big Daily (initially produced from Birmingham), both including local and networked content. Both programmes were axed in February 2018 and replaced by separate rolling blocks of pre-recorded local news, sport and features

On 2 January 2018, Made Television ceased broadcasting its localised services in Birmingham, Bristol, Leeds, Liverpool and Tyne & Wear on digital satellite. They were replaced by a single, generic Made Television feed featuring a daily three-hour block of local news programming. Made in Cardiff ceased broadcasting on all platforms and was replaced by the generic network feed.

The channels aired a block of localised news and sport alongside networked simulcasted programming from factual entertainment channel CBS Reality.

=== 2020 onwards ===
In January 2021, Local TV Limited began broadcasting a service targeting viewers in Manchester. Unlike the group's other channels, Manchester TV is not the official local-TV service provider; That's Manchester occupies the Comux local multiplex slot and LCN 7, with LTV's Manchester TV occupying a lower berth (LCN 99 at launch) and transmitting on the legacy Greater Manchester multiplex originally set up for the defunct Channel M service. When transmissions began, the channel relayed the network Local TV service as provided on satellite.

On 15 December 2021, Local TV Manchester abruptly closed on Freeview with the released space given to a Greater Manchester channel from On Demand 365.

In 2023, the channels started simulcasting TalkTV's news programmes during the day, with hour long local news bulletins at 13:00, 18:00 and 21:00 (which were also looped overnight) and it was later decided to rebrand all eight channels under the TalkTV name, a move which took place on 18 October 2023.

In 2024, the channels were rebranded back to their previous branding following the closure of TalkTV on broadcast television.

==== London TV ====
In January 2025, Local TV acquired the licence of London Live that broadcast to London and surrounding areas. London Live closed at 23:59 on 19 January and was replaced with London TV immediately afterwards.

== Local television services ==
Station	Studio-based	Coverage area	Transmitter
Local TV Birmingham (formerly TalkBirmingham)	Birmingham	Birmingham and the West Midlands	Sutton Coldfield
Local TV Bristol	Bristol	The Bristol area	Mendip
Local TV Cardiff	Cardiff	The Cardiff area	Wenvoe
Local TV Leeds	Leeds	Leeds and West Yorkshire	Emley Moor
London TV (formerly London Live)	London	Greater London area	Crystal Palace
Local TV Liverpool	Liverpool	Liverpool City Region	Storeton and Winter Hill
Local TV North Wales	Mold	Mold, Denbigh, Ruthin and surrounding areas	Moel y Parc
Local TV Teesside	Middlesbrough	Teesside	Bilsdale
Local TV Tyne & Wear (formerly Made in Tyne & Wear)	Newcastle	Tyne and Wear	Pontop Pike

== Satellite version ==
On 20 October 2021, all of the 5 Local TV versions on channel 117 were removed on Sky. Local TV Cardiff was on channel 135 due to S4C previously occupying channel 117. Local TV Cardiff was renamed Local TV and moved to channel 195, the lowest ranked slot in the EPG's entertainment section and began broadcasting to all of the United Kingdom. All six Local TV services (not Manchester or North Wales) were merged into this new channel with various local news broadcasts over a 2 hour period instead of just one news broadcast.

== Organisation ==
Local TV Limited's headquarters are at the Leeds Media Centre in the Chapeltown area of Leeds, with studios and offices based at Elgin House in Cardiff city centre, the Toxteth TV studios in the Toxteth suburb of Liverpool and the David Puttnam Media Centre at the University of Sunderland. Playout and presentation for the network is run from the Leeds headquarters.

On 19 August 2018, Made Television rebranded as Local TV Limited and all sub-channels were renamed according to their city.

By 2021, Local TV's chairman David Montgomery (a newspaper executive, whose company National World was known for taking over JPIMedia in a £10m deal which included papers such as The Scotsman and The Yorkshire Post) outlined plans for a new 'Northern TV Network' which would include Local TV's channels in Leeds, Liverpool, Manchester and Newcastle. The 'NTVN' plans were later quietly dropped.

In 2022, Ofcom agreed to Local TV Limited's proposal to close their production centres in Birmingham, Bristol and on Teesside, as the company decided to keep their remote Covid working practices as the company standard.
