= Timeline of That's TV =

This is a timeline of That's TV, which provides local and national channels in the United Kingdom.

== 2010s ==
- 2012
  - 10 May – Ofcom invites bids for local TV services in 34 areas of the UK.
  - August – 57 applications were received to provide these services.
  - September – That's TV is awarded a licence to broadcast the local TV service for Oxfordshire. Two months later, the company win a second licence for the Southampton and Portsmouth areas, in conjunction with newspaper publishers Newsquest and Johnston Press.
- 2013
  - 26 November – The first Local Digital Television Programme Services launches when Estuary TV begins broadcasting.
- 2014
  - 26 November – That's Solent begins broadcasting.
- 2015
  - March – That's TV takes a controlling stake in YourTV. YourTV had been awarded the local TV licences for the Manchester and Preston/Blackpool areas, but both services failed to launch within the two-year timeframe permitted by Ofcom.
  - 17 April – That's Oxfordshire begins broadcasting.
  - 31 May – That's Manchester begins broadcasting.
  - 24 August – That's Lancashire begins broadcasting to the Preston and Blackpool areas.
- 2016
  - Following the closure of BBC Three, the local stations move from Channel 8 to channel 7 in England and Northern Ireland, and from channel 23 to channel 8 in Scotland and Wales.
  - 12 July – That's Swansea Bay begins broadcasting.
  - October – That's TV buys the licence for the York local TV service, formerly held by 'Hello York'. The group also buys out Cambridge TV and launches That's Cambridge on 28 November.
- 2017
  - May – That's Thames Valley begins broadcasting to the Reading area of Berkshire.
  - 23 May – That's Hampshire begins broadcasting.
  - 26 June – That's York begins broadcasting.
  - 19 July – That's Salisbury begins broadcasting.
  - 25 July – That's Carlisle begins broadcasting.
  - 1 August – That's North Yorkshire begins broadcasting to the Scarborough area.
  - 2 August – That's Surrey begins broadcasting.
  - August – That's TV buys Norfolk station Mustard TV.
  - 29 November – That's Norfolk begins broadcasting.
- 2018
  - 30 May – That's Lincolnshire launches.
  - 30 June – That's TV acquires the assets of STV's STV2 channel.
  - 15 October – That's TV Scotland launches as the replacement local television service in Aberdeen, Ayr, Dundee, Edinburgh and Glasgow.
- 2019
  - July – That's TV announces the closure of 13 of its 20 studios in order to downsize to seven regional production centres producing content for its 20 local stations.

== 2020s ==
- 2020
  - 12 November – Local news is reduced to a 10-minute slot at 6pm when That's TV is temporarily rebranded as That's Christmas and mixes up its music programming - which earlier in 2020 had become to main focus of output - so that Christmas hits would be played alongside 'party classics' from the 70s, 80s or 90s.
- 2021
  - 4 June – That's TV launches a national channel called That's TV Gold. and on 9 July it launches on Freeview, simulcasting its schedule with its 20 regional versions of That's TV. The channel largely keeps the pop-video hits format of its local service but drops the evening local news and the TJC simulcast in the mornings, adding documentaries and concerts largely drawn from the IMC Vision catalogue. That's TV starts to acquire a number of documentaries and classic comedy series, in order that the national service was not a retro pop video network once the local news was taken out of the schedule.
  - 1 November – Ofcom agrees to That's TV's request to reduce the number of production bases it has in regards to its newsgathering with some local news items to be produced outside the broadcast areas the company holds the licence for. That's TV hopes to have most of its news bulletins produced in studios based in Salford (for England) or Glasgow (for Scotland), with additional offices operating in Reading, Norwich, and Swansea (with news programmes for Wales to be either produced in Salford or Glasgow in the future).
  - 18 November – That's TV Gold is rebranded for the festival period as That's TV Christmas. It shows comedy programmes made by Thames TV/Fremantle which includes repeats of The Benny Hill Show as well as programmes featuring Kenny Everett, Mike Yarwood, and Tommy Cooper, while the Carry On... team were seen in a number of Christmas TV specials. It also shows LWT's hidden camera show Beadle's About.
- 2022
  - 4 January – That's TV drops the word Gold from its national channel branding when it changes back from its Christmas schedule.
  - 13 April – That's Music launches with the intention that when both this and the main That's TV network are broadcasting music, a different decade would be showcased on each, and with music continuing on the new channel when That's Entertainment.
  - 30 June –
    - That's TV's national channel receives increased coverage on Freeview when it moves into FreeSports' slot on channel 65 when that channel stopped broadcasting on Freeview.
    - That's Music is renamed as Classic Hits and its Freeview broadcast arrangements were changed, with its channel number moving up one place to channel 91. The channel moves to a more widely-available Freeview DVB-T broadcast multiplex, but only on Freeview only at night.
  - 2 August – The 24 hour version of Classic Hits launches on satellite and in December it launches on Freesat.
  - 24 August – That's TV increases its national operating hours on Freeview by reducing its timeshare channel Classic Hits' music video schedule to 4am–7am. This gave That's TV an extra hour of entertainment programming each night between 3am and 4am on Freeview which is not covered by local television scheduling commitments (as they usually run local news on channel 7/8 between 3am and 6am). In addition to these changes, the company took over Country Music Entertainment's Freeview licence in Greater Manchester for their music video channel.
- 2023
  - 6 January – Classic Hits is split into multiple decade-themed channels, branded as That's 60s, That's 70s, That's 80s and That's 90s. A 20-hour broadcast of That's 60s is made available on Freeview nationally in space freed up by the closure of the Smithsonian Channel.
  - 23 March – That's 70s launches as a full-time channel, broadcasting nationally on Freeview between 3am and 9am and in Manchester as a full-time service.
  - 10 July – That's TV and That's 60s launch on Virgin Media.
  - 30 August – That's 90s launches on Sky. and three days later it launches on Freeview in Manchester.
- 2024
  - 3 January – That's TV 2 launches, replacing That's 70s.
  - 23 February - Chart Show Retro begins broadcasting via satellite ahead of its official launch on March 4.
  - 12 June - That's 90s is replaced with That's Dance and That's Memories launches on Freeview.
  - 24 June - Chart Show Retro closes after just four months on air, as the channel had been seen as a "pilot" on the Sky platform. It is replaced on satellite by That's Dance.
  - 1 July - That's Memories launches on satellite, replacing That's 60s.
  - 19 August - That’s Rock and That’s Melody replace That’s 80s and That’s 90s.
  - 21 August - That’s TV 3 replaces That’s Memories.
  - 18 September - That’s Fabulous replaces That’s Rock.
- 2025
  - 13 January - That's Oldies replaces That's Fabulous.
  - 23 April - That's TV takes over the local television licences held by Sheffield Live! in South Yorkshire and Northern Visions Television in Belfast.
  - 21 May - That's Pride and That's Summer replaces That's Oldies and That's Dance.
  - 2 June - That's Pride rebrands back to That's Dance.
  - 20 August - That's Rock and That's Oldies replace That's Dance and That's Summer.
  - 19 November - That's 80s returns, replacing That's Rock.
- 2026
  - 18 February - That's TV launches four free FAST music channels music channels on Pluto TV and Rakuten TV.
  - 28 February - That's Melody, That's Oldies and That's 80s stops broadcasting.
  - 22 April - That's 20th Century replaces That's TV 3.
  - 26 May - That's TV 2 and That's 20th Century stop broadcasting on Sky and Virgin Media.
  - 11 July - That's TV stops broadcasting on Virgin Media.
  - 30 July - That's TV stops broadcasting on Sky.
  - 19 August - That's 20th Century is replaced by Your TV on Freeview.

== See also ==
- Timeline of local television in the UK
