= That's TV =

Network of local television services in the United Kingdom

- Country: United Kingdom
- Broadcast area: United Kingdom
- Network: That's Television Ltd
- Headquarters: The Flint Glass Works, 64 Jersey Street, Manchester

Programming
- Language: English
- Picture format: 576i SDTV

Ownership
- Owner: That's Media Ltd

History
- Launched: 26 November 2014

Links
- Website: www.thats.tv (closed)

Availability

Terrestrial
- Freeview: Channel 7, (Note: The local versions with local news are shown on channel 7 in these areas: Belfast, East Anglia, Hampshire, Humber, Lancashire, Manchester, North Yorkshire, Salisbury & Wessex, South Midlands & Cotswolds, South Yorkshire, Surrey & South East, Thames Valley, West Anglia.) 8, (Note: The local versions with local news are shown on channel 8 in these areas: Central Scotland, Cumbria & Border, East Scotland, Edinburgh & South Scotland, North Scotland, Swansea Bay & South Wales, West Scotland, York.) 56 (Note: The national version without local news is shown on channel 56 throughout the UK except Greater Manchester) This channel is available from 06:00-04:00) or 79 (Note: The national version without local news is shown on channel 80 in Greater Manchester only and is available 24 hours.)

That's TV is a network of local and national British free-to-air television channels in the United Kingdom, broadcasting via Freeview, carrying only a small number of both local and national regions.

That's TV started off as the owner of a number of local television licences in several conurbations, but even though some local news can still be found via these services, these channels simulcast the schedule of the national That's TV channel for most of the day, but with some variations.

That's Television Ltd is owned by That's Media Ltd, which is based at The Flint Glass Works in the Ancoats neighbourhood of Manchester.

== History ==
In September 2012, the broadcast regulator Ofcom announced That's TV had been awarded a licence to broadcast local TV service for Oxfordshire. Two months later, the company won a second licence for the Southampton and Portsmouth areas, in conjunction with newspaper publishers Newsquest and Johnston Press. That's Solent began broadcasting on 26 November 2014 while a soft launch of That's Oxford took place on 17 April 2015.

Prior to the launch of the Solent station, That's TV gained a further three licences in the south of England in June 2014 for the Guildford, Reading and Salisbury areas, followed a month later by a Basingstoke licence. In June 2015, a ninth licence was gained to serve the Carlisle area, in partnership with the CN Group.

The local TV licences for the Manchester and Preston/Blackpool areas were initially awarded to YourTV in February 2013, but both services failed to launch within the two-year timeframe permitted by the regulator. That's TV took a controlling stake in YourTV in March 2015 A soft launch of That's Manchester took place on 31 May 2015, followed by That's Lancashire on 24 August. By February 2020 it was airing half an hour of local news per day.

The founder of That's TV, Esther Rantzen, became the group's vice president when it opened its first station in Portsmouth and was lined up to present a weekly magazine programme. In May 2015, Rantzen resigned from the company along with former Meridian Broadcasting executive Mary McAnally.

In March 2016, Ofcom placed three of the stations – Manchester, Oxford and Solent – on notice over persistent technical issues.

In October 2016, it was announced That's TV had bought the licence for the York local TV service, formerly held by 'Hello York'. The group also bought out Cambridge TV.

On 2 January 2017, five That's TV stations (Cambridge, Lancashire, Manchester, Oxfordshire, Solent) started to simulcast Talking Pictures TV for six hours each day. In August 2017, That's TV bought Norfolk station Mustard TV.

In May 2018, That's TV agreed to acquire the assets of STV's STV2 channel launching on the 15th of October. In August 2018, That's TV bought Estuary TV's channel slots, covering North and North East Lincolnshire and the rest of the Lincolnshire area.

In July 2019, That's TV announced the closure of 13 of its 20 studios in order to downsize to seven regional production centres producing content for its 20 local stations. The remaining centres were announced as being located in Edinburgh, Glasgow, Manchester, York, Cambridge, Salisbury and Swansea.

In February 2021, That's TV started to broadcast nationally to viewers with a compatible internet connected HD television set, as it joined TV stations such as Spotlight TV and Yanga! on VisionTV's streaming service (found on Freeview channel 264).

That's TV's national channel launched as That's TV Gold. It began test broadcasts on 4 June 2021 on satellite frequency 11582 H DVB-S QPSK 22 5/6 under the label 52139. That's TV Gold will be on Sky channel 187. In order to be listed in the entertainment section (below channel 200) and not with the music channels (channels 350 to 399), That's TV started to acquire a number of documentaries and classic comedy series, in order that the national service was not a retro pop video network once the local news was taken out of the schedule.

On 9 July, That's TV Gold launched on Freeview channel 91, simulcasting its schedule with its 20 regional versions of That's TV on Freeview. The channel largely keeps the pop-video hits format of its local service but drops the evening local news and the TJC simulcast in the mornings, adding documentaries and concerts largely drawn from the IMC Vision catalogue.

On 11 October 2021, That's TV Gold launched on Freesat, broadcasting 24 hours per day on channel 178.

On 4 January 2022, That's TV dropped the word Gold from its national channel branding when it changed back from its Christmas schedule, even though it was still licensed under the name of That's TV Gold at Ofcom. On 30 June 2022, the national That's TV channel received increased coverage on Freeview after it moved into FreeSports' slot on channel 65 when that channel stopped broadcasting on Freeview.

On 24 August 2022, That's TV increased its national operating hours on Freeview channel 65 by reducing its timeshare channel Classic Hits' music video schedule to 4am–7am. This gave That's TV an extra hour of entertainment programming each night between 3am and 4am on Freeview which is not covered by local television scheduling commitments (as they usually run local news on channel 7/8 between 3am and 6am). In addition to these changes, the company took over Country Music Entertainment's Freeview licence in Greater Manchester for their music video channel.

In July 2022, That's TV requested licences from Ofcom for services called That's Reality and That's Comedy. In November 2022, they were granted licences for channels called That's 60s and That's 70s, ahead of the launch of an expanded suite of music video channels from the firm, with That's TV going on to acquire provisional licences for channels made up of 2000s and 2010s music videos as well. In July 2023, it was reported that the licence for the forthcoming That's Reality channel had been changed to That's Cinema, whilst That's Comedy had not launched and the main service had been taken off the Vision TV app.

In December 2023, That's TV announced that they had acquired the Chart Show brand from the Trace Group in addition to its remaining Sky EPG slot which had been vacated by Trace Vault. The company used the slot to launch a new music channel under the Chart Show brand, named Chart Show Retro, which launched on Sky on 4 March 2024.

In 2024, it was reported that the parent company, That's Media, was planning to launch a new streaming app with the company also launching That's Memories and That's Dance on 12 June 2024. Whereas That's Dance is a rebranded channel, That's Memories uses the old The Community Channel slot, as That's Media bought the TCC Broadcasting licence from A&E Networks (who had been using the slot overnight to show programmes from Blaze after that channel had gone off air every night at 2am). In addition to these channels getting national slots on Freeview, they added simulcast channels in Greater Manchester of these services using the bandwidth they acquired when That's Media bought MTN (the Manchester Television Network) in 2023.

On 21 August 2024, That's TV launched That's Melody, That's Rock and That's TV3 in the place of That's 80s, That's 90s and That's Memories.

In April 2025, That's TV took over the local television licences of Sheffield Live! in South Yorkshire and Northern Visions Television in Belfast, with the former continuing to run its community radio station and the latter having provisions in the takeover for its programmes to be shown by That's TV Belfast.

On 8 December 2025, That’s TV UK and That’s TV2 went off air on Freeview and began displaying a message: "This service is currently not available". However, the channel was still broadcasting normally on other TV platforms such as Freesat and Virgin Media. According to RXTV, "the broadcaster had not responded to enquiries about the loss of service..... Both That’s TV UK and That’s TV2 are carried by one multiplex operator. The unaffected channels – That’s TV3, That’s Christmas and That’s TV local – are carried by different operators. The nature of the current outage indicates a technical, legal or contractual problem between That’s TV and a multiplex operator." That’s TV UK and That’s TV2 both came back on air on Freeview on 12 December.

On 25 June 2026, the That's TV channel was removed from Freesat. It was removed from Virgin Media on 11 July 2026, and was removed from Sky on 30 July 2026. However, both the Freeview national and local channels remained.

== Programming ==
On 12 November 2020, That's TV became That's Christmas and began broadcasting Take the High Road after it announced an agreement with STV to show all 1,516 episodes.

In 2021, That's TV started to show music from the 1960s 'non-stop' each weekend, starting on Valentine's Day weekend with 48 hours of 60s music played back-to-back without adverts.

In October 2021, That's TV started to show Thames TV's early 1990s compilations of The Best of Tommy Cooper, which were previously shown on UKTV's Yesterday channel and the BAFTA-winning The Kenny Everett Video Show, a programme from 1978 which mixed music performances by people like Bryan Ferry with dance routines and comedy sketches. Both programmes were licensed from Thames TV rights holder Fremantle. On 19 October 2021, the channel started to show series 2 of Men Behaving Badly featuring the 'classic' line-up of Martin Clunes, Neil Morrissey, Caroline Quentin, and Leslie Ash. They did not schedule any of the episodes from series 1, featuring Harry Enfield as Dermot Povey, before that date or show any of the episodes made for the BBC.

On 18 November 2021, That's TV Gold rebranded for the festival period as That's TV Christmas and launched its Xmas schedule with repeats of The Benny Hill Show. The channel will be showing a number of Benny Hill specials made for Thames TV between 1969 and 1989 simultaneously on Freeview channel 91 and its network of local channels, with Hill's programmes showing in full for the first time on a national TV channel in 20 years.

Other comedians to be found on the channel over the festive period included Kenny Everett, Mike Yarwood, and Tommy Cooper, while the Carry On... team were seen in a number of Christmas TV specials. As well as programmes from Thames TV/Fremantle, That's TV also licensed the rights to LWT hidden camera show Beadle's About. This practical joke show was originally broadcast by ITV between November 1986 and September 1996, and like The Benny Hill Show, is another show which has not been repeated on British TV in a couple of decades.

In 2022, That's TV licensed the rights to classic 1980s children's TV series Press Gang, written by Steven Moffatt and starring Julia Sawalha, Lucy Benjamin, and Dexter Fletcher in early roles. Other rights picked up for rebroadcast by the channel in the first few months of 2022 included Sez Les with John Cleese, a Yorkshire Television sketch comedy show that starred Les Dawson alongside Monty Python member Cleese and Coronation Street's Roy Barraclough, Hylda Baker's sitcom Not On Your Nellie, Russ Abbott's Madhouse and Autopsy, a programme with Dr. Michael Hunter from the Reelz Channel in America, turning up on the That's TV EPG under episode titles such as Larry Hagman: What Killed JR?, Luther Vandross: Killed by Food?, Bee Gee Andy: Inner Demons or Adam West: What Killed Batman?.

After broadcasting a number of episodes of the Les Dawson variety comedy show Sez Les, That's TV acquired broadcast rights of Monty Python's Flying Circus alongside repeats of The Kumars at No. 42, Whose Line Is It Anyway? and Harry Enfield's Television Programme. By the end of March 2022, their weeknight comedy schedule included Monty Python every night alongside Hale and Pace and The Mrs Merton Show

On 4 September 2022, Till Death Us Do Part started airing on That's TV as part of a nightly BBC sitcom double bill with The Fall and Rise of Reginald Perrin, with four 'lost episodes' ("Intolerance", "In Sickness and In Health", "State Visit" and "The Phone") included as part of the run by the channel. On 8 September 2022, the run was temporarily interrupted as the channel and Classic Hits were taken off air for 24 hours as a mark of respect for Queen Elizabeth II.

In June 2023, That's TV decided to re-run the full series of the BBC's 1970s sitcom It Ain't Half Hot Mum with all episodes being shown in full without edits to remove potentially offensive language.

For the 2023 holiday season, That's TV decided against using their local TV service for the Christmas channel, instead using channel 65 on Freeview (which was That's 60s national slot) for That's Christmas, with That's 80s MCR becoming Best Xmas Music on 22 November 2023, for viewers in the Greater Manchester region.

In 2024, Home and Away, a long-standing Australian soap opera, began to air on That's TV 2. Freeview channel 65, Sky channel 188, and Freesat channel 181 broadcast the show. It was the first time the soap opera aired on terrestrial TV since its original release, but the transmissions stopped after 18 episodes had been broadcast.

== Local television services ==
As of October 2018, the company operates services in 18 areas, all licensed by Ofcom under the Local Digital Television Programme.

Station	Studio-based	Coverage area	Transmitter
That's Belfast (was Northern Visions Television)	Belfast	Northern Ireland	Divis
That's Cambridge	Cambridge	Cambridgeshire	Sandy Heath
That's Cumbria (was That's Carlisle)	Carlisle	Cumbria	Caldbeck
That's Glasgow (was STV2)	Glasgow	Glasgow	Black Hill
That's Hampshire	Basingstoke	North Hampshire	Hannington
That's Lancashire	Preston	Lancashire	Winter Hill
That's Lothian (was STV2)	Edinburgh	Edinburgh	Craigkelly
That's Humber	Hull	East Yorkshire and Northern Lincolnshire	Belmont
That's Manchester	Manchester	Greater Manchester	Winter Hill
That's Norfolk (was Mustard TV)	Norwich	Norfolk	Tacolneston
That's North Yorkshire	Scarborough	Yorkshire Coast	Oliver's Mount
That's Oxfordshire	Abingdon	Oxfordshire	Oxford
That's Salisbury	Salisbury	Salisbury and Amesbury area	Salisbury
That's Sheffield (was Sheffield Live!)	Sheffield	South Yorkshire	Tapton Hill
That's Solent	Portsmouth	Southampton, Winchester and the Isle of Wight	Rowridge
That's Surrey	Guildford	Guildford and parts of south west Surrey	Guildford
That's Swansea Bay (was Bay TV Swansea)	Swansea	South West Wales	Kilvey Hill
That's Thames Valley	Reading	Reading and parts of Berkshire	Hannington
That's York	York	York and North Yorkshire	Emley Moor

== Criticism ==
=== BBC subsidies ===
When launching his local TV initiative in 2011, Jeremy Hunt, then Culture Secretary, said, "Eight out of 10 consider local news important. Nearly seven out of 10 adults feel the localness of stories is more important than them being professionally produced. People in Barnham don't want to watch what is going on in Southampton. People in Chelmsford aren't interested in what's happening in Watford. That is the system we currently have at the moment, so that is what we are trying to rethink."

In June 2018, BuzzFeed revealed how That's TV had "gamed" the BBC's subsidy system to claim hundreds of thousands of pounds of licence fee payers' money, by submitting low-quality local news footage to the BBC, which under the system would pay £147.50 per segment, whether or not they were aired. The report also claimed that several of the company's stations had fewer than 30 viewers per day. Dale McEwan, a former journalist for That's Solent, reported that the station sent 1,207 stories to the BBC in year one (November 2014 to November 2015) but the BBC used only 114 (9.4% of stories), equating to a cost of £1,315 per story. The National Union of Journalists in Scotland said it was "deeply concerned" by McEwan's revelations and news that That's TV was launching five stations in Scotland.

McEwan wrote an investigative article for Private Eye magazine in March 2019 where he revealed that That's TV was refusing to tell the public where stations were broadcasting from. The report explained that That's TV deleted the addresses for its stations across the UK and replaced them with one contact address in a Lancashire business park. Ofcom also said it could not give any details of where stations broadcast from. A longer version of the article was published by the Star and Crescent, where McEwan revealed that the first station to launch – That's Solent in 2014 – had left Highbury College in Portsmouth. The station's whereabouts remained unknown.

In May 2019, McEwan's investigations found that That's TV wanted to abandon the local communities it is publicly funded to serve. He found that That's TV had submitted plans to Ofcom to run the entire network of 20 local stations from seven studios/main production offices, which Ofcom had provisionally allowed.

=== Mistreatment of staff ===
In June 2018, unpaid interns working for That's TV were reported to have "passed out through exhaustion".

In July 2018, former That's Solent journalist Dale McEwan reported his own experiences of working for the organisation. He listed bullying, exploitation, poor pay, and exhausting hours among his concerns. In October 2018, McEwan continued his investigations into That's TV. Former That's TV staff members said the BBC was breaking its internal ethics code through its contract with the company. That's TV must adhere to the code as a supplier of video stories to the BBC. As the code states, suppliers "must pay wages sufficient to meet basic needs and to provide some discretionary income". But That's TV's decision to pay staff the National Minimum Wage on zero-hour contracts and expect them to cover their own large petrol costs means that staff were effectively earning poverty wages.

=== Office and studio locations ===
McEwan found evidence suggesting that That's Hampshire staff were sharing the office of That's Thames Valley in Reading. Ofcom said it is a licence condition for all local TV licensees to ensure that the main production base of the licensed service, and/or studio from which the licensed service is broadcast, is located within the licensed area. The regulator confirmed a station's office can be based outside of the licensed area, but prior written consent must be given. Ofcom said consent had not been given to That's TV. Ofcom added that it was investigating and would take action if it found a breach of licence had taken place.

Ofcom also revealed that it was not taking any action against That's TV for apparent licence breaches. But evidence had previously been found that That's TV had already started operating stations from outside of the local communities. This evidence was found before That's TV submitted its plans for studio/office sharing across the network (for example, That's Hampshire explained above). McEwan also pushed Ofcom for details about where stations were located. Ofcom gave limited details in a Freedom of Information response published in the same article. Six of That's TV's 20 stations already did not have a studio or office in the licensed area. Five licences had an office in the licensed area but used a studio outside of the area to record programmes. That's Solent was one of nine licences that Ofcom believed had a studio in the licensed area. However, in what appeared to be a blunder, a YouTube video showed a That's Solent presenter reading out the station contact details for That's Salisbury during a pre-recorded bulletin on 5 February 2019. The presenter then gave the contact details for That's Solent.

Ofcom's letter of approval to That's TV said journalists would still be based in the local licensed areas but without physical premises. Ofcom explained That's TV's "commitment for journalists and reporters to continue to collect, develop and record interviews on location within the licensed area..." Ofcom believed this meant that the "local presence" of stations like That's Solent would be "maintained". The regulator also stated, "That's TV has confirmed that viewers of the services will not notice any difference in the content broadcast, with news items and interviews still recorded within the licensed area..." But sites like Star & Crescent previously watched That's Solent news bulletins that aired many stories from outside of the Solent area. For example, the top story in one news bulletin was about Salisbury, with the show also featuring stories from Basingstoke, Newbury, and Birmingham. A former employee of another That's TV station said Ofcom's claim that viewers would not notice any difference in news content "completely misses the point". They said, "Out of a total of usually six to ten stories (completely depending on video times), three or four are filmed within the station location and the remaining are filmed out with, usually a completely different city. The news programmes [at this station] have always contained news stories from out within the licensed area. This is the same for all over the UK."

In July 2019, McEwan continued his investigations after Ofcom officially announced permission for That's TV to close 13 studios in its network of 20 local TV stations across the UK. That's TV was allowed to operate from seven regional studios, as predicted by McEwan in his previous report. For example, That's Solent was now included within a "South of England" hub and would be broadcast from That's Salisbury's studio in Salisbury along with the stations for Basingstoke, Guildford, Oxford, and Reading. All news shows from these stations were to be hosted by presenters in Salisbury. But McEwan's previous investigation revealed signs that That's Solent had already departed from the Solent area and started broadcasting from Salisbury months before Ofcom gave consent for the move. A former That's Solent journalist, who wished to remain anonymous, described the decision as a "joke". A source close to That's TV employees also claimed staff read about nationwide studio closures on news sites rather than being told by management.

In December 2019, the Star & Crescent published the following update to its story about the closure of 13 studios in That's TV's network of 20 licences: That's TV chief executive Daniel Cass had previously told BBC News in July 2019: "Does it make sense to be investing resources in 20 physical premises where you're tying up quite a lot of your reporters and journalists in administration and technical work rather than doing what we're doing going forward, which is freeing them up to spend significant time to be journalists?" This comment referred to That's TV's premises across the UK and implied that the company had, or at least wanted to have, premises for each of its 20 licences. The comment implied that the company, "going forward", wanted to do something different compared to what it had been doing. In the interest of accuracy, Star & Crescent found evidence that this is a misleading comment from Cass. Former That's TV Scotland freelancers said there was a lack of premises in Scotland, meaning there were not "20 physical premises" for each of the 20 licences. Freelancers said there was only one studio in Scotland, which served all of the five Scottish licences. Freelancers also had to work from home or use WiFi in Costas and Starbucks, or Regus business lounges, in their local areas. This was because, out of the five Scottish licences, Glasgow was the only locality that had a permanent production office. Prior to Cass' comment to BBC News in July 2019, Ofcom had also confirmed in a freedom of information reply in April 2019 that it had no address details for either production offices or studios in the licensed areas of Aberdeen, Ayr, Dundee and Edinburgh. This also means that That's TV did not have 20 studios in its network, so the BBC News article was incorrect.

In 2021, Ofcom agreed to the request from That's TV to reduce the number of production bases it has in regards to its newsgathering with some local news items to be produced outside the broadcast areas the company holds the licence for. That's TV hopes to have most of its news bulletins produced in studios based in Salford (for England) or Glasgow (for Scotland), with additional offices operating in Reading, Norwich, and Swansea (with news programmes for Wales to be either produced in Salford or Glasgow in the future).

=== Colleges ===
McEwan wrote another investigative article in October 2018. He found that at least four colleges and universities had asked the local That's TV stations to leave the premises. For example, Queen Mary's College (QMC) in Basingstoke served notice on That's Hampshire in summer 2018 after the BuzzFeed investigation. That's TV did not, however, inform broadcast regulator Ofcom about the station's change of address; the QMC address was still displayed on Ofcom's website months after the station left QMC.

A Freedom of Information reply from Highbury College disclosed that That's Solent left the college in November 2018 by "mutual consent", but did not elaborate further. The letter also showed that That's TV rented premises at Highbury for free during its entire four-year contract. This was despite the broadcaster standing to earn millions of pounds of BBC licence fee funding. That's TV had agreed to offer training opportunities to Highbury students in return for the studio and office space, but former That's Solent employees previously said That's TV was not benefiting Highbury students' education.

== Current entertainment channels ==
=== That’s TV (UK) ===
This is the national version of That's TV, and carries the same programming as available locally through Freeview, though interstitial programming takes the place of local insertion of news bulletins. It was formerly known as That's TV Gold. The national version of That's TV is also available on other providers along with That's TV 2 and That's TV 3.

That's TV closed on Virgin Media on 11 July 2026 with "Programmes no longer available" showing on their TV guide.

It closed on Sky on 30 July 2026.

=== That’s TV 2 ===
That's TV 2 replaced 70s music channel That's 70s on 3 January 2024, after carrying holiday programming as That's Christmas.

That's TV 2 closed on Sky and Virgin Media 25 May 2026 but is still being broadcast on Freeview.

=== Your TV ===
That's TV 3 replaced That's Memories on 21 August 2024 (itself short-lived, only airing from 12 June), changing its focus from historical documentaries to a schedule like the main That's TV national channel and That's TV 2, but with a That's 60s block in the morning. From 17 October 2024 until 7 January 2025, it carried holiday content under the temporary That's Christmas branding.

In June 2025, the channel became the first the first channel on Freeview to be broadcast on a DVB-T(1) multiplex using the MPEG-4 AVC video codec, together with sound using the HE-AAC audio codec, making older DVB-T(1) TVs unable able to decode the channel.

On 22 April 2026, the channel was rebranded as That's 20th Century.

That's 20th Century closed on Sky and Virgin Media on 25 May 2026 but was still being broadcast on Freeview until 19 August when it was replaced by Your TV.

== Music channels ==
In spring 2022, That's TV acquired additional space on the limited-reach COM7 Freeview DVB-T2 multiplex and elected to launch a 24-hour music channel called That's Music. The channel launched on Freeview channel 92 on 13 April 2022, with the intention that when both this and the main That's TV network are broadcasting music, a different decade would be showcased on each, and with music continuing on the new channel when That's Entertainment (the section usually made up of documentaries and old sitcoms) was being broadcast in the schedules.

On 30 June 2022, with the COM7 multiplex closing, the music channel's name was changed to Classic Hits and its Freeview broadcast arrangements were changed, with its channel number moving up one place to channel 91. The channel moved to a more widely-available Freeview DVB-T broadcast multiplex, but would now broadcast on Freeview only at night.

The 24 hour version of Classic Hits subsequently reappeared on satellite, and launched on Sky channel 366 on 2 August 2022.

On 24 August 2022, That's TV further reduced the hours of Classic Hits on Freeview to three hours a night, so they could run their main entertainment channel until 4am. In tandem with reducing the hours of Classic Hits nationally, That's TV entered into a deal where they would take on the Freeview licence of channel operator Entertainment Television Channels, who had a 24-hour slot on the Greater Manchester multiplex for their Country Music Entertainment (CME) brand. This music channel was broadcast on linear Freeview to viewers in Manchester, but also could be accessed nationally via streaming operator On Demand 365 on Freeview channel 265 and as an online radio station. As a result of their deal with That's TV, from 24 August 2022, the 24-hour version of Classic Hits joined the channels available in the Manchester area, labelled Classic Hits MCR and listed on channel 91 (where the national late-night Classic Hits had been situated), with the part-time national Classic Hits channel moving up to the old CME slot on Freeview 88. CME ceased to broadcast as a linear channel as a result, but could be still accessed nationwide as a streaming channel via On Demand 365.

The satellite broadcast of Classic Hits was made fully available on the Freesat platform in December 2022.

On 6 January 2023, Classic Hits was split into multiple decade-themed channels, branded as That's 60s, That's 70s, That's 80s and That's 90s, with the aim of competing with established services such as MTV 80s, MTV 90s, Now 70s and Now 80s. A 20-hour broadcast of That's 60s was made available on Freeview nationally in space freed up by the closure that day of the Smithsonian Channel. A 'video playlist' presented by Tony Blackburn was the first programme shown on That's 60s with "Flowers in the Rain" by The Move being the first performance, played a reference to Tony Blackburn being the first presenter on BBC Radio 1 in 1967. As the music video era did not really start for another decade, That's 60s uses mostly live band clips and performances taken from worldwide pop TV shows made in that era. In addition That's 60s have plans to have programmes presented by David Hamilton and Bob Harris in the future. In addition to launching on Freeview, That's 60s was launched onto Sky and Freesat, directly replacing Classic Hits on satellite.

The existing Classic Hits channels on Freeview - full-time in Manchester and part-time nationally - were replaced by That's 80s. A few days later, a broadcast of That's 80s began transmitting on the Astra satellite; this was added to the Sky satellite EPG on 16 January. Unlike its 60s sibling, That's 80s was not added to the Freesat EPG but the free-to-air broadcast can be manually tuned-in on Freesat equipment as with other free channels.

In addition to That's 60s and That's 80s nationally, slots for four channels - the 60s and 80s services running full-day, plus slots allocated for That's 70s and That's 90s - were placed onto Freeview in the Greater Manchester area, utilising the local multiplex originally established for the defunct Channel M service. The 60s and 80s channels are labelled with 'MCR' after their names to differentiate these from the nationwide feeds. That's 70s and 90s were not fully launched with programming at the time of their addition to the programme guide, instead running placeholders with a "Coming Soon" message.

In mid-March 2023, a video test feed for That's 70s began transmitting on the Astra satellite. It went live as a 24-hour channel on 23 March with national Freeview transmissions starting at 3am on 24 March 2023, broadcasting part-time in capacity shared with That's 60s. As That's 70s is only a part time channel nationally operating between 3am and 9am, a full-time That's 70s MCR operating full time on Freeview in the Greater Manchester area took the place previously allocated to the That's 90s placeholder on the same multiplex.

The satellite broadcast of a 'That's 90s' feed began in August 2023, utilising capacity freed up by the earlier closure of Trace Hits. This was added to the Sky electronic programme guide on Wednesday 30 August. A placeholder for That's 90s was added to Freeview in the Manchester area on 23 August as part of a wider reshuffle of services on the Freeview guide, which also led to the broadcast hours and channel numbers of some other That's TV channels changing. The channel began broadcasting on Freeview on 2 September, with its first day's schedule including Dave Pearce Dance Anthems as well as music blocks with names like More Music - Less Chat! and We Play More Music Than NOW 80s!, a latter being a reference to a revival channel broadcasting on Freeview 271 via Channelbox.

From 18 October 2023, That's 70s was temporarily suspended to enable the broadcast of seasonal film and music channel That's Christmas, which in previous years had temporarily replaced That's TV UK. On Freeview, That's 60s temporarily moved to the positions previously used by That's 70s, such that the Christmas channel could take the 18-hour UK-wide slot on channel 65; on Sky, That's 70s was moved to the Entertainment guide and relabelled, with That's 80s and 90s moved up to fill the gap in the Music section. On Freesat, That's 60s was removed from the Music guide, remaining available by manual tuning, with That's Christmas added to the rear of the Entertainment listing. That's Christmas was not added on Virgin Media, where That's TV UK and That's 60s continue unchanged. At the same time That's 90s replaced That's 80s on UK-wide Freeview, with both remaining available as discrete channels in Manchester; viewers outside the city can continue to see 70s and 90s music via the daily programmed blocs on That's TV UK. That's 80s subsequently flipped temporarily to continuous Christmas music in the Music section of the programme guide, under the name "Best Xmas Music" (also the title used for Christmas music blocks on the That's TV and That's Christmas channels). In December 2023 it was confirmed that, from 3 January 2024, following the Christmas period 'freeze' on EPG changes, "Best Xmas Music" would revert to That's 80s, and move to channel 360 (the former home of the closed Trace Vault), with That's 90s moving to the '80s channel's former position, and that That's 70s would not be reinstated, instead retained in the Entertainment programme guide as a second That's TV channel (That's TV 2).

On 25 February 2026, That's TV announced that their three linear music channels (That's Melody, That's Oldies and That's 80s) will close down on 28 February 2026 via text on the top of the screen saying 'THIS SERVICE CLOSES 28 FEBRUARY, THE MUSIC CONTINUES ON THAT'S TV CHANNELS'.

== FAST music channels ==
On 18 February 2026, That's TV launched four free streamed channels on Pluto TV and Rakuten TV in the UK. These replaced the FAST broadcasts of Mercury Studios channels Now 70s, Now 80s, Now 90s & 00s and Now Rock on those platforms with That's-run channels under the same themes - That's 70s (reinstated as a full-time channel for the first time since the closure of the previous linear That's 70s in favour of That's TV 2), That's 80s (a separate feed from the broadcast TV version of the same concept), That's 90s00s and That's Rock (which had ceased as a full-time linear channel three months prior, in favour of reinstating That's 80s in its place.) The channel identity labels on Pluto and Rakuten changed to the That's versions a few days ahead of schedule, and when selected prior to the feed changeover on 18 February continued to play the Now channels previously associated with the slots. Mercury's Now channels continued to broadcast on satellite and cable TV as previously, but the linear That’s TV music channels were closed on 28 February 2026. A full-time That's 60s feed began operating on Pluto TV in July 2026, operating alongside the four already-established That's FAST channels.

== Linear music channels ==
=== That's Melody ===
That's Melody launched on 19 August 2024, replacing That's 80s. That's Melody airs music from the 70s onwards. The channel closed on 28 February 2026.

=== That's Oldies ===
For a brief period in 2021, there was a block on the main channel called That's Golden Oldies. It reappeared in 2024 on That's TV 3. It was later announced that That's Fabulous was being replaced by That's Oldies, which launched on 13 January 2025. This service on Freeview channel 78 in Manchester became That’s Summer on 21 May 2025. The channel returned on 20 August 2025, replacing That's Dance. From 19 November 2025 until 6 January 2026, this channel was rebranded temporarily as That's Christmas. The channel closed on 28 February 2026.

=== That's 80s ===
That's 80s also began as a music block on the local That's TV networks. It launched on 6 January 2023, airing 80s music 24/7. A few days later, a broadcast of That's 80s began transmitting on the Astra satellite; this was added to the Sky satellite EPG on 16 January.

Unlike its 60s sibling, That's 80s was not added to the Freesat EPG but the free-to-air broadcast can be manually tuned-in on Freesat equipment as with other free channels.

From 22 November 2023 until 3 January 2024, That's 80s was rebranded temporarily as Best Xmas Music and became a programming block on the main That's TV channels on 19 August 2024.

The channel returned on 19 November 2025, replacing That's Rock. The channel closed on 28 February 2026.

=== That's 60s ===
That's 60s began as a music block on the local That's TV networks before launching as its own channel on 6 January 2023, replacing Classic Hits. Later replaced by That's Christmas, it continues to air as a block on That's TV 3.

=== That's 70s ===
Similar to That's 60's, That's 70s also began as a music block on the local That's TV networks. It was then launched on its own channel on the 23rd of March, 2023 and on the same day launched as a 24hr stream in Manchester. The service ended on 18 October 2023 and was replaced by That's Christmas until 3 January 2024 when that was replaced with That's TV 2. On 26 December 2025, a That's 70s block returned on That's TV 3.

=== That's 90s ===
That's 90s also began as a music block on the local That's TV networks. They launched a test stream of a That's 90s channel utilising capacity freed up by the earlier closure of Trace Hits. This was added to the Sky electronic programme guide on Wednesday 30 August. In 2023, That's TV tried to launch a national That's 90s channel but it failed to launch with the placeholder being delisted on 23 March 2023, however as a That's 90s placeholder had also replaced a 24-hour That's 70s MCR channel in the Greater Manchester area, a That's 90s channel was launched as a local service in that area. The placeholder for That's 90s was added to Freeview in the Manchester area on 23 August as part of a wider reshuffle of services on the Freeview guide, which also led to the broadcast hours and channel numbers of some other That's TV channels changing, with the channel beginning broadcasting via LCN 86 on 2 September 2023. In October 2023, the national version of this channel finally launched in on LCN 75 with the That's 90s brand also being used as a programming block on the national That's TV channel. On 12 June 2024, the national That's 90s channel was replaced by That's Dance, with the channel continuing for a few months on the Greater Manchester multiplex. On 19 August 2024, That's 90s MCR was replaced by That's Rock MCR, and the satellite feed for That's 90s also became That's Rock.

=== Chart Show Retro ===
Chart Show Retro began a test stream on 23 February 2024 before being added to the electronic programming guide on 4 March 2024. It played back-to-back 80s and 90s music videos, often being the same material broadcast on That's 80s and That's 90s. The channel did not broadcast on Freeview UK.

It has been described (by That's TV) as a "pilot" on the Sky platform, and the channel lasted 4 months before being rebranded as That's Dance on 24 June 2024.

=== That's Fabulous ===
That's Fabulous launched on 18 September 2024 replacing That's Rock, airing mainly American and British pop music from the 21st Century so far, and featuring a look-alike logo like the defunct Heart TV. It was announced that it was going to be replaced by That's Oldies on 13 January 2025.

=== That's Pride ===
Another pop-up channel which appeared in 2025. On 2 June 2025, the channel reverted to programming from That's Dance, even though the channels were still listed as That's Pride and That's Pride MCR on Freeview's EPG until 18 June 2025.

=== That's Dance ===
On 12 June 2024, the "That's 90s" slot on Freeview 76 was renamed to "That's Dance", with the programming launching on 24 June 2024. That's Dance airs dance music from the 80s onwards. From 21 May until 2 June 2025, the channel was temporarily rebranded as That’s Pride. That's Dance was rebranded as That's Oldies on 20 August 2025.

=== That’s Summer ===
That’s Summer launched on 21 May 2025 on Freeview channel 78 in the Manchester area and nationally on Sky, in the channel line-up where That's Oldies used to be. That's Summer was rebranded as That's Rock on 20 August 2025.

=== That's Rock ===
The channel launched on 19 August 2024 as a replacement for That's 90s, after running as a programming block on the national channel That's Memories. That's Rock was rebranded as That's Fabulous on 18 September 2024; That's TV described it as a pop-up channel in the programming description of "That's Rock Closedown". That's Rock returned on 20 August 2025, replacing That's Summer. On 19 November 2025, the channel was renamed as That's 80s.
