= That's Thames Valley =

- Country: United Kingdom
- Broadcast area: Reading, Berkshire
- Network: That's TV

Programming
- Language: English

Ownership
- Owner: That's Media Ltd
- Key people: Daniel Cass
- Sister channels: List: That's Cambridge; That's Cumbria; That's Hampshire; That's Lancashire; That's Lincolnshire; That's Manchester; That's Norfolk; That's North Yorkshire; That's Oxfordshire; That's Salisbury; That's Scotland; That's Solent; That's Surrey; That's Swansea Bay; That's York

History
- Launched: 3 May 2017

Links
- Website: www.thats.tv/thames-valley

Availability

Terrestrial
- Freeview: Channel 7

That's Thames Valley is a local television station serving greater Reading, Berkshire, England. It is owned and operated by That's TV and broadcasts on Freeview channel 7 via the Hannington transmitter and Virgin Media 159 from studios in central Reading.

Ofcom, the national broadcasting regulator, invited licence applications in 2013 and estimated that the service could reach approximately 170,000 homes in the Reading area. That's TV was chosen for Reading in 2014 and the licence for the service was granted in March 2017 for the period 10 May 2017 to 25 November 2025.
