= Solent TV =

Defunct television station on the Isle of Wight, United Kingdom

Ownership
- Owner: Island Volunteers Group

History
- Launched: 31 October 2002
- Replaced: TV12
- Closed: 24 May 2007

Availability at time of closure

Terrestrial
- Analogue: Channel 54 (735.25 MHz) from Rowridge (Isle of Wight)

Solent TV was an independent not-for-profit television channel broadcasting on the Isle of Wight. It was transmitted from the Rowridge transmitter on the Isle of Wight on UHF channel 54 (735.25 MHz), replacing TV12. It began broadcasting in October 2002 but ceased trading on 24 May 2007.

== History ==
The UHF frequency (54) was previously used by TV12, which started broadcasting on 31 October 1998 as the first restricted television service licence station in the United Kingdom. The station broadcast for two two-year licence periods. During the second of the two, the ITC stripped TV12 of its licence, as its rival applicant, Solent TV, had "outweighed" its merits. In addition to these two, there was also a third licence from Wight.TV. Solent TV presented itself with proposals extolling localness, as well as its programming being appealing to all sectors of the population of the Isle of Wight. Broadcasts began on 31 October 2002, when the TV12 licence expired.

== Launch onto Sky Digital platform ==
After a false start in March 2006, the channel launched on the Sky satellite platform (channel 219) on 15 January 2007, just a few months before it ceased broadcasting altogether.

To enable the transition to Sky, Solent TV worked with Sony Broadcast and Broadcast Networks to upgrade Solent TV's technical infrastructure to digital and HD technology. The new equipment included a new Sony XDCAM HD camera system, allowing Solent TV to create all new footage on this format; an HD-ready media server and media management system from Suitcase TV; a Miranda X-Station HD-ready playout system and the new Miranda Kaleido multiview system for playout. To link Solent TV to the Sky platform, a new Broadcast Networks H264 encoder system was used to provide the live link to Globecast, who in turn provided the uplink to Sky.

Until the Sky launch, the channel's content was streamed live in Windows Media format, as well as a collection of video on demand files such as the channel's news programme 'Solent Tonight'. Shortly after the Sky launch the live web stream ceased, and although the on-demand service continued, it was via Flash video format.

== Website ==
The website carried a news and sports service for the Isle of Wight.

The TV station's web site was by 2007 claimed by the station to be receiving over 350,000 unique visits every month. In a BBC report following the station's closure, it was revealed the station claimed it had 70,000 peak time viewers at any one time, although the company earlier in the year said it could not produce viewing figures as it was not on BARB.

== Criticism ==
Some people felt that the station concentrated too heavily on its news output and lost sight of its finances.

Solent TV was positively reviewed by the Guardian TV reviewer Charlie Brooker who said "Solent TV is strikingly confident. Brash, even. It's just like an ITV region circa 1989."

== Financial issues ==
The company's publicly available bank details revealed it lost almost £1,000,000 in the 2006 financial year, more than double its losses in 2005.

Prior to the station's closure, Solent TV director Linda Ovnik stated the station "had not received as much as a 10p piece in public funding". The parent companies of Solent TV were largely funded by public or charitable money and it was suggested at the time of the collapse that this money was used to support Solent TV.

After the station folded, Isle of Wight MP Andrew Turner said he would raise the matter with ministers, and called on the Charity Commissioners to investigate Island Volunteers, the parent company of Solent TV.

In September 2007, several former Solent TV staff – who lost their jobs when the station went bust – won a tribunal hearing for £17,000 for breach of contract after their contracts were terminated without notice.

== Shutdown ==
At the start of 2007, the station was losing several thousand pounds a month but had said that it was on course to reduce its losses dramatically since its move to Sky and the dramatic increase in revenue should have taken it into profit by 2008. A few months later station director Linda Ovnik told the Isle of Wight County Press that the station was "desperately seeking investors". A statement on the Solent TV website on 24 May 2007 read:

Solent TV will stop broadcasting tonight Thursday 24 May 2007 as the company ceases trading because it’s insolvent.
The channel, which started terrestrial transmissions on the Isle of Wight in October 2002, expanded across Europe on the Sky satellite network in January 2007. Financial problems four months later mean company directors have decided to shut down the TV station despite talks with potential investors. Solent TV’s sister organisations, Island Volunteers, Community Solutions and DV Media, are also ceasing to trade. All employees are being made redundant.

Solent TV's final programme was a shorter-than-normal edition of the local news programme, Solent Tonight.
