= Hannington, Hampshire =

Village and parish in Hampshire, England

Coordinates: 51.2944°N 1.2269°W

Hannington
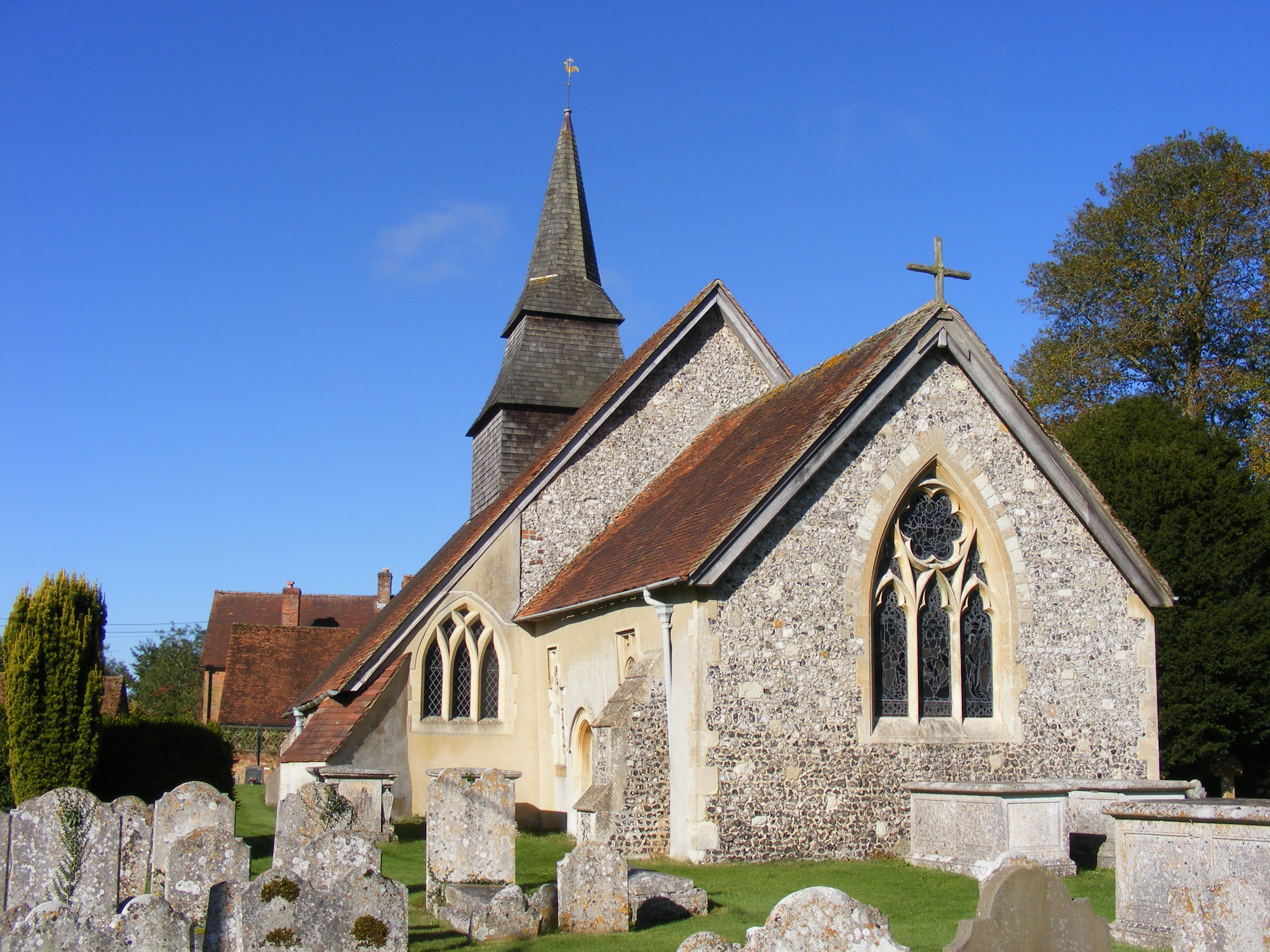
- All Saints' Church, Hannington

- Location within Hampshire
- Population: 493 (2011 Census, including Ibworth and North Oakley)
- District: Basingstoke and Deane
- Shire county: Hampshire
- Region: South East
- Country: England
- Sovereign state: United Kingdom
- Post town: TADLEY
- Postcode district: RG26
- Dialling code: 01635
- Police: Hampshire and Isle of Wight
- Fire: Hampshire and Isle of Wight
- Ambulance: South Central
- UK Parliament: North West Hampshire

Hannington is a civil parish in the English county of Hampshire. It is situated between Basingstoke and Newbury, on the North Hampshire Downs in the North Wessex Downs Area of Outstanding Natural Beauty. In the 2001 census it had a population of 332 people, increasing to 493 at the 2011 Census.

== History and architecture ==
At its centre is the village green, on the edge of which is All Saints' Church, some parts of which date from the 11th century. There are also many buildings listed as Grade II of significant local historical and architectural importance.

The village's only Public House, The Vine At Hannington, has views over the Hampshire Downs and is a popular stopping point for hikers following the Wayfarer's Walk. Originally called The Wellington Arms, the pub stands on land that once belonged to the estate of the Duke of Wellington.

== Governance ==
The village of Hannington is part of the civil parish of Hannington, and is part of the Kingsclere ward of Basingstoke and Deane borough council. The borough council is a Non-metropolitan district of Hampshire County Council.

== Leisure ==
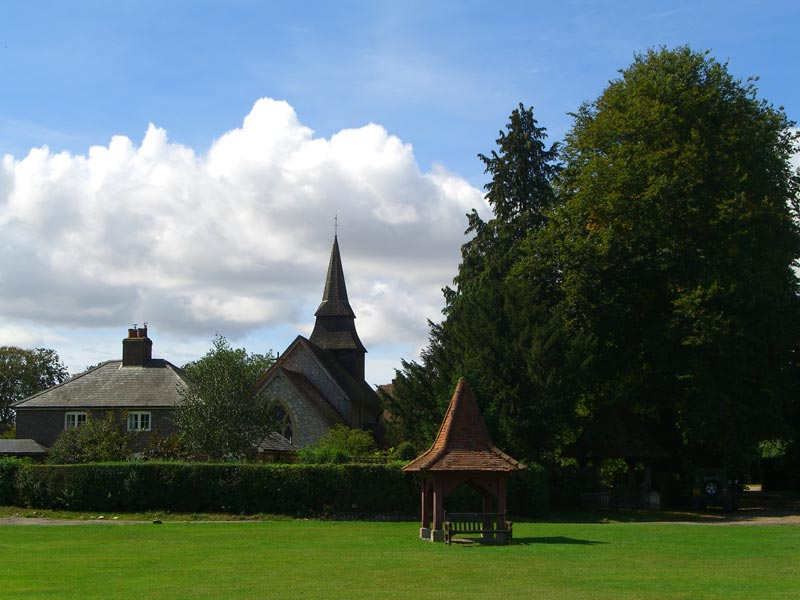
Village Green, Hannington

The Hannington Silver Band celebrated its 90th anniversary in 2014 and plays at churches, fêtes and halls in the area.

The Hannington Country Fair and Barbecue is held every two years on the village green.

== Hannington TV transmitter ==
The Hannington transmitting station is located on Cottington Hill near the village which broadcasts television and radio services to Berkshire, north Hampshire, and parts of Surrey and Wiltshire.

== See also ==
- Hannington transmitting station
