= Tapton Hill transmitting station =

Transmitter station in Sheffield, England

Tapton Hill
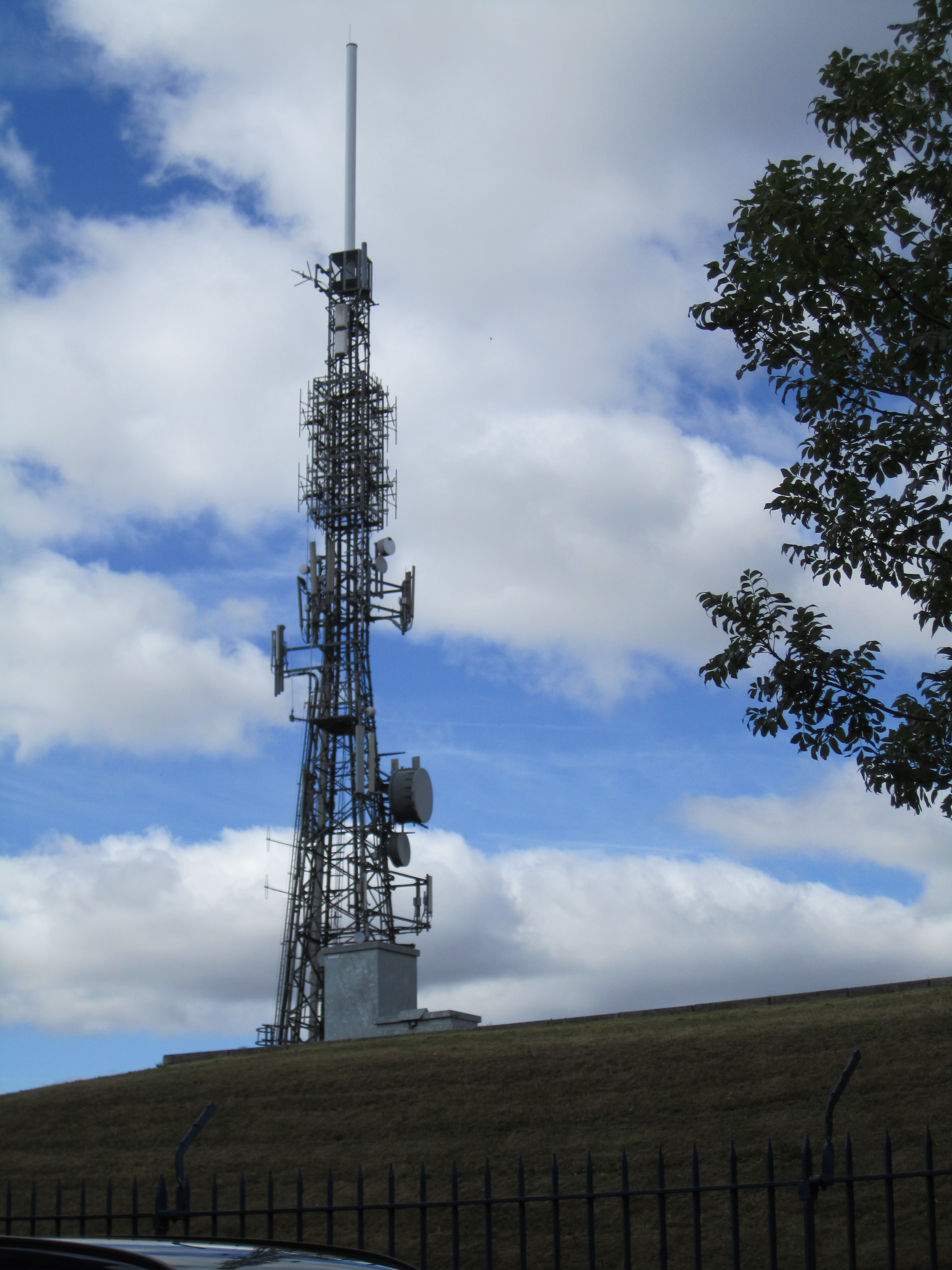

- Tower height: 50 metres (164 ft)
- Coordinates: 53°22′46″N 1°30′49″W
- Grid reference: SK324870
- Built: 2 September 1963
- BBC region: BBC Yorkshire
- ITV region: ITV Yorkshire
- Local TV service: Sheffield Live TV

The Tapton Hill transmitting station (grid reference SK324870), more generally known as the Sheffield (Crosspool) transmitting station, is a broadcasting and telecommunications facility which serves Sheffield in South Yorkshire and is located on a hill in the suburb of Crosspool to the west of the city.

== Transmission ==
It transmits digital television (with vertical polarisation), analogue radio (FM) and DAB digital radio to Sheffield and South Yorkshire. It was used a relay of Emley Moor for analogue television, until the signal was turned off permanently following the Digital Switchover in August 2011. The site is owned by Arqiva and its aerials are at a height of 968 ft (295 metres) above mean sea level. It also feeds the Chesterfield Transmitter with a digital television signal via an underground fibre optic cable.

The transmitter was originally an A group for television broadcasts, but to accommodate analogue Channel 5, as well as digital television, it became a wideband until its switchover in 2011. At that point, technically, it became a K group although wideband aerials would still work. The three main PSB MUXES are all receivable on an A group aerial. Sheffield transmitter's 700MHz clearance was due in February 2020 when none of the main six MUXEs were due to change frequency, though MUXES #7 and #8 were due to be switched off.

== History ==
The site opened as a VHF radio transmitter on Monday 2 September 1963.

== Transmitted services ==
=== Analogue radio (FM VHF) ===
Frequency	kW	Service
88.6 MHz	0.300	BBC Radio Sheffield
89.9 MHz	0.320	BBC Radio 2
92.1 MHz	0.320	BBC Radio 3
93.2 MHz	0.050	Sheffield Live
94.3 MHz	0.320	BBC Radio 4
97.4 MHz	0.400	Hits Radio South Yorkshire
99.5 MHz	0.320	BBC Radio 1
101.7 MHz	0.250	Classic FM
107.7 MHz	0.100	Heart Yorkshire

=== Digital radio (DAB) ===
Frequency	Block	kW	Operator
216.928 MHz	11A	2.80	Sound Digital
220.352 MHz	11C	1.10	Sheffield
222.064 MHz	11D	2.00	Digital One
225.648 MHz	12B	2.00	BBC National DAB

=== Digital television ===
Frequency	UHF	kW	Operator	System
474.166 MHz	21+	1	PSB3 (BBC B)	DVB-T2
498.000 MHz	24	1	PSB2 (D3&4)	DVB-T
522.000 MHz	27	1	PSB1 (BBC A)	DVB-T
586.000 MHz	35	0.4	LTVmux	DVB-T
618.166 MHz	39+	1	COM6 (ARQ B)	DVB-T
642.000 MHz	42	1	COM4 (SDN)	DVB-T
666.000 MHz	45	1	COM5 (ARQ A)	DVB-T

- Aerial group: A/K
- Polarisation: vertical

==== Before switchover ====
Frequency	UHF	kW	Operator
642.000 MHz	42	0.05	Arqiva (Mux D)
666.000 MHz	45	0.05	Arqiva (Mux C)
730.000 MHz	53	0.1	Digital 3&4 (Mux 2)
762.000 MHz	57	0.1	SDN (Mux A)
786.000 MHz	60	0.1	BBC (Mux B)
810.000 MHz	63†	0.1	BBC (Mux 1)

† On UHF 39 until 17 March 2010.

=== Analogue television ===
Analogue television broadcasts permanently ended from Tapton Hill on 24 August 2011. BBC Two transmissions previously ceased on 10 August.

Frequency	UHF	kW	Service
471.25 MHz	21	5	Channel 4
495.25 MHz	24	5	Yorkshire
519.25 MHz	27	5	BBC2 Yorkshire
551.25 MHz	31	5	BBC1 Yorkshire
839.25 MHz	67	2.5	Channel 5

- Aerial group: A/W
- Polarisation: vertical

== See also ==
- Belmont transmitting station
- Emley Moor transmitting station
- Waltham transmitting station
