= TV12 (Isle of Wight) =

Defunct television station on the Isle of Wight, United Kingdom

- Country: United Kingdom
- Broadcast area: Isle of Wight

Programming
- Language: English

Ownership
- Owner: TV 12 Limited

History
- Launched: 31 October 1998
- Closed: 31 October 2002 (4 years, 0 days)
- Replaced by: Solent TV

Availability (at time of closure)

Terrestrial
- Rowridge transmitting station: Channel 54

TV12 was a local commercial television station for the Isle of Wight, the first television station to operate with a restricted television service licence. It began broadcasting on 31 October 1998 and covered an audience of 600,000 viewers, in both the Isle of Wight proper and the part of the British mainland on the northern side of The Solent. Broadcasting from a converted caretake bungalow at a school in Newport, it ran for two consecutive two-year licences, and lost in 2002 to Solent TV, leading to its closure after four years on air.

== History ==
A television station for the Isle of Wight was first considered by future staff member Paul Mead, who had previously worked at NBC and CBS affiliates in the US state of Washington, and then at a community television station in southern Utah. His initial plan was to make it a cable channel, but later changed it to a terrestrial station. The idea was conceived during Mead's time working at Meridian Television, the local ITV company.

TV12 was being set up in early 1998 by Graham Benson, chairman and CEO of his production company Blue Heaven Productions (producers of The Ruth Rendell Mysteries); he eventually became chairman of the station. The station was the first out of a prospective fifty applicants for RSL television stations. As of late September, Paul Meade was the station's head. The station planned to emphasise its hyper-local characteristics, as, despite its wider coverage area, it would only concentrate on the Isle of Wight. Its annual budget on the verge of launching was of £250,000.

TV12 started broadcasting on 31 October 1998, covering the Isle of Wight, Portsmouth, Southampton and the New Forest. Its launch team consisted of twelve staff, seven cameras and one studio.

On 2 July 1999, Allan McKeown, founder of production company SelecTV, invested over £100,000 into the station. On 1 October, Andy Allan, formerly of Carlton Television, joined the station's board, followed on 22 October by former London's Burning producer Paul Knight, who also acquired 5% of the station's shares. Despite these investments, TV12 was beginning to operate in the red in its first year. Andy Allen lost £50,000 and subsequently left the station.

By the summer of 2000, the staff slightly increased from 12 to 15, while the station scored peak time ratings of around 9,000 viewers in the island alone, and a further 20,000 in the English mainland.

On the late afternoon of 19 July 2002, the ITC announced that TV12 was stripped of its licence and would hand over to Solent TV Ltd., owned by Island Volunteers, once the second two-year licence expired on 31 October.

== Programming ==
TV12 launched with 23 programmes a week, broadcast between 5pm and 11pm every evening. The rest of the schedule was filled by a community information service. All programmes were local in this phase, some programmes included Club 98, which toured local clubs, chat show Hannam featuring "local island characters", and dramas produced by The Ferret Theatre Company. Less than two years later, the amount of local programmes fell to 17. During this time, there was the film review programme Widescreen and Behind the News, a panel news analysis programme. It also started relaying selected Sky News bulletins and simulcasts of QVC, as well as airing the syndicated show Movies, Games and Videos. During 2000, it also relayed Bloomberg Television. In 2002, the station aired The Adventures of Stephen Brown, a science fiction drama, inspired by Doctor Who and made by Beacon Productions.

Highlights of John Hannam's talk shows on TV12 were released on DVD in late 2020.
