= Hannington transmitting station =

Television and radio transmitting station in Kingsclere

Hannington
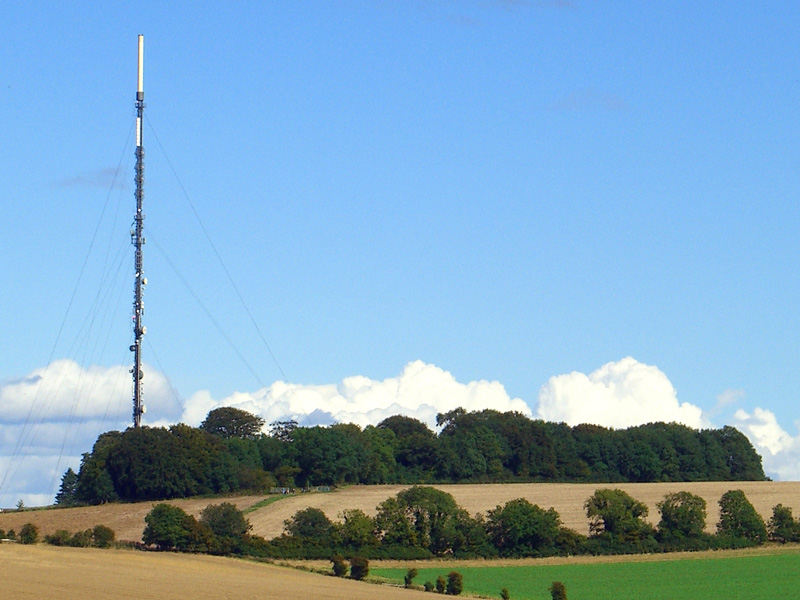
- Transmission Mast, Cottington Hill

- Location within Hampshire
- Mast height: 151.9 metres (498 ft)
- Coordinates: 51.3080°N 1.2447°W
- Built: 1970
- BBC region: BBC South
- ITV region: ITV Meridian (Thames Valley)
- Local TV service: That's Thames Valley

Hannington transmitting station is a television and radio transmitting station located on Cottington Hill near the village of Hannington, Hampshire. The transmitter is actually in the parish of Kingsclere. The station provides broadcast services to Berkshire, north Hampshire and parts of Surrey and Wiltshire, and includes a 131.4-metre (431 ft) guyed steel lattice mast. This includes cities and towns such as Basingstoke, Reading, Farnborough, Winchester, Andover, Newbury, Amesbury and Camberley. Surmounting the mast is a GRP aerial cylinder, which contains the UHF television transmitting antennas, which brings the overall height of the mast to 151.9 metres (498 ft).

Hannington's digital broadcasts were severely attenuated to the east before the digital switchover (DSO) so as not to cause co-channel interference with Guildford transmitter. Those restrictions were removed soon after DSO in 2012.

The transmitter has 8 local relays: Alton, Aldbourne, Chisbury, Hemdean, Hurstbourne Tarrant, Lambourn, The Bournes and Tidworth.

== Broadcast interruptions ==
=== 1977 Ashtar Galactic Command message ===
On Saturday 26 November 1977 at around 5:10 pm, the Southern ITV broadcast from this transmitter had its UHF sound transmission hi-jacked by unknown agents. At that time Hannington re-broadcast off-air UHF transmissions from Rowridge on the Isle of Wight. The UHF audio signal from Rowridge was swamped by a signal presumably from a location much closer to the Hannington transmitter, overriding the sound of the local ITV station Southern Television and broadcast their own audio message purporting to be from Vrillon, an alien from an institution calling itself the Ashtar Galactic Command. The message, transmitted over an ITN News bulletin and a subsequent Merrie Melodies cartoon, lasted six minutes.

Despite extensive investigations by Hampshire Police, the Independent Broadcasting Authority and Southern Television, those responsible have never been identified, and the potential culprits have ranged from students to university professors to disgruntled television technicians.

=== 1994 World Cup Final blackout ===
On 17 July 1994 vandals sabotaged the mast's power supply during the 1994 FIFA World Cup Final, meaning that hundreds of thousands of viewers missed about an hour of the match.

== Services available ==
=== Analogue radio ===
Frequency	kW	Service
102.9 MHz	4	Heart South
104.1 MHz	3	BBC Radio Berkshire

=== Digital radio ===
Frequency	Block	kW	Operator
222.064 MHz	11D	4.8	Digital One
225.648 MHz	12B	5	BBC National DAB
229.072 MHz	12D	1	NOW Berkshire & North Hampshire

=== Digital television ===
Frequency	UHF	kW	Operator	System
618.000 MHz	39	50	BBC B	DVB-T2
626.000 MHz	40	25	SDN	DVB-T
642.000 MHz	42	50	Digital 3&4	DVB-T
650.000 MHz	43	25	Arqiva A	DVB-T
666.000 MHz	45	50	BBC A	DVB-T
674.000 MHz	46	25	Arqiva B	DVB-T
746.000 MHz	55	36.7	COM7	DVB-T2

==== Before switchover ====
All remaining Low power DVB-T transmission ceased on 22 February 2012. BBC Mux 1 was switched off on 8 February 2012

Frequency	UHF	kW	Operator
626.166 MHz	40+	20	SDN (Mux A)
634.166 MHz	41+	10	Arqiva (Mux D)
650.166 MHz	43+	20	Digital 3&4 (Mux 2)
658.166 MHz	44+	10	Arqiva (Mux C)
674.166 MHz	46+	20	BBC (Mux B)
706.000 MHz	50	20	BBC (Mux 1)

=== Analogue television ===
Analogue television transmissions ceased from Hannington during February 2012; BBC2 analogue closed on UHF 45 on 8 February 2012 and all other analogue services closed on 22 February 2012.

Frequency	UHF	kW	Service
583.25 MHz	35	60	Channel 5
615.25 MHz	39	250	BBC1 South
639.25 MHz	42	250	Meridian
663.25 MHz	45	250	BBC2 South
831.25 MHz	66	250	Channel 4

- Aerial group: E
- Polarisation: horizontal
