= Rowridge transmitting station =

Telecommunications transmission site on the Isle of Wight, England

Rowridge
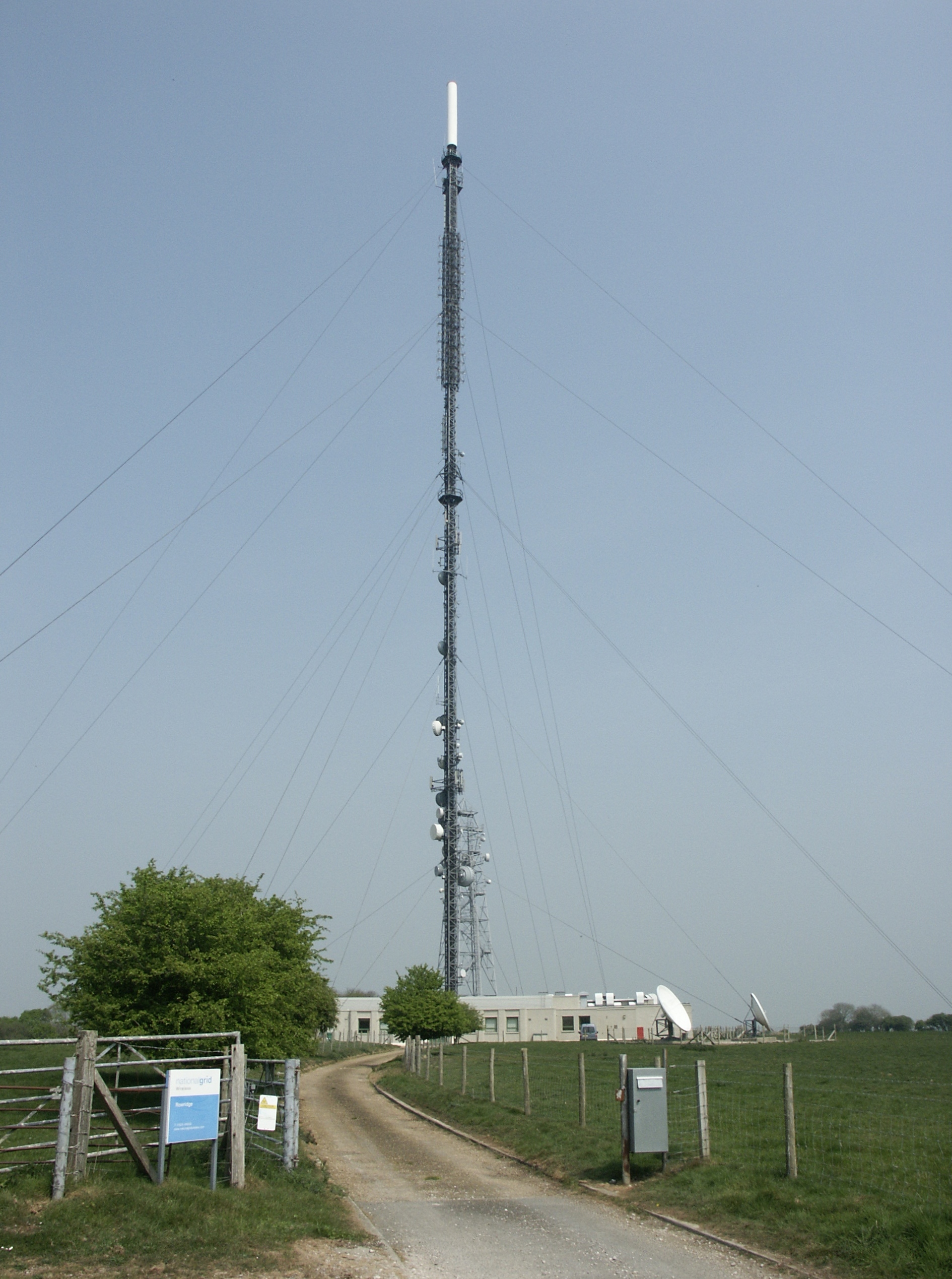
- The Rowridge transmitting station

- Location within Isle of Wight
- Mast height: 149.6 metres (491 ft)
- Coordinates: 50.676389°N 1.368611°W
- Grid reference: SZ447865
- BBC region: BBC South
- ITV region: Southern (1969–1981); TVS (1982–1992); ITV Meridian (1993–present)
- Local TV service: That's Solent

The Rowridge transmitting station is a facility for FM radio and television transmission at Rowridge on the Isle of Wight in southern England.

It currently has a 172-metre (564 ft) tall guyed mast, owned and operated by Arqiva (previously National Grid Wireless). There is a smaller tower on the site belonging to British Telecom. Prior to Digital Switchover (DSO) the station broadcast with a power of 250 kW (ERP) for FM radio, 500 kW for analogue television, and 20 kW for digital television. In July 2007, Ofcom confirmed that Rowridge would remain an A Group transmitter at Digital switchover; the digital television transmission signal was then boosted to 200 kW. From March 2018 MUXES 7 & 8 moved out of the A group to channels 55 & 56, though these are due to be turned off between 2020 and 2022.

Rowridge is one of only two main transmitters (the other is the rather smaller transmitter of Rosneath in Scotland) to broadcast its output on both horizontal and vertical polarities. Only the main 6 MUXES are transmitted in vertical polarity. The reason for this dual polarity transmission is to give a second option to those experiencing co-channel interference from transmitters on the continent.

Analogue Channel 5 was not transmitted from Rowridge but was broadcast (at 10 kW) from Fawley Power Station, with the antenna located on the main chimney. Transmissions all fitted within the A group and were horizontally polarised. On 25 March 2009, Channel 5's analogue signal was turned off from Fawley Power Station, due to the digital switchover in the neighbouring Westcountry region. Channel 5 was also broadcast from Salisbury on channel 68 Population coverage for the main four analogue channels was about 1.75 million.

== History ==
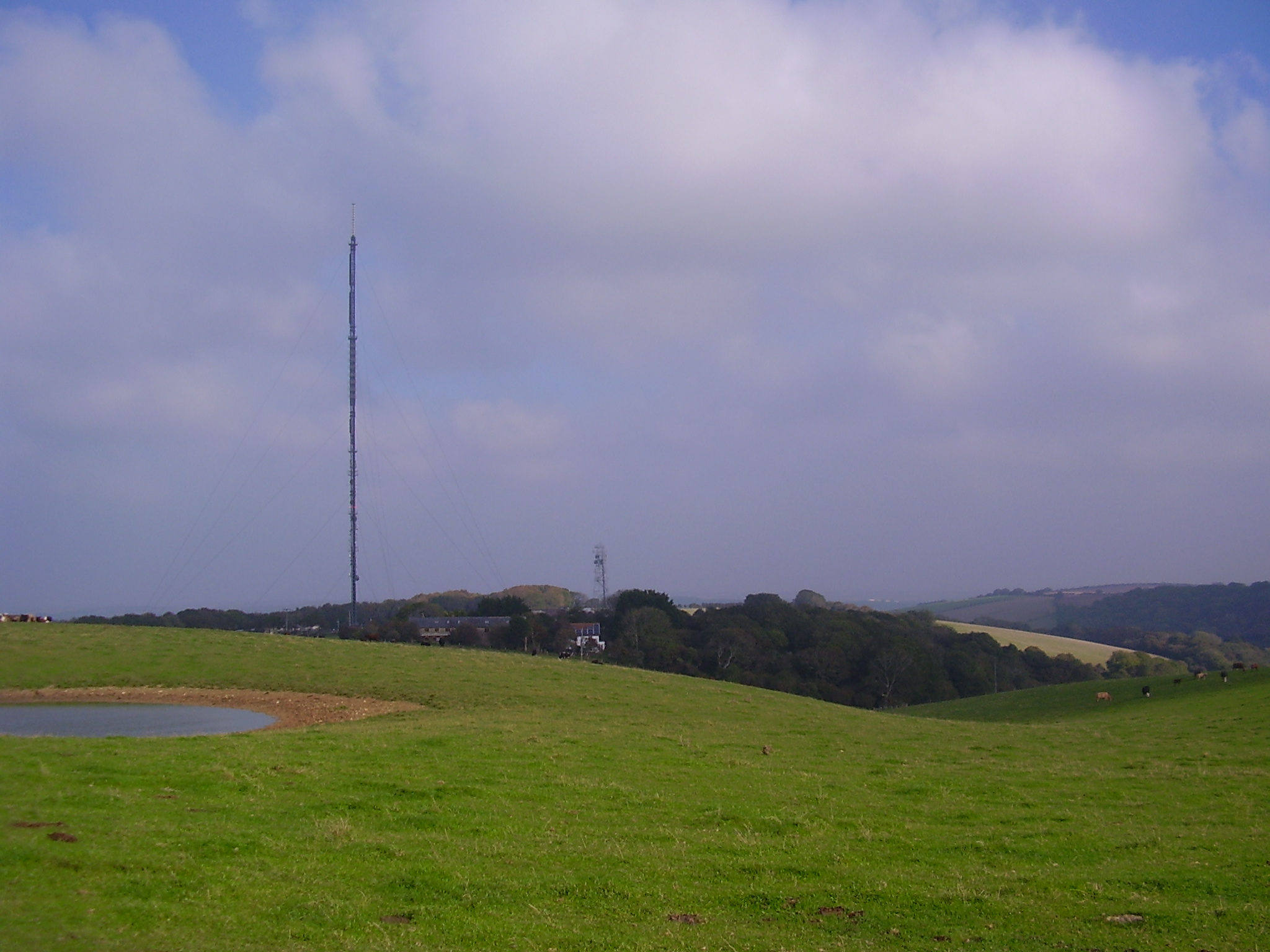

The station was first built to provide BBC 405-line television coverage for an area including Southampton, Portsmouth, Bournemouth, Dorchester, Chichester, Brighton, Winchester and Salisbury. Sites on the mainland and the Isle of Wight were considered, and three were tested by BBC Research Department.

=== Construction ===
A temporary 200 ft lattice mast was built with a main antenna at 175 ft and a reserve antenna lower down. These aerials were directional to enhance the signal northwards and reduce unwanted coverage to the south.

It was built by BICC, alongside Pontop Pike (also 500 ft) and North Hessary Tor in Devon (a taller mast).

The ITA wanted to build a mast nearby on Chillerton Down, but in February 1957 the local council rejected the planning proposal, and wanted a joint transmitter, not two. The ITA mast was built subsequently in 1958.

On 17 June 1963 the local council gave planning permission for a joint ITA-BBC mast, 1,050 ft, for UHF 625 line television.

=== Transmission ===
Test transmissions were from 18 October 1954. Television reception would stretch from Somerset to Sussex. Sussex had a previous 'booster' transmitter on Truleigh Hill in Upper Beeding.

The service opened on 12 November 1954, bringing television to the area for the first time.

A programme feed was obtained via a Post Office radio link, using refurbished equipment that provided the original picture feed for the Wenvoe Transmitter on the British Telecom Microwave Network. A site for this near Alton, Hampshire was acquired and named after a nearby pub: Golden Pot. Here the TV signal from Alexandra Palace was picked up and relayed via a one-hop 4 GHz microwave link to Rowridge.

The microwave link from Hampshire was brought into service on 18 October 1954. Later, the microwave link ran from the Museum telephone exchange in London to Rowridge, using Golden Pot as an intermediate site.

A better transmitter would be fitted after a year, which was fitted in May 1956. National radio on VHF was to be added by 1957.

In 1965 the UHF antenna was added making the total height of the structure 149.6 metres (491 ft). This addition allowed Rowridge to radiate the PAL 625-line transmission that allowed broadcasts in colour and eventually stereo sound, using NICAM.

BBC2 was planned to arrive on 14 November 1965 on 625 lines, but test transmissions would start on 18 December 1965, with full broadcasts from 16 January 1966.

On the neighbouring ITA mast, the ITA expected colour transmissions by late 1969.

On 25 March 2009, Channel 5's analogue signal was turned off from Fawley Power Station. Later on in the day, "existing digital terrestrial TV services moved to new frequencies", due to the digital switchover happening in the region in 2012.

Arqiva applied for planning permission to replace the existing 150m (492') mast with one 187m (614') high on 22 May 2009.

== Channels listed by frequency ==
=== Analogue radio ===
Frequency	kW	Service
88.5 MHz	250	BBC Radio 2
90.7 MHz	250	BBC Radio 3
92.9 MHz	250	BBC Radio 4
96.1 MHz	10	BBC Radio Solent
98.2 MHz	250	BBC Radio 1
100.3 MHz	250	Classic FM

=== Digital radio ===
Frequency	Block	kW	Operator
225.648 MHz	12B	5	BBC National DAB

=== Analogue television ===
==== 12 November 1954 – 15 January 1966 ====
Frequency	VHF	kW	Service
56.75 MHz	3	100	BBC Television

==== 15 January 1966 – 13 December 1969 ====
Frequency	VHF	UHF	kW	Service
56.75 MHz	3	—	100	BBC1 South
495.25 MHz	—	24	500	BBC2 South

==== 13 December 1969 – 27 December 1969 ====
Frequency	VHF	UHF	kW	Service
56.75 MHz	3	—	100	BBC1 South
495.25 MHz	—	24	500	BBC2 South
519.25 MHz	—	27	500	Southern

==== 27 December 1969 – 4 December 1982 ====
Frequency	VHF	UHF	kW	Service
56.75 MHz	3		100	BBC1 South
495.25 MHz	—	24	500	BBC2 South
519.25 MHz	—	27	500	TVS (Southern until 1982)
551.25 MHz	—	31	500	BBC1

==== 4 December 1982 – 3 January 1985 ====
Frequency	VHF	UHF	kW	Service
56.75 MHz	3	—	100	BBC1 South
471.25 MHz	—	21	500	Channel 4
495.25 MHz	—	24	500	BBC2 South
519.25 MHz	—	27	500	TVS
551.25 MHz	—	31	500	BBC1

==== 3 January 1985 – 31 October 1998 ====
THE 405 line television system was switched off on that day after 31 years of BBC One

Frequency	UHF	kW	Service
471.25 MHz	21	500	Channel 4
495.25 MHz	24	500	BBC2 South
519.25 MHz	27	500	Meridian (TVS until 1993)
551.25 MHz	31	500	BBC1 South

==== 31 October 1998 – 15 November 1998 ====
TV12 was launched on UHF 54

Frequency	UHF	kW	Service
471.25 MHz	21	500	Channel 4
495.25 MHz	24	500	BBC2 South
519.25 MHz	27	500	Meridian (TVS until 1993)
551.25 MHz	31	500	BBC1 South
735.25 MHz	54	2	TV12

=== Analogue and digital television ===
This was where the Digital TV launched, at first, digital TV was low.

==== 15 November 1998 – 31 October 2002 ====
Frequency	UHF	kW	Service	System
471.25 MHz	21	500	Channel 4	PAL System I
489.833 MHz	23-	20	BBC (Mux 1)	DVB-T
495.25 MHz	24	500	BBC2 South	PAL System I
513.833 MHz	26-	20	Arqiva (Mux C)	DVB-T
519.25 MHz	27	500	Meridian	PAL System I
530.000 MHz	28	20	Digital 3&4 (Mux 2)	DVB-T
546.000 MHz	30	20	SDN (Mux A)	DVB-T
551.25 MHz	31	500	BBC1 South	PAL System I
562.166 MHz	32+	20	BBC (Mux B)	DVB-T
570.166 MHz	33+	20	Arqiva (Mux D)	DVB-T
735.25 MHz	54	2	TV12	PAL System I

==== 31 October 2002 – 24 May 2007 ====
On October 31 2002 Solent TV replaced TV12 on UHF 54.

Frequency	UHF	kW	Service	System
471.25 MHz	21	500	Channel 4	PAL System I
489.833 MHz	23-	20	BBC (Mux 1)	DVB-T
495.25 MHz	24	500	BBC2 South	PAL System I
513.833 MHz	26-	20	Arqiva (Mux C)	DVB-T
519.25 MHz	27	500	Meridian	PAL System I
530.000 MHz	28	20	Digital 3&4 (Mux 2)	DVB-T
546.000 MHz	30	20	SDN (Mux A)	DVB-T
551.25 MHz	31	500	BBC1 South	PAL System I
562.166 MHz	32+	20	BBC (Mux B)	DVB-T
570.166 MHz	33+	20	Arqiva (Mux D)	DVB-T
735.25 MHz	54	2	Solent TV	PAL System I

==== 24 May 2007 – 25 March 2009 ====
Solent TV ceased on UHF 54

Frequency	UHF	kW	Service	System
471.25 MHz	21	500	Channel 4	PAL System I
489.833 MHz	23-	20	BBC (Mux 1)	DVB-T
495.25 MHz	24	500	BBC2 South	PAL System I
513.833 MHz	26-	20	Arqiva (Mux C)	DVB-T
519.25 MHz	27	500	Meridian	PAL System I
530.000 MHz	28	20	Digital 3&4 (Mux 2)	DVB-T
546.000 MHz	30	20	SDN (Mux A)	DVB-T
551.25 MHz	31	500	BBC1 South	PAL System I
562.166 MHz	32+	20	BBC (Mux B)	DVB-T
570.166 MHz	33+	20	Arqiva (Mux D)	DVB-T

==== 25 March 2009 – 7 March 2012 ====
C5 was switched off from the Fawley Power Station

Frequency	UHF	kW	Service	System
471.25 MHz	21	500	Channel 4	PAL System I
495.25 MHz	24	500	BBC2 South	PAL System I
519.25 MHz	27	500	Meridian	PAL System I
530.166 MHz	28+	20	BBC (Mux B)	DVB-T
545.833 MHz	30-	20	SDN (Mux A)	DVB-T
551.25 MHz	31	500	BBC1 South	PAL System I
562.166 MHz	32+	20	Digital 3&4 (Mux 2)	DVB-T
570.166 MHz	33+	20	Arqiva (Mux D)	DVB-T
578.000 MHz	34	20	BBC (Mux 1)	DVB-T
602.166 MHz	37+	20	Arqiva (Mux C)	DVB-T

==== 7 March 2012 – 21 March 2012 ====
BBC2 South was switched off on UHF CHANNEL 24, AND BBC A launched on BBC2'S old channel number.

Frequency	UHF	kW		Service	System
Frequency	UHF	H	V	Service	System
471.25 MHz	21	500	—	Channel 4	PAL System I
498.000 MHz	24	200	200	BBC A	DVB-T
519.25 MHz	27	500	—	Meridian	PAL System I
530.166 MHz	28+	20	—	BBC (Mux B)	DVB-T
545.833 MHz	30-	20	—	SDN (Mux A)	DVB-T
551.25 MHz	31	500	—	BBC1 South	PAL System I
562.166 MHz	32+	20	—	Digital 3&4 (Mux 2)	DVB-T
570.166 MHz	33+	20	—	Arqiva (Mux D)	DVB-T
602.166 MHz	37+	20	—	Arqiva (Mux C)	DVB-T

=== Digital television ===
==== 21 March 2012 – 18 April 2012 ====
All Analogue TV services Ceased after 58 years of service.

Frequency	UHF	kW		Operator	System
Frequency	UHF	H	V	Operator	System
474.166 MHz	21+	200	200	BBC B	DVB-T2
498.000 MHz	24	200	200	BBC A	DVB-T
522.000 MHz	27	200	200	Digital 3&4	DVB-T
545.833 MHz	30-	50	—	SDN	DVB-T
570.166 MHz	33+	50	—	Arqiva B	DVB-T
602.166 MHz	37+	50	—	Arqiva A	DVB-T

==== 18 April 2012 – present ====
The commercial multiplexes were situated on their pre-DSO frequencies until 18 April 2012, when they started transmitting at vertical polarisation.

Frequency	UHF	kW		Operator	System
Frequency	UHF	H	V	Operator	System
474.166 MHz	21+	200	200	BBC B	DVB-T2
482.166 MHz	22+	50	200	Arqiva A	DVB-T
498.000 MHz	24	200	200	BBC A	DVB-T
506.000 MHz	25	50	200	SDN	DVB-T
522.000 MHz	27	200	200	Digital 3&4	DVB-T
530.000 MHz	28	50	200	Arqiva B	DVB-T
602.000 MHz	37	10	-	Local Multiplex	DVB-T

== See also ==
- Chillerton Down – a transmission site approximately 2.5 miles (4.0 km) from Rowridge, broadcasting a mix of analogue and digital radio stations not available from Rowridge
- List of masts
