= That's Solent =

That's TV Solent
- Country: United Kingdom
- Broadcast area: The Solent
- Network: That's TV

Programming
- Language: English

Ownership
- Owner: That's Media Ltd
- Key people: Daniel Cass
- Sister channels: That's Manchester That's Thames Valley

History
- Launched: 26 November 2014

Links
- Website: www.thats.tv/solent

Availability

Terrestrial
- Freeview: Channel 7

That's TV Solent is a local television station in The Solent region of England, owned and operated by That's TV.

== Background ==
That's Solent is a local TV channel, that according to Ofcom (the UK telecoms regulator), broadcasts to Portsmouth including Gosport, Fareham and parts of the Isle of Wight, Southampton, Eastleigh and Winchester. Ofcom granted a licence to That's Solent on 14 August 2014 with a commencement date of 26 November 2014 and the licence, subject to conditions, will remain in force until 25 November 2025.

The original plan was for That's Solent to be launched on 26 June 2014, but this was postponed until 22 October 2014. The station finally went live on 26 November 2014.

In March 2016, the station was placed on notice by Ofcom over persistent technical issues in its programming, along with its sister stations, That's Manchester and That's Oxfordshire.

In July 2018, former That's Solent journalist Dale McEwan reported his own experiences of working for the station. He listed poor pay and exhausting hours among his concerns. He also revealed that That's Solent sent 1,207 stories to the BBC in year one (November 2014 to November 2015) but the BBC used only 114 (9.4% of stories), equating to a cost of £1,315.79 per story. The National Union of Journalists in Scotland said it was "deeply concerned" by McEwan's revelations and news that That's TV was launching five stations in Scotland.

== Company ==
That's Solent Limited was licensed by Ofcom in 2012 after a bidding process. That's Solent Ltd is owned by SIX TV Ltd, trading as That's TV, with That's Media Ltd as the ultimate parent company.

== Broadcasting and reception ==
That's Solent is broadcast from the Rowridge transmitting station on the Isle of Wight and covers the area around the Solent and Southampton Water. It broadcasts on Freeview channel 7 and is also available on Wightfibre. The studios are based in Cosham, Portsmouth.

== Programming ==
The channel features a Monday to Friday evening news programme called Solent Headline News.

It also broadcasts a talk show Talk Solent which features discussion of local news and stories making the headlines.

The channel is backed by Newsquest and Johnston Press, who own the Southern Daily Echo and Portsmouth's The News, who will provide the local news content for the channel.

In 2017 That's Solent simulcast Talking Pictures TV during the day, but following the expiry of this agreement at the end of the year, the channel started to screen a mixture of public domain films and cartoons from the Timeless catalogue in its place. This ended in February 2019 and daytime hours are now given over to simulcasts of the TJC and Ideal World home shopping channels.

== See also ==
- List of television stations in the United Kingdom
- Local television in the United Kingdom
