= That's Manchester =

Local TV station in Manchester, England

- Country: United Kingdom
- Broadcast area: Greater Manchester
- Network: That's TV

Programming
- Language: English

Ownership
- Owner: That's Media Ltd
- Key people: Daniel Cass
- Sister channels: List: That's Cambridge; That's Cumbria; That's Hampshire; That's Lancashire; That's Lincolnshire; That's Norfolk; That's North Yorkshire; That's Oxfordshire; That's Salisbury; That's Scotland; That's Solent; That's Surrey; That's Swansea Bay; That's Thames Valley; That's York

History
- Launched: 31 May 2015

Links
- Website: www.thats.tv/manchester/

Availability

Terrestrial
- Freeview: Channel 7

That's Manchester is a local television station serving Greater Manchester. It is owned and operated by That's TV and broadcasts on Freeview channel 7 from studios at The Flint Glass Works in the Ancoats suburb of Manchester.

== Overview ==
Before the launch of That's Manchester, Channel M had broadcast a locally focused television service for Greater Manchester from February 2000 until April 2012, when the service was deemed unviable to continue by its owners.

In 2013, as part of a national roll-out of local television in the United Kingdom, the broadcast regulator Ofcom awarded the licence to Your TV Manchester, but the channel failed to launch within the two year time frame as stipulated by Ofcom. The company, which also won a licence to service the Preston and Blackpool areas, had beaten four other bids - Made in Manchester, Manchester News Channel, MCR TV and Metro8 Manchester.

That's TV subsequently took over the licence, and in May 2015, Ofcom granted That's Manchester a ten-and-a-half year licence to provide a local television service. A soft launch of the channel took place at 9pm on Sunday 31 May 2015.

In March 2016, the station was placed on notice by Ofcom over persistent technical issues in its programming, along with its sister stations, That's Oxfordshire and That's Solent.

The station broadcasts to its licence area from the Winter Hill transmitter via a directional localised signal beam on Freeview channel 7, but is not available on satellite or cable.

== Programming ==
Along with all of the That's TV stations, That's Manchester programming consisted of a single news bulletin, shown on a loop during the evening and overnight, with teleshopping and old films broadcast during the day. However, after their deal with classic movie provider Timeless expired, That's TV started to simulcast various TV shopping and reality TV shows on their channels before bringing in more music programming in the evening.

By 2020 That's Manchester had become reduced to a 10-minute local news slot at 6pm, with music video shows networked under the 'That's 70s', 'That's 80s' and 'That's 90s' section name in the afternoon and night (TJC - The Jewellery Channel was still being simulcast in the morning). In November 2020, the newly rebranded That's Christmas started broadcasting the "Retro Disco Christmas Party" in its music video slot, with a mixture of Christmas classics and 'Europop/Party Tunes' from the 70s, 80s and 90s being played back-to-back The channel then became That's New Year, before reverting to separate blocks of That's 70s, That's 80s and That's 90s music video selections in 2021 (with the teleshopping continuing as well)

On 5 January 2021 rival operator Local Television Limited (LOCAL TV) launched a second local channel for Mancunians on the GImux multiplex (G-MAN). Called Manchester TV, the service on channel 99 debuted LOCAL TV's new 'L7' branding and had a schedule similar to other channels in the LOCAL TV portfolio with a mixture of CBS Reality programmes and news from across the UK (though Manchester-specific news content is due to follow).

As of October 2021, the channel is simulcasting the That's TV Gold schedule with opt-outs for the short evening news bulletin each weekday night and a rolling news service at 3am replacing the usual late night music video slot (for example That's Classic Rock at the weekends). On 9 October 2021, That's TV Manchester started to replace their Gold channel's That's 70s - The Best Music programme at the weekend with the Manchester Music Marathon, a local music slot at 6pm, going out between back-to-back repeats of The Kenny Everett Video Show's first two series, on its first showing.

=== Previous programming ===
Apart from the station's main news programme, Manchester Headline News, programming included current affairs programmes Now We're Talking, Advice Show and The Big Debate, offbeat news show Student Speak, arts and culture show That's Chatty, and specialist shows such as That's Pride and The Geek Show. These programmes were dropped in 2017.

== Sister channels ==
Unlike That's TV national slots on Freeview which operate on a hybrid part-time/streaming basis, That's TV has secured a number of 24 hour slots on the Greater Manchester local multiplex area for their sister channels, with That's TV (UK) MCR, That's TV 2 MCR, That’s TV 3 MCR and a trio of music channels available on Freeview in Greater Manchester of 12 July 2024.

=== That's TV 2 MCR ===
That’s TV 2 MCR was launched on 3 January 2024 in the place of the Christmas channel with repeats of Home and Away, showing from the start 35 years after it was first broadcast, with Channel 4’s Humans and Prisoner: Cell Block H in the first night line-up, joining shows already shown on their main channel like Baywatch, Bread and The Likely Lads. Even though most marketing in the press focused on the rerunning of Home and Away from the start, on 12 January 2024 the repeats were taken out of the schedule and replaced with 80s pop videos, Blankety Blank, old ITV sitcoms and new to the network episodes of Would I Lie to You? Australia. In addition to axing Home and Away after 18 episodes, repeats of the Channel 4 science fiction television series Humans were moved from 9:00pm to after midnight with the episodes shown out of order. As of 15 January 2024, the channel was still broadcasting Baywatch and Prisoner: Cell Block H in their usual slots, but is repeating episodes of Little Britain, Bread, Up Pompeii!, Secret Diary of a Call Girl, Great British Railway Journeys, Blankety Blank, The League of Gentlemen, The Jerry Springer Show, Grace & Favour, Baywatch, Fat Friends, The Kenny Everett Video Show, Steptoe & Son and The Benny Hill Show, a day after being shown on the main That's TV UK channel.

=== That’s TV 3 MCR ===
This channel was added as a placeholder on 12 June 2024 on channel 95, along with the national That’s Memories channel on channel 71.

=== That's TV music channels ===
On 24 August 2022, that's TV took over Country Music Entertainment's Freeview slot on channel 91 and launched Classic Hits MCR, which became That’s 80s MCR on 5 January 2023 as That's TV launched a number of decade themed music channels. These were That’s 60s, That’s 70s and That’s 80s, with That’s 60s getting an additional 24 hour 'MCR' simulcast on channel 87 and That’s 70s only being seen in the area on channel 76. As of 3 January 2024, That's 60 MCR, That's 80s and That's 90s MCR were available on Freeview in Greater Manchester. with pop videos also shown during the day on That's TV 2 MCR. On 12 June 2024, That's TV refreshed their channel portfolio with That's 60s MCR (channel 77), That’s 90s MCR (channel 78) and That’s Dance MCR (channel 80) now being their music channels in the Greater Manchester area on Freeview. and as of January 2025, the line-up was That's Melody MCR, That's Oldies, That's Dance MCR, That's TV 2 MCR and That's TV 3 MCR.

== See also ==
- List of television stations in the United Kingdom
- Local television in the United Kingdom
