= Sheffield Live =

Community radio and TV station

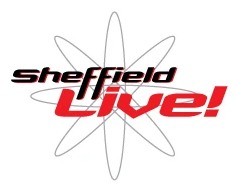
- Country: United Kingdom
- Broadcast area: South Yorkshire & North Derbyshire
- Headquarters: The Television Centre, 15 Paternoster Row, Sheffield

Programming
- Language: English

Ownership
- Owner: Sheffield Local Television

History
- Launched: September 23, 2014

Links
- Webcast: tv.sheffieldlive.org
- Website: sheffieldlive.org

Availability

Terrestrial
- Freeview: Channel 7

Sheffield Live! 93.2 FM
- Sheffield; United Kingdom
- Broadcast area: West Sheffield
- Frequency: 93.2 MHz

Ownership
- Owner: Sheffield Community Media (Commedia Sheffield)

History
- First air date: October 29, 2007

Links
- Website: sheffieldlive.org

Sheffield Live! is a local community radio station, and formerly a local TV station, established in 2003 as an independent company by the Community Media Association (CMA), and is based in the city centre of Sheffield, England. The radio has been broadcasting on 93.2 FM since 2007.

== History ==
Sheffield Live! started operating a live streaming service on an annual restricted service licence in 2000. In 2002, Sheffield Live! was broadcasting regularly for four days a week on the Internet.

Station owner Commedia Sheffield first applied for a community broadcasting licence in November 2004.

The service started broadcasting on the frequency 93.2 FM on 29 October 2007 with the studio based at 6 Paternoster Row, Sheffield, in the former National Centre for Popular Music. Prior to this, the last time a new radio service launched in Sheffield was Hallam FM in October 1974. Sheffield Live! was launched to provide original programming by local people of all ages, backgrounds, and abilities and was originally planned to broadcast for a minimum of five years, dependent on its success in the community.

In 2009, the station relocated from the Hallam University-owned buildings to a private office across the road at The Workstation above the Showroom Cinema.

Full-time over-the-air broadcasting started at 7 am with The Breakfast Show, presented by Lloyd Samuels and Charles Clarke, featuring interviews with Nick Clegg MP, local choral group Sosa Xa!, and organisers of the three-day Dignity Not Detention march from Sheffield to Doncaster that took place on the same weekend.

== Transmission ==
Sheffield Live! uses a transmitter at Crosspool shared by other local radio stations provided by Bauer Radio and the BBC, allowing coverage as far as Rotherham, Doncaster, Barnsley, and Chesterfield.

The station currently broadcasts from studios located at 15 Paternoster Row in central Sheffield, above the Showroom Cinema accommodated in offices and training suites owned by Commedia Sheffield.

== Projects and activities ==
Sheffield Live! has been involved with many projects in the local community:

- Sheffield Live! helps organize events throughout the Sheffield area; for example, it has worked in partnership with Biggafish, a youth organization based in London devoted to the education of young people through music.
- Sheffield Live! creates education, employment, and training opportunities in the local area. For example, in 2009, the station ran a media training course, called "Future: proof", designed to give unemployed adults the skills they need to succeed in a career in media.
- Sheffield Live! advertises and promotes local businesses, organisations, and events. It also actively promotes itself, through its social networking sites and promotional days.

== Television ==
Sheffield Live!'s television began broadcasting on Tuesday 23 September 2014 at 6 pm and broadcasts every night from 6 pm to 1 am.

Sheffield Live!'s television output included Sheffield Live! News, Sheffield Live! Mix, Talking Sheffield, What's On, Walks Around Britain, Grassroots, Sharks Basketball, Sateen Daqiqi be al Arabi, Nice Out Innit? The Bassment, After the Bell, Sabrang, Da Beat Down, Up North and The Who What Where Show.

In April 2025, the licence to run the television station was transferred to That's TV, taking their number of local television licences to 17.

== See also ==
- Community radio in the United Kingdom
- Sheffield
- List of television stations in the United Kingdom
- Local television in the United Kingdom
