= That's Swansea Bay =

- Country: United Kingdom
- Broadcast area: Swansea, Neath Port Talbot and South Carmarthenshire

Programming
- Picture format: 576i (16:9 SDTV)

Ownership
- Owner: That's Media

History
- Launched: 12 July 2016

Availability

Terrestrial
- Freeview: Channel 8

That's Swansea Bay is a British local television station which broadcasts to Swansea, Neath Port Talbot and southern parts of Carmarthenshire via the Kilvey Hill transmitting station. The station went on air in July 2016 making it the second local television station in Wales after Made in Cardiff. Bay TV Swansea is based near the University of Wales Trinity Saint David's primary campus in Swansea. It was the 21st local television channel to be launched in the United Kingdom. The channel provides news, sport and entertainment programming to viewers on all major television platforms and provides some of its output without charge to the BBC. Bay TV Swansea was awarded its broadcasting licence from the Office of Communications (Ofcom) in January 2014. Programmes include shared series with other local TV channels and the syndicated series Walks Around Britain.
