= List of South African composers =

This is a list of South African composers, arranged in alphabetical order.

== B ==
- Michael Blake (born 1951), experimental music composer and Honorary Professor at Stellenbosch University
- Jürgen Bräuninger

== C ==
- Mira Calix, experimental composer
- Hannes Coetzee (born 1944), guitarist and composer
- Andrew Cruickshank (born 1973)

== D ==
- Johnny Dyani

== E ==
- David Earl (born 1951), Classical music composer and concert pianist

== F ==
- Robert Fokkens

== G ==
- Stanley Glasser (born 1926), Modern Classical music composer
- Stefans Grové

== H ==
- Paul Hanmer
- Paul Hepker
- Hendrik Hofmeyr (born 1957), Classical music composer
- David Hönigsberg (1959–2005), Classical music composer

== I ==
- Abdullah Ibrahim

== J ==
- Trevor Jones (born 1949), Classical music orchestral music score composer
- John Joubert (born 1927), Classical music composer
- Christo Jankowitz (born 1977), Classical music composer

== K ==
- Magogo kaDinuzulu, composer of Zulu classical music
- Peter Klatzow, composer, pianist and Professor Emeritus at University of Cape Town
- David Kramer (born 1951), composer, singer, songwriter, playwright and director
- Andile Khumalo (born 1978), composer, lecturer of music at University of Witwatersrand
- Mzilikazi Khumalo (1932–2021), choral composer, professor emeritus of African languages.
- David Kosviner (born 1957)

== L ==
- Solomon Linda (1909–1962), Zulu musician, singer and composer
- Clare Loveday

== M ==
- B Major
- Stephanus Le Roux Marais
- Todd Matshikiza (1921–1968), jazz pianist, composer and journalist
- Lebo Morake (born 1964), movie Soundtrack composer
- Vusi Mahlasela
- Hugh Masekela
- Michael Mosoeu Moerane (1904–1980), choral music composer

== N ==
- Bongani Ndodana-Breen

== P ==
- Taliep Petersen (1950–2006), singer, composer and director

== R ==
- Trevor Rabin (born 1954), contemporary movie soundtrack composer
- Thomas Rajna (1928–2021), modern classical music composer
- Priaulx Rainier (1903–1986)
- Michael Rosenzweig (composer) (born 1951), modern classical music composer
- Surendran Reddy (1962–2010), clazz composer

== S ==
- Hilton Schilder (born 1959) pianist
- Warrick Sony (born 1958), musician, record producer, composer
- Joseph Shabalala (born 1941), composer and founder of Ladysmith Black Mambazo
- Enoch Sontonga (1873–1905), composer of Nkosi Sikelel' iAfrika

== T ==
- Hannes Taljaard (born 1971), classical music composer
- Benjamin Tyamzashe (born 1890), Xhosa music composer

== U ==
- Ernst Ueckermann (born 1954), composer and pianist

== V ==
- Niel van der Watt (born 1962), modern choral and classical music composer
- Arnold van Wyk (1916–1983)
- Kevin Volans (born 1949), composer with the post-minimalist movement
- Dimitri Voudouris (born 1961), electro-acoustic new music composer
- Andre van Rensburg Avant Garde composer, guitarist and shakuhachi player.

== W ==
- Pierre-Henri Wicomb (born 1976), contemporary classical, film and theatre composer

== Z ==
- Jeanne Zaidel-Rudolph (born 1948), composer, pianist and teacher
- Zonke Dikana (born 1979), composer, arranger, producer and vocalist
