= NewMusicSA =

NewMusicSA is a non-profit arts advocacy organisation that promotes the creation, performance, and enjoyment of South African new music. Founded in 1999 and operating formally since 2003, NewMusicSA is the South African section (and current only African section) of the International Society for Contemporary Music (ISCM).

== Nature and Purpose ==
NewMusicSA aims to:

- Support the creation and performance of new music by South Africa-based composers and performers of all stylistic and cultural backgrounds.
- Promote, exchange ideas and practices between composers, performers, curators, researchers and writers, both nationally, and internationally.
- Empower and connects the South Africa-based music makers, organizations, and audiences by providing opportunities and fostering new connections through our programs, deepening knowledge through our annual Bulletin, and working as an advocate for the field.
- Increases awareness, acceptance, and appreciation of contemporary South African music.

== Formation ==
At the ISCM General Assembly On 10 May 1999 held in Bucharest (Romania), South African composer Michael Blake made a successful bid for South Africa's re-entry into the ISCM after an absence of nearly four decades. He was President of NewMusicSA and Artistic Director of the New Music Indaba Festival between 2000 and 2006.

== Activities ==
=== New Music Indaba ===
Since 2000, the organisation has held an annual festival, the New Music Indaba, which showcases contemporary South African music performed by musicians based both within the country and abroad. Indaba means "conference" in isiZulu. A central part of the festival are the 'Growing Composers' workshops, which provide the opportunity for emerging composers to work with established musicians and composers in a supportive environment.

From 2000 to 2006, the New Music Indaba was held as part of the National Arts Festival in Makhanda (Eastern Cape). The 2000 edition had Kevin Volans as a composer in residence. One of the highlights was the world premiere of Kevin Volans "One Day Fine" by award-winning choir Joy of Africa conducted by Makhaya Mjana in the Makhanda Cathedral. The 2001 edition celebrated Stanley Glasser's 75th birthday, and invited him to be a composer in residence along with Phelelani Mnomiya. The 2003 edition included the Electronic Music Gallery, curated by Cobi van Tonder and assisted by Dimitri Voudouris.

The 2006 edition was themed under the Mozart anniversary, "Re-Imagining Mozart". Performers included Ulrich Suesse and the Stockholm Saxophone Quartet (Sweden), Trio Rothko (Ireland), Ensemble Acrobat (Austria), Steamboat Switzerland, pianist Daan Vandewalle (Belgium), violinist Yasutaka Hemmi (Japan), and from South Africa The Kerimov Trio, Johannesburg Philharmonic Orchestra (JPO) Wind Ensemble with Jill Richards, Benjamin Fourie (playing the complete Vingt Regards by Messiaen), Aryan Kaganof, piano duet ensemble Amadou (featuring Nishlyn Ramanna and Michael Blake), and the Gauteng Choristers, playing works from Clare Loveday, Jürgen Bräuninger, Carlo Mombelli, Paul Hanmer, Kevin Volans, Luciano Berio, Toshio Hosokawa, Helmut Lachenmann, David Young, Brian Ferneyhough, Cornelius Cardew and Dimitri Shostakovich.

The 2007 edition (Tshwane, Gauteng) was hosted by the University of South Africa (UNISA). The program included the Schubert Ensemble (UK) playing works by Judith Weir and Joseph Abe, Jill Richards playing works by Stefans Grové on his 85th birthday, Marc Duby and the Minimal Thing Ensemble, Paul Hanmer, Robert Maxym, Aryan Kaganof and Michael Blake, The Collision Project (Gerhard Marx and Clare Loveday) and Magda de Vries.

The 2008 edition (Tshwane, Gauteng) was hosted by the University of South Africa (UNISA) and included the performance of Fiona Tozer´s Multiple Exposure for marimba quartet (with Magda de Vries, Ilse Minnie, Cobie van Wyk and Bryan Clarke). The 2009 edition (Tshwane, Gauteng) was hosted by the University of South Africa (UNISA).

The 2011 edition (Johannesburg, Gauteng) took place in the area of Maboneng and was curated by Cameron Harris. French-Canadian duo Veronique Mathieu (violin) and Sophie Patey (piano) performed Irreconcilable Truths by Robert Fokkens and music by Lutoslawski, Carter, Donatoni and others. Swiss musicians Roland Dahinden and Hildegard Kleeb played a trio improvised concert with Lukas Ligeti. There was a large improvised paying homage to Anthony Braxton.

The 2013 edition (Durban, KwaZulu-Natal) was curated by Fiona Tozer and was hosted by the University of KwaZulu-Natal. Themed ‘The Riot of Spring’, performances and workshops were presented by the South African New Music Ensemble with Géza Kayser (violin), Marguerite Spies (cello), Brydon Bolton (double bass), Bonle Lecoge-Zulu (flute), Morné van Heerden (clarinet), Jill Richards (piano) and Frank Mallows (percussion) conducted by Gerben Grooten. It also teamed up with the North West University New Music Ensemble to give a performance of Terry Riley’s iconic work In C. The festival also hosted the KwaZulu-Natal Philharmonic Orchestra’s Cadet Ensemble, new music groups DuoI Two (Magda de Vries and Frank Mallows, percussion) and Into, with Brydon Bolton (Double Bass), Frank Mallows (Percussion) and Zara-Moon Arthur (visuals). It featured works by resident composer Clare Loveday (including "Hoar Frost for Marimba and Vibraphone" and "Fever Tree" for the whole ensemble), Peter Klatzow, Hendrik Hofmeyr, Yogin Sullaphen, Kevin Volans, David Kosviner, Robert Fokkens and Martin Watt.

The 2015 edition (Bloemfontein, Free State) was curated by Douglas Scott and co-curated by Sifisokuhle Jiba Xulu, with assistance by Marius Coetzee. Hosted by the University of the Free State, it included performances by Ji Hye Jung, the South African New Music Ensemble conducted by Robert Fokkens, Odeion School of Music Camerata conducted by Xavier Cloete, Odeion Vocal Consort, and an improvised set by Mpho Molikeng, Kathleen Tagg and Lukas Ligeti. Works included the South African premiere of Lukas Ligeti´s "Thinking Songs", "Concerto for Double Bass" by Pierre-Henri Wicomb, and "Friday Nights at 6" by Diale Mabitsela. A workshop for young children was led by German composer Charlotte Seither.

The 2017 edition (Tshwane, Gauteng) was curated by Douglas Scott. It included an adaptation of Frederic Rzewski "De Profundis" for speaking pianist (1994) performed by Joanna Wicherek, a piano recital by Benjamin Fourie, a music film programme, an art exhibition by Tshidzo, and a music making workshop for kids and parents.

The 2018 edition (Port Elizabeth, Eastern Cape) was hosted by the Nelson Mandela University and curated by Malcolm De~~a~~dman. It included performances by Elmarie van der Vyver and Mathilda Hornsveld (works by Niel van der Watt, Franco Prinsloo and Pieter Bezuidenhout), Dominic Daula (works by James May, Hubert du Plessis, Hendrik Hofmeyr, Casey Chiang, Malcolm Dedman and Arnold van Wyk), a chamber concert (‘In Honour of Madiba’ and ‘The Passing of an Icon’ by Malcolm Dedman), and pieces by John Simon, solos by Douglas Scott and Lise Morrison, a new work by Paul Richard, a brass quartet by Hendrik van Blerk and a concert/workshop by composition students of the University.

The 2019 edition (Tshwane, Gauteng) was hosted by the University of South Africa (UNISA) and curated by Mark Duby, assisted by Lukas Ligeti and Ignacio Priego. It featured as Artist in Residence the trio consisting of Jill Richards (piano), Waldo Alexander (violin) and Morné van Heerden (clarinet); Luc Houtkamp (saxophone, electronics) and Edwin Balzan (electronics) as Visiting Artists; and percussionists Sazi Dlamini and Lukas Ligeti as Guest Performers. The programme included a celebration concert for Kevin Volans 70th birthday and a jam concert in Mamelodi hosted by the Philip Tabane Foundation featuring Thabang Tabane (vocals & drums), Azah (vocals), Naftali (vocals and harmonica), Sakhile Thwala (bass guitar), Mpho Tshwale (keys), Dennis Magagula (djembe drums) and Jonathan Crossley (guitar).

The 2020 edition was cancelled due to Covid-19.

The 2021 edition was rebranded as Digital Indaba, held in a hybrid format (physical and online) and spread throughout the calendar year. It included commissions of new works to Dimitri Voudouris, Hannes Taljaard and Neo Muyanga, premiered in concerts in Johannesburg featuring Yonela Mnana (piano), Waldo Alexander (violin), Tiisetso Mashishi (viola), Magda de Vries (percussion) and Morné van Heerden (clarinet), and in Cape Town featuring Lungiswa Plaatjies (voice), Matthijs van Dijk (violin), Graham du Plessis (cello) and David Lubbe (piano). It also included the online audiovisual series "Stories We Told Ourselves", curated by Daniel Hutchinson, and a jam concert in Mamelodi hosted by the Philip Tabane Foundation featuring Naftali (vocals and harmonica), Dennis Magagula (djembe drums), Cara Stacey (mbira), Keenan Ahrends (guitar), Camron Andrews (saxophone), Aubrey Seapose (guitar), Dennis Magagula (percussion), Paul Ndlovu (saxophone and flute), Elway Masango (bass), Mpho Tshwale (keyboard) and Liza Miro (vocalist).

=== Unyazi Electronic Music Festival ===
Unyazi Electronic Music Festival
- Genre: Electronic music
- Locations: Johannesburg and Durban

NewMusicSA also runs the Unyazi Electronic Music Festival, which alternates with the New Music Indaba on an annual basis. Unyazi means "lightning" in isiZulu.

The first Unyazi (Johannesburg, Gauteng) was hosted by the University of the Witwatersrand in 2005. The artistic curator was Dimitri Voudouris, while the parallel conference programme was curated by Jürgen Bräuninger. The programme included works and performances by Pauline Oliveros, Halim El-Dabh, Louis Moholo Moholo improvising with George Lewis, Francisco López, Luc Houtkamp POW ensemble, Lukas Ligeti, and many South African musicians and electronic music composers including Bräuninger, Voudouris, Pops Mohamed, Warrick Sony (Kalahari Surfers), James Webb, Zim Ngqawana, Joao Orecchia, Brendon Bussy and Theo Herbst.

The second Unyazi (Cape Town and Stellenbosch, Western Cape, and Johannesburg, Gauteng) was curated by James Webb and held in 2008. Dubbed ‘Fear of the known’, it featured 35 artists performing in five concerts, with 16 presenting workshops and lectures. International artists included the Luc Houtkamp POW Ensemble (Netherlands), Eric LaCasa and Jako Maron with Automat (France), Lawrence English and Philip Samartzis (Australia), Jason Kahn and Sudden Infant (China), Patrick Bebelaar, Marc Behrens, Mark Schreiber, Ulrich Süße and Asmus Tietchens (Germany), Brandon LaBelle (USA). South African artists included the Kemus Ensemble (performing Stockhausen’s Mikrophonie I), Ensemble Je Ne Comprends Pas (performing new compositions by young South African composers Brydon Bolton, Jan-Hendrik Harley, John Pringle and Pierre-Henri Wicomb), Richard Kapp, Warrick Sony (Kalahari Surfers) and James Webb.

In 2010 NewMusicSA presented a smaller electronic music festival, eMusic Indaba in Durban (KwaZulu-Natal), hosted by the University of KwaZulu-Natal. Curated by Jürgen Bräuninger and Fiona Tozer with assistance from Mandy Wilken, it included two evenings of electro-acoustic music and three days of workshops for young South African composers and performers. The programme included two new commissions to Angie Mullins and Daniel Hutchinson, and works by Nicolas Collins performed by Petra Ronner, Max E. Keller, Jürgen Bräuninger, Rüdiger Meyer, Ulrich Süße, Dimitri Voudouris, Pierre-Henri Wicomb, Luc Houtkamp POW ensemble and Sazi Dlamini.

The third Unyazi (Durban, Kwazulu-Natal) was curated in 2012 by Jürgen Bräuninger, with support by Fiona Tozer and Cameron Harris. Themed "Lightning Strikes Thrice", it was hosted by the University of KwaZulu-Natal. It included performances by American composer Carl Stone, Nina Mkhize, Bhekizenzo Cele, Thulasizwe Shozi, Brush ‘Emmanuel’ Dlamini violinist Darragh Morgan, multinational improvisation group Die Schrauber (Mario de Vega, Joker Nies and Hans Tammen), Lukas Ligeti, João Orecchia, Warrick Sony (Kalahari Surfers) and Daniel Hutchinson. Works included Nothing is Real (Strawberry Fields Forever) by Alvin Lucier (performed by Jill Richards on piano and teapot with Shaughn Macrae on electronics) and Morton Subotnick’s The other piano.

The fourth Unyazi was held in Johannesburg in 2014, hosted by the University of the Witwatersrand. Co-curated by Cameron Harris and Carl Stone, a special focus on interaction between South Africa and Japan/the Pacific Rim through a collaboration with another ISCM section (the Japan Society for Contemporary Music). Partnerships were established with the Fakugesi Digital Africa Festival, the A MAZE Digital Arts Festival and the annual South African Society of Research in Music (SASRIM) conference. The programme included performances by the South African New Music Ensemble (premiering the electronic piece Stroompie by Maxim Starcke, commissioned by NMSA), Kazuhisa Uchihashi, Alfred 23 Harth, Jonathan Crosley and Jonno Sweetman. Jill Richards and João Orecchia collaborated with video artist Jurgen Meekel and Japanese composer Tomoko Momiyama to create a new multi‐media work for the festival entitled "When Humans Go Extinct". Other performances included "QOB’UQALO" for uqalo, voice and electronic sound by Jürgen Bräuninger and Sazi Dlamini and an improvised electronic work for dancer, vibraphone and computer by Brydon Bolton, Frank Mallows and Thabo Rapoo.

The fifth Unyazi was held in 2016 in Cape Town (Western Cape), hosted by the University of Cape Town. Curated by William Fourie and Theo Herbst with assistance from Meryl van Noie and Miles Warrington, the theme was "Infrastructures". It included works by Arnold van Wyk, Cameron Harris, Jürgen Bräuninger, Ulrich Süsse, Sazi Dlamini, Neo Muyanga, Roché van TIddens, Miles Warrington, Angie Mullins, Amy Luyendijk, Meryl van Noie, João Orecchia, Njabulo Phungula, Lise Morrison, Dimitri Voudouris, Thokozani Mhlambi, Felicity Mdhluli, Maxim Starcke, Pierre-Henri Wicomb, Cameron Harris, Georg Friedrich Haas, Samora Ntsebeza and Kevin Volans. Performers included Marguerite Spies, Frank Mallows, Philisa Sibeko, Cindy Manciya, Phandulwazi Maseti, Phumzile Theo Magongoma, Anna James, Sarah Evans, Visser Liebenberg, Ncebakazi Mnukwana, Cara Stacey, Petrus de Beer, Waldo Alexander, Lieva Starker, Petrus de Beer, Marguerite Spies, Jill Richards, Brydon Bolton, Coila Enderstein and Reza Khota.

=== ISCM World New Music Days Festival ===
An important aspect of the organisation's role is to convene an annual jury to select South African works that will be considered for performance at the ISCM World Music Days festival. Since 2000 NewMusicSA has been represented at almost every edition of the World Music Days. South Africa-based composers whose works have been selected for performance at the World Music Days Festival by the ISCM international jury in recent years are:

- Rituals for Forgotten Faces by Bongani Ndodana-Breen (Luxembourg, 2000)
- Cicada by Kevin Volans (Yokohama, 2001)
- Responsorium by Hans Huyssen (Hong Kong, 2002)
- Utlwang Lefoko La Morena by Mokale Koapeng (Slovenia, 2003)
- Yinkosi Yeziziba by Jürgen Bräuninger and Sazi Dlamini (Switzerland, 2004)
- Incantesimo by Hendrik Hofmeyr (Zagreb, 2005)
- Coexistenz by Cobi van Tonder (Stuttgart, 2006)
- Five Glimpses by Stefans Grové (Hong Kong, 2007)
- The Collision Project by Clare Loveday (Lithuania, 2008) - not performed
- An Eventful Morning Near East London by Robert Fokkens (Sweden, 2009)
- Items 1, 2, 3 by Braam du Toit (Australia, 2010); also independent submission Duodectet 1 & II by Clare Loveday
- Angie Mullins (Croatia, 2011)
- Tombeau de Moerane by Michael Blake (Slovenia, 2015)
- Praying Mantis III for brass quintet by Roché van Tiddens (South Korea, 2016)
- Unknown (Canada, 2017)
- Coquette – Scena for solo flute by John Simon (China, 2018)
- Pula, Pula! for mixed choir by Franco Prinsloo (Estonia, 2019)
- Lukas Ligeti (New Zealand, 2020) - festival postponed
- Trio for Piano, Violin and Cello by Jeanne Zaidel-Rudolph (China, 2021) - festival cancelled
- Lukas Ligeti (New Zealand, 2022)

=== Other projects ===
The Bow Project commissioned 26 new pieces for string quartet based on the uhadi bow music of Nofinishi Dywili. It was launched at the New Music Indaba in 2002, and new works premiered at subsequent festivals. A South African tour in 2009 was followed by a double album of studio recordings by the Nightingale String Quartet of Denmark and historic field recordings of uhadi songs by Dywili, released in 2010. Each of the twelve string quartets, by a different composer, is based on a song by Dywili.

In 2013 NewMusicSA founded the South African New Music Ensemble (SANME), a chamber ensemble of variable instrumentation formulated with the purpose of bringing together performers and composers of new music in South Africa. The ensemble played its debut performance at the 2013 New Music Indaba at the University of KwaZulu-Natal Howard College Campus. In the same year NewMusicSA issued its first commissions in a call for scores for two works to be played by the ensemble. The call was for one entirely instrumental/acoustic work and one mixed electronic/acoustic work. The acoustic commission was awarded to Pierre-Henri Wicomb. The electronic/acoustic commission was awarded to Maxim Starcke. The SANME was discontinued in 2015.

The Soundings series presented:

- In 2015 an event featuring Marietjie Pauw (flute) and Garth Erasmus (Khoisan instruments), and two commissions by Paul Hamner (‘... ma Wanne Kommie Druiwe?’) and by Aryan Kaganof (a film response to the curated event including three separate films).
- In 2016 a sound installation by Memory Biwa and Robert Machiri that acted as critical interface between mbira sound, history, memory and archives entitled: ‘Listening to a listening at Pungwe Nights’.

In 2021 Daniel Hutchinson curated the online audiovisual series "Stories We Told Ourselves", featuring 3 filmed improvisations by Reza Khota, Nicholas Aphane and Zorada Temming, and 3 mixed media works by Eugene Skeef, Kyla-Rose Smith and Garth Erasmus.

== Partnerships and Funding ==
Since its foundation, NewMusicSA has worked with a number of other South African and international music and cultural organisations, such as multiple Universities, the UNISA Music Foundation and the South African National Youth Orchestra to provide opportunities for emerging South African composers. In 2008 the archive of NewMusicSA, which includes much documentary information and numerous unique music scores by South African composers was donated to the Documentation Centre for Music (DOMUS) at the University of Stellenbosch (Western Cape). NewMusicSA has collaborated with the Visby International Composers Centre (VICC) in Sweden for residencies of South African composers.

Funding organisations of NewMusicSA have included the National Lotteries Commission, the Department of Arts and Culture, the National Arts Council, the Southern African Music Rights Organisation (SAMRO), Business & Arts South Africa (BASA), The Arts & Culture Trust-Nedbank, Goethe Institut, Pro Helvetia, the Embassy of Austria, the Embassy of the Kingdom of the Netherlands, the School of Arts Institute of Chicago, the Rupert Foundation, the Distell Foundation, and the Oppenheimer Memorial Trust.

== Governance ==
The board members as of 2020 are: Diale Mabitsela (Chair), David Lephoto (Treasurer), Lukas Ligeti (Liaison), Adeyemi Oladiran, Nonkululeko Phiri and Jeanne Zaidel-Rudolph (Non-exec/advisor).

Past Presidents were Michael Blake, Mokale Koapeng and Chris Walton. Past Chairs were: Cameron Harris, Angie Mullins, William Fourie, Chris Jeffery, Douglas Scott, Sifisokuhle Jiba Zulu, Malcolm Dedman and Robert Fokkens.

== See also ==
- List of electronic music festivals

== Sources ==
- Blake, M. 2007. 'South African Composers on the World Stage: The ISCM in South Africa’ in Fontes Artis Musicae 54/3 July–September 2007. 359–73.
- Heuvelmans, H. 2000. ‘Minutes of the ISCM General Assembly 1999 in Bucharest’ in World New Music. 10. September 2001.
