= Andi Spicer =

English composer (1959–2020)

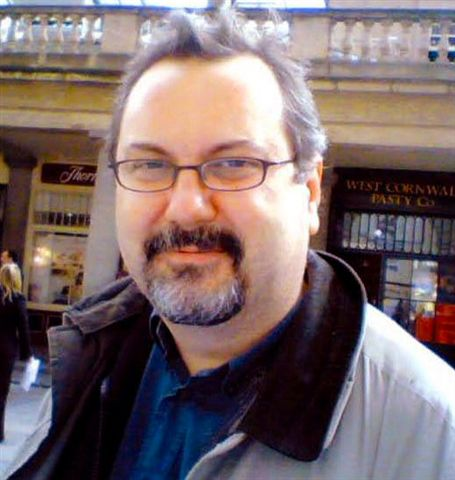
Andi Spicer in London, circa 2004

Andrew John Preston "Andi" Spicer (1959 – 30 April 2020) was an English electroacoustic classical music composer who used electronics (see Electronic Music) in his compositions.

The composer was also a writer and journalist. He has contributed to The Wall Street Journal and The Gramophone as a reviewer, and has written for many international newspapers, magazines and news agencies, including Dow Jones Newswires, The Associated Press, The Independent, The Financial Times and The Observer. His music is published by Edition Tre Fontane in Münster, Germany.

== History and influences ==
Spicer was born in Birmingham, England.

He studied economics at Aston University in Birmingham and pursued a career in journalism, while composing and performing free form improvised music (see free improvisation). He lived in Johannesburg, South Africa between 1996 and 2003, working as a foreign correspondent for major US and British newspapers, after which he moved back to England. He lived in Brighton from 2013, and was a member of the New Music Brighton and London Forum collectives of composers in the UK. His compositions have been featured at the Brighton Festival, Soundwaves Festival, Huddersfield Contemporary Music Festival, Goldsmiths College Pure Gold Festival, Royal College of Music in London, London COMA Summer School, Bille en Tête Festival (Musique en Roue Libre) in Arras, France, and at the All Ears Contemporary Music Festival in London, as well as at the Grahamstown Festival in South Africa and performed elsewhere in France, Italy, Sweden, Austria, Mexico and the US.

He was largely self-taught, although he took private lessons in composition and music theory with South African composer Martin Watt at the University of the Witwatersrand and composition workshops with British composer Michael Finnissy. His music uses improvisation, graphic notation, electronics (see electronic art music) and emphasises surface textures, but is also influenced by southern African and Asian world music.

He is associated with the Gallery III group of artists, musicians and multi-media artists in Johannesburg, South Africa, which included artist and musician James de Villiers and Beat poet Sinclair Beiles. Spicer is among a new generation of composers in post-apartheid South Africa. Other examples are Bongani Ndodana-Breen, Dimitri Voudouris, Jürgen Bräuninger, Cobi van Tonder, Hannes Taljaard, Michael Blake, Robert Fokkens and Spicer's teacher Martin Watt.

In 2019, he moved to Llandysul, Wales, and died there a year later from cancer.

== Compositions ==
In Anglo Boer War (1999) he explored cluster note and microtonal techniques. The piece is a strident anti-war composition written for the hundredth anniversary of the Anglo Boer War (see Second Boer War) and was a collaboration with the artist James de Villiers.

His 63 Moons (2003) composition was influenced by the Javanese gamelan music, Shona mbira music and contemporary minimalist composers.

Click Language (2004) continued Spicer's African themes and uses sampled words from southern African click languages such as Xhosa (see Xhosa language), Zulu (see Zulu language) and Khoisan languages as a sound patina for four percussionists, comprising vibraphone, marimba, waterphone and other hand-held instruments. Baobab (2003) employs polyrhythms inspired by southern African drumming and features the vibraphone and marimba. There is a version of Baobab for harpsichord (2006), written for Polish harpsichordist Kasia Tomczak-Feltrin, and an extended version for harpsichordist Jane Chapman. He was writing an opera for video based on Arno Schmidt's novel The Egghead Republic (Die Gelehrtenrepublik).

Recent works explored live electronics and acoustic instrument blends, including MIDI instruments. Since the beginning of 2006, he worked closely with French woodwind and electronic music soloist and professor of woodwind at the London Royal College of Music, Julien Feltrin. Spicer has also worked with London-based percussion ensemble Brake Drum Assembly. He formed the ensemble Caos Harmonia to perform his music in 1997 and has also performed with London-based new music group, The Kluster Ensemble.

== Film and video ==
Austrian video artist Peter Gold produced a short film for three movements of Anglo Boer War for the 2006 All Ears Contemporary Music Festival in London. Antarctica (1995–1996) is an early work for electronics written for an unreleased video of Antarctic landscapes.

== Art installations ==
Spicer collaborated with performance artist Paolo Giudici in the installation Thesis at the Hockney Gallery at the Royal College of Art in London in 2006. Painter/multimedia artist James de Villiers worked with Spicer in The Architecture of Air, which toured the US, Mexico and South Africa in 2001–2003 with Transformations, an exhibition of South African art. Inside, Outside (2001) is an electronic piece for a James de Villiers' installation of the same title shown at the Carfax in Johannesburg.

== Selected works ==
- Antarctica (1995–96) – for electronics, video
- Virtually Ambient Shostakovich (1997) – for voices, sampler and keyboards
- Anglo Boer War (1999) – for voices, strings and electronic manipulation
- String Quartet Four (2000) – for string quartet
- Sequenzas (2000) – for piano
- Auto da Fe' (2002) – for orchestra
- In Memoriam Valdemar Rodriquez (2002) – for orchestra
- 63 Moons (2003) – variations for world music instruments, percussion and synthesizers
- Bigga Digga (2004) – for voices
- Shakespeare Whispers (2004) – for voices
- Baobab (2004) – for percussion quartet
- Click Language' (2005) – for percussion quartet and electronics
- pHyTHoN (2005) – for French horn & piano
- Four Pieces (2005) – for brass quintet
- Bird (2006) – for vibraphone and electronics
- Euclid Alone (2006) – for Paetzold Great Bass, tenor recorders & electronics, French horn and percussion quartet
- The Anthropic Principle (2006) – for midi wind controller and laptop
- Polonnaruwa (2006) – for laptop electronics
- Baobab (2004) – revised for harpsichord (2006)
- Haut Voltage (2006) – improvisation for midi wind controller, clarinet and laptop electronics
- Tiktaalik (2006) – for any instrument
- The Giraffe Sleeper (2007) – for chamber orchestra, piano and laptop electronics
- Cold, Cold (2007) – for laptop electronics and manipulated voice, words by Chris Edwards
- For Dimitri Voudouris (2007) – for laptop electronics, electronically manipulated alto saxophone and French horn
- The Antikythera Mechanism (2008) – for natural horn & electronics
- Nazca (2008) – for chamber orchestra & laptop electronics
- Hydrogen (2008) – for flute & laptop electronics
- A Scent of Knife Blossom (2009) – for solo cello
- For James de Villiers (2009) – for laptop electronics
- Archaeopteryx (2010) – for low recorder quartet and electronics
- The Book of Graphic Scores (2010) – for any instrument
- Kailasanatha' (2012) – for laptops, violin, alto sax and electric guitar electronics (collaboration with Paul Sharma)
- Goodbye (2012) – for piano & electronics (in memory of Chris Edwards)
- Messestadt West (2014) – for electric guitar and digital looper
- Crow (2014) – for laptop electronics
- SS 14a' (2014) – for laptop electronics
