= Wicomb =

Wicomb is a surname occurring in South Africa. Notable people with the surname include:

- Pierre-Henri Wicomb (fl. 2006), South African composer of contemporary music
- Zoë Wicomb (1948–2025), South African author and academic
