= Surendran Reddy =

South African composer and pianist

Background information
- Born: 9 March 1962; Durban, South Africa
- Died: 22 January 2010 (aged 47) Konstanz, Germany
- Occupations: composer, artist
- Instrument: piano
- Years active: 1975–2010
- Website: www.surendran-reddy.com

Surendran Reddy (9 March 1962 – 22 January 2010) was a South African composer and pianist.

After his studies at the Royal College of Music and King's College in London he had a highly successful international career as a classical and jazz pianist. He invented his own new musical style called "clazz" in which he fuses classical, jazz, South African mbaqanga and other world music elements. His compositions, which have been performed all over the world, include orchestral and chamber music as well as solo instrumental and vocal works.

== Biography ==
Surendran Reddy was born in Durban, South Africa, on 9 March 1962. He grew up in Zimbabwe where he started his musical career at an early age. He studied piano at the Rhodesian Academy of Music in Bulawayo and already did concert tours as a classical pianist at the age of 13. At 15 he won a scholarship which took him to the Royal College of Music in London where he studied from 1977 to 1981 with inter alia Bernard Roberts and Yonty Solomon (piano), George Malcolm (harpsichord), Virginia Pleasants (forte piano), Anthony Milner (Harmony and counterpoint). From 1981 to 1982 he studied musicology at King's College, London University with inter alia Brian Trowell, Reinhard Strohm, Pierluigi Petrobelli and Thomas Walker. He graduated at the age of 19 having won numerous awards. While still a student he had opportunities to perform at London's Wigmore Hall, St Martin-in-the-Fields and Queen Elizabeth Hall. After returning to South Africa he lectured at the University of Durban-Westville, joined NAPAC as resident pianist and then became Head of the Music Department at FUBA Academy of Music in Johannesburg. He played with all the major orchestras in South Africa and got to work with international artists such as Kiri Te Kanawa, and the Harlem Dance Company amongst others. He has also played with numerous South African stars such as Sibongile Khumalo, Allen Kwela, André van Eeden and Johnny Fourie.

As a composer he has often been commissioned to compose pieces for national and international competitions. His works have been performed in Russia, Canada, the States and Germany as well as other countries. Reid Anderson, artistic director of the Stuttgart Ballet and the world's foremost exponent of John Cranko's ballets choreographed his "Four Romantic Piano Pieces" which became a hit of the Alberta Ballet. In 1996 Southern African Music Rights Organisation SAMRO commissioned Surendran together with six other composers each to write a movement of a larger oratorio dealing with issues arising out of the Human Right's Treaty and intended as a gift from South Africa to the Olympic Games held at Atlanta in that year. His movement is entitled "Masakane" (Let Us Build Together) and the orchestral version of the piece was premiered on 23 March 2000 by the KwaZulu-Natal Philharmonic Orchestra in Durban. His piece "Toccata for John Roos" was performed at the 11th Unisa International Piano Competition in Pretoria in 2008.

Surendran has also written jingles for Radio and TV and worked as musical director for numerous shows. He has recorded extensively for the SABC and worked on a number of albums included his two solo CDs "Reddy, Steady, Go!" and "Rough 'n Reddy". At the release of the latter CD he devised the term "clazz" to describe his own unique brand of fusion - a mixture of classical and jazz styles as well as South African mbaqanga and world music in general.

His fusion band Channel 18 – comprising himself on piano and keyboards, Bruce Cassidy on EVI (electronic valve instrument), Denis Lalouette on bass and Rob Watson on drums and featuring his own jazz compositions – has performed frequently all over South Africa. In Germany he performed at the Frankfurter Musikmesse with his duo called "Campaign for Real Time". In 2005 he toured South Africa and Germany together with tabla player Florian Schiertz performing a fusion of classical Indian tabla music and clazz.

His solo piano recitals took him a.o. to the Grahamstown Festival, South Africa and the New Music Festival, Youngstown.

Together with Michael Wiener he gave seminars on racism at various Hochschulen in Switzerland.

Apart from his work as a composer and performer, Surendran has also been a creative artist in the fields of poetry, literature and installation arts.

Surendran died on 22 January 2010 at the age of 47 in Konstanz, Germany, where he worked as a freelance composer, pianist and music lecturer.

== Partial list of works ==
=== Solo Piano ===
- Four Romantic Piano Pieces, (choreographed by Reid Andersen for Alberta Ballet, Canada)
- Four Piano Pieces
- Homage to Bach
- Suite Freedom
- Don't give a Damn Blues
- Afrojol
- Ubunene ngamandla (gentleness is strength)
- Namibia
- Go for it!, 1992
- In the fast Lane
- Friends' suite
  - daniel's dream
  - African dance for hike
  - fantasia for felix
  - now what marion
  - idyll for johan
- A touch of clazz 2:
  - forbidden wedding (for Daniel)
  - valse for marion and maurice
  - African journey (for mathias)
  - berceuse (for Marion)
  - mayibuye – an African ballade (for hike)
  - African lullaby (for leanne)
- Elevenses
- African funk for felix (piano + percussion)
- Phil-harmonie (piano / e. piano + drums)
- Ballade for florian (piano / e. piano + tablas), 2005
- Clazzical Sonata in C "Hammerclazz Sonata", 2006
- Etude pour Flore, 2006
- Etude for Philipp, 2006
- Toccata "à la mode" 4 Mol(l)ina or "Requiem for a monk", 2007
- Toccata for John Roos, 2007

=== Solo Instrumental (various instruments) ===
- Toccata for Madiba, 1997 for organ solo, SAMRO commission
- Mayibuye Suite, 2001 for organ solo, SAMRO commission
- 6 Baroque Suites for harpsichord or piano
- Game I for Lîla for clarinet, SAMRO commission

=== Chamber ===
- A la recherche de la paix et de la liberté (tenor, clarinet and piano) première 1993, Moscow
- Back to the Bass-IX for bass and piano, 2006
- Sonata F-A-I-R-P-L-A-Y for violon and piano, 2007

=== Orchestra ===
- Masakane – Let us build together, 1996, cantata for baritone, SATB choir and piano or orchestra based on the Human Rights Treaty
- Gaia – The Living Earth, cantata for soprano, baritone, SATB choir and piano or orchestra based on Chief Seathl's speech

=== Ballet ===
- Three Minutes to Midnight (ballet for electronic instruments and prepared piano)
- Dance of the Rain (ballet for electronic instruments and prepared piano)

=== Musical ===
- Dragon's Breath Adventure (children's musical), première 1994, National Arts Festival Grahamstown, South Africa
- Momo (incidental music for strings, clarinet sextet and piano)

=== Choral/Voice ===
- Masakane - Let us build together, 1996, cantata for baritone, SATB choir and piano or orchestra based on the Human Rights Treaty
- Gaia – The Living Earth, cantata for soprano, baritone, SATB choir and piano or orchestra based on Chief Seathl's speech

== Performing career ==
=== Piano Concertos with Orchestra (selection) ===
Soloist with all major orchestras in South Africa

- Shostakovich 2 (London, 1981)
- Frank Martin: Concerto for Harpsichord (Johannesburg, 1985)
- Shostakovich 1 (Cape Town, 1986)
- Ravel: „Left Hand" (Durban 1987)
- Bartok 3 (Durban, 1989)
- Beethoven 4 (Bloemfontein, 1991)
- Prokofiev 3 (Johannesburg, 1992)
- Gershwin: Concerto in F (Johannesburg, 1992)
- Mozart K466 (Kairo, 1995)
- Gershwin: Rhapsody in Blue (Stellenbosch, 1998)

=== International Concerts, Solo Jazz Recitals, Concerts with Orchestras/ Bands (selection) ===
- Sun City, South Africa, 1995 (with National Symphony Orchestra and Kiri Te Kanawa)
- Grahamstown Arts Festival, South Africa, 1991-1996 (solo jazz recital, with fusion band Channel 18)
- Gershwin Revue: With André van Eeden(1991 Observatory Theatre, Bloemfontein) Musical
- Big Band Revue: With André van Eeden, 1991 Café Noir Cabaret Café International.
- Zeltfestival Konstanz, Germany, 1996 (solo jazz recital)
- Deutsche Welle, Köln, Germany, 1996
- Concert Tour "Pops" with National Symphony Orchestra, 1996, Amann, Jordan, Cairo, Egypt
- Stadthalle, München-Germering, Germany, 1997
- Opening Kulturzentrum Konstanz, 1998 (performance of his choral work Masakane)
- Potchefstroom Arts Festival (solo jazz recital, with fusion band Channel 18), South Africa, 1998
- Oudtshoorn Arts Festival (solo jazz recital, with fusion band Channel 18), South Africa, 1998
- Aachener Kulturtage (solo jazz recital), Aachen, Germany, 1998
- "Harmonie" jazz club, Bonn, Germany, 1998
- Frankfurter Musikmesse 1996 and 1999 (with band Campaign for Real Time)
- Little Shop of Horrors (musical), Konstanz, 1998 and 1999
- Dana New Music Festival, Youngstown, USA, 1996 and 2000
- Tour South Africa 2005 with tabla player Florian Schiertz

=== Partial discography ===
- Johannesburg Pops (1990) – soloist with orchestra
- Tussen Treine (Transistor Music, 1991) – with Richard v.d. Westhuizen and Lochner de Cock
- Reddy, Steady, Go! (1994) – solo jazz piano featuring original compositions, arrangements, improvisations
- Rough' n Reddy (1996) – solo jazz piano
- April Fool's Day (2000) – as rock keyboarder in band Element 58

== Prizes and awards ==
- 1st prize Royal Overseas League International Competition, 1979, London
- Raymond Russell Prize for harpsichord 1980, Royal College of Music (RCM), London
- Hilda Andersen Deane Prize for clavichord 1982, RCM, London
- Arthur Bliss Memorial Prize for best all-round musicianship 1982, RCM, London
- 1st prize South African Broadcasting Corporation (SABC),1985, competition in both piano and harpsichord categories (the first time this had ever happened)
