= Andile Khumalo =

South African composer

Andile Khumalo (born 12 May 1978) is a South African composer and a music lecturer at the University of Witwatersrand. In 2013, he completed his Doctor of Musical Arts at Columbia University under the supervision of George Lewis. There he also studied with Fabien Levy and Tristan Murail. Prior to his DMA, Khumalo studied under Marco Stroppa at the Staatliche Hochschule für Musik und Darstellende Kunst Stuttgart (HMDKS) and with Jürgen Bräuninger at the University of KwaZulu-Natal. Khumalo's compositions are predominantly in a spectral style.

== Early life and education ==
Khumalo was born in and grew up in Umlazi, a township located south-west of Durban in the coastal province of KwaZulu-Natal. Khumalo's early music education included training at the Siyakhula community music centre. In 1998 he enrolled for a music degree at the University of KwaZulu-Natal where he studied composition with Jürgen Bräuninger, which he completed in 2001. From 2002 till 2007, Khumalo studied composition with Marco Stroppa and music theory with Matthias Herman at HMDKS. He then took up a position as a Faculty Fellow at Columbia University, completing his PhD with a dissertation on Beat Furrer's FAMA.

Khumalo was employed as a lecturer in music theory, composition and orchestration at the University of Witwatersrand in 2013. He has also been active in the Sterkfontein Composers Meeting and a tutor for the South African Society for Research in Music's new music meeting.

== Career ==
=== Notable performances ===
In 2014, Khumalo was featured in Carnegie Hall's Ubuntu Festival as part of a concert featuring a selection of new music composers. His music was also featured in the 2013 Festival d'Automne and the Cologne New Music Forum of the same year. Khumalo has been featured at festivals and competitions in South Africa as well. He was the runner-up in the 2006 SAMRO overseas scholarship competition and featured at a number of NewMusicSA's New Music Indabas, the Sterkfontein Composers Meeting, and the Grahamstown National Arts Festival.

=== Critical reception ===
Two of Khumalo's works, Shades of Words and Cry Out, have particularly gained significant critical reception. Reviewing the Festival d'Automne performance of Shades of Words, Martin Kaltenecker writes,

Andile Khumalo's Shades of words is a melodrama built upon spoken poems (sent by mail to a friend of the composer) accompanied by seven instruments which envelop the poetic fragments with subtle and often 'Sciarrinian' textures.

George Lewis has also written of the piece,

This extraordinarily compact composition performs with aplomb the bridging of the temporal gulf between words, which can generate an entire network of associations in an instant, and music, which despite its reputation for immediacy, takes its time to construct its environment. While many composers routinely report their interest in "time"–a seeming truism–the implication of Khumalo's composition goes beyond now-conventional disruptions and transgressions of disciplinary boundaries. Shades of Words transposes disciplinary contentions and struggles for meaning to a higher and more resonant register that asks us how to reconcile two experiences of time: one in remembrance, recollection, and fantasy, where indeterminacy and agency meet, and the other on a (now often virtual) page, operating in the interstices between immediacy and permanence.

While these reviews are mostly positive, Lukas Ligeti has suggested that Khumalo's music is derivative:

Andile Khumalo's Shades of Words, a setting of poetry by Alexandra Zelman-Doring, was written in the style of European post-second-Viennese- school/Darmstadt modernism. The relevance of this Eurocentric music to the cultural situation in South Africa is debatable, and newly-created music in this idiom is almost inevitably derivative. Perhaps Khumalo, now back in South Africa after many years of studies in Germany and the United States, will yet develop a South African slant to this style of music, leading to a more individual voice.

Of Cry Out, Kaltenecker writes that the piece

proved to be a virtuosic piece played mezza voce, culminating at the very end in a striking texture of strident sounds, the oboist turning to play the woodblocks in dialogue with high pizzicati from the viola and the piano.

Other critical perspectives on the composer have tended to consider his role as a non-Western composer writing in a style largely ascribed to Western composers. Chris van Rhyn, for instance, has written that while many composers in post-apartheid South Africa reverted to an accessible musical aesthetic rooted in basic tonal concepts, Khumalo tends to compose in a more abstract manner. Of this, Van Rhyn suggests that

perhaps in the case of [Khumalo], it served a young black South African composer well to not reproduce [the shift an accessible aesthetic], so as to challenge persisting notions of the African as primitive (natural, tonal) compared to the west as modern (universal, abstract). When looking at the other works by Khumalo in my possession (ISO(R) for flute, cello and piano (2004), Ossia for clarinet and cello (2010) and Schaufe(r)nster for piano (2011)), it is clear that Khumalo does not aim to always denote 'Africa' in his works.

Georg Beck suggests a similar defiance in Khumalo's music when he writes of Cry Out that

das klug und einfühlsam gebaute Ensemblestück des jungen schwarzafrikanischen Komponisten Andile Khumalo, hielt denselben konsequent [unter einer wispernden, stetig gespannten Oberfläche verborgen. Musik, die (gegen die Erwartungen unseres "postkolonialen" Bewusstseins) gerade nicht die große Geste sucht, keine schwarze Faust zeigt, die vielmehr auf einer sehr europäisch geschulten Material- und Instrumentalebene elementare Fragen eines südafrikanischen Komponisten von heute verhandelt: Wie kann das Individuum, hier die Bratsche, allen gegenläufigen Umständen im Ensemble zum Trotz, seinen Weg gehen?

[the clever and sensitive ensemble of the young Black African composer Andile Khumalo, concealed [the notion of crying out] consistently under a whispering, constantly tensioned surface. Music, which does not seek the great gesture (against the expectations of our "post-colonial" consciousness), does not show a black fist, but rather, through very European material and at an instrumental level, asks the elementary question of contemporary South African composers: How can the individual (the viola here) have its way, despite all opposing circumstances in the ensemble?]

=== Notable works ===
- Tracing Hollow traces for solo B♭ clarinet (2014)
- Human Cries (2014) – Voice and marimba.
- Schaufe[r]nster II (2014) – Piano.
- Bells Die Out (2013) – Flute, piccolo, oboe, clarinet, French horn, trumpet, trombone, piano, 2 violins, viola, cello, contrabass, marimba, wood blocks, tam-tam, bass drum, guiro.
- Shades of Words (2011) – Violin, viola, cello, flute, clarinet, piano, marimba, narrator.
- Schaufe[r]nster I (2011) – Piano.
- Ossia (2010) – Clarinet, cello.
- Cry Out (2009) – viola, oboe, marimba, piano.
- ISO(R) (2004) – flute, cello, piano.
- Ekuboleni Khunempilo (2001) – Mezzo-soprano, flute, viola.
