= South African National Youth Orchestra Foundation =

South African-based foundation

South African National Youth Orchestra
- Abbreviation: SA NYO, NYO or Nationals
- Formation: 1964
- Type: National Youth Orchestra
- Headquarters: Cape Town & Pretoria, South Africa
- Management: The Nationals Team
- Main organ: Board of Directors
- Parent organisation: SANYOF
- Website: www.sanyo.org.za

The South African National Youth Orchestra Foundation is a non-profit organisation in the music education and development sector. The Foundation supports the training and development of South Africa's young musicians through national courses, national and international tours and workshops, and networks nationally and internationally. It also assists regional youth orchestra and music education programmes countrywide. It organises youth orchestra courses, where the South African National Youth Orchestras are formed. This has included the South African National Youth Orchestra, South African National Concert Orchestra, the South African National Wind Orchestra, the South African National Youth Baroque Orchestra, South African National Youth Brass and the South African National Youth String Orchestra. Members of these orchestras are under the age of 25.

== The Foundation ==
Sasol was the main sponsor from 1979 to 2014 when the Foundation was formed to look after the South African National Youth Orchestra (formed in 1964). The Foundation has also been supported by De Beers, Rupert Musiekstigting, Adcock-Ingram, Southern African Music Rights Organisation (SAMRO), Blackie and Associates, Primedia (1998 tour), AECI, and Business & Arts South Africa over a number of years. SANYOF has a management team and is assisted by a large network of volunteers. The Foundation is a cooperating member of the European Federation of National Youth Orchestras (EFNYO).

== Courses ==
The orchestra courses are held every year during the school holidays, in a different city in South Africa. Courses have been presented in Bloemfontein, Durban, Cape Town, Johannesburg, Port Elizabeth, Pretoria, Potchefstroom, Hartbeespoort and Stellenbosch. Repertoire includes a wide variety of works by baroque, romantic, 20th century and contemporary composers, with an emphasis on performing works by South African composers. This course has also been known as an opportunity to participate in chamber music, socialise and establish friendships.

== History ==
The course first started as a holiday music camp at Hartbeespoort Dam in 1964, with 87 participants, organised by the South African Society of Music Teachers (SASMT). The early pioneers included Korie Koornhof, Arthur Wegelin, Paul Loeb van Zuilenburg, Diane Heller and Betty Pack together with the first conductor, Leo Quayle.

The seeds those early pioneers sowed quickly took root and in 1975 the SA National Youth Orchestra took part in the International Festival of Youth Orchestras in Aberdeen, followed by a short tour of Europe three years later. In 1979, Sasol came on board as a founding partner of the National Youth Orchestra Foundation to provide infrastructure and organisational skills. Sasol remains a committed partner to this day, providing sponsorship for the annual youth orchestra course and its development initiatives.

The South African National Youth Orchestra Foundation holds courses around the country with tutelage by top local and international teachers and conductors.

Under the management of Dorothy van de Geest and with the help of her husband, Professor Gerard van de Geest, the South African National Youth Orchestra reached unprecedented levels, performing in Scotland, in Europe and in Red Square in Moscow.

In 2006, the South African National Youth Orchestra took part in the Beethoven festival in Bonn performing a programme of South African works in addition to Beethoven's symphony no. 5.

== Highlights ==
- 1974 Orchestra course held in Durban with 260 participants. Two participants (Piet Koornhof - violin, and Human Coetzee - Cello) invited to Interlochen, Michigan to play in the Interlochen World Youth Symphony Orchestra. EMI produces a record of the course.
- 1975 The NYO participates in the Aberdeen International Youth Festival in Scotland and tours Europe. They form part of a mass orchestra conducted by Claudio Abbado.
- 1978 The NYO tours Israel, featuring in the Festival of Youth Orchestra held in honour of the 30th anniversary of the State of Israel. Tour continues to France and Switzerland.
- 1980 Founding of the South African National Youth Orchestra Foundation.
- 1984 The NYO performs the commissioned work "Half Moon" together with choirs from Soweto and Sebokeng. The SABC broadcasts a documentary featuring the orchestra course.
- 1988 The SABC broadcasts a documentary on the history and background of the Course. Gérard Korsten conducts the National Youth Orchestra in a SABC-TV studio recording.
- 1994 The NYO participates in the Aberdeen International Youth Festival with the performance broadcast on BBC 3.
- 1998 The NYO participates in a massed concert on Red Square, Moscow, in a performance that was televised worldwide. Further performance at the Moscow Conservatory.
- 2000 The NYO participates in the Aardklop arts festival in Potchefstroom.
- 2006 The NYO performs at the Beethovenfest in Bonn, Germany.
- 2010 The NYO:Strings participate in the National Arts Festival in Grahamstown, and the NYO is led by a female conductor, Ewa Strusińska, for the first time.
- 2011 Archbishop Emeritus Desmond Tutu narrates the Young Person's Guide to the Orchestra by Benjamin Britten.
- 2012 In April the National Youth Orchestra performs in the pit alongside musicians from the Lucerne Festival Orchestra, Mahler Chamber Orchestra and the Trondheim Soloists in their first opera production produced by Umculo Cape Festival of The Fairy Queen by Henry Purcell. In June the National Youth Orchestra performs with jazz and Afro-pop singer Judith Sephuma.
- 2013 In January the NYO tours South Africa with Sir Roger Norrington and the Zurich Chamber Orchestra with NYO alumnus Robert Pickup as soloist.
- 2014 The orchestra celebrated its 50th birthday with a special summer course in Cape Town, the first half culminating in a performance with soprano Barbara Hendricks and saxophonist Magnus Lindgren at the Kirstenbosch National Botanical Garden. In the second half of the course, the orchestra is joined by alumni from around the world to perform Stravinsky's The Rite of Spring under the baton of Osmo Vänskä.
- 2015 The Foundation started the year off with a tour around South Africa with world-renowned flautist Sir James Galway and the Zurich Chamber Orchestra. Musicians from the National Youth Orchestra performed with the Zurich Chamber Orchestra to standing ovations across the country. The annual National Youth Winter course took place in Potchefstroom with two orchestras: The National Youth Wind Orchestra conducted by Bjørn Breistein and the National Youth String Orchestra conducted by Matheu Kieswetter. The course ended with a concert at The Snowflake, Potchefstroom and the following evening at The Orbit, Braamfontein. During the year, the Foundation has also hosted various What It Takes courses: an intensive orchestral programme designed to provide advanced candidates the opportunity to sharpen their professional skills and give them access to the National Youth Orchestra's local and international professional networks.
- 2016 The National Youth Orchestra teamed up with South African band Bombshelter Beast to play a programme that ranged in style from kwaito to Boeremusiek, and Indian Classical to Western Classical.
- 2017 The National Youth Wind Orchestra performed a children's concert programme with alumnus David Scarr on the podium at the National Arts Festival.

== Past conductors ==
Leo Quayle (South Africa)
John Arnold (United Kingdom)
Anton Hartman (South Africa)
Avi Ostrowsky (Israel)
Alberto Bolet (USA)
Alois Hochstraser (Austria)
Ali (Alexander) Rahbari (Austria)
Howard Griffiths (Switzerland)
John Hopkins (Australia)
Reinhard Schwarz (Austria)
Bernhard Gueller (Germany)
Gérard Korsten (South Africa)
Viktor Yampolsky (USA)
Omri Hadari (Israel)
Robert Maxym (Germany)
Hikotaro Yazaki (Japan)
Conrad van Alphen (South Africa)
Stefan Solyom (Sweden)
Fredrik Burstedt (Sweden)
Ewa Strusińska (Poland)
Gerben Grooten (Netherlands)
Christian Baldini (Argentina)
Adam Cooke (Ireland)
Bjørn Breistein (Norway)
Sean Kierman (South Africa)
Catherine Larsen-Maguire (United Kingdom) Matheu Kieswetter (South Africa)
Osmo Vänskä (Finland) David Scarr (South Africa)

== See also ==
- Hugo Lambrechts Music Centre
- NewMusicSA
- List of youth orchestras

== Sources ==
- Official brochure of the Sasol South African National Youth Orchestra Course 2009
