= Robyn Orlin =

South African dancer and choreographer (born 1955)

Robyn Orlin (born 1955) is a South African dancer and choreographer, born in Johannesburg.

Nicknamed in South Africa "a permanent irritation", she is well known for reflecting the difficult and complex realities in her country. Integrating different media (text, video, plastic arts) she investigates a certain theatrical reality which has enabled her to find her unique choreographic vocabulary.

She was awarded Chevalier de l’Ordre Natonale du Merite in 2009, and Chevalier dans l’Ordre des Arts et des Lettres in 2015.

== Choreographies ==
- 198? : I'm Skilled at the Art of Falling Apart
- 1990 : If You Can’t Change the World Change Your Curtains
- 1994 : In a corner the sky surrenders conception et interprétation Robyn Orlin
- 1996 : Naked on a goat (prix FNB Vita)
- 1999 : Daddy, I’ve Seen This Piece Six Times Before and I Still Don’t Know Why They’re Hurting Each Other
- 2000 : F.(Untitled) (On Trying to Understand a Classic)
- 2001 : The future may be bright, but it’s not necessarily orange… in collaboration with Ann Crosset
- 2001 : 'We Must Eat Our Suckers With the Wrapper On'
- 2002 : Ski-Fi-Jenni
- 2004 : Although I live inside... my hair will always reach towards the sun... in collaboration with Sophiatou Kossoko
- 2005 : When I Take Off My Skin and Touch the Sky With My Nose, Only Then Can I See Little Voices Amuse Themselves
- 2006 : Hey dude... I have talent I'm just waiting for God in collaboration with Vera Mantero
- 2007 : L'Allegro, il penseroso ed il moderato (F. Haendel) a piece for Opéra national de Paris - the Paris national Opera
- 2010 : Call it..Kissed by the Sun..Better still the Revenge of Geography Creation for and with Ibrahim Sissoko; Première: 19. January 2010 Paris at the Théatre de la Ville - Théâtre des Abesses
- 2011 : ...Have You Hugged, Kissed and Respected Your Brown Venus Today?
- 2012 : Beauty Remained for Just a Moment then Returned Gently to Her Starting Position, collaboration with Sylvia Glasser's collective Moving into Dance Mophatong
- 2012 : Babysitting tête de cire avec cinq gardiens in Palais des beaux-arts of Lille
- 2013 : In a World Full of Butterflies, It Takes Balls to Be a Caterpillar... Some Thoughts on Falling...
- 2014 : Coupé-décalé, collaboration with James Carlès
- 2016 : And So You See... Our Honourable Blue Sky and Ever Enduring Sun... Can Only Be Consumed Slice By Slice... with Albert Silindokuhle Ibokwe Khoza
- 2017 : Oh Louis... We Move from the Ballroom to Hell While We Have to Tell Ourselves Stories at Night So That We Can Sleep with Benjamin Pech
- 2021 : And when we change... with students of the dance training department of HFMDK (Frankfurt am Main), Birgit Neppl (costumes), Cedrik Fermont (sound design)
- 2021 : We wear our wheels with pride and slap your streets with color ... we said 'bonjour' to satan in 1820 ... with Moving Into Dance Mophatong dancers : Sunnyboy Motau, Oscar Buthelezi, Eugene Mashiane, Lesego Dihemo, Sbusiso Gumede and Teboho Letele, lights Romain de Lagarde, music UkhoiKhoi with Yogin Sullaphen and Anelisa Stuurman, video Eric Perroys, costumes, Birgit Neppl
- 2022 : In a corner the sky surrenders - unplugging archival journeys ... # 1 (for Nadia) ... with Nadia Beugré, music and sound Cedrik Fermont, costumes Birgit Neppl, set Annie Tolleter
- 2023 : We must eat our suckers with the wrappers on ... Variation #1 with Mosie Mamaregane

== Movie ==
- 2005 : Hidden beauties Dirty stories
