= Waterphone =

Type of atonal acoustic musical instrument

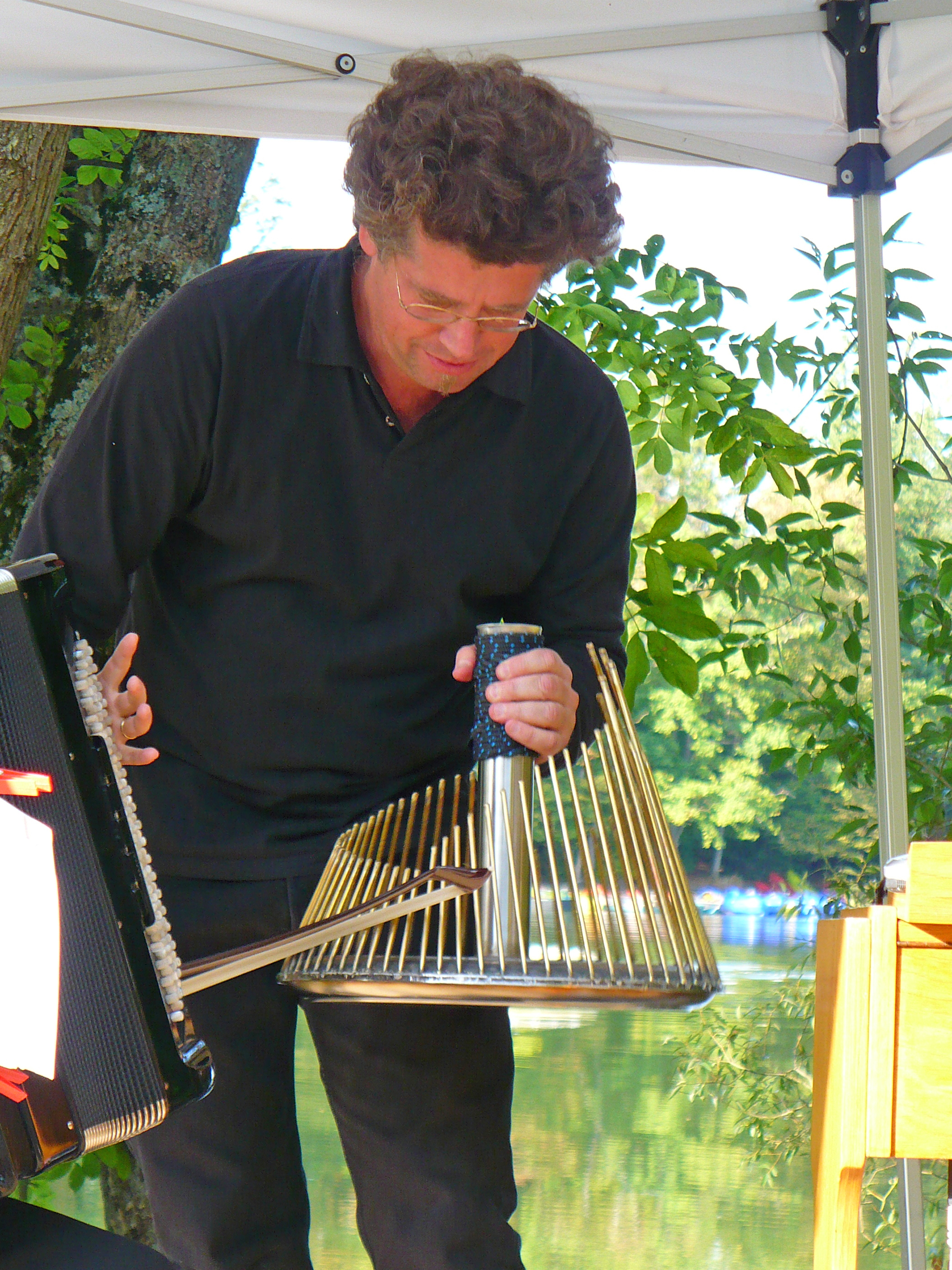
Musician Thomas Bloch playing the waterphone, 19 September 2009 at the Mittersheim pond, France

A waterphone (also ocean harp) is a type of inharmonic acoustic tuned idiophone consisting of a stainless steel resonator bowl or pan with a cylindrical neck and bronze rods of different lengths and diameters around the rim of the bowl. The resonator may contain a small amount of water giving the waterphone a vibrant ethereal sound that has appeared in movie soundtracks, record albums, and live performances. The instrument was invented, developed, and manufactured by American Richard Waters (1935–2013).

The waterphone was available in four sizes: the Standard (7" diameter), the Whaler (12" diameter), the Bass (14" diameter), and the MegaBass (16" diameter). It is generally played in a seated position by a soloist and either bowed or drummed, played as a friction or struck idiophone, with movements to affect the water inside. This combines the resonant characteristics of the bowl and rods in combination with the movement of the water. The sound of the waterphone is often used to evoke mystery and suspense. A superball mallet has become the prime way of drumming the waterphone.

The waterphone is a modern invention influenced by a Tibetan drum—encountered by the inventor in the early sixties—containing a small amount of water affecting its timbre. It is also related to the nail violin, which also used a resonator and rods (nails), and is struck or bowed.

== Use ==
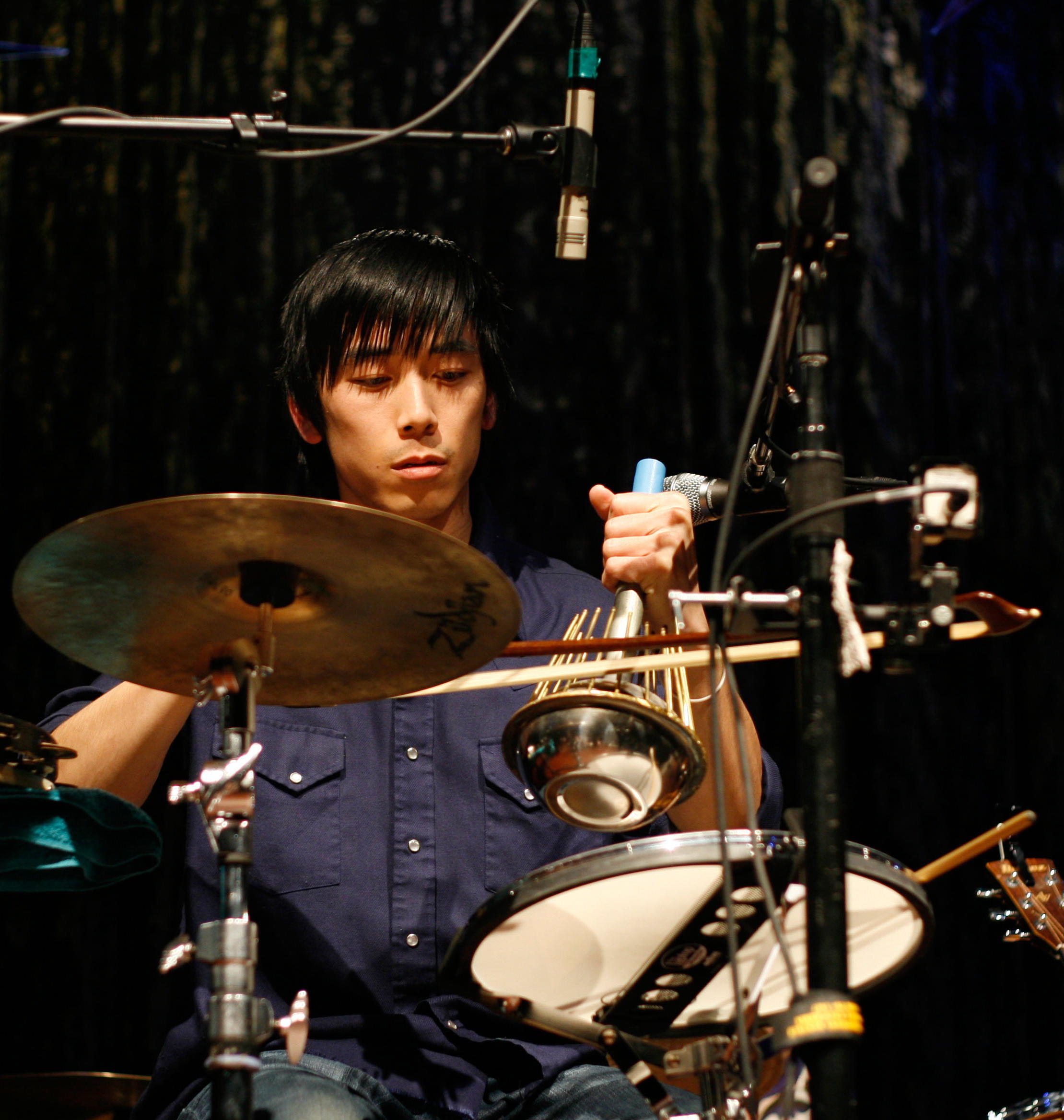
Percussionist Alex Wong bowing a Standard waterphone

The waterphone has been exhibited in museums and galleries and is the subject of several short documentaries including "Art Notes," aired on public television in San Francisco, and "Celestial Wave," a movie short. Over recent decades the waterphone has become popular with symphonies, touring bands, and recording studios. Contemporary classical composers who have written parts for waterphone in compositions include Sofia Gubaidulina, Jerry Goldsmith, John Mackey, Dan Forrest, Christopher Rouse, Colin Matthews, John Woolrich, Carson Cooman, Andi Spicer, Ludovico Einaudi, Andrew Carter, Jörg Widmann, Bernie Krause of Beaver & Krause, and Todd Barton.

The instrument has also been used prominently by rock musicians. Siouxsie Sioux's drummer and percussionist, Budgie, used it on the Creatures' 1983 album, Feast.

Canadian musician and composer, Robert Minden, has been composing for his collection of five vintage waterphones on many recordings since the mid-1980s. His ensemble, The Robert Minden Ensemble, formed with daughters Andrea and Dewi Minden and colleagues Carla Hallett and Nancy Walker in 1986, features the waterphone as a central instrument within their 'found object' orchestra.

The waterphone is used to great effect in Howard Goodall's The Dreaming, a musical commissioned by The National Youth Music Theatre of Great Britain, based on Shakespeare's A Midsummer Night's Dream. Goodall uses its ethereal sounds to evoke the mystery of the woods. In Derek Bourgeois' Symphony No 59 – Percussion symphony, which requires 16 percussion players there is a very prominent part for waterphone.

The waterphone has been featured in the soundtracks to many movies, including Poltergeist, Let the Right One In (2008), The Matrix, Star Trek: The Motion Picture, Dark Water, Crouching Tiger, Hidden Dragon, ALIENS, The Spirit, Female Perversion, as well as TV production 24. Tan Dun's opera The First Emperor (2006) & "Water Music" feature the waterphone. A sound sample can be found at The FreeSound Project. There is a yearly "Waterphone Music Competition" sponsored by Richard Waters. It has also been featured heavily as a sound effect in shows such as Gordon Ramsay's Kitchen Nightmares and Hell's Kitchen (though only in the US versions), which was also used in the Bravo (UK) idents between 1997 and 1998.

The waterphone may be played in water and on several occasions has been successfully used to call whales and other cetaceans, especially by Jim Nollman. The true story of such interspecies communication was the basis of the stage show and album The Boy Who Wanted To Talk To Whales by The Robert Minden Ensemble in 1989.

Jean-Michel Jarre has used the Hyperstellar Waterphone on his album "Oxymore" (2022).

== Development and innovation ==
The Evelyn Glennie hyperstellar Waterphone is the first double chambered waterphone. Two sound chambers are connected with a pipe and one of them has also additional pipe, which is open. Each sound chamber has a set of rods attached. The instrument is characterized by very deep bass sound and very long reverberation. It was designed by Sławek Janus and Evelyn Glennie who come up with the idea and provided some initial drawings.

== See also ==
- Daxophone
- Glass harmonica
- Water organ
- Hydraulophone
