= John Hopkins (conductor) =

Australian conductor

John Raymond Hopkins AM OBE (19 July 1927 – 30 September 2013) was a British-born Australian conductor and administrator.

== Career ==
John Hopkins was born in Yorkshire in 1927. He was the assistant conductor of the BBC Scottish Orchestra from 1949 to 1952 and then conductor of the BBC Northern Orchestra until 1957. He relocated to New Zealand in 1957 to succeed James Robertson as conductor of the then National Orchestra (now the New Zealand Symphony Orchestra). In 1959 he founded the New Zealand National Youth Orchestra. He was present for the orchestra's 50th anniversary season in 2009. As part of his contribution to youth music he also conducted the South African National Youth Orchestra.

Hopkins moved to Australia in 1963. As the Federal Director of Music for the Australian Broadcasting Commission (ABC), Hopkins began a number of innovations within the ABC's Concert Music Division, such as starting an Australian Promenade (Proms) series in Sydney in 1965 and broadcasting international avant-garde classical music. As a part of the Proms concerts, Hopkins programmed a variety of music, from the Renaissance, performed by the Sydney group the Renaissance Players, the then rarely performed music of Hector Berlioz, Gustav Mahler and Sir Edward Elgar, avant-garde music from overseas and Australia. The Australian composers who wrote music for the concerts included Peter Sculthorpe, Nigel Butterley and Richard Meale. Hopkins resigned from the Director's post in 1973 due to a number of factors, including tensions with staff within the ABC Concert Music Division. In 1974 he became the inaugural dean of the School of Music at the newly formed Victorian College of the Arts (VCA) (now the University of Melbourne Faculty of VCA and MCM).

In 1974, Hopkins led the world premiere of Peter Sculthorpe's opera/music theatre work Rites of Passage. He was director of the Sydney Conservatorium of Music from 1986 to 1991. He conducted the Auckland Philharmonia Orchestra in 1987 in one of New Zealand's first Orchestral Composers' Reading Workshops. He was a professor of conducting at the University of Melbourne, Faculty of VCA and MCM, along with guest conducting with community and youth orchestras until the time of his death.

Hopkins died on 30 September 2013, aged 86.

== Career ==
- Assistant conductor, BBC Scottish Orchestra, 1949–52
- Conductor, BBC Northern Orchestra, 1952–57
- Conductor, New Zealand National Orchestra (now New Zealand Symphony Orchestra), 1957–63
- Federal Director of Music, Australian Broadcasting Commission, 1963–73
- Dean of School of Music, Victorian College of the Arts, Melbourne, 1973–86
- Director, Sydney Conservatorium of Music, 1986–91

== Honours and awards ==
Hopkins was named an Officer of the Order of the British Empire (OBE) in the Queen's Birthday Honours of 1970. He was appointed a Member of the Order of Australia (AM) in the Queen's Birthday Honours of 2013 "for significant service to the performing arts, particularly as a conductor, to music education, and to the community".

=== Bernard Heinze Memorial Award ===
The Sir Bernard Heinze Memorial Award is given to a person who has made an outstanding contribution to music in Australia.

Year	Nominee / work	Award	Result
1991	John Hopkins	Sir Bernard Heinze Memorial Award	awarded
