= Yogin Sullaphen =

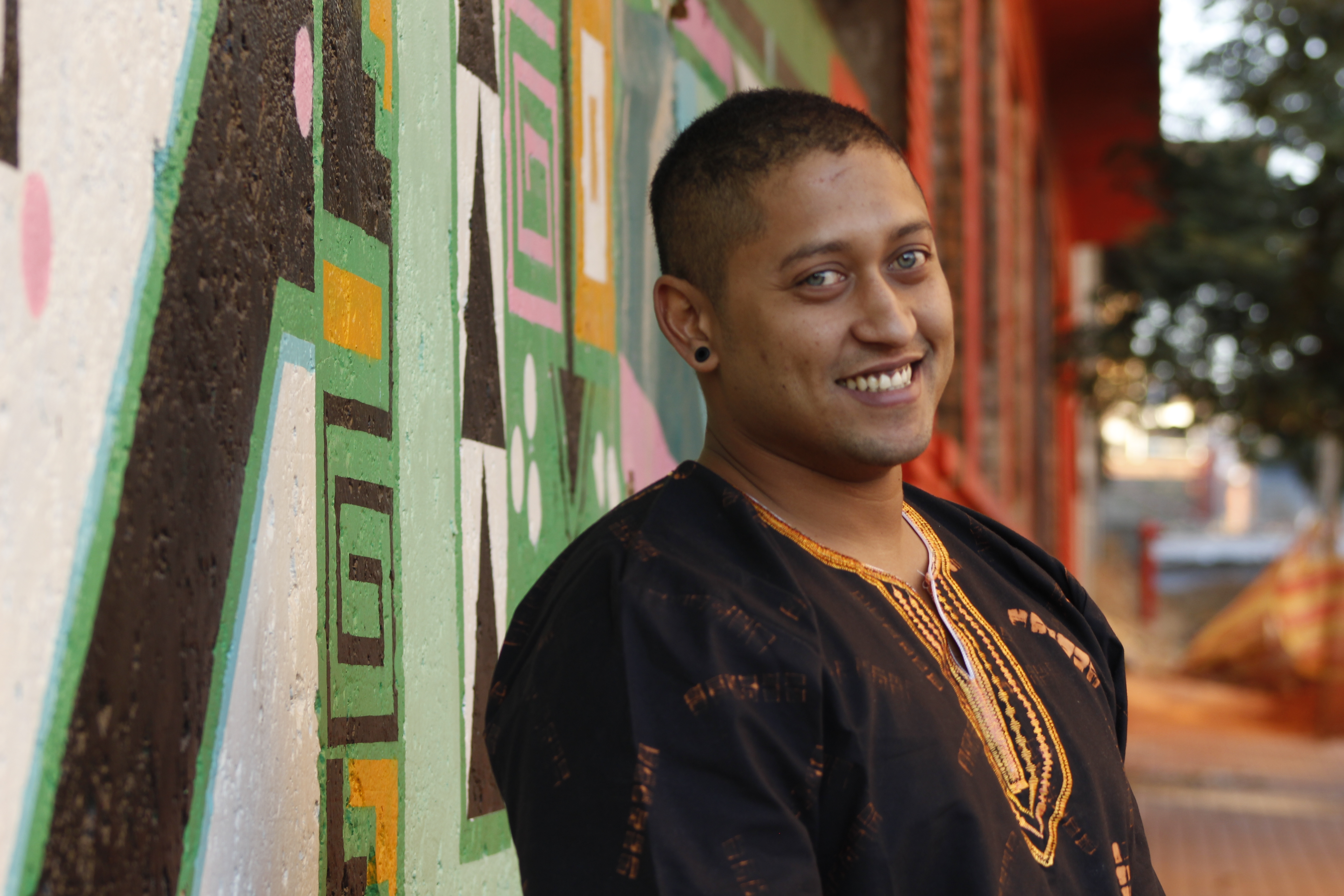

Background information
- Born: 8 January 1986 (age 40); Durban, South Africa
- Genres: African; indigenous; electronic; pop; rock; jazz; classical; traditional; blues; experimental; noise music; instrumental; world music; ambient music; children's music
- Occupations: musician; composer; sound designer; music producer; live-looper; guitar teacher
- Instruments: guitar; bass; flute; drums; keyboard; African percussion instruments
- Years active: 2012–present
- Member of: uKhoiKhoi

Yogin Rajoo Sullaphen (born 8 January 1986) is a South African composer, music producer, live-looper and multi-instrumentalist. He is a member of the musical duo uKhoiKhoi, where his live-looping practices are a feature of their stage performances. Sullaphen is also known for composing and performing as part of theatre productions and performance art projects, which has earned him three nominations for Naledi Theatre Awards, which recognize excellence in South African theatre.

== Early life ==
Sullaphen was born in Durban, South Africa, and relocated to Johannesburg during his teenage years. He comes from a mixed-heritage background, with a South African Indian father and a Coloured mother. His diverse background exposed him to a wide range of musical influences, ranging from popular music of the 1970s and 1990s to Indian classical music and avant-garde jazz rock. Sullaphen did not receive formal music training until after high school when he decided to pursue a career in music and went on to complete a Bachelor of Music (BMus) at the University of the Witwatersrand in Johannesburg, majoring in composition.

== Career ==
Sullaphen began his career as a guitar teacher at a private school in Johannesburg before transitioning to freelance work in music, primarily focusing on composition and production.

Sullaphen's music compositions for theatre productions have earned him three nominations for Naledi Theatre Awards. He was nominated in the "best original score" category for the production "Jungfrau" in 2019, and for "best sound design/soundscape" for "Strange Land" in 2020, both directed by award-winning South African theatre director Jade Bowers. In 2026, he was nominated for a Naledi Theatre Award in the “best original score/soundscape” category for the theatre production “Gabo Legwala”, a work created in collaboration with award-winning poet Modise Sekgothe and vocalist Phumla Siyobi.

Sullaphen has worked extensively with acclaimed South African director and choreographer Robyn Orlin on stage productions that have been performed internationally. Between 2012 and 2017, his composition for Orlin's "Beauty remained for just a moment…" toured extensively in France and throughout Europe. Since 2021, Sullaphen – as part of the live-looping band uKhoiKhoi – has been performing in Europe, Asia and the United States of America in Orlin’s stage production titled “We wear our wheels with pride…”. In 2024, this production was performed for the first time in South Africa at the JOMBA! Dance Festival where Orlin was honoured as the 2024 JOMBA! Legacy Artist. Since mid-2024, uKhoiKhoi has also performed throughout Europe with “How in salts desert is it possible to blossom...”, another stage production by Orlin.

Sullaphen has also composed for and performed internationally with world-renowned South African choreographer Kieron Jina and, more recently, with multi-award-winning choreographer Gregory Maqoma. Sullaphen formed part of the musical cast that composed and performed the music for Maqoma’s work, "Genesis - The Beginning and End of Time", which premiered at the 2025 Weimar Arts Festival in Germany, before it was staged in Cape Town and Johannesburg, South Africa, in early 2026.

In another collaboration, Sullaphen worked with Modise Sekgothe, winner of the 2025 Standard Bank Young Artist Award for Poetry, to create a stage production titled “Gabo Legwala”, that was performed at the 2025 National Arts Festival in Makhanda, South Africa, followed by performances at the Market Theatre in Johannesburg.

In 2026, Sullaphen joined forces with multi-award-winning performance artist Albert Ibokwe Khoza to create a work titled “Dear Museum! The Truth of the Matter: It Seems Everything Was Better When We Were Not Telling the Truth”. This work, which questioned Western ethnological museum practices and explored the presentation of cultural artefacts in museum collections, was performed at the Humboldt Forum in Berlin, as well as the 2026 National Arts Festival in Makhanda.

In 2019, Sullaphen, along with vocalist and performing artist Anelisa "Annalyzer" Stuurman, founded the live-looping band uKhoiKhoi. This duo blends indigenous and electronic music to honour their ancestors and address societal injustices. uKhoiKhoi released a self-titled 3-track EP in 2020 and their second EP "Nongqawuse" was released in 2022. In addition to the international tours with Robyn Orlin's productions, uKhoiKhoi has performed at Sauti za Busara, an annual African music festival in Zanzibar, Tanzania; the 2025 Ruhrtriennale, a music and arts festival in Germany; as well as at music festivals and events across South Africa, such as Mieliepop and Fête de la Musique.

== Works and performances ==
=== Works for theatre and film ===
Title	Date	Event / Venue, City & Country	Role
Beauty remained for just a moment then returned gently to her starting position (by Robyn Orlin with Moving into Dance Mophatong)	2012-2017	Biennale de la danse, Lyon (France) (premiere, Sep 2012)	Composer
Down To Earth (by Kieron Jina & Marc Philipp Gabriel)	Feb 2017	Tanzfabrik Berlin (Germany)	Composer & performer
Down To Earth (by Kieron Jina & Marc Philipp Gabriel)	May 2017	Haus der Berliner Festspiele, Berlin (Germany)	Composer & performer
Down To Earth (by Kieron Jina & Marc Philipp Gabriel)	Jul 2017	National Arts Festival, Makhanda (South Africa (SA))	Composer & performer
Jungfrau (by Jade Bowers)	Jun 2018	National Arts Festival, Makhanda (SA)	Composer & performer
Jungfrau (by Jade Bowers)	Jun 2018	Festival Theaterformen, Braunschweig (Germany)	Composer & performer
Between Horizons (by Kieron Jina & Marc Philipp Gabriel)	Jul 2018	National Arts Festival, Makhanda (SA)	Composer & performer
Emoyeni (by Umlilo and Sean K)	Aug 2018	Song production (funded by Pro Helvetia)	Producer
Rise of the African Queer (by Kieron Jina)	Apr 2019	South African State Theatre, Pretoria (SA)	Composer & performer
Strange Land (by Jade Bowers)	Jun 2019	Market Theatre, Johannesburg (SA)	Composer
Shhh! The Musical (by Jade Bowers & University of Johannesburg (UJ) Arts Academy)	Oct 2019	University of Johannesburg, Johannesburg (SA)	Composer, performer, song writer, arrangement & music director
Pause (by Kieron Jina)	Feb 2020	Centre for the Less Good Idea, Johannesburg (SA)	Composer
Darkie (by Katlego Letsholonyane)	Mar 2020	POPArt Theatre, Johannesburg (SA)	Composer, performer & sound design
Chameleon Home (by Kieron Jina & Mathias Becker)	Jul 2020	Die Irritierte Stadt Online Festival (Germany)	Composer & sound design
Mothers Grimm (by Jade Bowers & UJ Arts Academy)	Jul 2020	Virtual National Arts Festival, Makhanda (SA)	Film composer
Mothers Grimm (by Jade Bowers & UJ Arts Academy)	Oct 2022	Vrystaat Arts Festival, Bloemfontein (SA)	Composer & performer
Zebras Crossing Video Series (by The Zebras Crossing Collective)	2021	Online videos (funded by British Council)	Concept design, producer & composer
Pusha Pressa Phanda (by Dick d’vLz Reubïn)	Released May 2021	Film (produced by Layla Swart)	Film composer
The Empire Builders (by Dintshitile Mashile & Kwasha! Theatre Company)	Feb 2021	Online (binaural audio play)	Composer, recording, music & sound director
We wear our wheels with pride, we slap your streets with color…we say ‘bonjour’ to satan in 1820 (by Robyn Orlin with Moving into Dance Mophatong & uKhoiKhoi)	Jun 2021	Paris (France)	Composer & performer
We wear our wheels with pride, we slap your streets with color…we say ‘bonjour’ to satan in 1820 (by Robyn Orlin with Moving into Dance Mophatong & uKhoiKhoi)	Aug 2022	Tanzforum Berlin (Germany)	Composer & performer
We wear our wheels with pride, we slap your streets with color…we say ‘bonjour’ to satan in 1820 (by Robyn Orlin with Moving into Dance Mophatong & uKhoiKhoi)	Nov–Dec 2022	Romaeuropa Festival, Rome (Italy)	Composer & performer
We wear our wheels with pride, we slap your streets with color…we say ‘bonjour’ to satan in 1820 (by Robyn Orlin with Moving into Dance Mophatong & uKhoiKhoi)	Nov–Dec 2022	Paris Autumn Festival, Paris; Toulouse & Le Havre (France)	Composer & performer
We wear our wheels with pride, we slap your streets with color…we say ‘bonjour’ to satan in 1820 (by Robyn Orlin with Moving into Dance Mophatong & uKhoiKhoi)	Nov–Dec 2022	Luxembourg (Luxembourg)	Composer & performer
We wear our wheels with pride, we slap your streets with color…we say ‘bonjour’ to satan in 1820 (by Robyn Orlin with Moving into Dance Mophatong & uKhoiKhoi)	Nov–Dec 2022	Dusseldorf (Germany)	Composer & performer
We wear our wheels with pride, we slap your streets with color…we say ‘bonjour’ to satan in 1820 (by Robyn Orlin with Moving into Dance Mophatong & uKhoiKhoi)	Mar 2023	Oslo (Norway)	Composer & performer
We wear our wheels with pride, we slap your streets with color…we say ‘bonjour’ to satan in 1820 (by Robyn Orlin with Moving into Dance Mophatong & uKhoiKhoi)	Mar 2023	Amsterdam & The Hague (Netherlands)	Composer & performer
We wear our wheels with pride, we slap your streets with color…we say ‘bonjour’ to satan in 1820 (by Robyn Orlin with Moving into Dance Mophatong & uKhoiKhoi)	Aug 2023	Zürich (Switzerland)	Composer & performer
We wear our wheels with pride, we slap your streets with color…we say ‘bonjour’ to satan in 1820 (by Robyn Orlin with Moving into Dance Mophatong & uKhoiKhoi)	Dec 2023	Bruges (Belgium)	Composer & performer
We wear our wheels with pride, we slap your streets with color…we say ‘bonjour’ to satan in 1820 (by Robyn Orlin with Moving into Dance Mophatong & uKhoiKhoi)	Sep 2024	JOMBA! Dance Festival, Durban & Johannesburg (SA)	Composer & performer
We wear our wheels with pride, we slap your streets with color…we say ‘bonjour’ to satan in 1820 (by Robyn Orlin with Moving into Dance Mophatong & uKhoiKhoi)	Oct 2024	Fribourg (Switzerland)	Composer & performer
We wear our wheels with pride, we slap your streets with color…we say ‘bonjour’ to satan in 1820 (by Robyn Orlin with Moving into Dance Mophatong & uKhoiKhoi)	Oct 2024	Brussels (Belgium)	Composer & performer
We wear our wheels with pride, we slap your streets with color…we say ‘bonjour’ to satan in 1820 (by Robyn Orlin with Moving into Dance Mophatong & uKhoiKhoi)	Oct 2024	Le Mans (France)	Composer & performer
We wear our wheels with pride, we slap your streets with color…we say ‘bonjour’ to satan in 1820 (by Robyn Orlin with Moving into Dance Mophatong & uKhoiKhoi)	Mar 2025	London (United Kingdom)	Composer & performer
We wear our wheels with pride, we slap your streets with color…we say ‘bonjour’ to satan in 1820 (by Robyn Orlin with Moving into Dance Mophatong & uKhoiKhoi)	Oct 2025	Asia+ Festival 2025 (Hong Kong)	Composer & performer
We wear our wheels with pride, we slap your streets with color…we say ‘bonjour’ to satan in 1820 (by Robyn Orlin with Moving into Dance Mophatong & uKhoiKhoi)	Oct 2025	Seoul (South Korea)	Composer & performer
We wear our wheels with pride, we slap your streets with color…we say ‘bonjour’ to satan in 1820 (by Robyn Orlin with Moving into Dance Mophatong & uKhoiKhoi)	Mar 2026	New York (USA)	Composer & performer
We wear our wheels with pride, we slap your streets with color…we say ‘bonjour’ to satan in 1820 (by Robyn Orlin with Moving into Dance Mophatong & uKhoiKhoi)	Nov 2026	Shanghai (China)	Composer & performer
Breaking Down Walls (by Kieron Jina)	Jun 2022	TalentLab (Luxembourg)	Composer & performer
Skeletons (by Jade Bowers & UJ Arts Academy)	Premiered Jul 2022	2022 Durban International Film Festival, Durban (SA)	Film composer
African Exodus / Surplus Circus (by Sbusiso Shozi & Nhalnhla Mahlangu with the Centre for the Less Good Idea)	Feb 2023	Komische Oper Berlin (Germany)	Performer
The Paper Double-Bill (by Jade Bowers & UJ Arts Academy)	Feb 2023	University of Johannesburg, Johannesburg (SA)	Composer & performer
Dante and Mashudu (by Johannesburg School of Mask and Movement Theatre)	Mar 2023	Pretoria, Johannesburg, Durban & Cape Town (SA)	Composer, sound design & music director
Breaths of Joburg (by Jade Bowers, Alex Halligey & UJ Arts Academy)	Apr 2023	Hillbrow, Johannesburg (SA)	Composer & performer
Hybrid (by The Zebras Crossing Collective)	Jun 2023	TalentLab (Luxembourg)	Concept design, producer, composer & performer
I Release You (by Kieron Jina)	Aug 2023	Zürich (Switzerland)	Composer
The Rise (by Kieron Jina)	Oct 2023	Glasgow (Scotland)	Composer
Spatial Fabrications: An Uninhabitable World (by PreEmpt Group Collective)	Oct–Nov 2023	Fak’ugesi Creators Online Exhibition	Composer
How in salts desert is it possible to blossom... (by Robyn Orlin with Garage Dance Ensemble & uKhoiKhoi)	Jun 2024	Marseille, Montpellier & Toulouse (France)	Composer & performer
How in salts desert is it possible to blossom... (by Robyn Orlin with Garage Dance Ensemble & uKhoiKhoi)	Nov-Dec 2024	Romaeuropa Festival, Rome (Italy)	Composer & performer
How in salts desert is it possible to blossom... (by Robyn Orlin with Garage Dance Ensemble & uKhoiKhoi)	Nov-Dec 2024	Amsterdam (Netherlands)	Composer & performer
How in salts desert is it possible to blossom... (by Robyn Orlin with Garage Dance Ensemble & uKhoiKhoi)	Nov-Dec 2024	Paris & Reims (France)	Composer & performer
How in salts desert is it possible to blossom... (by Robyn Orlin with Garage Dance Ensemble & uKhoiKhoi)	Sep 2025	Ruhrtriennale 2025, Essen (Germany)	Composer & performer
How in salts desert is it possible to blossom... (by Robyn Orlin with Garage Dance Ensemble & uKhoiKhoi)	Nov-Dec 2025	Strasbourg, Saint-Étienne-du-Rouvray, Bourges, Cannes, Saint-Nazaire, Rennes (France)	Composer & performer
A border is a line that birds cannot see (by Kieron Jina)	Jun 2025	TalentLab (Luxembourg)	Composer & performer
Gabo Legwala (by Modise Sekgothe)	Jun 2025	National Arts Festival, Makhanda (SA)	Soundscapist & performer
Gabo Legwala (by Modise Sekgothe)	Sep-Oct 2025	Market Theatre, Johannesburg (SA)	Soundscapist & performer
Genesis – The Beginning and End of Time (by Gregory Maqoma)	Aug 2025	Kunstfest Weimar (Germany)	Co-composer & performer
Genesis – The Beginning and End of Time (by Gregory Maqoma)	Feb-Mar 2026	Cape Town, Johannesburg (SA)	Co-composer & performer
Bantu (by Gregory Maqoma)	Jan 2026	University of Johannesburg, Johannesburg (SA)	Composer
Dear Museum! The Truth of the Matter: It Seems Everything Was Better When We Were Not Telling the Truth (by Albert Ibokwe Khoza)	May-Jun 2026	Humboldt Forum, Berlin (Germany)	Composer
Dear Museum! The Truth of the Matter: It Seems Everything Was Better When We Were Not Telling the Truth (by Albert Ibokwe Khoza)	Jun 2026	National Arts Festival, Makhanda (SA)	Composer
Mr Duiker Sang the Blues (directed by Greg Homann, based on an award-winning short story by Dyondzo Kwinika)	Sep-Oct 2026	Market Theatre, Johannesburg (SA)	Co-composer & performer

=== Performances with uKhoiKhoi ===
Event	Date	Venue
Social Distancing Festival	24 Mar 2020	Online performance streamed from Toronto (Canada)
Credo-Memoration	25 Jul 2020	Online performance streamed from Johannesburg (SA)
Planet Afropunk	22 Oct 2020	Online performance streamed from the USA
Pendoring Advertising Awards	13 Nov 2020	Online performances streamed from Johannesburg (SA)
Pendoring Advertising Awards	4 Nov 2021	Online performances streamed from Johannesburg (SA)
Sol.i.dar.i.ty	8 Apr 2021	Online performance streamed from Switzerland
Huddersfield Contemporary Music Festival	Dec 2021	Online performance streamed from United Kingdom
2nd World Sound Concert	27 Aug 2022	Joburg Theatre, Johannesburg (SA)
Queertopia	10 Dec 2022	Victoria Yards, Johannesburg (SA)
Mieliepop Festival	2–4 Mar 2023	Lothair, Mpumalanga (SA)
Fashion Forward: A Sonic Experience with Thebe Magugu and Spotify	15 Apr 2023	Nirox Sculpture Park, Johannesburg (SA)
Fête de la Musique	24 Jun 2023	Newtown Junction, Johannesburg (SA)
The Reimagining Heritage, Archives and Museums: Today/Tomorrow Convention	13 Feb 2024	Iziko South African National Museum, Cape Town (SA)
2024 SoCreative Summit	10 May 2024	Victoria Yards, Johannesburg (SA)
Sauti za Busara	14-16 Feb 2025	Stone Town, Zanzibar (Tanzania)
Ruhrtriennale	7 Sep 2025	Bochum (Germany)
