= KwaZulu-Natal Philharmonic Orchestra =

Professional orchestra based in Durban, South Africa

The KwaZulu-Natal Philharmonic Orchestra (KZNPO) is a professional orchestra based in Durban, South Africa. It was founded in 1983 under the name Natal Philharmonic Orchestra (NPO).

== Funding ==
The KZNPO receives funding from the eThekwini Metropolitan Municipality Municipality, the national Department of Arts and Culture, the KwaZulu-Natal provincial Department of Arts and Culture, South African National Lottery, the National Arts Council of South Africa, the Rupert Music Foundation and various individual donors.

== Staff ==
The orchestra's chief executive and artistic director is Bongani Tembe, who in 2019 celebrated 25 years in the position. British musician Andrew Young was a member of the orchestra as clarinetist, bass clarinetist and saxophonist from September 1989 till April 1996.

== Repertoire ==
In August/September 2009, the KZNPO accompanied soprano Renée Fleming on a concert tour to Durban, Pretoria and Cape Town.

In April 2011, the orchestra played the world premiere of Bongani Ndodana-Breen's opera Winnie the Opera at the State Theatre, Pretoria, with soprano Tsakane Maswanganyi in the title role of Winnie Mandela.

The 2026 'World Symphony Series' includes music by Beethoven (Egmont overture), Dvorak (Violin concerto op.53) and Brahms (Symphony no.3), and Schumann (Piano Concerto in Ami)
