= Niel van der Watt =

South African composer (born 1962)

- Born: Gerhardus Daniel van der Watt; 28 December 1962 (age 62); Pretoria, South Africa
- Occupations: Composer, Teacher

Dr Niel van der Watt (born Gerhardus Daniel van der Watt, on 28 December 1962) is a South African composer. Well known for his choral compositions, he has also established himself as a leading composer of chamber music.

== Education ==
Born into a family of teachers in Pretoria, Niel attended high school in Pietersburg (now Polokwane) in South Africa. After matriculating in 1980 he studied at the University of Pretoria, where he attained the BA Ed(Mus), BMus(Hons) cum laude and an MMus in Composition.

In 1997 he completed his Doctorate in Musicology at the University of South Africa with a doctoral dissertation on the life and works of the British composer Gerald Finzi.

== Career ==
After his military service in the old South African Defence Force, he joined the staff of Pretoria Boys High School, a prominent South African public school, where he was head of the Music Department and was, until recently, conductor of both the orchestra and Dixie Band. While he is a full-time teacher, he dedicates much of his time to composition. Van der Watt has also arranged a significant amount of traditional African music for choir as well as setting leading Afrikaans poetry to music, including the works of Antjie Krog and N.P. van Wyk Louw.

== Influences ==
While van der Watt's early works show the influence of late romanticists like Rachmaninoff and Fauré, his mastery of harmony and counterpoint reveals a deep understanding of and reverence for the great master Johann Sebastian Bach. This, offset by a keen appreciation for jazz, rock and traditional African music, has made his oeuvre especially distinctive. A key work illustrating this is the De-Commercialised American Christ's Mass (1995), which employs variations on popular Christmas carols to form a witty yet reverent incarnation of the Roman Catholic Low Mass.

== Trivia ==
- Van der Watt originally joined the staff of Pretoria Boys High School as an English teacher.
- Although he is a Protestant, he has composed a large amount of Roman Catholic liturgical music, including two Masses and a Requiem.
- He is an avid fan of the Beatles, Billy Joel and ABBA as far as popular music is concerned and is known for his dislike of Beethoven.
- In 2008 he wanted to prove to Pretoria Boys High School's Symphony orchestra that he did not dislike Beethoven at all and arranged Beethoven's 2nd movement of the Pathethique Sonata for the orchestra.
- His works have been performed in places as far flung as Russia, Réunion and Hong Kong.
- He considers himself to be a poly-stylist.
- Over the course of his career at Pretoria Boys High School, he has taught 498 Grade 12 music students.

== Select List of Works ==
Secular Choral Works

Ai, meisie, meisie; SAB

Alleen; girls chorus

As good as new; orchestra; SATB

Religious Choral Works

A De-commercialised American Christ’s Mass (1995)

i) Kyrie: Amazing Grace

ii) Gloria: Do you hear what I hear?

iii) Sanctus: White Christmas.

iv) Benedictus: Santa Claus is Coming To Town

v) Agnus Dei: Little Altar Boy

Traditional Choral Works

African Dawn (1997)

i) Boroko; girls chorus

ii) Ka Mehla; girls chorus

iii) Thobela morena; girls chorus

Works for Soloists (Vocal)

Benediction; voice and piano (1989)

Bitterbessie dagbreek; voice and piano

Die son sal weer skyn; voice and piano

Dinah Lee (1999); voice, piano, alto saxophone and double bass

Dis my plek (1985); voice and piano

Drup drup druppeltjies (1980); voice and piano;

Dust of snow (1997); voice and piano

Fides veritas labor (1990); voice and piano

Instrumental Works

Trio pour mam’selle leger e’stier; orchestra, flute, clarinet, piano

African Dawn (1997); orchestra

African Reflection (1994); orchestra

Afrika kerslied (1996); alto saxophone and piano

Aquarelle (1984); piano

Boabab (1988); orchestra

Con'Scertino (1992/1994); viola and piano

In June 1995 African songbook for mixed choir was published. It was written in co-operation with the composer Johann van der Sandt.
