= Clare Loveday =

South African composer

- Born: 22 March 1967 (age 58); South Africa
- Education: Doctorate of Music
- Alma mater: University of Witwatersrand
- Occupation: Composer
- Website: www.clareloveday.co.za

Clare Loveday (born 22 March 1967) is a South African contemporary classical music composer.

She studied at the University of the Witwatersrand in Johannesburg, and has worked as a professional pianist, a composer for the South African advertising industry, and co-ordinator for the National Research Foundation's Travelling Institute for Music Research. Loveday has also worked as a lecturer in music theory and composition at the University of the Witwatersrand. She was composer in residence at the 2014 Johannesburg International Mozart Festival.

== Biography ==
After having graduated from University of the Witwatersrand with a bachelor's degree in Music, Loveday landed a career for a few advertising companies, two of which are Standard Bank and South African Broadcasting Corporation. She returned to school in the late 1990s, and became a part-time lecturer. Once she achieved her master's degree in Music Composition, she started to collaborate with other artists and compose her own music and is most known for her saxophone pieces. Clare Loveday then became a full-time lecturer at Wits University, while working towards her doctorate in Music Composition. She has been commissioned by several organisations like "The South African Music Rights Organization" and many more. Although Loveday has worked her talents towards music composition, she has turned her career into a broader spectrum of music, including collaborations, research and teaching.

== Orchestral works ==
- Blink (2007) for two saxophones and chamber orchestra
- Duodectet (2008) for saxophone orchestra
- Concerto for alto saxophone and chamber orchestra (2009)
- Three portraits of intimacy: a concerto for piano and chamber orchestra (2014)

== Chamber music ==
- Wind-Play (2000) for soprano saxophone and piano
- Palimpsest (2001) for alto saxophone and organ
- Three-Piece Suite (2001) for clarinet quintet
- Breath (2004) for alto saxophone and piano
- Displacement (2005) for alto saxophone and piano
- 3 Excursions (2005) for saxophone quartet
- Untitled (2006) for saxophone quartet
- Charlie (2008) for clarinet, violin and cello
- Duodectet for Octet (2010) for eight saxophones
- Judgement Call (2010) for soprano and tenor saxophones
- Just So (2011) for B-flat clarinet and piano
- Just a Bite (2011) for alto saxophone and piano
- Paso Doble (2011) for saxophone ensemble and trumpet
- Hoar Frost (2011) for marimba and vibraphone
- Ribbons (2013) for oboe, viola and bass clarinet
- Fever Tree (2013) for flute, oboe, clarinet, marimba, piano, violin, viola and cello
- Eight Plus One (2014) for flute, B-flat clarinet, trumpet in C, trombone, piano, violin, viola and cello
- 48 km North-West of Kokstad (2014) for alto saxophone and guitar

== Solo instrumental ==
- Red Herring (2006) for alto saxophone
- Arc (2007) for baritone saxophone
- Floating Underwater series (2010) for solo soprano birbynė (also suitable for B-flat clarinet or soprano saxophone)
- It (2012), renamed Johannesburg Prelude 1, for solo piano
- Star-rise (2013) for solo flute
- South View (2013) for loboe (a new oboe with a low A)
- Cycles (2014), performance and installation for solo violin and hanging installation (collaboration with artist Nandipha Mntambo)

== Vocal ==
- Dream (2000) for soprano and piano
- Pure (2000) for soprano, piano and clarinet
- So Vast (2001) for soprano and plucked piano strings
- Empty (2001) for soprano and piano
- Scattering Ashes (2011) for 7-part vocal group, soprano saxophone and marimba
- Noupoort (2011) for choir and marimba

== Dramatic works ==
- The Collision Project (2006) Art installation/theatre work/concert piece for car wreck and attached string parts (collaboration with scenographer Gerhard Marx)
