= Pierre-Henri Wicomb =

South African classical composer (born 1976)

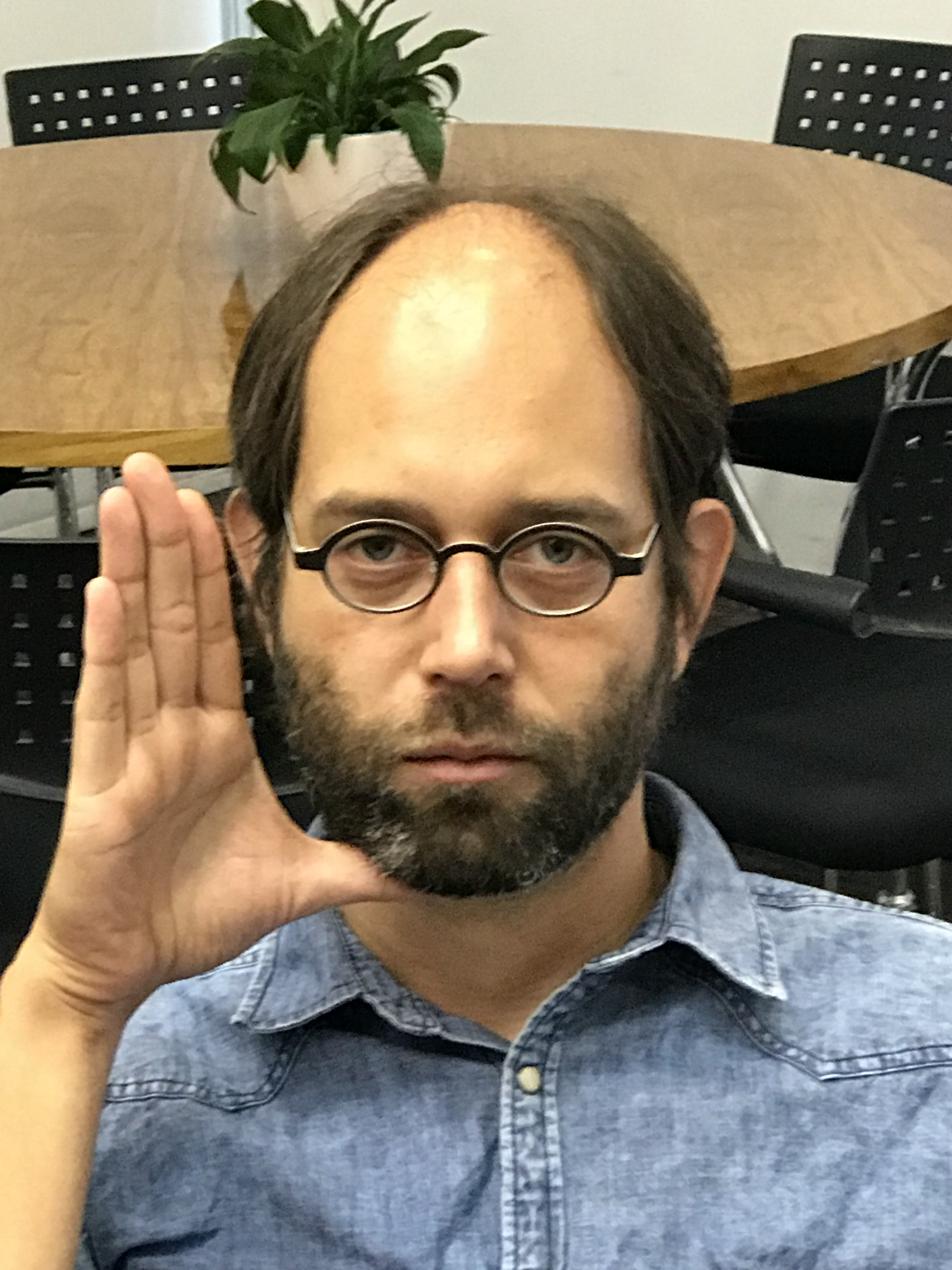
- Pierre-Henri Wicomb in 2018

Background information
- Born: Pierre-Henri Wicomb; Stellenbosch, South Africa
- Occupations: Classical music, film and theatre composer

Pierre-Henri Wicomb is a South African composer of contemporary music, including orchestral compositions, chamber music, electroacoustic works, and film scores.

== Early life and education ==
Wicomb was born in Stellenbosch, South Africa, to the late Afrikaans singer Randall Wicomb and his wife, Koba Wicomb. Pierre-Henri, along with his siblings Saskia and Koba, often performed with their father, both individually and as a family ensemble. He studied composition at the University of Stellenbosch under Roelof Temmingh and Theo Herbst, before completing a masters degree in composition at the University of Cape Town under Hendrik Hofmeyr. Following his studies in South Africa, Wicomb furthered his education in the Netherlands, specializing in contemporary music composition and electroacoustic techniques. He completed a postgraduate degree at the Koninklijk Conservatorium, studying under Gilius van Bergeijk and Diderik Haakma Wagenaar.

== Compositional style and approach ==
Pierre-Henri Wicomb's compositional style is characterized by experimental structures, extended instrumental techniques, and the integration of electronic and acoustic sound. His scores often employ non-traditional notation systems, including graphic and performer-responsive elements, which encourage interpretive engagement rather than fixed execution.

Wicomb frequently composes in close collaboration with performers, tailoring works to the specific sonic capabilities and experimental techniques of individual instruments. For example, in his clarinet work It'll be a thing..., the score evolved through rehearsal-based feedback and made use of a sound index generated by the performer.

His theatrical and electroacoustic works explore the spatial and physical dimensions of sound. In Samsa-masjien, for instance, he used contact microphones, multi-channel speaker arrays, and real-time processing to transform voice and stage noise into immersive sound environments.

In his film score for Gaia (2021), Wicomb blended acoustic timbres, including flute and Tibetan dungchen, with layered electronic textures and spectral effects. The resulting soundtrack emphasized atmospheric pacing and sonic unpredictability, contributing to the film's soundtrack.

Wicomb's experimentation with sound as a medium of memory and cultural inscription is further reflected in academic research. In a master's thesis by Ilana Cilliers (2016: 51–52), his composition de-composed is examined for its interplay of historical references and contemporary sonic manipulation. The piece integrates excerpts from Wolfgang Amadeus Mozart's Piano Concerto No. 21 in C major, K.467 (1785) alongside pre-recorded environmental sounds, which are then subjected to microphone distortion and digital processing, creating a dialogue between classical and experimental sound aesthetics. His interactive piece, Composition Machine, published in the online journal herri, is an example of his experimental approach to musical creation and audience engagement.

== Work in film and television ==
Wicomb has composed music for a variety of film and television productions, ranging from thrillers and animation to experimental cinema. His film scores employ minimalist textures, unconventional instrumentations, and electronic soundscapes. He composed the original score for the Canal+ series Spinners, which became the first South African television series to premiere at Canneseries. The series was produced in collaboration with Showmax and French broadcasters.

Wicomb also composed the soundtrack for Walt Disney's animated anthology Kizazi Moto: Generation Fire, an Afro-futurist series featuring short films from African creators. The project won an Annie Award for its representation of African futurism in animation.

He composed the score for the South African eco-horror film Gaia (2021), directed by Jaco Bouwer and produced by XYZ Films and KykNet. The film premiered at the South by Southwest (SXSW) Film Festival, where its atmospheric sound design was noted as a key element in building tension. Critics highlighted Wicomb's use of organic sounds, which mirrored the film's environmental horror themes. The Guardian described Gaia as a "chilling South African eco-horror that takes the fun out of fungi," drawing attention to its unsettling score and sound design. For his work on Gaia, Wicomb received a South African Film and Television Award (SAFTA) for Best Original Soundtrack.

== Theatre composition ==
Wicomb composed the incidental music for the South African play Samsa-masjien, written by Willem Anker and directed by Jaco Bouwer. The production premiered at the Klein Karoo Nasionale Kunstefees (KKNK) in 2012 and dealt with themes of ageing and transformation. The production won awards for Best Script, Best Actor, Best Set Design, Best Director, and Best Original Score and Sound Design at the Fleur du Cap Theatre Awards. The play received four Kanna Awards, including the Herrie Prize for Mind-Shifting Work. The play was published in 2015 by Protea Boekhuis, accompanied by a CD featuring Wicomb's original soundtrack.

== Festival curation, experimental music, and mentorship ==
Alongside composer Michael Blake, Wicomb co-founded the Purpur Festival for transgressive arts, an annual event in Cape Town dedicated to experimental classical music and performance art. The festival, hosted at Youngblood Gallery, has featured both local and international artists, including Franziska Baumann, Christoph Baumann, Sören Hermansson, the Stockholm Saxophone Quartet, Jonny Axelsson, Ivo Nilsson, Joanna Wicherek, Xiksa, Africa Open Improvising, Coila-Leah Enderstein, Joakim Sandgren, Christina Viola Oorebeek, and Andile Khumalo.

Wicomb is also a founding member and pianist of the Africa Open Improvising group, a collective dedicated to experimental and improvisational music. Through this initiative, he has explored the intersection of composition, real-time improvisation, and electronic soundscapes.

Wicomb has worked with emerging South African composers, offering guidance through platforms such as the Sterkfontein Composers Meeting, an initiative fostering collaboration between established and developing composers. Established in 2012 at the Nirox Foundation in Johannesburg, the meeting provides a space for composers to engage in daily workshop sessions with international ensembles-in-residence and guest tutors. Participants refine their compositions through collaborative rehearsals and structured discussions on compositional approaches and technical challenges.

== List of works ==
=== Orchestral works ===
- Roads to and fro (2010)

=== Opera ===
- Melody-Malady-Melody-Malady (MMMM) (2024, narrator, soprano, piano, electronics, soundtrack) for duo InterZones

=== Chamber music ===
- Polaroid (2006, clarinet, bass clarinet, viola, cello, double bass, tuba and percussion) for Schönberg ensemble
- A line for Rachael Whiteread (2007, trumpet, viola, double bass, piano and percussion) for EJNCP
- Violence made easy (2008, clarinet, viola, double bass, percussion, piano body and strings and piano) for EJNCP
- Trio (2009, viola, double bass and piano)
- Emergence (2010, saxophone, viola, double bass, piano and percussion)
- My love is trying (2010, piano, viola, double bass, percussion and narrator)
- A sound briefing: Introducing Silence (2010, flute, oboe, saxophone, cello, guitar and piano)
- ...in October (2010, mezzo-soprano and piano)
- Domicilium (2011, for any instrument adhering to the range of the music and piano)
- A[we]-struc[k]-ture (2011, countertenor, recorder, electronics and soundtrack) for Ums 'n Jip
- And so began (2013, viola, cello, piano, percussion and narrator) for L'Instant Donne
- Sing you! la-re-ti (2013, voice, saxophone, piano and soundtrack) for Potage du Jour
- Your mother's molecules (2014, bass flute, clarinet, trumpet, trombone, violin, viola, cello and piano) for Ensemble Reconsil
- [Com]poser (2014, voice, electronics and piano)
- Ever after (2014, flute, clarinet, viola, double bass and piano) for Ensemble DissonArt
- Four real (2015, string quartet)
- Pat[i]ent (2015, piano with two musicians)
- Pool (2015, trombone and percussion, including vibraphone) for duo Axelsson Nilsson
- Double Bass Concerto (2016, double bass, flute, clarinet, violin, viola, violoncello and piano) for SANME
- Three milieus (2016, voice and piano) for duo InterZones
- Game for less than two (2016, alto saxophone, clarinet in B-flat and double bass)
- Automation (2018, trombone and percussion)
- Sue-hm Kwee (2018, saxophone quartet) for the Stockholm Saxophone Quartet
- ...Juliet is the sun (2019, flute, clarinet in B-flat, violin, violoncello, piano and percussion)
- Lightning lessons (2019, xylophone and piano)
- Catch! culture (2024, eight voices) for Aurum Cantores

=== Solo music (with or without electronics) ===
- To Pulse II (2006, piano)
- Solving Solo (2006, violin)
- Karaoke later (2009, saxophone and MIDI soundtrack)
- Where music is.... (2010, piano)
- Earthed (2010, piano, electronics and soundtrack) for Petra Ronner
- Eavesdrop (2013, piano and soundtrack) for Petra Ronner
- Me [An]D (2015, piano, MIDI soundtrack)
- Solicism (2015, French horn in F and soundtrack)
- Self-portrait (2016, piano) for Coila-Leah Enderstein
- Spelling and sound (2016, violin) for Lieva Starker
- Quaver left (2016, piano)
- It'll be a thing... (2018, clarinet in B-flat) for Visser Liebenberg
- [S]kin-ship (2020, piano and soundtrack) for Joanna Wicherek
- Role-ing (2021, piano, electronics and soundtrack)
- Love.Lock.Nestle. (2024, flute and soundtrack) for Liesl Stoltz

=== Works with a theatrical component ===
- 3x3x3 (2016, city centre installation piece for 3–4 performers)
- On air (2016, seven speakers/actors on different levels)
- The gathering (2018, actor, soundtrack and participants present) for Africa Open Institute inauguration
- Trees B (2020, for violin, harp and video) for X[iksa]

=== Electronic or electroacoustic works ===
- Play.playable.playing (2005, electronic-visual piece for the notation program Sibelius)
- Bird's birds (2013, electroacoustic piece) for Concert Too
- Mozart oooh! (2013, electroacoustic piece) for Willem Anker's Samsa Masjien
- An aesthetics of rat bites (2018, electroacoustic piece) for the short film This Country is Lonely by Jaco Bouwer
- Now for triads (2018, for the robot toy piano of Ranjit Bhatnagar and MIDI soundtrack)
- Composition machine (2020, interactive online electroacoustic piece) for Herri
- BlaBlaBlaBlaBlavet (2021, electroacoustic piece)
- Evenly-hovering (2021, electroacoustic piece)
- Hommage mirage (2022, electroacoustic piece)
