= Robert Fokkens =

South African classical music composer

Robert Fokkens is a South African classical music composer. He is among a new generation of younger composers in post-apartheid South Africa. He was educated in Cape Town at Rondebosch Boys' School.

He currently teaches composition at Cardiff University School of Music.

His works are frequently performed in the UK, Europe and South Africa, including performances at the Wigmore Hall, the Purcell Room, the Holland Music Sessions, the Spitalfields Festival, the South African National Arts Festival in Grahamstown, and the Royal Festival Hall. He had works performed in Japan, Australia and the USA, and his music has been broadcast on BBC Radio 3. His music is included on a 2005 CD of South African choral music, Towards the Light, recorded by the Commotio choir.

Fokkens previously studied at the South African College of Music at the University of Cape Town with Peter Klatzow, and at the Royal Academy of Music, where he held the Manson Fellowship in 2001–2. He has received many awards and scholarships and completed his PhD, supervised by Michael Finnissy at the University of Southampton in 2006.

The composer explored writing contemporary music theatre which escapes both ‘opera’ and ‘music theatre’ traditions, and aims at a wider audience than most contemporary music. His dramatic work is in the growing field of ‘physical theatre’, inspired by companies like Frantic Assembly, Gecko, Complicité, Theatre O and Ridiculusmus.

Current musical interests are in South African traditional musics, particularly Xhosa and Zulu bow music, and jazz and electronica.

Fokkens and soprano Sarah Dacey formed Cabaret Fou under the name “Pulse” in 2006 to explore contemporary song with roots in the European cabaret tradition (like Satie, Kurt Weill and Hanns Eisler).

== Selected compositions ==
Vocal and choral

- In Times Like These [Moore, Donnelly, Shaw, Carson, Yeats] (tenor and piano, 2005)
- Four Colonizations (soprano, clarinet/bass clarinet and cello, 2005)
- Dulce et Decorum Est [Wilfred Owen] (counter-tenor and four trombones, 2002; counter-tenor and organ, 2005)
- About the Ninth Hour (SATB choir, 2004)
- Age Unknown [Fokkens] (soprano and chamber ensemble, 2001)
- Jesu Dulcis Memoria (SATB choir, 2000)

Orchestral

- And Eventful Morning Near East London [Violin Concerto] (violin and chamber orchestra, 2006)
- Uhambo Olunintsi [Journeys] (2002)
- Soshunguve Dances (Free State Youth Orchestra, 24 May 2012)
- Strobe (1999)

Large Ensemble

- To Hell and Back (string ensemble, 2000)

Instrumental

- 9 Solitudes (piano, 2006)
- Tracing Lines (quarter-tone alto flute and cello, 2006)
- On Disruption and Displacement (cello and piano, 2004; string quartet, 2005)
- Relational Study (bass clarinet, violin, cello, piano, 2003)
- Irreconcilable Truths (violin and piano, 2002)
- Black (wind quintet and piano, 2000)
- Running Out (piano, 1999)
- The True Confessions of Bonzo the Clown (clarinet and piano, 1997)

Incidental Music

- The Syringa Tree (Pamela Gien) (solo double bass, 2005)
