= Hannes Taljaard =

South African classical music composer (born 1971)

- Born: Daniël Johannes Taljaard; March 13, 1971 (age 54); Siloam, South Africa
- Occupation: Classical music composer

Hannes Taljaard, born Daniël Johannes Taljaard (born 1971) is a South African classical music composer from Siloam, Venda.

Taljaard's compositions have been performed in South Africa and Europe and he won first prize in the Flores Iuventutis competition in Ghent, Belgium, in 1994–1995. He is senior lecturer in composition and composer-in-residence at the School of Music & Conservatory at North-West University in Potchefstroom, South Africa. He has taken masterclasses with American composer George Crumb and has taken private lessons with Belgian composer Wim Henderickx in Antwerp from 1996 to 2000. He has also attended the Darmstadt New Music Summer School. He is editor of academic publication The South African Music Teacher.

His compositions are influenced by African and Arabic music.

== Orchestral works ==
- Sarabande (1996, violin and symphony orchestra)

== Chamber music ==
- Komas, 'n Koker en drie Spieëls (1992, clarinet, violoncello/bassoon, piano)
- Impromptu (1993, cello solo)
- Nacht und Träume (1993, clarinet, piano)
- Metaphor I (1996–1998, any mixed ensemble with ten performers and conductor/composer)
- Introverz (1996–1997, cello solo)
- Movement for String Quartet (1998)
- Les Sarabandes (1999–2001, piano trio) for the Erasmus Trio
- Lullaby (2000–2001, bassoon and vibraphone) for Andrea Bressan and Saverio Tasca
- Sloka (1999–2001, bassoon solo)

== Piano music ==
- Fünf zärtliche Bagatellen Fünf zärtliche Bagatellen (1993, solo)
- Drie Nokturnes 1998 vir Bart se konsert in Lier (solo) for Bart Meuris
- Two Lullabies (2001, solo)
- En Rêve – Rêvant (2003, two pianos)

== Choral music ==
- Nova Cantica Sacra (1987–1898) SATB, SSAATTBB, SMATbB, some with soloists
- Meditation I (1998) SSSS, AAAA, TTTT, BBBB
- Uittelrympies (1999) for children’s choir with violin, flute, cello and piano
- Raaiselrympies en snelsêers (1999) SSATbB (soli)
- Thula Sthandwa (2001) SMMA
- Rymelary (1999–2001) SSATbB
- Thula Sthandwa (2002) SMATbB

== Solo vocal works ==
- Song for Simeon (1993–1994, bariton, clarinet, bassoon, violins I and II, cello piano), poem by Thomas Stearns Elliot
- Drei Gebete (1994–1995, bariton, 2 celli), texts from the Lutheran Prayer Book
- Wiegieliedjies (Boek 1) (1999, soprano, clarinet, bassoon, piano) for Erica Eloff. Traditional texts.
- Wiegieliedjies (Boek 2) (1999–2001, soprano, 2 flutes, 2 clarinets, bassoon, violin, cello, harp, piano duo) for Erica Eloff. Traditional texts
- Easter Hymn – STABAT MATER (2002, soprano, clarinet, bassoon, piano) for Erica Eloff. An English text by Hannes Taljaard translated into Latin by Willemien Viljoen and Hannes Taljaard
