= Jürgen Bräuninger =

German-born South African composer (1956–2019)

Jürgen Bräuninger (13 September 1956 – 6 May 2019) was a German-born South African composer.

Jürgen Bräuninger studied at the State University of Music and Performing Arts Stuttgart with Ulrich Süsse and Erhard Karkoschka and at San Jose State University, California, with Allen Strange and Dan Wyman. He contributed to films such as The Lawnmower Man and The Dead Pit. His work has been performed by the Stuttgart Radio Symphony Orchestra, the Stockholm Saxophone Quartet, the SÜDPOOL Ensemble, and the Stuttgarter Kammerorchester as well as many other talented and recognized individual artists. He was commissioned by Süddeutscher Rundfunk Stuttgart and Südwestrundfunk. Bräuninger works have been realized at Gerald LaPierre Electro-Acoustic Music Studio and Studio für elektronische Musik. He was an associate professor in the School of Music, at the University of KwaZulu-Natal, in Durban, South Africa, where he lectured mainly in composition and music technology. Bräuninger died on 6 May 2019 at the age of 62.
