= Bongani Ndodana-Breen =

- Born: 1975 (age 50–51); Queenstown, Cape Province, South Africa
- Education: St. Andrew's College; Rhodes University (PhD, Music Composition); Stellenbosch University (Composition studies under Roelof Temmingh)
- Occupations: Composer; musician; academic; cultural activist
- Known for: First Black classical composer to win the Standard Bank Young Artist Award for Music (1998); Harmonia Ubuntu (commissioned for Nelson Mandela centenary); Advocate for cultural diversity and LGBT causes
- Notable work: Winnie The Opera; Hani; Credo; Emhlabeni; Hintsa's Dances
- Awards: Standard Bank Young Artist Award for Music (1998)

Bongani Ndodana-Breen (born 1975, in Queenstown, Cape Province, Republic of South Africa), is a South African-born composer, musician, academic and cultural activist. He is a member of the Xhosa clan. He was educated at St. Andrew's College and Rhodes University in Grahamstown (where he graduated with a PhD in Music Composition) and also studied composition in Stellenbosch under Roelof Temmingh. In 1998 Ndodana-Breen was the first Black classical composer to be awarded the prestigious Standard Bank Young Artist Award for Music, by the National Arts Festival and sponsored by Standard Bank of South Africa. He was one of Mail & Guardian 200 Young South Africans and was profiled on CNN African Voices for his work Harmonia Ubuntu commissioned for the centenary of Nelson Mandela and based on his writings and speeches. He is a fellow at the Radcliffe Institute at Harvard University for the 2019/2020 academic year.

Dr. Ndodana-Breen's music is a blend of African and classical styles. Some of his music reflects on various scenes from his native Xhosa culture (such as Hintsa's Dances, which is based on the life of Paramount Chief Hintsa ka Khawuta, Apologia at Umzimvubu and Sons of The Great Tree).

He has received commissions from across the globe from the Hong Kong Chinese Orchestra the Miller Theatre of New York, Vancouver Recital Society, Minnesota Orchestra, Madame Walker Theatre, Indianapolis Chamber Orchestra, Ensemble Noir/MusicaNoir, Southern African Music Rights Organisation (SAMRO), National Arts Council of South Africa, Haydn Festival Eisenstadt, Johannesburg International Mozart Festival, The Emancipation Festival of Trinidad & Tobago and Wigmore Hall, London (a quintet for pianist Maria João Pires).

He has written operas, orchestral and chamber works, including the opera Winnie The Opera based on anti-apartheid activist Winnie Mandela. South Africa's liberation struggle seems to be a major theme in his orchestral works such as his piano concerto Emhlabeni, the short opera Hani on the anti-apartheid activist Chris Hani and more recently the oratorio Credo, a musical testament to the Freedom Charter.

Dr. Ndodana-Breen is also an advocate for cultural diversity, supporting various African efforts including LGBT causes.

== Notable works ==
- Orange Clouds, music by Ndodana-Breen and libretto by filmmaker John Greyson
- Winnie The Opera
- Safika, piano quintet commissioned by Stellenbosch International Chamber Music Festival
- Uhambo/The Pilgrimage, opera/oratorio based on the epic poem by Guy Butler
- Zulu gazing at the Rising Sun commissioned by the Hong Kong Chinese Orchestra
- African Kaddish for orchestra
- Rituals for Forgotten Faces, chamber music cycle in 6 parts
- Apologia at Umzimvubu, string quartet
- Miniatures on Motherhood, string quartet
- Flowers in Sand, piano solo
- Visions, flute solo
- C'est tres Noir, piano duet
- Two Nguni Dances, piano trio commissioned by the Haydn Festspiele for the Haydn bi-centenary
- Hymn and Lament for the Sudan from the chamber opera Threnody & Dances
- Intlanzi yase Mzantsi, piano quintet based on Schubert's Trout Quintet
- Hani, short opera, commissioned by Cape Town Opera and the University of Cape Town
- Mzilikazi: Emhlabeni, commissioned by the Johannesburg International Mozart Festival
- Credo, oratorio with libretto by Brent Meersman based on South Africa's Freedom Charter
