= Music of Réunion =

Réunion is located east of Madagascar and is a province (département) of France. Réunion is home to maloya and sega music.

== Genres ==
=== Sega ===
Séga is a popular style that mixes African and European music.

=== Maloya ===
Maloya has a strong African element reflected in the use of slave chants and work songs.

=== Non-traditional music ===
In Réunion there is a very strong jazz community and rock culture is also becoming strong on the island.

Rap, Reggae, Zouk, Ragga and Dancehall are also popular. One popular ragga song recently is Ragga Chikungunya about the 2005 mosquito disease outbreak.

== Popular musicians ==
The most popular sega musicians include Baster, Ousanousava, and Ziskakan. The most popular maloya musicians are Danyèl Waro. Meddy Gerville and Firmin Viry. Other popular singers include Maxime Laope, Léon Céleste, Henri Madoré and Mapou, named after a kind of perfumed sugarcane candy. Musicians from nearby Mauritius are also popular.

== Popular songs ==
=== Ti Fleur Fanée ===
The unofficial national anthem of Réunion is a song originally sung by Georges Fourcade called Ti Fleur Fanée

=== Madina ===
The song "Madina" was chosen as the theme song by the Office de Radiodiffusion Télévision Française in the 1950s and 1960s. The song was written by Maxime Laope, one of the island's most popular singers, and performed by another renowned singer, Henri Madoré.

== Festivals ==
One of the biggest music festivals in Réunion is the Sakifo music festival.

== TV Programs ==
Run Vibes is a music television show that aired from 2005 to 2009 on Télé Réunion on Réunion Island. Hosted by Rodee Cox, the show featured the Music of Réunion, including Hip Hop, Reggae, Dancehall, breakdance and traditional music from Réunion (so sega and maloya). It has led to participation of national and international artists.

== See also ==
- Ralé-poussé
- Fonnkèr
