= Uhadi musical bow =

Southern African musical instrument

The uhadi, a musical bow, is a traditional Southern African Xhosa musical instrument. It is a large unembraced musical bow which is attached to a resonator and played by percussion. The length of the string bow ranges from 115 to 130 centimeters. Similar musical bows in Southern Africa include the thomo in Sotho music and the ugubhu in Zulu music.

== History ==
The earliest description of the use of the uhadi among the isiXhosa was in 1815 by the scholar James Campbell: 'The women have a calabash hung to a bow string, on which they beat and sing in harmony with the beating. The words they use are the names of friends, rivers and places they can recollect, having no songs.' Although this description was inaccurate, as it did not describe the strings, it was most likely describing the uhadi musical bow as there is no evidence of any other Xhosa musical bow using a calabash as resonator. Traditionally the uhadi musical bow is an instrument which was mostly played by married women however, occasionally men and children play it. Most Uhadi players learn through observing other uhadi players.

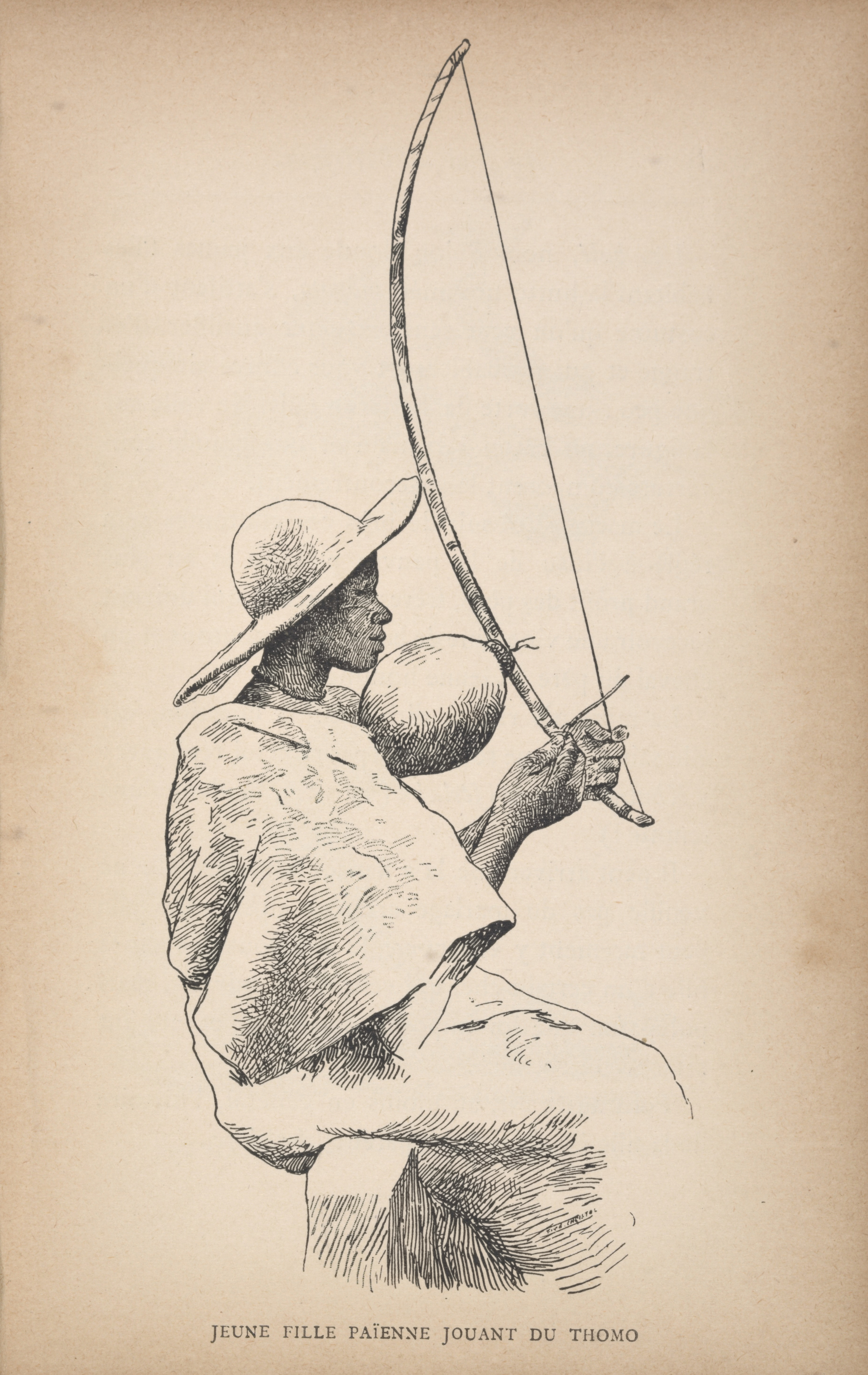
The 'thomo' musical bow used by the Basotho people.

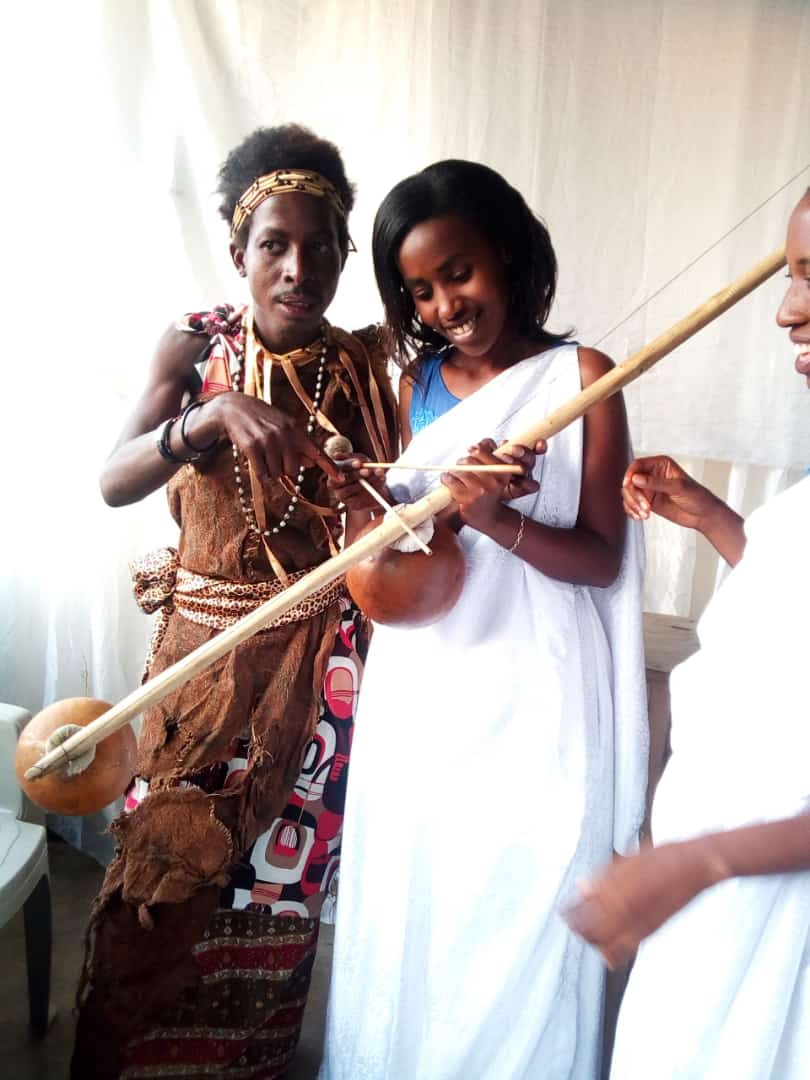
The Umuduri musical bow used in Burundi and Rhwanda is similar to the Uhadi.

Two bows in which the resonator is a gourd, attached to the instrument's center and pressed into the musician's chest or stomach. Both are sounded with a stick.

== Characteristics ==
The materials used to create the Uhadi have changed over time.

=== Stave ===
One of the early choices of wood in making the stave or 'injikwe' in isiXhosa were from a tree called the 'umbangandlela'. It was later made by a bush called 'uliza' which grows in abundance on the mountainsides of the Eastern Cape in South Africa. The bush is described to be similar to the hazel bush which has long straight stems without any nuts. The wood of the tree is cut while it is still green and stripped of the external dry bark. The length of the stave is made by measuring the wood in relation to the arm of the particular player. The wood is then forced into a curved shape by forcing the ends into an inward direction and secured in this position by means of stringing.

=== The string ===
Before the 20th century, the string or 'usinga' in isiXhosa was originally made from a length of animal gut or hair. Artists of the 20th century like Nofinishi Dywili made bowstrings from the twisted wires of the bangles that the women wore on their ankles. The bangle was heated on the fire and stretched out to be used for the bow. By the 21st century, Xhosa people started making the strings out of brass wire.

=== The resonator ===
The resonator is made from uselwa which is a growing calabash that is harvested when green and allowed to dry out. A hole is made on one surface where the stalk would be attached approximately 7-9mm wide. The seeds are removed, and the inner walls of the gourd are scraped with a stick to remove all residue. The gourd is left to dry for at least two days. After the guard has dried out two small holes are made in the center of the gourd, in the area directly opposite the opening in it. To make the insulating pad, a piece of soft cloth is folded into a square shape. Another narrow strip of cloth is twisted into a thin rope or 'string', and this is passed through the two small holes in the gourd, so that the two ends hang loose, and are available for securing the gourd and the insulating pad to the bow stave.

=== The beater ===
The beater is called umqungu in isiXhosa, and is made from the tambookie grass, or umfuqa.

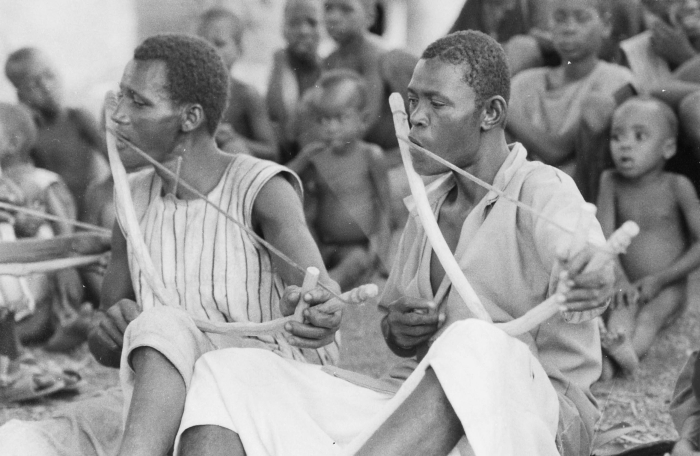
An example of a traditional African musical bow

== Technique ==
The open string is either beaten or pinched (which raises the pitch) with a scraped stick or reed. The Uhadi player holds the opening in the calabash towards their chest, opening or closing the hole by moving the calabash away from or towards the chest. A more open hole with a larger distance from the chest creates higher audible sounds. When the calabash is pressed directly to the chest, the overtones are damped. The player usually adjusts their clothing so that the gourd opening faces, and comes into contact with the bare flesh on or above the breast. This is done to ensure that the full resonance of the amplified partials which would otherwise be compromised by clothing.

== Uses ==
The Uhadi is played for traditional ceremonies including weddings and varies rite of passage ceremonies. Uhadi performances customarily take place in the afternoons and evenings, usually indoors.

There are very few uhadi players in the 21st century, however, acclaimed African musicians like Madosini and Dizu Plaatjies have made uhadi playing an essential aspect of their musical repertoires.

Contemporary uhadi players write and create their own songs; however, traditional ritual songs are not changed out of respect for their ritual significance.

== See also ==
- Musical bow
- Nofinishi Dywili
- Imbongi (Xhosa praise poet)
- Kalumbu of Zambia and Zimbabwe
- Berimbau of Brazil
- Malunga of India
- Belembaotuyan of Guam
