= List of people from Réunion =

This is a list of prominent people from Réunion, an Indian Ocean island that is an overseas department and region of France.

== Artists ==
- Serge Huo-Chao-Si, artist, designer, engineer

== Musicians ==
- Ann O'aro
- Baster
- Célimène Gaudieux
- Gérald De Palmas
- Olivier Ker Ourio
- Ravan'
- Kamal Krishna Baral
- Sabiah
- Tonton David
- Tess
- Ziskakan, musical group

== Poets ==
- Évariste de Forges de Parny
- Léon Dierx
- Boris Gamaleya
- Charles Marie René Leconte de Lisle

== Politicians ==
- Huguette Bello, politician
- Ibrahim Dindar, politician
- Jean-Claude Fruteau, politician
- Margie Sudre, politician
- Paul Vergès, regional president
- Roland Robert, politician

== Writers ==
- Michel Houellebecq, novelist
- Charles Marie René Leconte de Lisle
- Yves Manglou
- Jean-Régis Ramsamy
- Ambroise Vollard
- Julie Bernard

== Other notable people ==
- Keiiti Aki, professor, seismologist, author and mentor
- Edmond Albius, horticulturalist
- Gilbert Aubry, Bishop of St-Denis
- Joseph Bédier, academic and member of the Académie française (born in Paris to Réunionnais parents, raised on the island)
- Jeremy Flores, professional surfer
- Roland Garros, war hero
- Yoël Armougom
- Georges Guibert, Bishop of St-Denis
- Pauline Hoarau, model
- Claudia Carpentier, model
- Dimitri Payet, footballer
- Jacques Payet, world-renowned aikido master
- Manu Payet, comedian and radio host
- Florent Sinama Pongolle, footballer
- Laurent Robert, footballer
- Ludovic Ajorque
- Bao Vang (Yves Claude Vinh-San), son of Emperor Duy Tân
- Georginio Rutter, footballer
- Melvine Malard, footballer
