= Dende =

Dende may refer to:

- Dende (Dragon Ball), a character in Dragon Ball media
- Dende, a musical instrument used by children in Botswana, similar to the kalumbu in Zimbabwe
- Dende, a place in Nyanga Province, Gabon

== People with the surname ==
- Cornelian Dende (1915-1996), Polish-American priest

== See also ==
- Dende oil or palm oil
