= Music of Burundi =

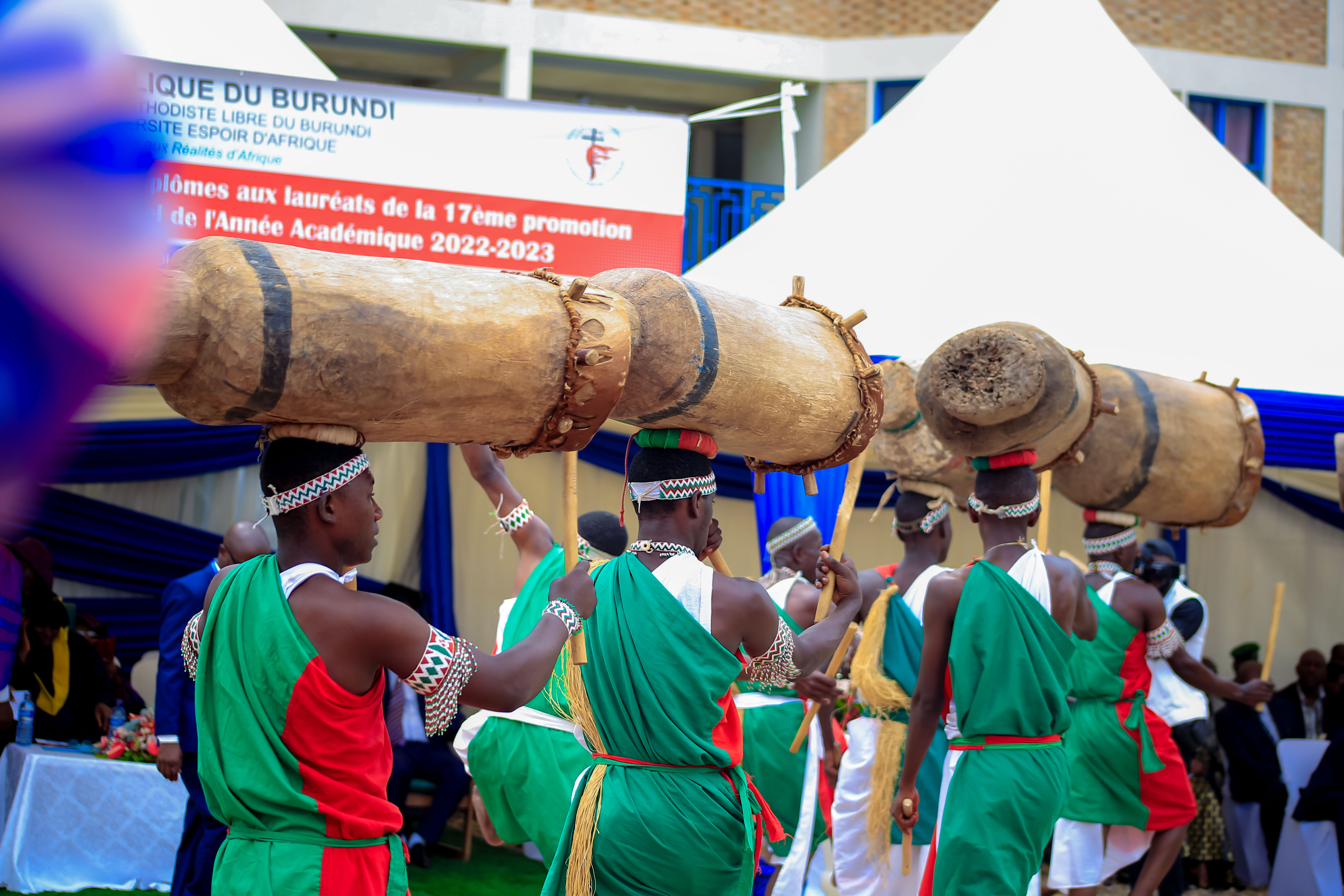
Drums of Burundi

Burundi is a Central African nation that is closely linked with Rwanda, geographically, historically and culturally. The drum such as the karyenda is one of central importance. Internationally, the country has produced the music group Royal Drummers of Burundi.

Burundian-Belgian musicians like Éric Baranyanka from the Burundese royal family, Ciza Muhirwa and, especially, Khadja Nin, have more recently gained prominence. Since the music is from the mind and soul, it mainly expresses what the people in Burundi feel and what they think when they beat the drums.

== Instruments ==
One feature of Burundian men's folk songs is the presence of an inanga, a type of stringed zither.

Burundian women greet each other in an interlocking rhythmic vocal form called akazehe.

Other instruments include:

- Ingoma drums, made from tree trunks
- The umwironge, a type of flute usually made from the stem of an intomvu plant
- The igihuha, a horn made from antelope horn
- The ikinyege, a rattle made from a gourd of the igicuma plant
- The iyebe, a rattle with threaded, dried, hollowed-out inyege fruit pods
- The inzogera, a closed bell classified as an idiophone, similar to the amayugi
- The umudende, a narrow cylindrical bell formed by bending a thin iron sheet into a narrow cylinder, with a hook of metal attached at top
- The ikembe, technically a lamellaphone consisting of a series of iron lamellae fixed to a rectangular wooden soundbox
- The indingiti, a stringed instrument classified as a fiddle
- The idono, a musical bow consisting of a string (umurya) supported by a flexible wooden string bearer or bow (umuheto)
- The umuduri, a musical bow consisting of a string supported by a flexible wooden string bearer or bow that is 125–135 cm in length.

== Burundi beat ==
The so-called diverse Burundi beat, filled with distinctive drumming created by Burundi's tribal musicians and recorded by French anthropologists, was used to create unique music by English pop bands Adam and the Ants and Bow Wow Wow.
