= Célimène (name) =

Célimène is a feminine given name.

People with this name include:

- Célimène, character in the play The Misanthrope
- Célimène Daudet (born 1977), French-Haitian pianist
- Célimène Gaudieux (1807–1864), French musician and innkeeper
