= Ann O'aro =

Réunionnais singer

- Birth name: Anne-Gaëlle Hoarau
- Born: 1990; Saint-Paul, Réunion
- Genres: maloya
- Occupation(s): Writer and musician
- Instruments: vocals; piano; organ; flute

Anne-Gaëlle Hoarau (born 1990), best known by her stage name Ann O'aro, is a musician and writer from Réunion. She is noted for her contribution to contemporary fonnkèr, a Réunionese genre of oral poetry.

== Biography ==
Ann O'aro was born Anne-Gaëlle Hoarau in Tan Rouge, Lieu-dit of Saint-Paul, Réunion, in 1990. Fleeing an abusive childhood home, she left the island for four years after finishing school and spent time in Paris and Quebec.

A musician and dancer since childhood, playing piano, organ and flute, O'aro began writing as well after returning to Tan Rouge. Writing in Réunion Creole, she produced works of autobiographical poetry, specializing in the oral poetry of Réunion known as fonnkèr. Her work has frequently dealt with violence against women in Réunion, including the incest she experienced during her own childhood at the hands of her abusive father, who died by suicide when she was 15. Her poetry is often set to maloya music, although she also performs a cappella or with just percussive backing.

After being discovered by Philippe Conrath, who manages fellow fonnkèr artists Danyèl Waro and Zanmari Baré, O'aro released a self-titled album in 2018. It received critical acclaim from such publications as Télérama, with one critic writing that "Ann O’Aro is the sound of Réunion itself." The Académie Charles Cros awarded the album its Coup de Coeur Francophone award in 2019. She toured France and Réunion with Danyèl Waro in 2019 and 2020.

In 2019, O'aro published a bilingual French-Réunion Creole collection of poetic dialogues, titled Saplë lo shien - Cantique de la meute. The following year, she released her second album, Longoz.
