= Berimbau =

Traditional Brazilian musical bow

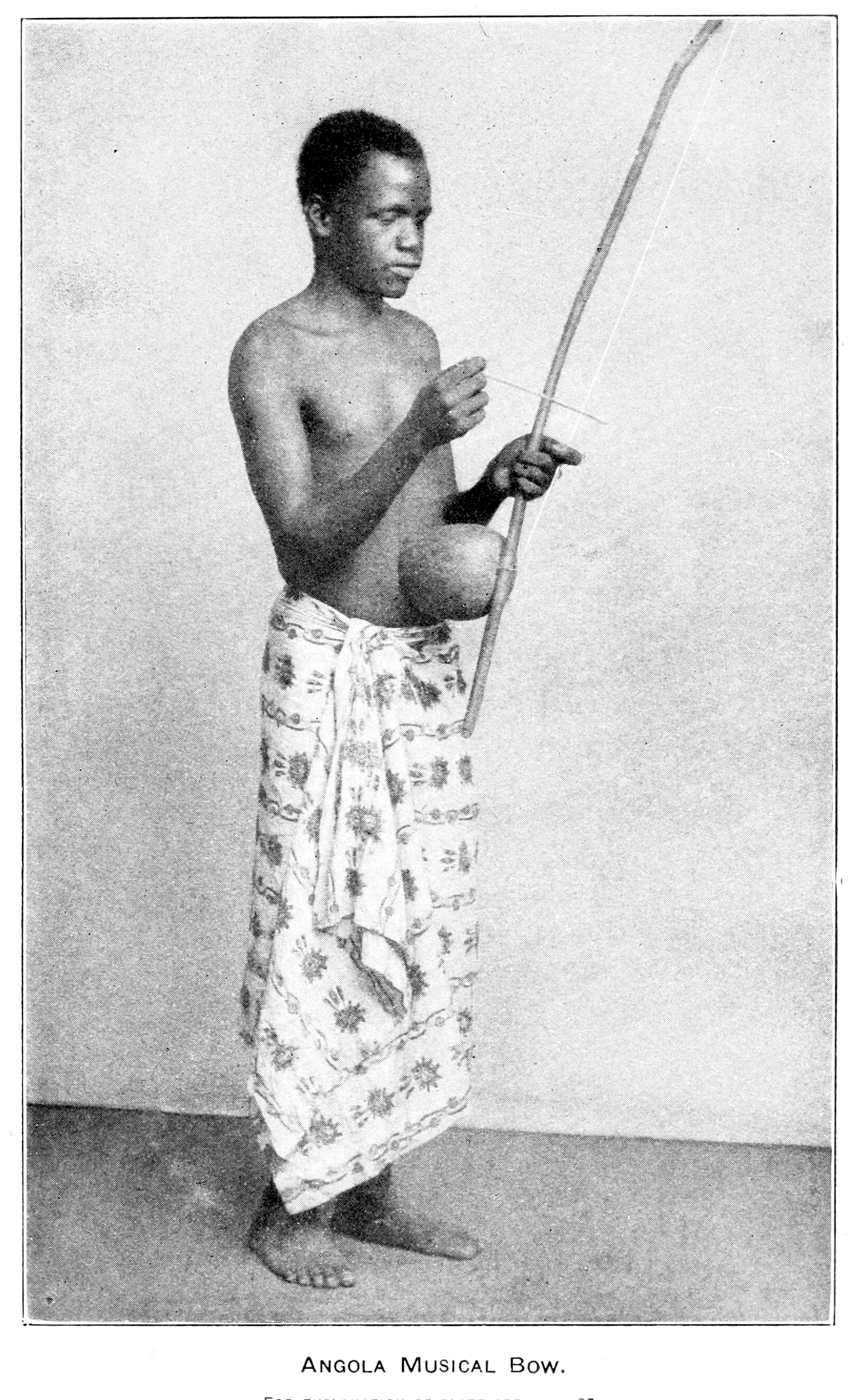
- Angolan musical bow (1922), known as berimbau in Brazil.
- Other names: urucungo, madimba lungungu
- Classification: percussion instrument and musical bow

Related instruments
- Belembaotuyan, Benta, Bobre, Diddley bow, Kalumbu, Malunga, Quijongo, Uhadi, Washtub bass

Sound sample
- An unaccompanied berimbau

The berimbau (Portuguese pronunciation: [beɾĩˈbaw], borrowed from Kimbundu mbirimbau) is a traditional Angolan musical bow that is commonly used in Brazil. It is also known as sekitulege among the Baganda and Busoga. It consists of a single-stringed bow attached to a gourd resonator and is played with a stick and a coin or stone to create different tones and rhythms. The berimbau was used in many parts of Africa and Brazil during the 19th century to accompany chants and storytelling. It is part of the candomblé tradition, later incorporated into the Afro-Brazilian art capoeira. Until the mid-20th century, it was used almost exclusively within the black community, but after the popularization of capoeira, it gained wider popularity. Today, berimbau is used in various genres of popular music.

== History ==
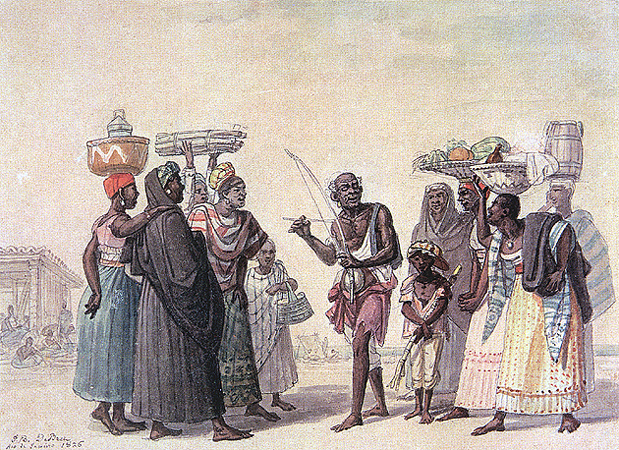
An old african urucungo player, by Debret (1826). He wrote that "often one of the slaves, missing his homeland, let out his voice and sang in the public squares and around the fountains."

Berimbau is an adaptation of African gourde musical bows, as no Indigenous Brazilian or European people use musical bows. According to the musicologist Gerard Kubik, the berimbau and the "southwest Angolan variety called mbulumbumba are identical in construction and playing technique, as well as in tuning and in a number of basic patterns played." The assimilation of this Angolan instrument is evident also in other Bantu terms used for musical bow in Brazilian Portuguese, including urucungo, and madimba lungungu.

In 1859, French journalist Charles Ribeyrolles described free practices of African slaves on a plantation in Rio de Janeiro province, linking the berimbau to the batuque:

Saturday evening, after the last working task of the week, and on holidays that give idleness and rest, the blacks have an hour or two of the evening for dancing. They assemble in their terreiro, calling, gathering and inciting each other, and the celebration starts. Here it is the capoeira, a kind of Pyrrhic dance, with daring combat evolutions, regulated by the Congo drum; there it is the batuque, with its cold or indecent postures which the urucungo, viola with thin cords, accelerates or contains; further away it is a frenzied dance where the gaze, the breasts and the hips provoke. It is a kind of inebriated convulsion one calls the lundu.

The berimbau first appeared as an instrument accompanying capoeira in the early 20th century in Bahia. The berimbau slowly came to replace the drum as the central instrument for the capoeira game, which it is now famous for and widely associated with.

== As a weapon ==
Mestre Pastinha recalls that the capoeiristas during the prohibition used to attach a double-edged sickle to the instrument, turning it into a deadly weapon when necessary: "In the moment of truth it would cease to be a musical instrument and would turn into a hand sickle." Mestre Noronha also claimed that the berimbau was a very useful weapon to the old capoeira masters of the 1920s who resisted police repression. The berimbau was used as a weapon either with one end sharpened or by attaching a blade to one end, making it the capoeira's longest-range weapon.

The practice of hiding weapons inside musical instruments dates back to at least the early 19th century. On November 16, 1832, the police inspector in Rio reported that capoeiras conceal spears and weapons in marimbas and sugarcane pieces.

== Design ==
Parts of a berimbau

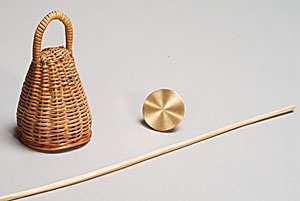
A caxixi, baqueta, and dobrão

The berimbau consists of a wooden bow (verga – traditionally made from biribá wood, which grows in Brazil), about 4 to 5 feet (1.2 to 1.5 metres) long, with a steel string (arame – often pulled from the inside of an automobile tire) tightly strung and secured from one end of the verga to the other. A calabash gourd (cabaça), dried, opened and hollowed-out, attached to the lower portion of the verga by a loop of tough string, acts as a resonator.

Starting in the 1950s, Brazilian berimbaus were painted in bright colors, following local Brazilian taste; today, most makers follow the tourist consumer's quest for (faux) authenticity, and use clear varnish and discreet decoration.

To play the berimbau, one holds it in one hand, wrapping the two middle fingers around the verga, and placing the little finger under the cabaça's string loop (the anel), and balancing the weight there. A small stone or coin (pedra or dobrão) is held between the index and thumb of the same hand that holds the berimbau. The cabaça is rested against the abdomen. In the other hand, one holds a stick (baqueta or vaqueta – usually wooden, very rarely made of metal) and a shaker (caxixi). One strikes the arame with the baqueta to produce the sound. The caxixi accompanies the baqueta. The dobrão is moved back and forth from the arame to change the pitch produced by the berimbau. The sound can also be altered by moving the cabaça back and forth from the abdomen, producing a wah-like sound.

Parts and accessories of the berimbau:

- Verga: wooden bow that makes up the main body of the Berimbau
- Arame: steel string
- Cabaça: opened, dried and hollowed out gourd-like fruit secured to the lower portion of the berimbau, used to amplify and resonate the sound

Calling the cabaça a gourd is technically a mistake. As far as Brazilian berimbaus are concerned, the fruit used for the berimbau's resonator, while still known in Brazil as cabaça ("gourd"), it is not technically a gourd (family Cucurbitaceae); instead, it is the fruit of an unrelated species, the tree Crescentia cujete (family Bignoniaceae), known in Brazil as calabaça, cueira, cuia, or cabaceira.

- Pedra or Dobrão: small stone or coin pressed against the arame to change the tone of the berimbau
- Baqueta: small stick struck against the arame to produce the sound
- Caxixi: small rattle that optionally accompanies the baqueta in the same hand

Capoeiristas split berimbaus in three categories:

- Gunga (others say Berra-boi): lowest tone
- Médio (others say Viola): medium tone
- Viola (Violinha if the medium tone is Viola): highest tone

These categories relate to sound, not to size. The berimbau's quality does not depend on the length of the verga or the size of the gourd, rather on the diameter and hardness of the verga's wood and the quality of the cabaça.

== Sound ==
Making the three sounds of a berimbau. A: buzz sound. B: high sound. C: open string sound.

The berimbau, as played for capoeira, basically has three sounds: the open string sound, the high sound, and the buzz sound.

- In playing the buzz sound, one holds easily the gourd closed against one's belly, while touching the string with the dobrão. A muted "tch" sound emerges.
- To play the open string sound, one strikes the string less than an inch up from the gourd string, with the bow balanced on the little finger so that the gourd is opened. One can grossly tune the open sound, by loosening the arame, and by sliding the gourd a little up or down from the place where the sound is best.
- To produce the high sound, one must hold the bow in the same way, gourd opened, and forcefully press the dobrão on the string. The sound differs from the low sound in tone and in timbre. Old recordings and musicians report that the difference in tone used to be about 1 tone (the interval from C to D). One can press the dobrão away enough from the gourd for this only if the bow is about 4 feet (1.2 m) to 4 feet 2 inches (122 to 127 cm); that was the length of the bows in the 1940s and 1950s. Today, many berimbaus are overgrown to 5 feet (150 cm), and tuning options are limited in berimbau ensembles.

Other sounds may appear in a berimbau performance, but only these define capoeira's rhythmic patterns (except Iuna).

Closing and opening the gourd while the string resounds produces a wah-wah effects, which depends on how large the gourd opening is. Whether this effect is desirable or not is a matter of controversy. Pressing the dobrão after striking the string is a widely used technique; so is closing neatly the gourd while the string resounds to shut off the sound. A specific toque requires the open string sound with closed gourd. Musicians use whatever sound they may get out of the string. It is not often considered bad practice to strike other parts of the instrument. As with most aspects of playing the berimbau, the names of the techniques differ from teacher to teacher. Most teachers, and most students, worry more about producing a nice sound than about naming the individual sounds.

Of course, the strength (velocity, accent) with which one lets the baqueta hit the string is paramount to rhythm quality. The open sound is naturally stronger (meaning that, for a constant-strength strike, the other two sound weaker), but the musician may decide which strikes to stress. Also, the sound tone shifts a little with the strength of the strike, and some sophisticated toques make use of this.

== In capoeira music ==
Whatever style the berimbaus call, the capoeirista must play, no matter if it is fast, slow, a fight, or only a playful game.

— Mestre Acordeon

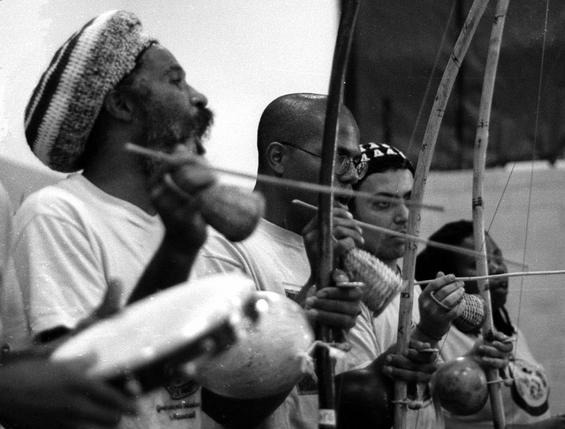
Three berimbau players playing the rhythm for a capoeira in Baltimore, MD, featuring Mestre Cobra Mansa

In capoeira, the berimbau commands the roda, the circle where capoeiristas engage in the game, and by extension, the game itself. The music required from the berimbau is essentially rhythmic. Most of the patterns, or toques, derive from a single basic structure. Capoeira musicians produce many variations upon the basic pattern. They give names to known variations, and when such a named variation occurs repeatedly while playing, they call what they are playing by the name of that variation. The most common names are "Angola" and "São Bento Grande". There is much talking about the meaning of these terms.

In capoeira Angola, three Berimbaus play together. Each berimbau holds a position in relation to the "roda":

- The gunga plays "Angola" and is most commonly played by a mestre or the highest grade capoeirista around. Depending on the style of the group and the personality of the individual, the gunga may improvise a lot or stick strictly to the main rhythm. The person playing the gunga at the beginning of a roda is often the leader of the roda and the other instruments follow as well. The gunga player may also lead the singing, which is made easier by the simple rhythm and little variation that he plays. The gunga is used to call players to the pé-do-berimbau (foot of the berimbau, where players enter the game).
- The médio plays "Sao Bento Pequeno". For instance, while the gunga may play a simple, eight-unit pattern like (xxL.H.H.), the viola (or médio) can play a sixteen-unit variation, like (xxL.xLHL|.xL.H.H.). The dialog between gunga and viola (or médio) gives the toque its character. In the context of capoeira Angola, the médio inverts the gunga's melody (Angola toque): (xxL.H...) by playing São Bento Pequeno: (xxH.L...) with moderate improvisation.
- The viola plays "Sao Bento Grande". Mostly variations and improvisations. It may be described as the "lead guitar" of the "bateria".

Tuning in capoeira is also loosely defined. The berimbau is a microtonal instrument and while one can be tuned to play a major or minor 2nd, the actual tone is approximately a neutral second lying between a whole and half tone.

The berimbaus may be tuned to the same pitch, differing only in timbre. More commonly, low note of the médio is tuned in unison to the high note of the Gunga, and likewise for the viola to the médio. Others like to tune the instruments in 4ths (C, F, B flat) or a triad (C, E, G). Any tuning is acceptable provided it sounds good to the master's ear.

There are countless different rhythms or toques played on the berimbau.

=== Toques ===
Common toques names are:

- Angola: rests on (does not play) the last beat of the basic leaving (xxL.H...)
- São Bento Pequeno de Angola Invertido: similar to Angola but with the high and low tones reversed (xxH.L...). São Bento Pequeno is typically played on Médio in conjunction with Angola on the Gunga.
- São Bento Grande: adds an extra hit to São Bento Pequeno, (xxH.L.L.)
- São Bento Grande da Regional (or São Bento Grande de Bimba): an innovation of Mestre Bimba, is often played in the two-bar pattern (xxL.xxH.|xxL.L.H.)
- Toque de Iúna: introduced to capoeira by Mestre Bimba. (L-L-L-L-L-xxL-L.) (the '-' = touching the dobrão to the arame without hitting).
- Cavalaria: in the past, used to warn Capoeiristas of the approach of police. (L.xxL.xxL.xxL.H.) is one example; variations exist.

In notating the toques, it is a convention to begin with the two buzzed tones; however, it is worthwhile to note that they are pickups to the downbeat, and would more properly be transcribed: xx(L.H...xx)

São Bento Grande, as played in a regional setting, places the main stress or downbeat at the final L so that it sounds: (L.xxH.L.|L.xxH.L.L)

Other toques include Idalina: (L.L.x.H.|xxL.L.H.), Amazonas: (xxLLxxLH|xxLLLLLH), Banguela: (xxL.H.H.), all deriving from the basic capoeira pattern. The toque called "Santa Maria" is a four-bar transcription of the corridos "Santa Maria" and "Apanha Laranja no Chão Tico Tico". (xxL.LLL.|xxL.LLH.|xxH.HHH.|xxH.LHL.)

Capoeiristas also play samba, before or after capoeira, with the proper toques, deriving from the samba de roda rhythmic pattern: (xxH.xxH.xx.H.HH.)

== In popular music ==
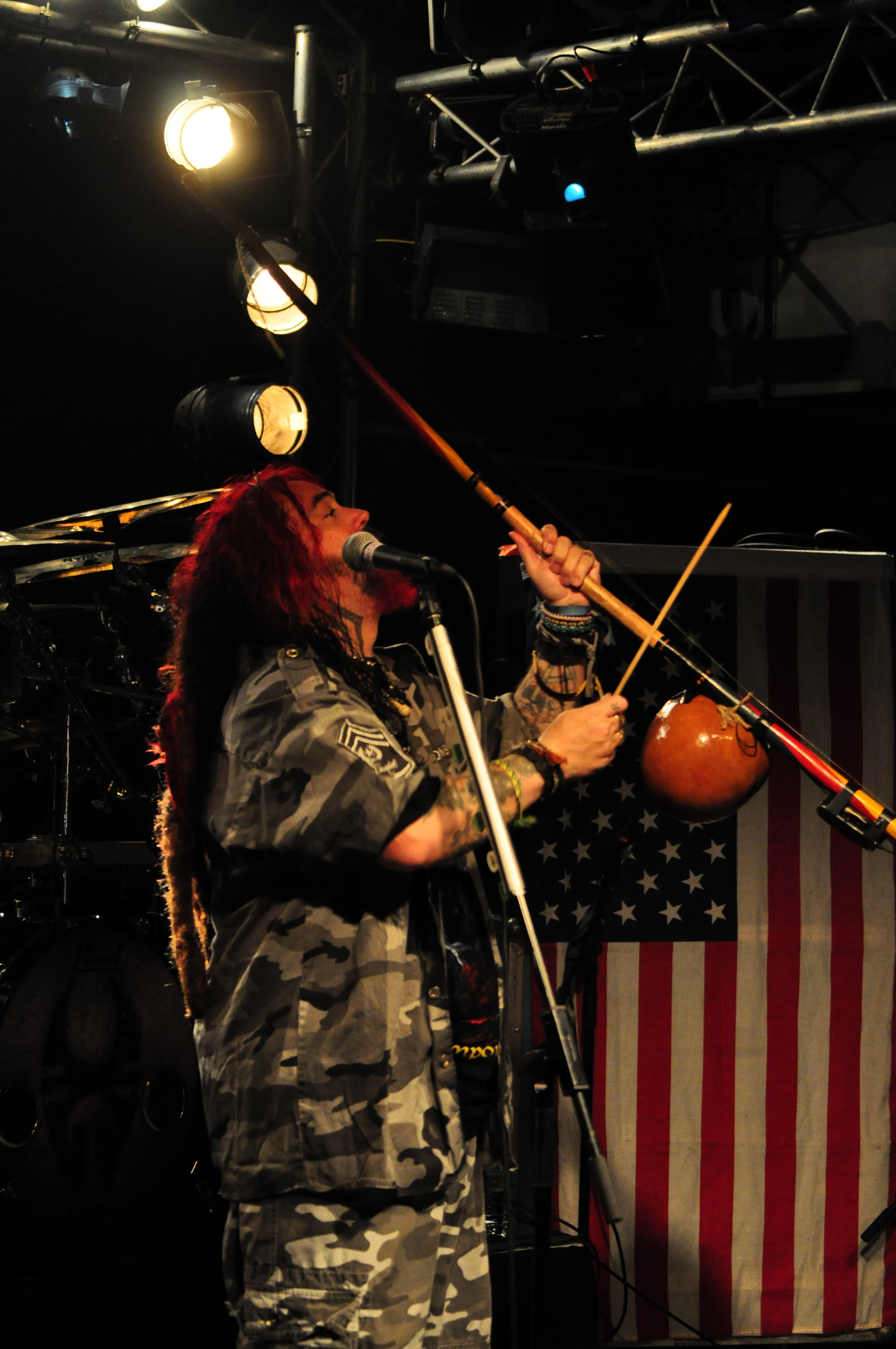
Max Cavalera playing berimbau, 2012.

- Frank Colón, an American percussionist and composer, nick-named throughout Europe as "Berimbau Man".
- Electronic artist Bibio makes use of the berimbau on the track "K Is For Kelson", the first single from his 2011 album Mind Bokeh.
- Nana Vasconcelos played berimbau and other percussion instruments with modern jazz musicians worldwide.
- Max Cavalera, the lead singer and guitarist in metal bands Sepultura, Soulfly and Cavalera conspiracy, uses a berimbau in several songs.
- Airto Moreira – Brazilian percussionist; works with many musicians and combines many styles from different continents
- Okay Temiz – Turkish jazz drummer and percussionist used berimbau in many songs, the most famous of which is "Denizalti Rüzgarlari" from 1975.
- Cut Chemist, turntablist of such groups as Ozomatli and Jurassic 5, made use of the berimbau in his single "The Garden".
- TaKeTiNa – The berimbau is used as a drone, along with the surdo, which serves as the "heartbeat", as part of the TaKeTiNa Rhythm Process, a musical, meditative group process for people who want to develop their awareness of rhythm.
- Minnesota metal band GRYZOR uses a modern contemporary version of the berimbau in their live show.
- Mauro Refosco, a Brazilian percussionist, plays the berimbau in the live rendition of the Atoms' "The Clock".
- Mickey Hart, percussionist for the Grateful Dead, played the berimbau on the song "Throwing Stones", as well as on several of his solo works.
- David Byrne's American Utopia Broadway musical and percussionists using berimbaus during multiple songs during the show.
- MC Levin, a Brazilian funk artist has used berimbau to blend its successful hit Ela Me Falou Que Quer Rave.
- Berimbaucomtudo is the musical project of Brazilian berimbau player Henrique Azul, focused on exploring the berimbau beyond capoeira, creating new contemporary sounds and styles.

== In popular culture ==
- In Tekken 8, Brazilian capoeira fighter, Eddy Gordo, can be seen in pre-fight intros playing a berimbau with a caxixi. Eddy also has a customisation option which places the berimbau on his back.
- In Street Fighter 6, Kenyan capoeira fighter Elena (Street Fighter), can also be seen playing a berimbau on the character select screen. During a fight, a berimbau can be heard when an emote is used.

== See also ==
- Capoeira music
- Musical bow
- Uhadi musical bow
- Kalumbu
- Malunga
- Belembaotuyan
- Gusle
