= ʻŪkēkē =

Musical bow made of wood

The ʻūkēkē is a musical bow made of wood, 16 to 24 inches (41 to 61 cm) long and about 1.5 inches (3.8 cm) wide with two or three strings fastened through and around either end, tuned to an A major triad. Prior to the introduction of steel strings, gut or sennit (coconut fibre) was used.

The strings are strummed with one's dominant hand while the other hand holds the ʻūkēkē in position. The mouth then acts as a resonating chamber, positioned behind the body of the instrument. Unlike the African stick zither and Berimbau:

The old experts made no sound with the vocal cords, but the mouth acted as a resonance chamber. The resulting sound suggested speech and trained persons could understand. It was sometimes used for love making.

The ʻūkēkē is the only stringed instrument indigenous to Hawaii, with other Hawaiian string instruments like the ukulele and slack-key guitar having originated as indigenous Hawaiian innovations of other string instruments introduced by European sailors and settlers.

== Modern usage ==
The 19th-century Hawaiian kumu hula ʻIoane ʻŪkēkē played the ʻūkēkē. Hawaiian artists such as Palani Vaughan and Ranga Pae have incorporated the ʻūkēkē into their compositions.

The instrument nearly went extinct due to the 20th century federal and state-sanctioned repression of Hawaiian musical expression until Mahi La Pierre's studies of old Hawaiian music resulted in a successful attempt to make one. His recreation of the instrument, and the Papahan Kuaola organization he founded, is now devoted to preserving the memory of the ʻūkēkē and its expressions of Hawaiian culture for future musicians to thrive on and bring back its use as a traditional accompaniment to not only the songs and celebrations in private but also in public life, such as at rituals, events, memorials, hulas, dances, and other cultural gatherings.

In the entire running history of the Merrie Monarch Festival, the ʻūkēkē has been incorporated into a choreography only once, in 2019. The entire hālau's membership crafted personal ʻūkēkē for use in their performance, at the direction and consultation of Mahi La Pierre.

Traditional ʻūkēkē music follows a standardized melodic tempo of 1-2, 1–2–3, 1-2-3-4

== Meaning of ʻūkēkē ==
In Hawaiian ʻūkēkē means to quiver, or alternatively 'crooked mouth', a possible reference to using the instrument with the mouth open as a resonance chamber, and sharing the same linguistic root as the name of the ‘akeke‘e, a Kauaʻi-native bird whose lower mandible is offset, resulting in a crooked-looking beak.

== Papahana Kuaola ==
Papahana Kuaola is a native Hawaiian project dedicated to preserving lifelong learning of Hawaiian history and tradition. This project is supported by the Institute of Museum and Library Services (IMLS). The goal is to provide activities for classrooms and people of all ages to connect to their heritage.

== ʻūkēkē sound ==
The steel strings of the ʻūkēkē are tuned to the three A major notes (A, C#, E). It was played in the evening so it could be properly heard in the quiet. The sound was labeled as devil music when two women playing the instrument to each other were first heard by a foreign missionary.

== Gallery ==
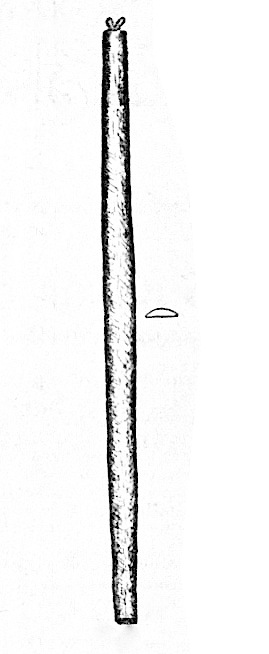
Illustration of an ʻūkēkē.

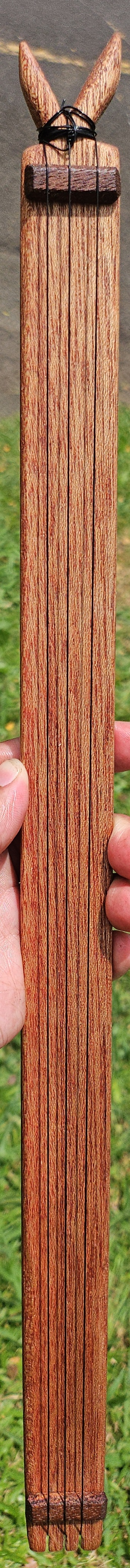
A tri-stringed mahogany-wood 'ūkēkē. The top side is sanded flat, while the obverse is rounded. Similar to a mouth-harp, the instrument is held up to one's mouth to use it as a resonance chamber and amplify the delicate sounds of the three strings.

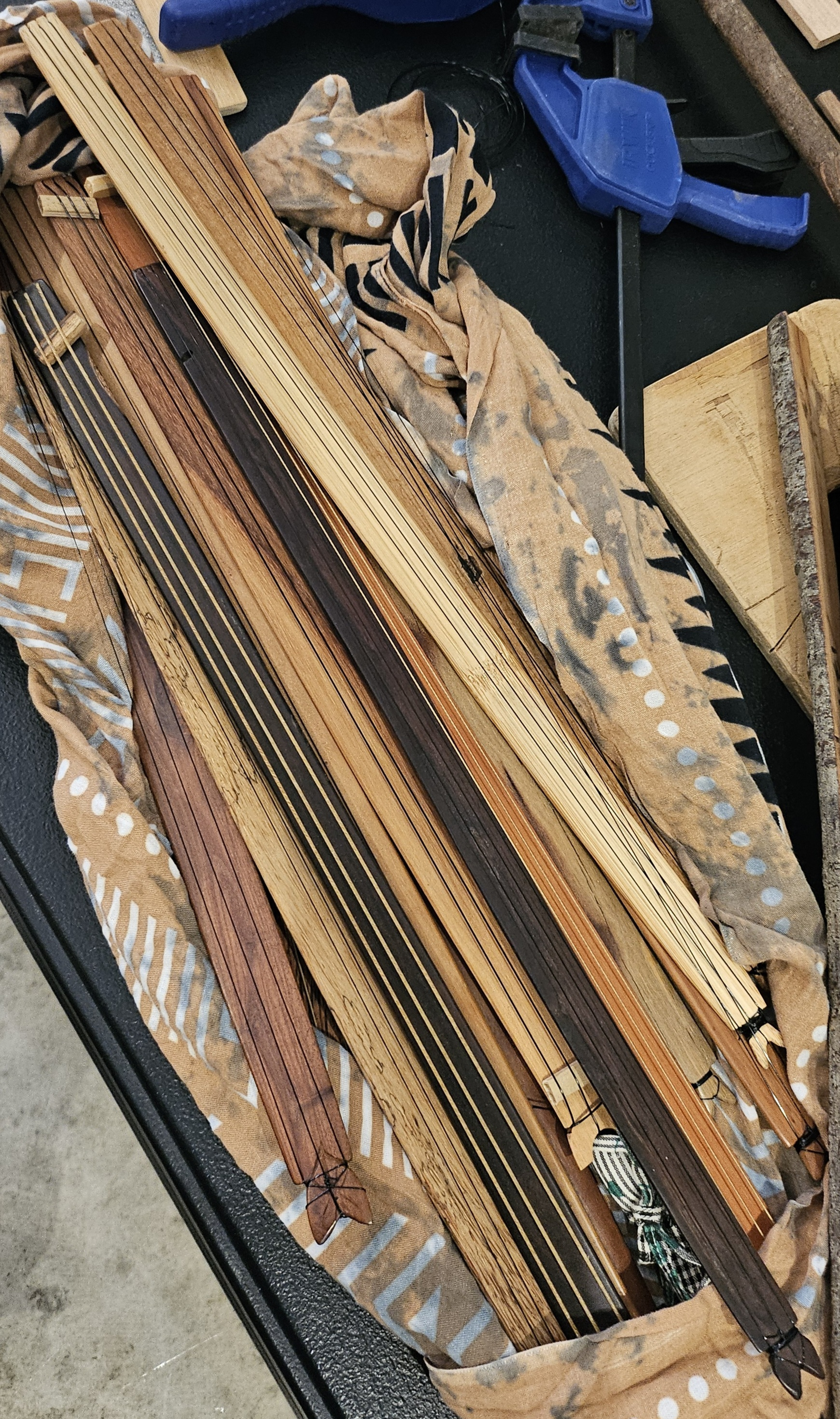
Multiple 'ūkēkē crafted by Mahi La Pierre. The base pitch and resonance of each instrument can differ widely depending on the string material used (whether steel, gut, or twine), the wood used (softwoods like koa or mahogany versus hardwoods like uhiuhi or sandalwood), the length of the body, and the tightness of the strings. Musicians may carry multiple 'ūkēkē for different occasions where certain variations are more fitting or impactful.
