= Umuduri =

Stringed instrument

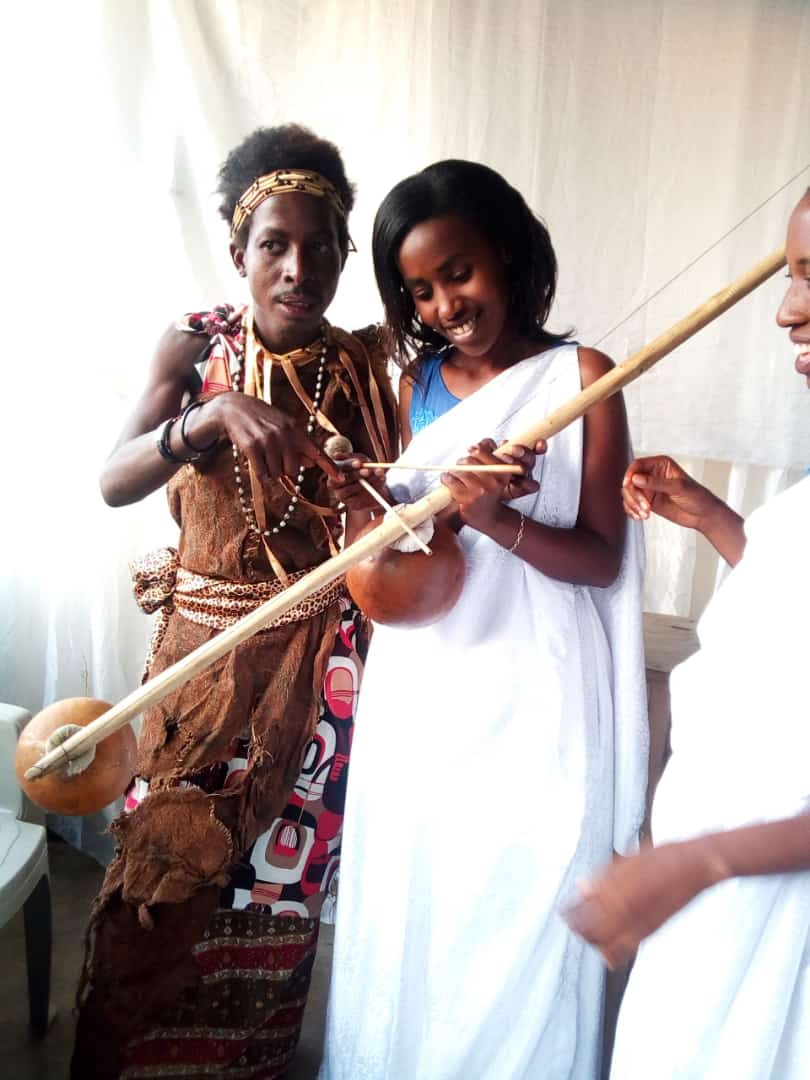
- Playing umuduri in Burundi

String Instrument
- Other names: Ibubura, Umunahi
- Classification: Chordophone
- Hornbostel–Sachs classification: 311.111 (Mono-idiochord musical bow)

Related instruments
- Berimbau

The umuduri is a Burundian and Rwandan stringed instrument. It is a musical bow consisting of a string supported by a flexible wooden string bearer or bow that is 125–135 cm in length. The string is traditionally made from plant fiber and animal gut, but the use of metal wire has become widespread.

== Construction and design ==
A gourd is attached to in the bow to act as a resonator. A wooden stick and the inzebe rattle are also used. Two loops bring the string closer to the bow, the third (attached to the gourd resonator by a cord) divides the string into two unequal lengths. This creates two different notes, usually a fourth or a fifth, as fundamental notes. To keep the resonator and the musical bow apart, a cloth or a pad of banana peel is placed between the two to ensure that there is no direct contact between the bow and the gourd that might interfere with production of sound.

== Playing technique ==
To play the instrument, the bow is held in the left hand vertically in front of the body and the gourd is pressed against the body. A thin stick, used to strike the string, and an inzebe rattle are held in the right hand. In addition to the two fundamental notes that the string produces, the upper (longer) part of the string can be shortened using the index or middle finger, resulting in three notes: second/fourth or fifth.

== Cultural significance ==
The umuduri is made by the Twa but used by the Hutu. Along with the ikembe, the umuduri was introduced to Rwanda in the early twentieth century. It is played at festivals and official ceremonies; such as the ikinimba, which is a dance accompanied by instruments to tell the stories of kings and heroes of Rwanda. It is played alone, without accompaniment, and is used throughout a variety of genres.

== See also ==
- Music of Rwanda
- Music of Burundi
