= Firmin Viry =

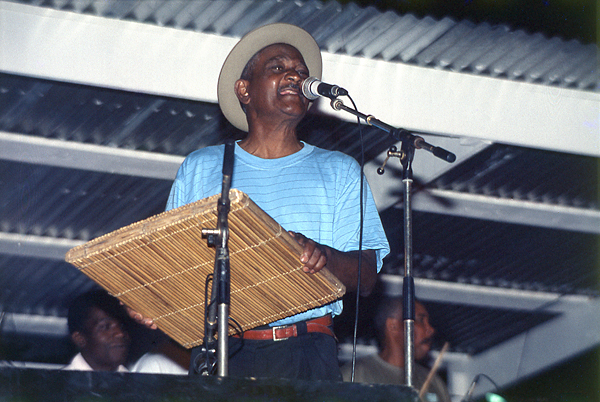

Background information
- Born: 11 March 1935 (age 90)
- Genres: Maloya

Firmin Viry (born 11 March 1935) is a singer from Réunion known for maloya music. He was born in the Ligne Paradis neighborhood of Saint-Pierre. Viry developed his musical talents while working in the sugar cane fields and fighting for the rights of fellow sugar-cane cutters.

== Early life and music ==
Firmin Viry worked as a sugar-cane cutter all his life between Saint-Pierre and Le Tampon. At 23, he made the instruments necessary for maloya, the bob, the roulèr, the kayamb, and the piker, thanks to Gustin Miza (a Mozambican).

== Activism ==
Close to the Réunion Communist Party at its foundation, Viry then proposed, according to Françoise Vergès, the first maloya sung and danced in public in 1959, at the Rio cinema in Saint-Denis. Firmin Viry led another relentless fight for the abolition of the ban on Maloya. When President François Mitterrand assumed power, he quickly lifted the ban.

== Controversy ==
In October 2009, Firmin Viry canceled the invitation for comedian Dieudonné to appear at the 20 December kabar to celebrate Réunion Freedom Day, during which Dieudonné was to present a preview of his film Sans forme de politesse: regard sur la mouvance Dieudonné. A Paris screening of the film had also been canceled after the mayor, Bertrand Delanoë, objected, following repeated complaints against the comedian that his shows and media comments displayed antisemitism. (Note: The title of Dieudonné's film is, in English, 'without any form of politeness: a look at the Dieudonné movement'. During his show J'ai fait le con, Dieudonné had brought Robert Faurisson, a promoter of Holocaust denial, on stage to award him "the prize of unacceptability and insolence" presented by an assisting comedian who was dressed as a Jewish deportee, all in front of Jean-Marie Le Pen and his wife.) At the time Viry withdrew his invitation, penalties of a fine and compensation payable to community groups were imposed on Dieudonné for "public insult of people of Jewish origin or faith"; similar incidents occurred in 2004 and 2005 for which Dieudonné also had judgements against him in 2007 and 2008.

== Discography ==
- 1972: A nous même danser Maloya, Disques Jackman, 45 RPM.
- 1976: Le maloya, Ediroi (PCR), 33 RPM.
- 1976: Peuple de la Réunion, peuple du maloya, Ediroi (PCR), 33 RPM. Participation of Firmin Viry with the troupe Résistance, the troupe Gaston Hoareau, and the troupe René Viry.
- 1977: Le Maloya de la Réunion, Disques Jackman, 45 RPM.
- 1983: Ti crie a moin anin / Dimanche grand matin, Disques Issa, 45 RPM.
- 1989: Cent An Boner, SEDM Oasis Studio, Cassette.
- 1998: Ti Mardé, Indigo.
- 1999: Ile de la Réunion: maloya, Ocora.
- 2006: Memwar in pep, Best Maloya.
- 2017: Maloya, Ocora.
