= Reinhard Flatischler =

Austrian musician

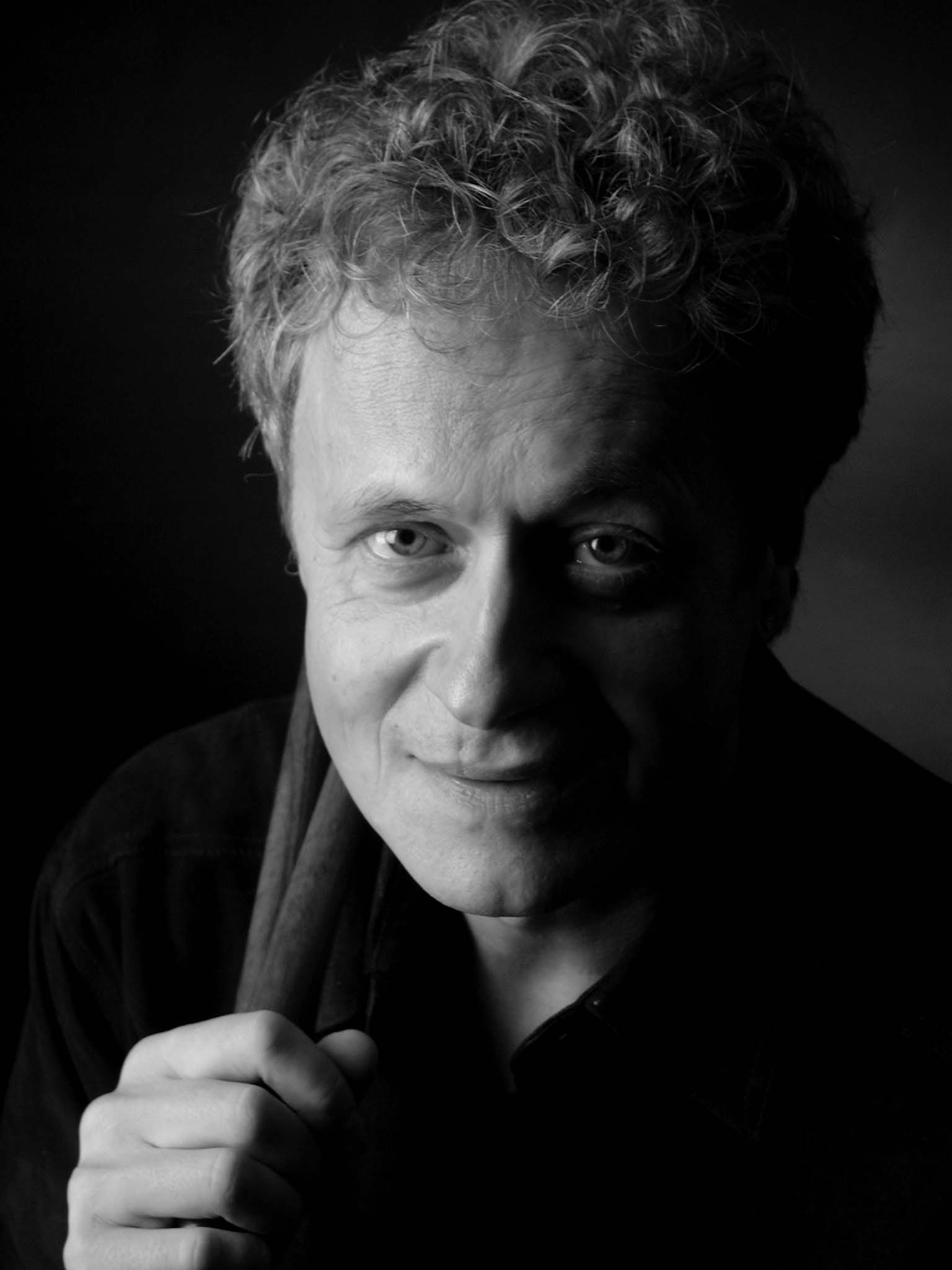

Background information
- Born: 1950 (age 74–75); Vienna, Austria

Reinhard Flatischler (born in Vienna, Austria, in 1950) is a musician and composer, founder of the TaKeTiNa Rhythm Process, and leader of the percussion group MegaDrums.

== Biography ==
Reinhard Flatischler was born in Vienna in 1950. He studied at the University of Music and Performing Arts, Vienna. He subsequently studied drums and percussion with master drummers from around the world. In 1970, Flatischler founded the TaKeTiNa Rhythm Process.

Flatischler is a member of the scientific committee of the International Society for Music in Medicine. He works with physicians and scientists to conduct research on the effects of the TaKeTiNa rhythm process. He co-directs a project exploring rhythm in pain therapy along with the president of the German Pain Association (DGS), Gerhard H. H. Mueller-Schwefe.

He was featured and appeared in the 1997 Manfred Waffender documentary film Herzschlag der Kontinente (Heartbeat of the Continents) with the Karnataka College of Percussion, Ramesh Shotham, and Mamady Keïta.

== TaKeTiNa ==
TaKeTiNa is a process that uses rhythmic movement and vocalization to develop rhythm and percussion skills, as well as relaxation, focus, perception, and self-confidence. The TaKeTiNa Process has been incorporated into pain and other medical therapy programs.

== Selective discography ==
- Reinhard Flatischler - Schinore (1987)
- MegaDrums - Coreana
- MegaDrums - Transformation (2002)
- MegaDrums - Ketu (1993)
- MegaDrums - Layers of Time (1996)
- MegaDrums - Terra Nova (2000)
- MegaDrums - The World is Full of Rhythm (1999)

== Books ==
- TaKeTiNa - Ur-Kraft Rhythmus. Junfermann Verlag Paderborn, 2009. ISBN 978-3-87387-722-1
- Die vergessene Macht des Rhythmus. TA KE TI NA. Der rhythmische Weg zur Bewußtheit, Synthesis, 1994. ISBN 3-922026-28-1
- Der Weg zum Rhythmus. Ta Ke Ti Na, Synthesis, 1993. ISBN 3-922026-48-6
- Rhythm for Evolution - das TaKeTiNa-Rhythmusbuch, Schott, Mainz, 2006. ISBN 3-7957-0539-8
- TaKeTiNa Die heilsame Kraft rhythmischer Urbewegungen, Irisiana, Random House, 2012, ISBN 978-3-424-15155-8
