= Danyèl Waro =

French musician (born 1955)

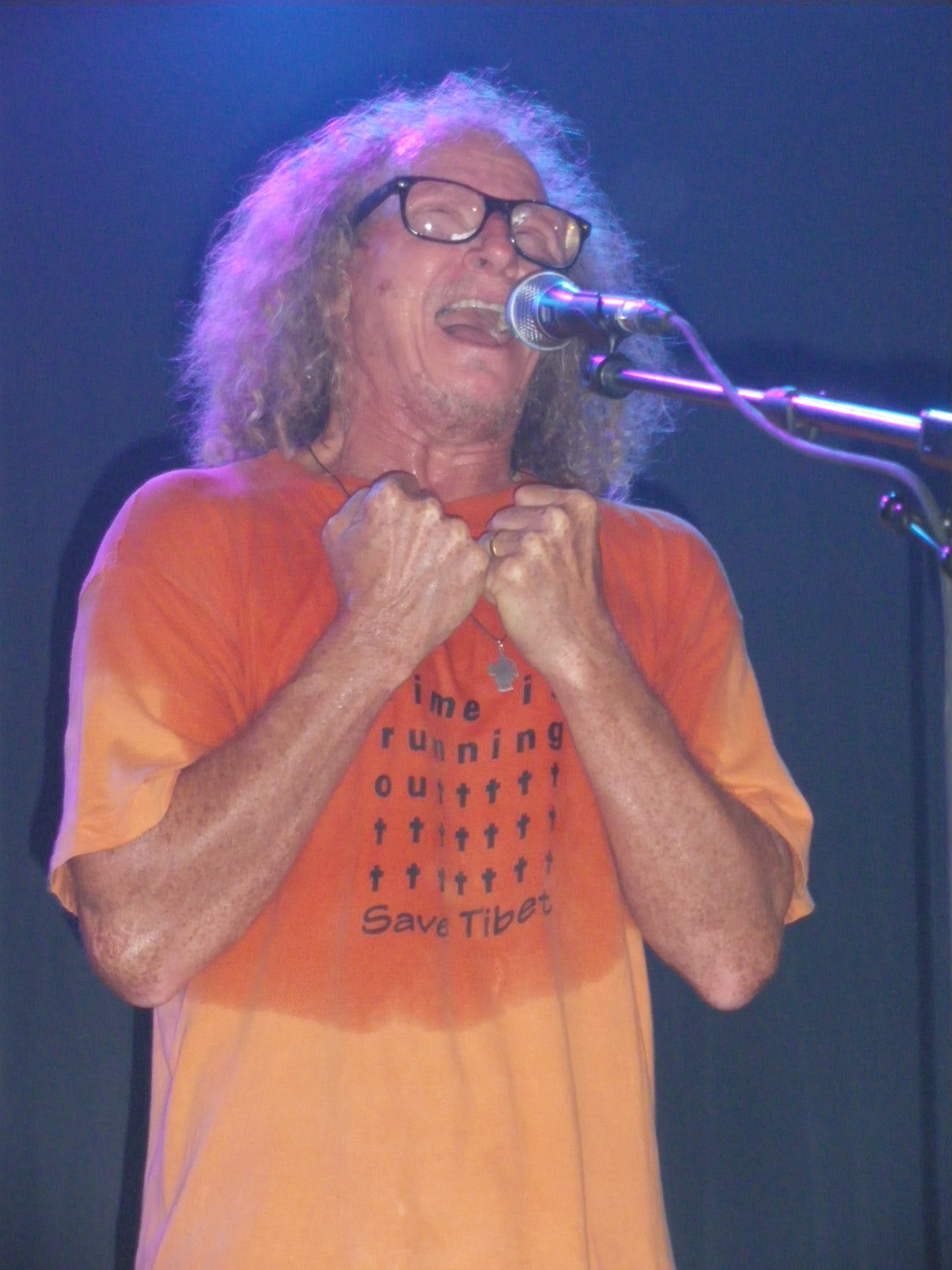
- Born: Daniel Hoareau; 10 May 1955; Le Tampon (France)
- Occupation: Musician, chansonnier, lyricist, politician
- Style: maloya

Daniel Hoareau (born 10 May 1955 in Le Tampon (Réunion, France), better known by his stage name Danyèl Waro, is a French musician, singer-songwriter and poet of Maloya.

== Biography ==
Danyèl Waro is a symbol of the revival of maloya music. Maloya, officially banned, was played by only a few people. He fell in love with this music during a Firmin Viry concert in 1970. Firmin became his mentor.

In 2010, Waro received a WOMEX Award, a prize awarded by world music professionals, in Copenhagen, during the WOMEX exposition.

== See also ==
- Fonnkèr
