= Ralé-poussé =

Musical instrument (diatonic accordion) of Réunion

The ralé-poussé is a diatonic accordion played on the island of Réunion in the southwest Indian Ocean. It is used to play Creole music of the 20th century.

The name refers to the "push-pull" motion of diatonic playing, which distinguishes the instrument's playing style as it rhythmically swaps between the "push" set of notes and "pull" set of notes.

== See also ==
- Music of Réunion
