= TaKeTiNa Rhythm Process =

Musical group process

The TaKeTiNa Rhythm Process is a musical meditative group process for people who want to develop their awareness of rhythm. It was developed in the 1970s by the Austrian musician and composer Reinhard Flatischler.

In a TaKeTiNa process, there are three different rhythmic layers—represented by the voice, claps, and steps—that continue simultaneously. Vocalization and clap rhythms, accompanied by the berimbau, constantly change while the steps, supported by a surdo drum, remain the same. The surdo stabilizes the basic rhythm of the steps, while call-and-response singing serves to destabilize and re-stabilize the rhythmic movements. In this process, the simultaneity of stabilization and destabilization creates a disturbance that allows participants to repeatedly fall out, and then fall back into rhythm. Participants are guided into the experience of "rhythm archetypes", rhythmic "images anchored deep in human consciousness". According to Flatischler, the support of the group allows the individual participant to go into his or her own process, building deep musical and personal trust.

TaKeTiNa is used in academic and clinical settings and in corporate trainings worldwide.
