= Yelatáj chos woley =

Musical bow of Wichi culture of Gran Chaco, Argentina

The yelatáj chos woley, yelataj chas woley or simply jelataj choz, is a musical bow which is characteristic of the Wichi culture in South American Gran Chaco.

== Features ==
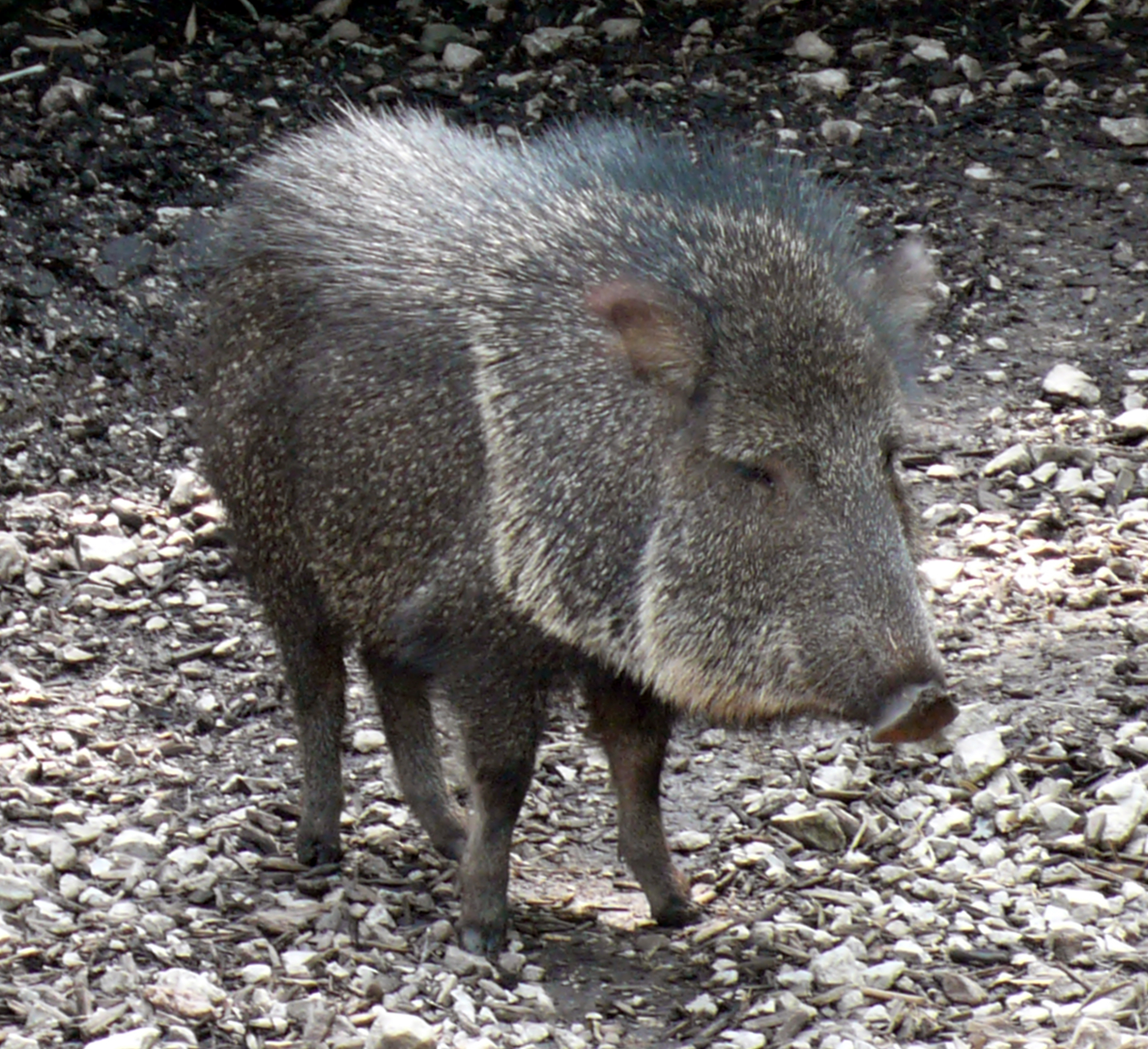
Chacoan peccary lives in Gran Chaco. Peccary hair was turned into bowstrings.

The Yelatáj chos woley consists of two bows of tusca wood. The performer holds the end of one of the bows between his teeth and rubs that bowstring with the other. The musician's mouth acts as a resonator. Originally the bowstrings were made from peccary hair, vegetable fibers or other hair. When horses arrived with the Spaniards to America, instrument makers began to use the hairs from horse manes and tails.

The dimensions of one listed at Musical Instrument Museums Online (MIMO) is 350 mmm long x 60 mm wide (bowstring to bow handle).

== Usage ==
The yelatáj chos woley is for ceremonial and shamanic use. The shaman is granted the power to invoke Nilataj, God of the Wichi ethnic group.
