= Quijongo =

Musical instrument

The quijongo is a type of musical bow used by the indigenous peoples of Nicaragua and Costa Rica. In some countries, such as El Salvador, it is known as the carimba. It was probably used by the indigenous Chorotega people of Nicoya.

It consists of a bow measuring 140cm in length, made of flexible wood with a string (generally metal) stretched between its ends. At a point a third of the way between its ends, a jicara or calabaza gourd is affixed to serve as a resonator. Sound is created by striking the string with a stick, and the tone can be modulated by covering and uncovering the soundhole in the resonator with the fingers, changing the tone by a fourth or sixth.

Occasionally, it is amplified by placing the base of the bow on a separate box.

== Bibliography ==
- Native American Stringed Musical Instruments by Daniel Brinton. in The American antiquarian and oriental journal By Stephen Denison Peet Jameson & Morse, 1897 v. 19, pg 19.
- Saville, M. H.; S. Habel (September 1898). "The Musical Bow in Ancient Mexico". American Anthropologist. 11 (9): 280–284. doi:10.1525/aa.1898.11.9.02a00030. JSTOR 658759.
- Habel, Simeon (February 1878). "The Sculptures of Santa Lucia Cosumalwhuapa in Guatemala. With an account of travels in Central America and on the western coast of South America". Smithsonian Contributions to Knowledge. XXII III. Washington, D.C.: 31 – via Internet Archive.
