= Fonnkèr =

Fonnkèr is, in Réunion Creole, a state of mind specific to the people of the French overseas department of Réunion which conveys a deep feeling, a sense of love, happiness, bitterness, emotion, or thought. The term, which comes from the French fond du cœur ("bottom of one's heart"), is also applied to the modes of expression that allow such a state of mind to be externalized, in particular Réunionnais poetry, to the extent that fonnkèr can be used synonymously with "poem."

Fonnkèr can be expressed orally (as part of the island's oral traditions) or in writing or song. It follows a natural rhythm rather than more formal meter and rhyme. Artists who have specialized in fonnkèr include Danyèl Waro, Kréolokoz, Zanmari Baré, and Ann O'aro. These artists are known as fonnkézéz and fonnkézèr. The form is celebrated at the annual Koktèl Fonnkèr festival.
