= Belembaotuyan =

- Other names: eluaotuas eleaotuchan elimau-tuyan

Related instruments
- x; y

The eleaotua is a musical bow played in Guam, also spelled eluaotuas, eleaotuchan, and elimau-tuyan. This gourd-resonating musical bow likely has common roots with the Brazilian berimbau, due to constant trade between Asia and South America in the nineteenth century, during which the instrument may have been introduced to the Chamorro people. The instrument also resembles various zither/boat lutes found throughout Southeast Asia (esp. in the Philippines) called kutiyapi.

== Description ==
The eleaotua has traditionally been part of wedding and other ceremonies in Guam, such as the Chamorro Month celebrations in schools, though it has lost popularity in recent times.

The name of the instrument comes from the words eleao ('swaying of the trees' in Chamorro) and tuyan (Chamorro for 'stomach') "tua" for short. Similar to other gourd-resonating musical bows, such as the berimbau or hungu, the gourd can be made to resonate by pressing it against one's stomach cavity and the player can create a vibrato by moving the gourd towards and away their body.

== Construction ==
It is made by attaching a string to a long flat wooden stick, on top of which is a resonating gourd. The string is usually made of metal wire or hard string, and similar material is used to keep the resonating gourd in place, stopping the string which allows to produce two pitches (lower and higher) by hitting the longer or shorter sides of the stopped string respectively. At the ends of the wooden stick are placed seashells in order to produce a clearer sound. The length of the wooden stick can be between 4 ft (1.2m) and 9 ft (2.7m) long.

As heavy wire was not easily found in Guam in the past, instrument makers would use wire from rubber tires. The wood used for the body of the instrument has usually been Pacific Rosewood or hibiscus tree, both of which grow locally. Wood of young trees has been preferred, as it is more flexible and easier to bend, and a wider body is used to produce a better sound.

The gourd has usually been made of coconut or tagua, and they produce different sound: though coconut shells are easy to handle, they are much smaller, harder, and are prone to cracking.

The thin hitting stick is made out of bamboo and is usually about a foot (0.3m) long. The string used on the instrument has traditionally been made of wild pineapple fibre, whereas now it has been replaced by metal wires, which produce a louder and brighter sound.

== See also ==
- Musical bow
- Berimbau
