= Malunga =

The malunga is a single-stringed musical bow played by the Siddi of India, who are the descendants of East African immigrants. It produces two tones, an octave apart, and the knuckle of the hand supporting the instrument may be pressed against the string to vary the pitch. It is struck with a stick and, as with the berimbau of Brazil, the hand holding the stick also holds a rattle (in the case of the malunga the rattle, called mai misra). The malunga has a gourd resonator which amplifies the instrument's sound. The placement of this rattle along the string also varies the pitch produced by the Malunga.

== Construction ==
The bow is made of solid-core bamboo cane, and the string is made of three twisted strands of gut. The gourd resonator is made from a coconut shell and is a mobile part of the instrument.

== Cultural importance ==
The malunga is one of the instruments that is used in the religious practices of the Siddi people in India. This instrument is one of the few that are still in existence that can be played, though its scarcity is growing.

== Films ==
- 2003 - From Africa to India: Sidi Music in the Indian Ocean Diaspora
- 2004 - The SIDI Malunga Project: Rejuvenating the African Musical Bow in India

== See also ==
- Siddi
- Musical bow
- Berimbau
