= Cornelian Dende =

Polish-American Franciscan priest

Cornelian Dende OFM (Scranton, Pennsylvania, 1915-31 August 1996) also known as "Father Justin," was a Polish-American Franciscan priest, director of "The Rosary Hour," a Polish-language weekly radio program from Buffalo, New York.

He was born in Scranton, Pennsylvania and did his collegiate studies in Montreal, Poland and Rome.
