= Bobre =

Musical bow traditional in Mauritius and Réunion

The bobre is a musical bow traditional in Mauritius and Réunion, particularly the traditional genres, sega and maloya.

It is a long bow, made of wood with a vegetable fibre string, with a calabash acting as a resonator. It is played by striking the string with a stick.

It is no longer used in Mauritian sega but is still popular in Réunion. It is also used in Maloya.
