= Kalumbu =

Musical instrument from Zambia

The kalumbu, or kalumbo, is a traditional instrument of the Tonga and Ila people of Zambia and Zimbabwe. A single metal-stringed bow played with a stick is lashed onto a calabash gourd that acts as a resonating chamber. The kalumbu player manipulates the resonance of the instrument by moving the gourd toward and away from his or her chest. Though now quite rare in Africa, the kalumbu is considered the predecessor of the Afro-Brazilian berimbau used in Capoeira performances.

A similar instrument, the dende, is played by children in Botswana. The berimbau of Brazil is another similar instrument.
