= Ziskakan =

Musical group from Réunion

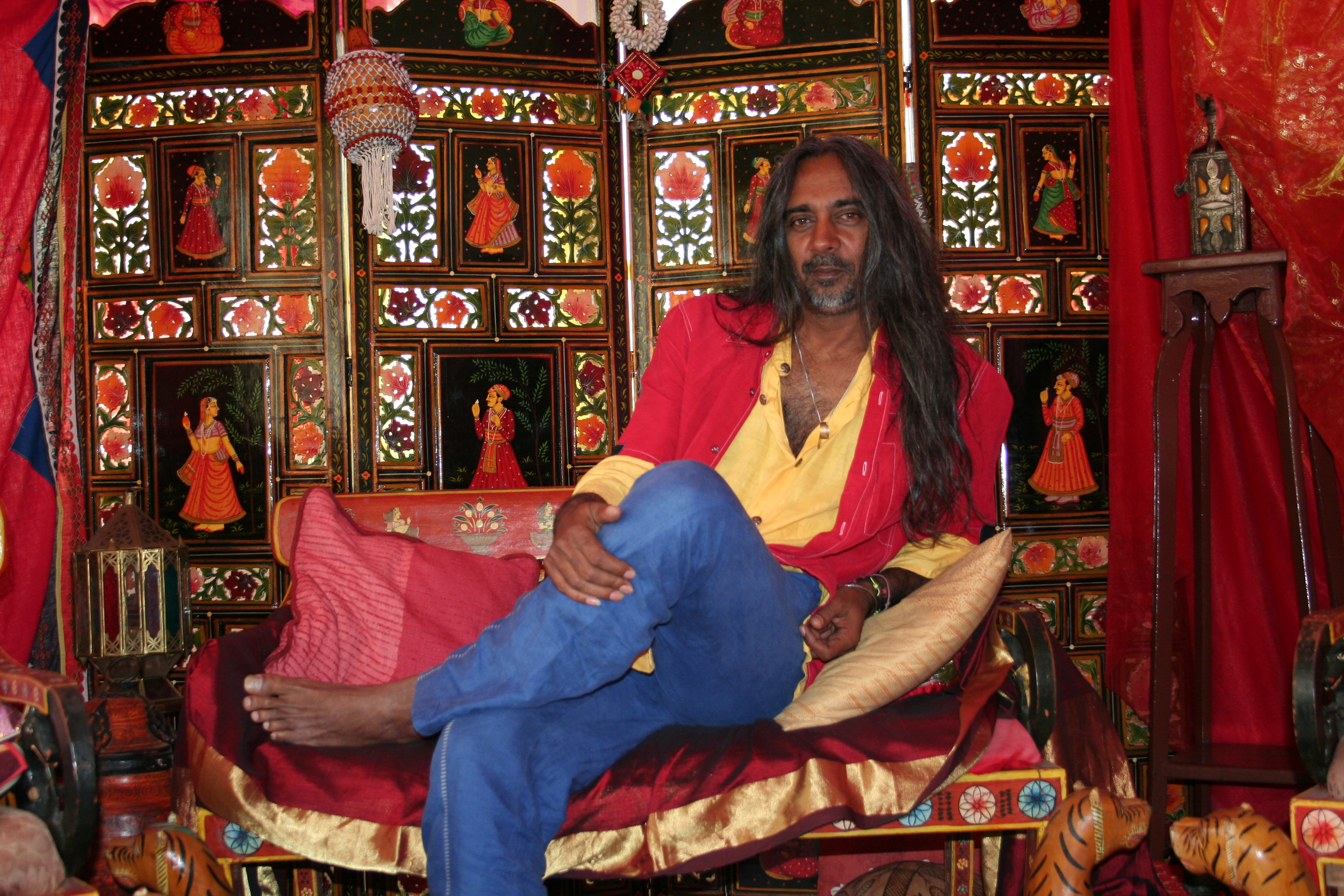
Gilbert Pounia in 2006

Ziskakan is a maloya group from Réunion. The frontman is Gilbert Pounia. They are one of the most famous bands from the island. The band formed in 1979. Their style includes adding modern techniques to traditional maloya (called electric maloya), as well as adding Indian instruments. Some of their lyrics are from early poems by Dev Virahsawmy, including many of the poems from Les Lapo Kabri Gazuyé.
