= Baster (band) =

Baster is a French band from Réunion, which founded in 1983. They perform sega, maloya and reggae. Their music has been described as electric maloya. They are one of the most popular maloya groups and perform a poetic and lyrical form of the genre.

They formed at Basse-Terre, which was formerly a village near Saint-Pierre but, due to urban sprawl, it is now part of Saint-Pierre.

Their songs are defined by their texts in Réunion Creole written and sung by Thierry Gauliris, and their addition of reggae elements, set with strong guitar solos.

In 2002, they went to the Tuff Gong studio of Bob Marley, and recorded reggae versions of his greatest hits.

== Discography ==
- Black Out Tour
- Lorison Kasé (1992)
- Mon Royom (1995)
- Live 99 (1999)
- Lèv' (2006)
- Du passé au présent (2007)
