= Célimène Gaudieux =

French musician and innkeeper (1807–1864)

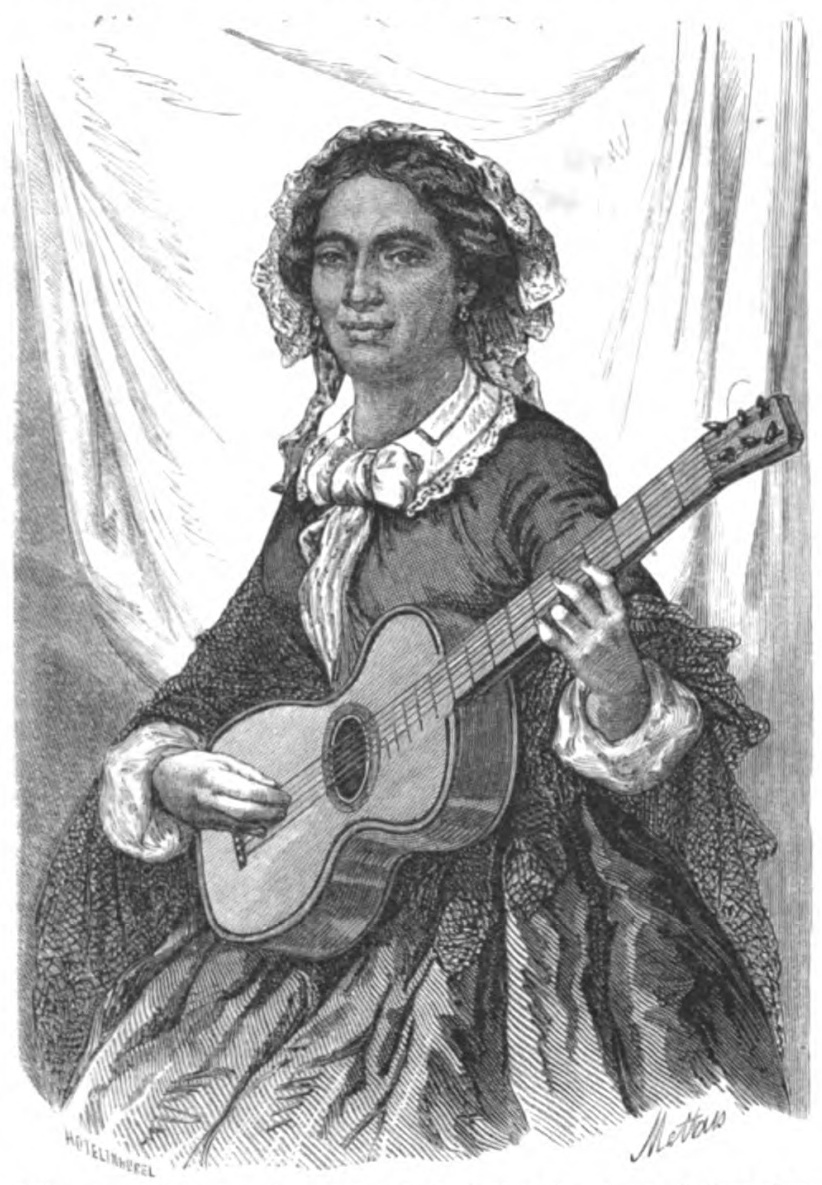

Background information
- Born: Marie-Monique; 20 April 1807; Saint-Paul, Réunion, First French Empire
- Died: 13 July 1864 (aged 57) Saint-Paul, Reunion, Second French Empire
- Occupations: Musician, innkeeper
- Instrument: Guitar
- Spouse: Pierre Gaudieux (m. 1839; died 1852)

Célimène Gaudieux (20 April 1807 – 13 July 1864) was a French mixed-race singer, nicknamed "muse of the three basins". She practiced her music while working as an innkeeper in La Saline, which still serves as a symbol and muse for the poetry and popular culture of Réunion.

== Early life and family ==
Célimène Gaudieux was born a slave on 20 April 1807 in Saint-Paul, Réunion to freeman Louis-Edmond Jeance or Jans and slave Marie-Candide. Her parents' relationship was illegal according to the rules of Code Jaune by Jean-Baptiste Colbert. She had a younger sister name Marie-Céline. As a slave, she did not attend school. Shortly after the arrival of the English on the island in 1810, she, her mother and sister were freed by Louis Edmond Jeance and Gaudieux was then registered in the civil registry as Marie-Monique Jans. Her parents married twenty years after their emancipation.

She liked to boast that she was the granddaughter of Évariste de Parny, a Reunionese poet who is said to have had an affair with her maternal grandmother, a Malagasy slave name Léda from whom a daughter Valère was born, who later married one of de Parny's slaves and gave birth to three daughters, one of whom was Gaudieux's mother.

=== Marriage ===
Gaudieux gave birth to her first child, Marie Louise Ovida on 11 January 1837. The child's father, Ferdinand Lebreton died shortly afterwards on 4 August. She then married a former gendarme, Pierre Gaudieux, who came to Réunion with his regiment, on 3 October 1839 in Saint-Paul. After the marriage, Pierre Gaudieux resigned from the gendarmerie to become a blacksmith at the coaching inn of La Saline. As his business developed from strong economic growth, he began to provide breakdown services and maintenance for public cars. They then opened an inn in La Saline to feed and accommodate travellers, which was run by Célimène. Together the couple had 5 children.

In July 1852, Pierre Gaudieux died during a smallpox epidemic in Saint-Paul, leaving Célimène with five children to support on her own. Having contracted debts, she was forced to borrow 1200 francs from Guillaume Aubry, a well-to-do merchant in Saint Paul for her daughter Marie Louise's dowry.

== Music career ==
Gaudieux learned to read and write during private lessons given to Western children in families in which she was a domestic servant. Her enjoyment of writing led her to write her own poems in French and Creole, in prose and verse. She then put the poems to music on her guitar and played them for people passing by her inn. She was nicknamed the "muse of the three basins", and was known for her sassy style and singing about dishonest whites and mulattoes. Gaudieux herself nicknamed and had engraved on the pediment of her inn "Hotel of men of wit, fools must pass by without stopping".

When she was reproached one day for being mixed race she replied "I am a mulatto, it is true, but my husband is of the white race, and it is the rule that the horse ennobles the mare".

She became known through travel personalities such as Louis Simonin and became friends with the local cultural elite, most of whom came from mainland France.

== Death and legacy ==
At the end of her life, Gaudieux became exhausted by illness and lost her audience. In 1863, the stagecoaches no longer stopped in La Saline following the modernisation of communication routes, which marked the end of her inn. In November 1863, she left the inn to settle in Saint-Paul, where she was taken in by a hospice for the indigent. Gaudieux died on 13 July 1864 in Saint-Paul, at the age of 57.

She was buried the next day, and journalist Thomy Lahuppe wrote in Le Moniteur de la Réunion on 19 July: "Célimène Gaudieux who never knew her, this woman poet and composer at the same time. His satirical verve had the talent of cheering up the most anxious brows. She handled with rare happiness the Creole patois, which she had almost made into a poetic language. What good words in these little songs that she improvised while peeling her potatoes".

Gaudieux bequeathed her songbook to Dr. Jean Milhet, but the whereabouts of this book is now unknown. Only a few songs and texts are still known. Her guitar was deposited in the collection of the Léon-Dierx Museum in 1911. Since 1989, it has been a part of the Villèle Historical Museum collection, which had it restored in 2001.
