= Maloya =

Music genre of Réunion

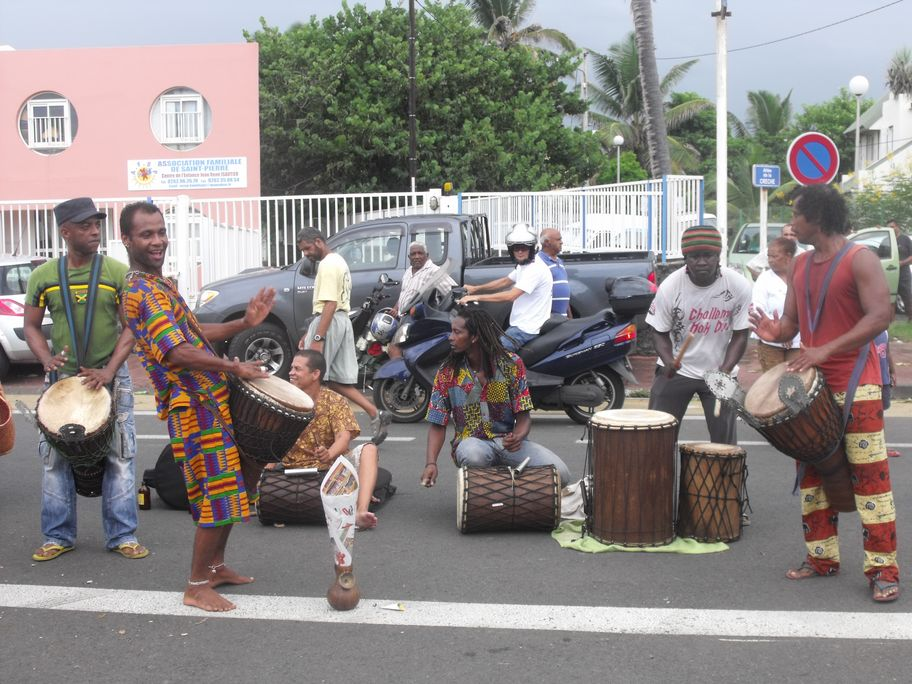
- Typical instruments: Vocals, percussion, musical bow

Regional scenes
- Réunion

Maloya
- UNESCO Intangible Cultural Heritage
- Country: France
- Reference: 00249

Inscription history
- Inscription: 2009 (4th session)
- List: Representative

Maloya is a musical genre of Reunion island, usually sung in Reunionese Creole, and traditionally accompanied by percussion and a musical bow. Maloya is a new form that has origins in the music of African and Malagasy slaves and Indian indentured workers on the island, as has the other folk music of Reunion, séga. World music journalists and non-specialist scholars sometimes compare maloya to the American music, the blues, though they have little in common. Maloya was considered such a threat to the French state that it was banned in the 1970s.

== Description ==
Compared to séga, which employs numerous string and wind European instruments, traditional maloya uses only percussion and the musical bow. Maloya songs employ a call-response structure.

=== Instruments ===
Traditional instruments include:

- roulér – a low-tuned barrel drum played with the hands
- kayamb – a flat rattle made from sugar cane tubes and seeds
- pikér – a bamboo idiophone played with sticks
- sati – a flat metal idiophone played with sticks
- bob – a braced, struck musical bow

=== Themes ===
Maloya songs are often politically oriented and their lyrical themes are often slavery and poverty.

== Origins ==
The indigenous music and dance form of maloya was often presented as a style of purely African origin, linked ancestral rituals from Africa ("service Kaf" and Madagascar (the "servis kabaré"), and as such a musical inheritance of the early slave population of the island. More recently, however, the possible influence of the sacred drumming of the Tamil religious rituals has been introduced by Danyèl Waro, which makes Maloya' heterogeneous African Malagasy and Indian influences more explicit.

== History ==
Maloya was banned until the sixties because of its strong association with creole culture. Performances by some maloya groups were banned until the eighties, partly because of their autonomist beliefs and association with the Communist Party of Réunion

Nowadays, one of the most famous maloya musicians is Danyèl Waro. His mentor, Firmin Viry, is credited as having rescued maloya from extinction. According to Françoise Vergès, the first public performance of maloya was by Firmin Viry in 1959 at the founding of the Communist Party. Maloya was adopted as a medium for political and social protest by Creole poets such as Waro, and later by groups such as Ziskakan. Since the start of the 1980s, maloya groups, such as Ziskakan, Baster, Firmin Viry, Granmoun Baba, Rwa Kaff and Ti Fock, some mixing maloya with other genres such as séga, zouk, reggae, samba, afrobeat, jazz and rock, have had recognition outside the island.

== Cultural significance ==
Maloya was inscribed in 2009 on the Representative List of the Intangible Cultural Heritage of Humanity of UNESCO for France.

This musical form was the subject of a 1994 documentary film by Jean Paul Roig, entitled Maloya Dousman.

== See also ==
- Sega music, the other traditional music of Réunion
- Music of Réunion
- List of Réunionnais
- List of blues genres § Blues-like genres
