= Mantombi Matotiyana =

- Born: Mantombi Matotiyana; 1933 (age 92–93); Tsolo, Eastern Cape, South Africa
- Origin: South Africa
- Genres: Traditional Xhosa music
- Occupations: Musician, composer, educator
- Instruments: Umrhubhe musical bow, Uhadi, Isitolotolo
- Years active: 1940s–present

Mantombi Matotiyana is a South African musician, composer, and master of traditional Xhosa instruments, umrhubhe musical bow (mouth-resonated bow), uhadi (gourd-resonated bow), and isitolotolo (Jew's harp). Her music is deeply connected to the Xhosa musical traditions, and her performances have made her a significant figure in South African cultural heritage.

== Early life ==
Mantombi Matotiyana was born in Tsolo, Eastern Cape, in 1933, to Nqweniso and Maqhangase Matotiyana. She belongs to the Mpondomise clan and traces her lineage through Mpankomo, Somarhwarhwa, Majola, Ngwanya, Qengeba, and Pahla. Raised in the former Transkei (Eastern Cape), she grew up deeply embedded in Xhosa and Mpondomise customs. Her musical journey began at the age of five or six, when her mother, a skilled umrhubhe musical bow player, taught her to play both umrhubhe musical bow and isitolotolo. By the age of ten or eleven, Matotiyana was making her own instruments.

== Personal life ==
Mantombi was married in her early twenties and had five children: four daughters and one son. Her eldest daughter, Ntombizandile, has followed in her mother’s footsteps by learning to play the umrhubhe musical bow. In her later years, Matotiyana moved to Cape Town to support her children, where she established a business with two friends. Despite facing challenges such as a severe injury from a bus accident in 1993, Mantombi continued to perform and compose, using her music as a source of healing and strength.

== Musical career ==
Mantombi's career spans decades, during which she has preserved and shared the rich musical traditions of the Xhosa people. She has performed both locally and internationally. She gained widespread recognition through her collaborations with the renowned South African ensemble Amampondo and Dizu Plaatjies’s project "Ibuyambo".

Her first solo album, titled Songs of Greeting, Healing and Heritage, was released in 2019 by the Africa Open Institute. The album is a collection of traditional songs performed with umrhubhe musical bow, uhadi, and isitolotolo. It reflects Mantombi’s deep connection to her cultural heritage and her role as a storyteller through music.

The album, produced by Michael Blake and engineered by David Langeman, is a powerful testament to her musicianship and features a minimalist production style that highlights the poetic quality of her voice and instrument. Tracks on the album, such as Wachiteka Umzi Wendoda and Wen’ UseGoli, reflect the socio-political struggles of rural South African families, particularly the hardships caused by labor migration. Other songs like Kubuhlungu Ukugula, Somandla, and Umoya Ethethile explore themes of spiritualism, a significant aspect of Matotiyana’s music.

Matotiyana’s ability to blend vocals and overtone melodies using the umrhubhe musical bow and uhadi is a key feature of her music. Her vocal style, described as having a "silvery quality," is complemented by the harmonics produced by the traditional bows she plays. Songs like Molweni demonstrate her mastery of the call-and-response technique common in Xhosa music, creating complex polyphonic textures using overdubbed vocals.

== Contributions and legacy ==
Mantombi Matotiyana’s contributions to South African music extend beyond her performances. She is celebrated for her efforts to revive and preserve umrhubhe musical bow and uhadi, instruments that were once considered extinct. Her music is a living expression of Xhosa cultural traditions, addressing themes of love, loss, spirituality, and resilience.

Mantombi's collaborations with Dizu Plaatjies and Amampondo have further cemented her status as a cultural icon. Plaatjies fondly refers to her as the "Queen of One-Take" for her ability to deliver flawless performances in recording sessions.

In addition to her musical achievements, Matotiyana has been a dedicated educator, passing on her knowledge of traditional instruments to younger generations. Her album Songs of Greeting, Healing and Heritage stands as a vital contribution to the preservation of southern African musical traditions and serves as a reminder of the cultural importance of indigenous music in contemporary society.
