= Xhosa music =

Music of the Xhosa people of South Africa

Xhosa music has long been a major part of the music of South Africa, especially in the field of jazz. Since olden times, singing has been a tradition and part of culture among the Xhosas. Traditional Xhosa music is identified using community participation, call and response structures, and overtone singing techniques. These musical elements have played a significant role in shaping modern South African jazz.

Xhosa music is characteristically expressive and communicative which includes rhythmical expression of words and sounds. It also includes physical movement employed when clapping, dancing or playing a musical instrument. Different Xhosa chiefdoms share similar musical concepts.

Xhosa music originates primarily from the Eastern Cape region of South Africa, and are historically referred to as the Transkei. This music is still embedded in social, ceremonial, and spiritual life.

== Music structures and rhythm ==
=== Structure ===
Leader and Chorus

- Xhosa traditional music commonly uses a leader and chorus format, also known as call-and-response. One lead singer will introduce a phrase, and the responding group will answer with recurring patterns. Vocals will typically enter in staggered intervals.

Cyclical/Repetition

- Songs also typically use a cyclical/repetitive structure. There is usually a very basic two-chord harmonic progression, either being V–IV or I–♭7, occasionally supported by an ostinato bass line. While this may seem simple, there is an intentional depth to the minimalism.

Layered Voices

- Layered vocals typically reinforce the importance of community behind Xhosa music. Different vocals often overlap one another, intensifying the music and emphasizing the collective voices.

Improvisation

- Improvisation is very common, especially in contemporary adaptations, adding to the established structures of the music. Because a cyclical structure is very common, performers will often improvise their vocals, emphasis, and rhythms, while maintaining the original structure.

=== Rhythms ===
Integration of Movement:

- The rhythm in Xhosa traditional music pairs with movement and dance. Songs are often structured to accompany group dancing. Performers express the rhythm with their bodily motions. The framework of the music not only supports the vocals, but also integration of bodily movement, reinforcing the importance of community.

Body Percussion

- Body percussion, especially clapping plays a notable role in shaping the rhythm of the music. Clapping goes alongside drums and vocals, contributing to the layering that is commonly seen in the music. Percussive sounds are directly coordinated into the performances.

== Music in Xhosa society ==
Music plays a significant role in Xhosa social and ceremonial life. Learning traditional music begins with incentive and desire to fully share in the life of the village as almost every occasion of life including play songs for children, the girls' and boys' umtshotsho song as they grow, the intlombe dance parties, songs and dances of initiation practices, ancestor songs and beer songs. In order to share in the rites and ceremonies, it is necessary to learn the songs. The learning of music happens through observation, attention, developing music memory, practicing and learning rhythms from others.

Initiation ceremonies, specifically male initiation (ulwaluko), are accompanied by Xhosa songs. Songs like Somagwaza are played during these ceremonies, sung by men when boys go to initiation school. Umtshotsho is typically played during weddings and sung by women, as it is well suited for their voices. Youth also participate in gatherings like umtshotsho and intlombe dance events, strengthening social bonds within the community. These events will integrate singing, movement, and group participation.

Music is also closely connected with spiritual practices. Many believe that these songs can help facilitate communication with ancestors. Musicians during marabi and mbaqanga believed in spirituality and connection with the ancestors using ritualistic music. A pianist Bheki Mseleku viewed himself as a channel to reach the ancestors, hoping to provide healing using his music. To fully understand different musical practices, it is important to understand respective cultures.

== Xhosa sound ==
Xhosa music is distinct in terms of its vocals and use of harmonic overtones. Overtone singing vocally reflect the acoustics of traditional Xhosa bow instruments.

Xhosa overtone singing is based on Xhosa bow instruments such as the 'umrhube' and 'uhadi' which are the two fundamental sounds in Xhosa music. Xhosa traditional musicians imitate the sounds of their musical bows using their voices through the maneuvering of their tongues and shaping of the mouth cavity. They produce overtones by raising the tongue therefore creating a resonance chamber. The characteristic sound of overtone singing is created by tightening the throat muscles to create a low, gutted, rasping sound. This techniques gives particularly women, a deeper voice. Overtone singing is only practiced by women and it is generally the overtone singer who leads the song. Diviners often use overtone singing as they believe that it enables them to speak to the ancestors.

The uhadi and umrhubhe are two indigenous Xhosa bow instruments. With the uhadi, pinching the string and moving the calabash creates different pitches and tones, also allowing for multiple notes to be played at once. The umrhubhe is a stringed mouth bow made from a wooden stick strung with metal or nylon wire. The performer uses the mouth as a resonator. During performances, the umrhubhe player may double the melody of the lead singer by using the bow overtones/harmonics while also whistling with the response singers.

== Contemporary influence and adaptations ==
Xhosa traditional music has played a huge role in shaping modern South Africa jazz. a study exploring the narratives of six South African jazz musicians of Xhosa heritage integrated the indigenous rhythms, harmonies, and vocals into contemporary jazz music. The study found that exposure to these Xhosa musical traditions early on contributed to the musicians composition and improvisation in their music.

The six musicians examined include: Nomfundo Xaluva, Andile Yenana, Sisonke Xonti, Siya Makuzeni, Lwanda Gogwana, and McCoy Mrubata. Andila Yenana is a pianist who described how growing up in the Eastern Cape shaped his music, specifically through exposure to traditional rhythmic cycles and harmonic minimalism. The study notes that the repetition in his music reflects features commonly found in traditional Xhosa music. Lwanda Gogwana is a trumpeter who integrates traditional Xhosa layering and overlap into contemporary jazz. His work reflects the influence of the cyclical structures in indigenous instruments and music.

Common themes within the artists emphasized the importance of their auditory learning, their participation in the music, and the incorporation of the music into contemporary performances. The artists wanted to "sound like home," causing them to include distinct cultural identities into their expanding jazz music.

== Preservation and transmission ==
Xhosa traditional music has been historically transmitted orally, rather than written sheet music. Learning the music occurs through listening, observing, and repeating the music within the community. Knowledge is passed from elders to younger generations, through ceremonial participation, social gatherings and events, as well as just daily life.

Musical education in Xhosa societies are embedded within family and community. Exposure to the music beings in childhood, as they participate in youthful dances, initiation songs, and other communal events, such as weddings. The development of their musical skills are tied with experiences, rather than formal education. In contemporary context, many South African jazz musicians describe auditory learning and familial influence being important foundations to their musical development.

=== ILAM (International Library of African Music) ===
In addition to orally transmitting music, Xhosa music has been preserved through archival recordings. Hugh Tracey recorded over 25,000 performances and published over 3,000 of these performances, now being housed at the International Library of African Music in Grahamstown. While these recordings are extensively documented, many members of Xhosa communities are unaware or have limited access to these archives. “Sound elicitation,” is when these recordings are reintroduced into the communities to allow for discussion and cultural engagement. There have been efforts made to reintroduce these recordings into the communities through listening sessions and other engagement initiatives, with the goal of reconnecting these recordings with their audiences and respective culture.

== Musical instruments ==
The uhadi, umrhube, and Ikawu and Ingqonggo drums, are commonly used in Xhosa traditional music. Uhadi:

- The uhadi is a traditional Xhosa calabash-resonated bow, and it very prominent in Xhosa music. Pinching the string and adjusting the calabash resonator can create varying pitches and tones, allowing multiple notes to play simultaneously. During performances, the uhadi player is able to play both the melody and harmony while sustaining the rhythmic patterns of the song.

Umrhube:

- The umrhubhe is a stringed mouth bow made from a wooden stick (flexible) strung with a metal or nylon string. It can be played with hands or struck with a small stick. The string itself produces two pitches, the performer will use their mouth as a resonator to amplify the harmony. During performances, the umrhubhe player can reinforce the lead singer's melody using overtones, while also whistling the melody of the response singers.

Drums:

- Ikawu: This drum is like a shield made from ox-skin that is beaten with a knobkerrie and is slammed into the ground with high forces. It is traditionally played during boys' initiation ceremonies and is accompanied by a special dance performed by the boys. The beating of the ikawu is also accompanied by battle cries.
- Ingqongqo: This rudimentary drum is made from a stiff dried ox hide and beaten with sticks. The ingqongqo is based upon the hunting shield and the drumsticks of the assegai. A bulls skin is cured and tied on a number of posts three to four feet from the ground. The instrument is played by a group of women with the sticks (amaqoqa). The skin is alternatively placed on the ground, the women sit on it and beat it with the sticks. This drum is no longer found among the Xhosa but, in the past, it was widely used by women during male circumcision ceremonies and diviners ceremonies. The drum has been replaced by modern substitutes such as pieces of cardboard or zinc which is beaten with sticks.

== Performers ==
- Amampondo
- Dizu Plaatjies
- Madosini
- Miriam Makeba
- Nofinishi Dywili

== See also ==
- Uhadi musical bow
- The Bow Project
