= Zabalaza (album) =

Studio album by Thandiswa Mazwai
- Released: 7 February 2006
- Recorded: 2004
- Genre: Kwaito
- Length: 1:02:50
- Label: La Escondida
- Producer: Malumbule

Thandiswa Mazwai chronology
Zabalaza (2006)	Ibokwe (2009)

Zabalaza is the first solo album release from the South African musical performer, Thandiswa Mazwai. Before this album, Thandiswa was most famously known as the lead singer for the kwaito group Bongo Maffin. Zabalaza (which means Rebellion in the Xhosa language) incorporates elements of kwaito, traditional Xhosa music, mbaqanga, reggae, and gospel music.

Several producers and vocalists contributed to the album: Tshepo Tshola features on "Ndilinde"; Xhosa traditional vocalist Madosini sings on "Lahl’umlenze"; Mandla Spikiri produced "Kwanele"; and "Transkei Moon" and "Ndizokulibala" were both produced by D-Rex and Jean-Paul 'Bluey' Maunick of the band Incognito. Malambule produced all other songs on the album, and he is the album's executive producer. The members of Mazwai's backing band were selected from more than 400 candidates after three days of auditions.

As additional preparation for the recording process, Mazwai embarked on a pilgrimage to her mother's home village in the Transkei, moving on to spend a fortnight in Mkhankato, Madosini's village in the heart of rural Transkei. Here she was exposed to the original sounds of Xhosa traditional melodies, and was introduced to the Uhadi, a traditional Xhosa one-string harp. Over the two weeks, Madosini imparted cultural wisdom, explaining the philosophies inherent in the creation of Xhosa music, respect for others and self, recognizing the spiritual realm as the true source of the music, and the key role of nature in the creation of music.

Zabalaza was released by the Gallo Record Company's Gallo World Vision (GWV) label.

== Track listing ==
Zabalaza — Track listing
No.	Title	Length
1.	"Mkhankatho Interlude"	0:35
2.	"Nizalwa Ngobani? (Do you know where you come from?)"	6:44
3.	"Emzini Interlude"	0:21
4.	"Ndiyahamba (I'm Leaving)"	6:19
5.	"Zabalaza (Rebellion)"	6:41
6.	"Revelation"	8:13
7.	"Indaba Interlude"	0:18
8.	"Lahl' Umlenze"	6:10
9.	"Ntyilo Ntyilo"	5:13
10.	"Ndilinde (Wait for Me)"	5:51
11.	"Kwanele (It's Enough)"	6:06
12.	"Ndizakulibala (I Will Forget You)"	5:22
13.	"Transkei Moon"	5:57
Total length:		1:02:50

== Certifications ==
Region	Certification	Certified units/sales
South Africa (RISA)	2× Platinum	60,000^{*}
^{*} Sales figures based on certification alone.

== Release history ==
Release dates and formats for Zabalaza
Region	Date	Format(s)	Edition(s)	Label	Ref.
Various	February 7, 2006	CD; Cassette	Standard	Gallo, La Escondida	
