= Koortjie =

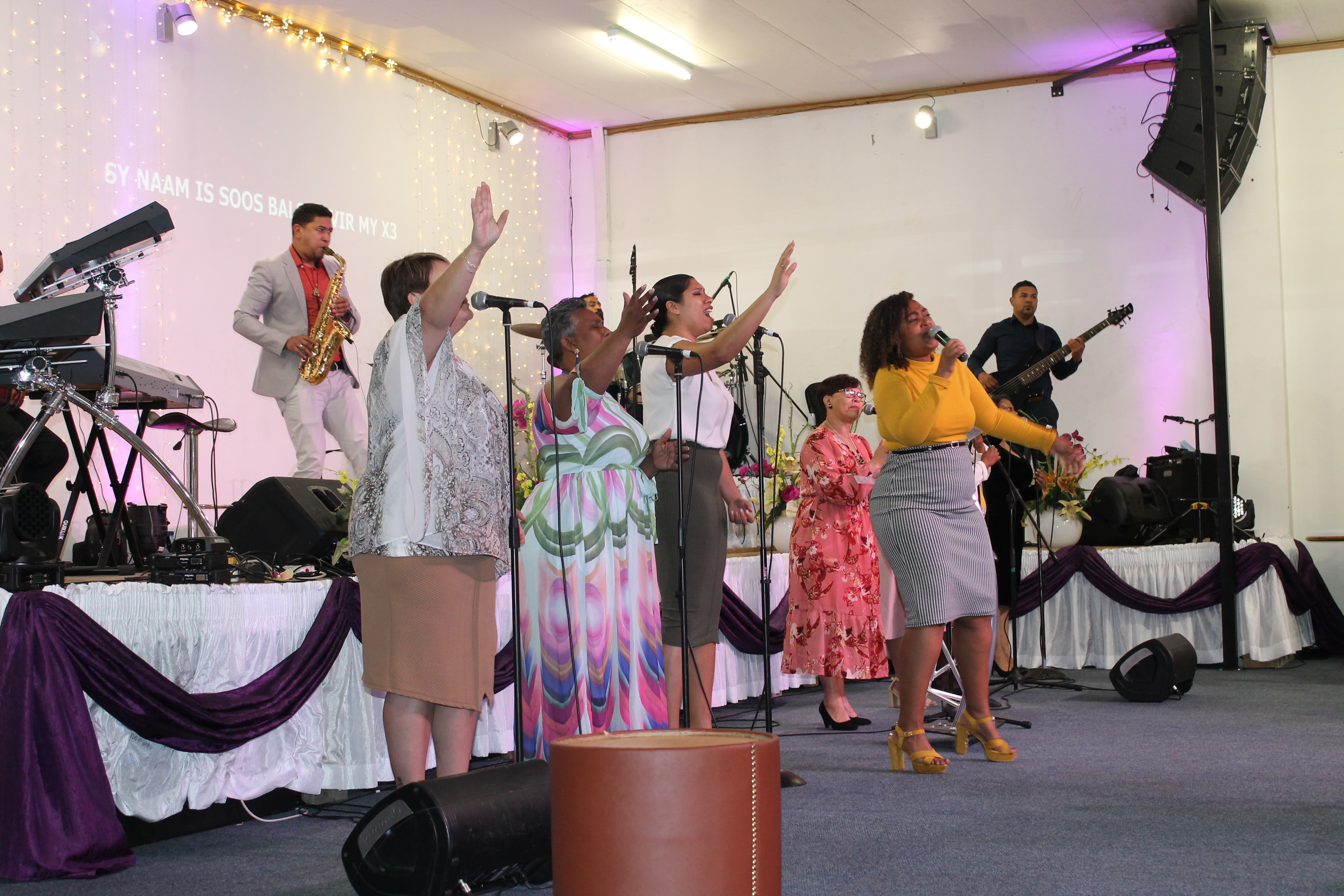

A koortjie is a short, repetitive chorus central to the worship practices of Pentecostal and other Christian communities, particularly among South Africa's coloured population. Traditionally performed in Afrikaans or English, koortjies are used in both formal church services and informal gatherings, serving as both spiritual tools and vehicles for cultural expression. Though simple in structure, they carry profound religious, social, and cultural significance, representing a blend of indigenous, colonial, and African Christian musical traditions.

== Historical and cultural context ==
The origins of the koortjie in South Africa are intertwined with the colonial missionary movements of the 19th century, which introduced Western hymns to local communities. However, the performance of koortjies evolved by incorporating elements of Khoisan and Xhosa music, alongside European hymnody. This blend is particularly evident in the rhythmic patterns, call-and-response formats, and cyclic structures of koortjies, aligning them closely with African musical traditions.

Marie Jorritsma's research on sacred music in the Karoo emphasizes that koortjies act as a "sonic archive" for the coloured communities of South Africa. They preserve histories that were otherwise excluded from official records, creating a hidden transcript of resistance against the erasure of coloured identity during apartheid. These songs, while deeply spiritual, also carry cultural memories, ensuring the survival of a marginalized community's history through oral and musical traditions.

== Role in worship ==
Koortjies are typically performed as part of congregational worship, with strong participation from the congregation, who often clap, tap hymnbooks, or sway to the rhythm of the song. In some cases, cushions with elastic bands sewn into them are used to produce percussive sounds during the singing. This participatory nature reflects the communal aspect of koortjies, where everyone contributes to the building of the song, leading to an intensification of rhythm and harmony.

The koortjie also embodies an intersection of spirituality and identity, with singers navigating between different cultural contexts. Inge Engelbrecht, in her doctoral thesis Die Koortjie Undercommons (2023), describes the koortjie as operating within the "undercommons," a space of resistance and subversion. Here, the koortjie transcends its role as a mere musical form, becoming a tool for cultural survival and spiritual expression in the face of systemic oppression.

== Modern interpretations and media representation ==
In recent years, koortjies have gained widespread recognition through television programs such as Koortjies met Jonathan Rubain, which aired from 2020 to 2024. Jonathan Rubain, a prominent Cape Town jazz and gospel musician, popularized the koortjie by blending it with contemporary gospel styles and providing a platform for local gospel talents. His program became especially popular during the COVID-19 pandemic, when it offered a source of comfort and spiritual connection to viewers.

== Musical characteristics ==
Musically, koortjies are characterized by their simplicity and repetition. They often consist of short, single-line texts that are repeated multiple times, encouraging communal participation and spiritual reflection. The lead singer, or voorsinger, plays a significant role in guiding the congregation, using a call-and-response structure that is reminiscent of African musical traditions. Harmonization is common, with members of the congregation freely adding their own vocal lines, creating a rich, layered sound.

The koortjie is more than just a musical form; it is a cultural and spiritual practice that has helped sustain and express the identity of South Africa's coloured communities. From its roots in colonial missionary music to its modern reinterpretations on television and beyond, the koortjie remains a vital part of South Africa's musical and cultural landscape, continuing to serve as both a spiritual practice and a form of resistance against cultural erasure.
