= Michael Blake (composer) =

South African composer

Michael Blake (born 31 October 1951) is a South African contemporary classical music composer and performer. He studied in Johannesburg in the 1970s and was associated with conceptual art and the emergence of an indigenous experimental music aesthetic. In 1976 he embarked on 'African Journal', a series of pieces for Western instruments that drew on his studies of traditional African music and aesthetics, which continued to expand during two decades in London until he returned to South Africa in 1998. From around 2000 African music becomes less explicit on the surface of his compositions, but elements of rhythm and repetition remain as part of a more postcolonial engagement with material and form. He works in a range of styles including minimalism and collage, and now also forages for source material from the entire musical canon.

== Biography ==
Michael Blake was born in Cape Town. He took piano lessons at the South African College of Music from the age of 9, and began composing soon afterwards. In 1970 he registered for a Bachelor of Music degree at the University of the Witwatersrand, Johannesburg studying composition with June Schneider and Klaas van Oostveen, and piano with Adolph Hallis. In 1976 he attended summer courses in Darmstadt and Dartington, and met Mauricio Kagel, Peter Maxwell Davies and Stanley Glasser. In 1977 he launched a New Music concert series at the newly opened Market Theatre in Johannesburg with his ensemble Moonchild. Later that year he left South Africa to avoid being drafted into South Africa's border war, and for the next 2 years studied for a Master of Music degree in music theory and analysis at the University of London Goldsmiths College. He was part-time lecturer at Goldsmiths College, where he founded and conducted the Goldsmiths Contemporary Music Ensemble. From 1979 to 1986 he was the keyboard player in the electroacoustic group Metanoia which he co-directed with Jonathan Impett.

In 1986 he founded the ensemble London New Music for the performance of experimental music, and the group gave regular concerts at the South Bank, Institute for Contemporary Arts and elsewhere. London New Music undertook British Council-sponsored tours in Europe, and broadcast regularly for BBC Radio 3 and European radio stations, premiering new work commissioned by Blake from his contemporaries – Gerald Barry, Matteo Fargion, Christopher Fox, Chris Newman, Howard Skempton, Kevin Volans – as well as playing non-mainstream ('downtown') composers he considered important – Henry Cowell, Ruth Crawford Seeger, Charles Ives, Stefan Wolpe, John Cage, Morton Feldman, Bunita Marcus, Barbara Monk, Christian Wolff and Walter Zimmermann. All of these ensembles also regularly played his own compositions.

At the beginning of 1998, he moved back to South Africa and settled in Grahamstown where he taught composition at Rhodes University and established the (now) annual contemporary music festival, the New Music Indaba and was its artistic director from 2000 to 2006. At the 1999 meeting of the International Society for Contemporary Music held in Bucharest, Blake made a successful bid for South Africa's re-entry into the ISCM after an absence of nearly four decades, and was President of the ISCM South African Section, NewMusicSA, for six years. From 2002 to 2009 he curated The Bow Project. He taught composition at the University of South Africa between 2007 and 2009, established the Sterkfontein Composers Meeting in 2012, and is Honorary Professor of Experimental Composition in the Africa Open Institute for Music, Research and Innovation at Stellenbosch University.

== Early work ==
After a very traditional music education at school, he immediately immersed himself in the more radical music of the twentieth century when he started his undergraduate studies, learning and performing piano works by Webern, Schoenberg, Messiaen, Stockhausen, Cage, Ives and Cardew, and discovering Dada, conceptual art, and experimental and minimalist music. As a result, his compositions from this time show many of these tendencies, for example: A Little Fantasy (1971) for two pianists, metronomes, piano movers and lighting is an indeterminist piece in the form of a kit; Five Pieces for Piccolo and Tuba (1971) is a graphic score which moves between recognizable music notation and abstract art; Quodlibet for Charles Ives (1974), a reworking of In the Inn in which the original American music quotations are literally pasted over with fragments of Cape Malay tunes; and a series somewhat akin to Mauricio Kagel's 'Conversations with Chamber Music, for example song without words (1975) for cello and piano, which deconstructs music by Mendelssohn.

== African journal ==
Growing up in Cape Town, Blake was familiar with the music of the Cape Malay choirs and Christmas bands, but only really became aware of African music when he was studying in Johannesburg and eventually met Andrew Tracey. So from the mid-1970s his musical language was partly the result of an immersion in the materials and playing techniques of African music His first mbira-based piece, for harpsichord, was written as the soundtrack of a 1976 TV documentary about African weaving, and during the following two decades that he was based in London, it was followed by pieces for string quartet, a variety of chamber ensembles, keyboard solo and duo, solo instruments, orchestra and choir, culminating in San Polyphony for organ (1998/2006), his first commission after settling back in South Africa in 1998. Several of these have become his most performed pieces, in particular Let us run out of the rain (1986) and French Suite (1994). Martin Scherzinger has described these as "understated translations of African music into Western idioms [that] deftly negotiate the borderline between quotation and abstraction, and, in the process, interrogate the opposition between the two". Alongside 'African Journal', there were also pieces which drew on other music, for example: Bach (…ode-cantata…, 1980), or Art Tatum and Fats Waller (Two Studies for Prepared Piano, 1983), or Cole Porter (Nightsongs, 1997).

== Postcolonial narratives ==
Since 2000, Michael Blake's work has taken something of a new direction and revealed a postmodern sensibility. This watershed in Blake's life is exemplified in two works: String Quartet No 1, written for his long-standing friends and collaborators the Fitzwilliam String Quartet in 2001 and premiered in Cambridge for Blake's 50th birthday celebrations, and Ways to put in the salt, an uncompromisingly stark interpretation of musical bow harmonics written in 2002 for John Tilbury. In these and other works that followed, an African sensibility is subsumed into the fractured narratives that have become a feature of his recent work, such as the Piano Concerto (2007), Piano Sonata 'Choral' (2008), and Postcolonial Song (2009). A passion for unusual timbres and instrumental combinations saw the realisation of two more commissioned works in 2007: Shoowa Panel for vibraphone and marimba (premiered in South Africa) and Rural Arias for singing saw and eleven players (premiered in Vienna). A composer who thinks on his feet and perhaps more than anyone approaches Adorno's notion of a 'musique informelle', Blake draws as much on the visual arts of Africa and the West – African weaving, abstract painting, underground cinema, silent films – as he does on African musics and American and English experimental music aesthetics.

== Discography ==
- Damba Moon: Let us run out of the rain (Ensemble Bash, CD, Sound Circus, 2001)
- Piano Music 1994-2004 (Jill Richards, CD, MBED Records, 2008)
- String Quartets 1 and 2; Piano Quintet 'Homage to Schumann' (Fitzwillian Quartet, CD, MBED Records, 2012)
- The Bow Project: String Quartet No 3 'Nofinishi' (Nightingale String Quartet, CD, TUTL, 2012)
- The Philosophy of Composition (Friedrich Gauwerky and Daan Vandewalle, CD, WERGO, 2018)
- Too Late for the Prayers: Shoowa Panel; Umngqokolo (Duo Infinite, Marietjie Pauw, CD, AOI, 2020)
- Afrikosmos (Antony Gray, CD, Divine Art DDA 21374, 2023)

== Filmography ==
- Untitled by Aryan Kaganof (Robert Pickup, Jill Richards, DVD, African Noise Foundation, 2005)
- Music Videos by Aryan Kaganof and Michael Blake (Jill Richards, DVD, African Noise Foundation, 2007–2010)

== Selected compositions ==
=== Stage ===
- Searching for Salome (2004–9) Opera in 7 scenes for soprano, mezzo-soprano, alto, 2 countertenors, tenor, 2 baritones, bass, dancer, clarinet in Bb, bassoon, trumpet in C, tuba, percussion (1 player), pianola (disklavier ad lib), violin, viola, electronic tape and video

=== Orchestra ===
- Kwela (1992) First version: string orchestra, Second version: elastic scoring
- Brandenburg Floor Plan (2003) for baroque orchestra
- Gautango (2007) for harp and strings
- Let the Good Times Roll! (2019) for symphonic wind ensemble
- Mémorial (2020) for large symphony orchestra
- Suite for Small Orchestra (2021)
- Symphony(2022)

=== Orchestra with soloist(s) ===
- Out of the Darkness (1993–94) for piano and small orchestra (withdrawn)
- Concerto Grosso (1998) for two solo violins and string orchestra
- Concerto for Piano and Orchestra 'Rain Dancing' (2007)
- Cello/Orchestra (2013) for cello and chamber orchestra

=== Chamber music for 2-7 players ===
- Five Pieces for Piccolo and Tuba (1971)
- song without words (1975) for cello and piano
- Hymn and Variations (1978) for string quartet
- ...ode-cantata... (1980) for percussion and chamber ensemble with optional speaker
- Self Delectative Songs (1986)
- Cum martelli incrudena (1987)
- The Seasons at Home (1987–88) for guitar and chamber ensemble
- Quartet for Flute and Strings (1989; rev.1999)
- Honey Gathering Song (1989; rev. 1999) for flute and piano (or harpsichord or fortepiano), or elastic scoring
- Hindewhu (1989–90) for two classical or modern clarinets in Bb or soprano saxophones
- Quintet for Basset Clarinet and String Quartet (1990) for classical or modern instruments
- Leaf Carrying Song (1991–93) for oboe d'amore (or oboe or alto flute) and ten-string guitar, or birbyne (or oboe or flute), violin, viola and cello, or wind instrument in C (birbyne or oboe or flute) and harpsichord, or violin and harp
- Let us run out of the rain (1986; 1991) for string quartet
- Mysteries (in memoriam J C) (1993) for four percussionists
- Let us run out of the rain (1986; 1993) for vibraphone and marimba (4 players)
- Carpet of Memory (1994/1996/1998) for voice-flute, bass viol and harpsichord or violin, cello and piano
- Birthday Fanfare (1998) for four tubas or tuba and tape
- Untitled (2000) for clarinet in A and piano
- KwaDtit (2000) for recorder quartet
- Quartet for Piano, Violin, Viola and Cello (2000)
- String Quartet No 1 'in Memory of William Burton' (2001)
- Do you prefer red or white? (2004) for violin and piano
- Quintet for Piano and Strings 'Homage to Schumann' (2006)
- Song of the Bullfrogs (2006) for saxophone quartet (soprano, alto, tenor, baritone) and tape
- String Quartet No 2 (2006)
- Shoowa Panel (2007) for vibraphone and marimba
- The Philosophy of Composition 'in Memory of Don Maclennan' (2009) for cello and piano
- String Quartet No 3 'Nofinishi' (2009)
- String Quartet No 4 (2010)
- Standing Stone Circle (2013) for harp and peripatetic violinist
- String Quartet No 5 (2014)
- Souvenir de Prague (2014) for two violins, cello and harmonium
- Alto Trombone and Vibe (2015) for alto trombone and vibraphone
- Sonata for Cello and Piano 'Hours with the Masters' (2016)
- The Waaihoek Tea Party (2017) for double bass and piano
- Lovedale Harmony (2018) for saxophone quartet (soprano, alto, tenor, baritone)

=== Chamber music for large ensemble ===
- Strings and Electric Guitar (2000) for seven baroque instruments and electric guitar
- Isicamngco (2001) for double saxophone quartet (2 soprano, 2 alto, 2 tenor, baritone, bass)
- Rural Arias (2007) for singing saw and 11 players
- Postcolonial Song 'Homage to Percy Grainger (2008) for elastic scoring
- Piano Concerto No 2 'Boschpoort' (2013) for piano and 7 instruments
- Fanfare for a New Institute (2018) for three instrumental groups in separate but connected spaces

=== Solo instrument ===
- Spirit (1985) for flute solo
- Three Venda Children's Songs (1996) for guitar
- Marimba Etudes (2009)
- Pentimenti (2012) for solo cello and imagined accompaniment
- Mister Turner His Folie (2017) for guitar
- Umngqokolo (2018) for solo alto flute

=== Solo piano ===
- Gang o'Notes (1983) Study No 1 for prepared piano
- Cadenzas for Mozart's Piano Concerto in D minor K466 (1994)
- French Suite (1994)
- Three Toys (1995/1997)
- Nightsongs (1997/99) for piano
- BWV Fragments (1999) for keyboard (piano, harpsichord, clavichord or organ)
- 38a Hill Street Blues (2000)
- Remembering Stravinsky ... Morges, Autumn 2001
- Ways to Put in the Salt (2002)
- iKostina (2003)
- Their souls go waltzing on (2003)
- Piano Sonata 'Choral' (2008)
- A Fractured Landscape 'in memoriam Edward Said' (2009)
- Hob Fragments (2009)
- Fifteen Transformations (after Christopher Alexander) (2010)
- 100 Voicings (2012)
- Si Lu Sapo Variations (2013)
- à b (2016)
- Afrikosmos (2015–2020) Six books of piano pieces from easy to concert level

=== Two pianists ===
- A Little Fantasy (1971) Kit for two pianists, metronomes, piano movers and lighting
- Let us run out of the rain (1986; rev.1993) for two to play at one piano or harpsichord
- Thirteen Inventions (1988) for two pianos
- Reverie (1995–96; rev. 1999) for two pianos
- Sonata for Two Pianos 'Homage to Schumann' (2007)
- From the Stoep (2012) Three Easy Pieces for Piano Duet
- Five Walks in the Limousin Woods (2015) Five Easy Pieces for Piano Duet

=== Organ and harpsichord ===
- Ground Weave (1976) for harpsichord
- Hommage à MDCLXXXV (1985; rev.1994) for harpsichord (in meantone tuning)
- San Polyphony (1998; rev. 1999/2006) for organ
- Gary and Elbé's Love Song (2007) for organ
- Symphony No 2 'Tshikona' (2018) for Huygens-Fokker 31-tone organ

=== Choral ===
- Beamish Grace (1988; rev.1989) SAB a cappella
- Five Traditional Animal Poems of the Khoikhoi (1992) SATB a cappella
- Carol of the Three Outas (1993) Soprano solo and SSA a cappella
- The Ballad of Poui (1994) Cantata for soloists, SSAA and two percussionists
- Jesus, Our Mighty Lord (2004) Anthem for SATB a cappella
- O when will I see that day (2007) Motet for SATB a cappella
- Migrations (or The Parable of the Journey to the South) (2015) for 16 solo voices

=== Solo vocal ===
- Solstice (2006) for tenor, horn and piano (or string quartet)
- All Eleven (2010) for tenor and string quartet
- ...only the song of the birds (2015) Pastoral (after Stravinsky) for mezzo-soprano (doubling kazoo), flute (doubling alto flute, bass flute and ocarina), kannel (doubling Jew's harp) and cello (doubling Swanee whistle)

=== Film ===
- The Furiosus (1998) for string quartet
- Erotikon (2000) Score for the 1929 silent film by Gustav Machaty for flute, bass clarinet, viola and piano
- SMS Sugar Man (2006)
- Lamentation/Klaaglied (2016)
- Nattlige Toner/Night Music (2020) Score for the 1918 silent film by Georg af Klercker for violin and harp

=== Electroacoustic ===
- Ways to Put in the Salt (Havana Version) (2007) for piano and tape
- Morija Birdscape with Luigi Russolo (2013) for two-track tape
- Tombeau de Mosoeu Moerane (2011) for soprano birbyne (or clarinet or alto saxophone) and tape
- Ukukhalisa Umrhubhe (2013) for umrhubhe and tape
- Displaced: 101 Ways to Long for a Home (2018) for keyboard soloist and foundsoundtrack

=== Multimedia ===
- At Land (2003) for flugelhorn, fretless bass, piano, tape and video
- Ringtones (2006) for violin, cellphone and video camera
- 20 Fragments in the Form of a Serial (2012) for piano and video

=== Artworks ===
- Five Pieces for Piccolo and Tuba (1971/2018) Limited edition artist book, in collaboration with Heléne van Aswegen, The Book Workshop
