= Madosini =

South African musician (1943–2022)

Latozi "Madosini" Mpahleni
- Also known as: Madosini
- Born: Latozi Mpahleni; 25 December 1943; KwaDlomo, Eastern Cape, South Africa
- Died: 23 December 2022 (aged 78) Mthatha, South Africa
- Genres: Xhosa traditional music, world music
- Occupations: Musician, singer, cultural custodian
- Instruments: Uhadi (gourd bow), umrhubhe (mouth bow), isitolotolo (Jew’s harp)
- Years active: 1974–2022
- Label: Melt 2000

Latozi Mpahleni (25 December 1943 – 23 December 2022), better known by her clan name Madosini, was a South African musician, singer, and cultural custodian. She was celebrated for her mastery of traditional Xhosa musical instruments such as the uhadi (gourd bow), umrhubhe (mouth bow), and isitolotolo (Jew's harp). Madosini was regarded as a "national treasure" and a leading figure in the preservation of Xhosa indigenous music.

== Biography ==
Madosini, the second-born child of her mother, Manjuza, showed an early interest in traditional Xhosa instruments. After being diagnosed with polio at the age of 12, her mother taught her to play the uhadi to comfort her, sparking a lifelong dedication to Xhosa music. Largely self-taught, Madosini did not receive formal education but devoted her life to perfecting Xhosa musical traditions under her mother's tutelage.

Madosini's music and persona were deeply rooted in the oral traditions of the Mpondomise clan. She was known not just as a musician but also as a storyteller, composer, and cultural custodian, embodying the traditional aspects of her people through her performances. Her artistic identity was informed by the rich oral histories, cultural practices, and communal nature of Xhosa music-making. Madosini's performances were often described as highly individual and expressive, while also staying true to traditional idioms. She drew on various forms of oral tradition, including iintsomi (traditional song-stories) and amabali (narratives), integrating them into her art in a way that reflected both the past and her own creative improvisations.

Though she spent nearly two decades in Langa, Cape Town, Madosini maintained strong ties to her cultural roots in the village of Mkhankatho, Libode district. Her music was celebrated internationally for its authenticity and was often performed at world music festivals such as WOMAD.

== Career and musical legacy ==
Madosini recorded her first album in 1974, contributing eight songs for a recording linked to an adaptation of Macbeth titled Maxhosa. Although she was paid only R8.00, her music gained popularity, particularly with the song Uthando Luphelile, which became a signature tune for Radio Xhosa (now Umhlobo Wenene FM).

Her breakthrough in the international music scene came in the late 1990s when she collaborated with Professor Dizu Plaatjies and later Robert Trunz of the Meltz2000 label on the album Power to the Women (1998). This project, recorded in Johannesburg, was critically acclaimed.

Madosini's career spanned decades, during which she collaborated with a wide array of musicians, including South African artists Sibongile Khumalo, Ringo Madlingozi, Thandiswa Mazwai, Msaki, and the younger generation of uhadi instrument players such as Thandeka Mfinyongo, Dumama, Qhawekazi Giyose, Lindokuhle Matina, Mthwakazi, Sky Dladla, Odwa Bongo, just to name a few, as well as international stars such as Patrick Duff, Gilberto Gil, and composer Hans Huyssen, who wrote the oratorio Songs of Madosini performed during a sold-out European tour. She also performed at prestigious festivals, including WOMAD, where she was the first person documented in the festival's Musical Elders Archive Project. Her collaboration with musicians Hilton Schilder, Jonny Blundell, WhaWha Mosieu and Pedro Espi-Sanchis resulted in the recording of an African/Jazz fusion CD under the name of AmaThongo and various concerts around Africa. Madosini and Pedro performed together at many music festivals as well as story telling and poetry festivals around the world, notably the Medellin International Poetry Festival in Colombia.

Despite her success, Madosini remained committed to her cultural roots, dividing her time between her home in Langa, Cape Town, and Mkhankatho, where she supported her large extended family.

== The Songs of Madosini ==
The Songs of Madosini is a composition by Hans Huyssen, featuring Madosini. Commissioned by Robert Brooks for the ICMF 2002, this work is an intercultural collaboration that merges European classical instruments (clarinet and string quartet) with traditional Mpondomise instruments played by Madosini, such as the uhadi (gourd bow), umrhubhe (mouth-bow), and isitolotolo (Jew's harp). This fusion creates a dynamic exchange between African and European musical idioms, exploring their coexistence and interaction.

The composition is divided into seven movements, each inspired by Madosini's traditional songs. It opens with "Uthando lundahlule" ("Love has fooled me"), introducing the uhadi through haunting melodies. Movements like "Umjeko" ("The procession") and "Imfihlelo" ("The secret") showcase the umrhubhe and isitolotolo, reflecting childhood games and traditional guessing practices. The fifth movement, "uLoliwe usuka eMtata" ("The train from Umtata"), symbolizes the migration from rural to urban life, mapping South Africa's cultural geography. "Ndibona uMadiba Sophitsho" ("I see Madiba") is a praise song for Nelson Mandela, expressing gratitude for his role in fostering intercultural dialogue. The final movement, "Hlakula ntokazi" ("Weed, old woman!"), revisits themes of cultural preservation, concluding with a haunting vision of the future where indigenous sounds risk fading away.

More than just a musical work, The Songs of Madosini serves as an intervention that addresses the complexities of South Africa's pluralistic society. Huyssen's composition respects the integrity of Madosini's music while framing it within a context for dialogue with European classical elements. It urges society to recognize and preserve cultural treasures like Madosini, bridging divides and highlighting the importance of intercultural collaboration.

== Musical style and characteristics ==
Madosini's music is characterized by a harmonic structure that revolves around only two basic chords. This reflects the idiomatic nature of traditional Xhosa music and the way indigenous instruments like the uhadi (gourd bow) and umrhubhe (mouth bow) are played. In performances, these instruments produce two main pitches: an open string serving as the ground note and a stopped note a whole tone above. However, skilled players, like Madosini, bring out the overtones of these instruments, which significantly shape the melodies. The melodies strictly adhere to these fluctuating chords, maintaining a tonal consonance typical of traditional Xhosa music. This harmonic simplicity contrasts with the rhythmic complexity of her music, characterized by irregular and asymmetrical patterns built around units of duple or triple pulses. Although these patterns are repeated, each iteration is nuanced, incorporating slight variations in timing, emphasis, color, and attack. This approach creates a musical experience that, while simple on a macro level, is highly detailed and improvisational on a micro level.

Madosini's music exemplifies the cyclic perception of time in traditional African music, celebrating recurring structural elements in each performance and emphasizing the moment rather than linear development. This idiomatic style underscores the artistry and spontaneity inherent in African musical performance practices.

== Health and recognition ==
In 2019 she suffered a heart attack while performing in France and was later diagnosed with COVID-19 in 2020. After recovering she was awarded an honorary doctorate in music from Rhodes University in 2020. In September 2022, she was formally honored by Nathi Mthethwa, South Africa's former Minister of Sports, Arts, and Culture.

== Death and legacy ==
Madosini died from heart failure on 23 December 2022, at St. Mary's Hospital in Mthatha, South Africa. She received an honorary doctorate from Rhodes University in 2020.
