= Thandeka Mfinyongo =

- Born: Thandeka Louisa Mfinyongo; June 24, 1986 (age 40); Nyanga East, Cape Town, South Africa
- Genre: African indigenous music
- Occupations: Musician, Lecturer
- Instruments: Uhadi, Umrhubhe, Kora
- Years active: 2008–present

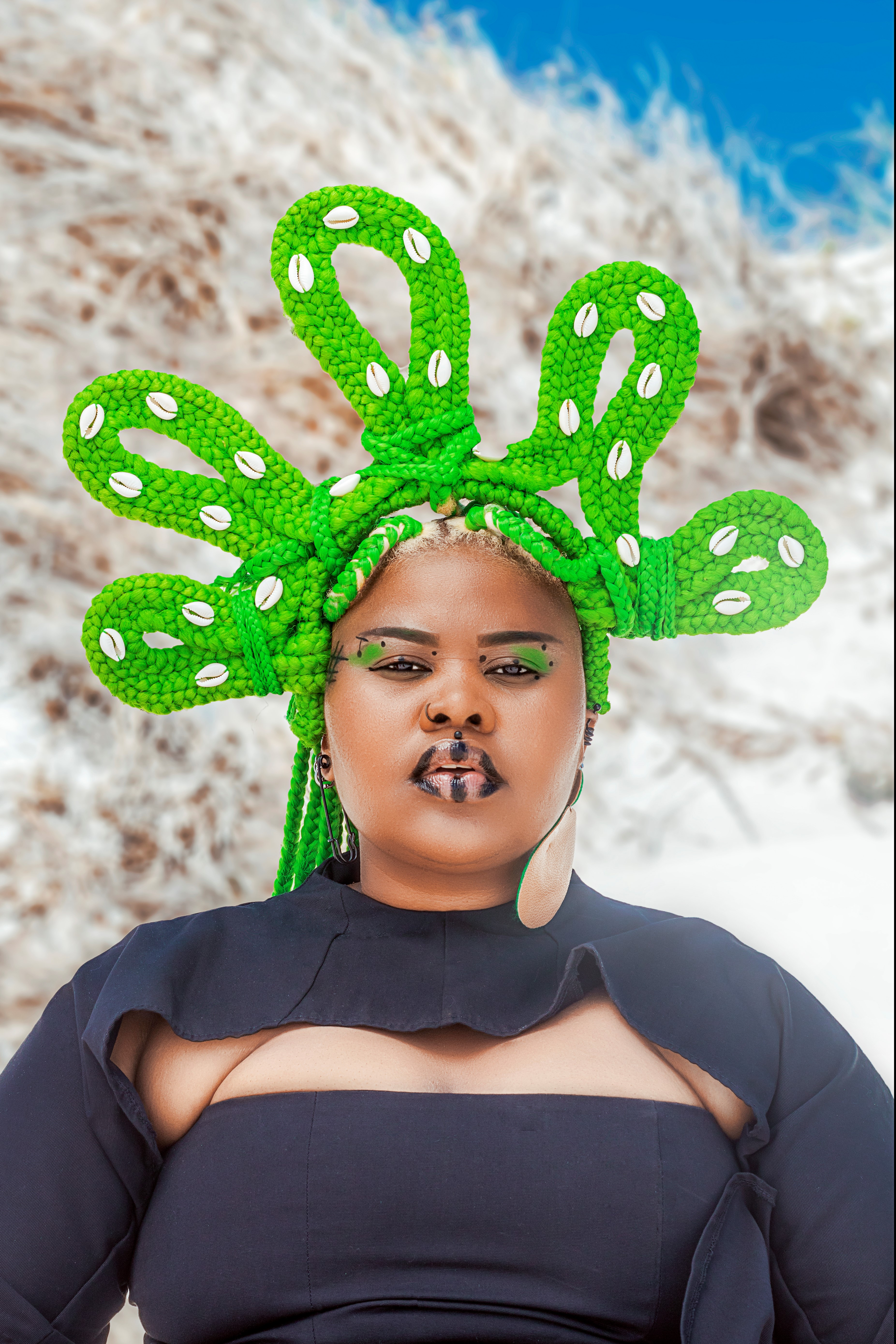

Thandeka Mfinyongo (born 24 June 1986) is a South African musician and academic specializing in the preservation and performance of indigenous African instruments. Mfinyongo is known for her mastery of the Xhosa instruments, uhadi (gourd bow) and umrhubhe (mouth bow). She currently serves as a lecturer in African music at North-West University.

== Early life and education ==
Mfinyongo was born in Nyanga East, Cape Town, and spent part of her childhood in the villages of Maqanda and Ntlalontle before returning to Cape Town in 1997. She became involved in performing arts through her church choir. After finishing high school in 2004, she studied Early Childhood Development at the College of Cape Town, graduating in 2010. Mfinyongo also attended the Cape Town Music Institute in 2012. In 2014, she enrolled at the University of Cape Town, earning a Diploma in Music Performance and an Advanced Diploma in African Music. She later obtained a Master’s in Music Performance at SOAS University of London in 2020 and is currently pursuing her PhD at Rhodes University.

== Musical career ==
Mfinyongo has performed at notable venues including the Baxter Theatre and ArtsCape in Cape Town. In 2016, she co-founded the group Azanian Aesthetics, which promotes African music and culture. Her debut single, "Wenza Ngabom" (2018), gained notable attention, and she has collaborated with several prominent South African artists, including Dumza Maswana. Mfinyongo’s dedication to indigenous instruments led her to perform with legendary musician Dr. Madosini at various events, including the Ingoduko concert in 2022, which celebrated traditional Xhosa music.

Internationally, she has performed at the Global LBQ Conference and events hosted by the South African Embassy in London. During the COVID-19 pandemic, she reached audiences globally through virtual concerts.

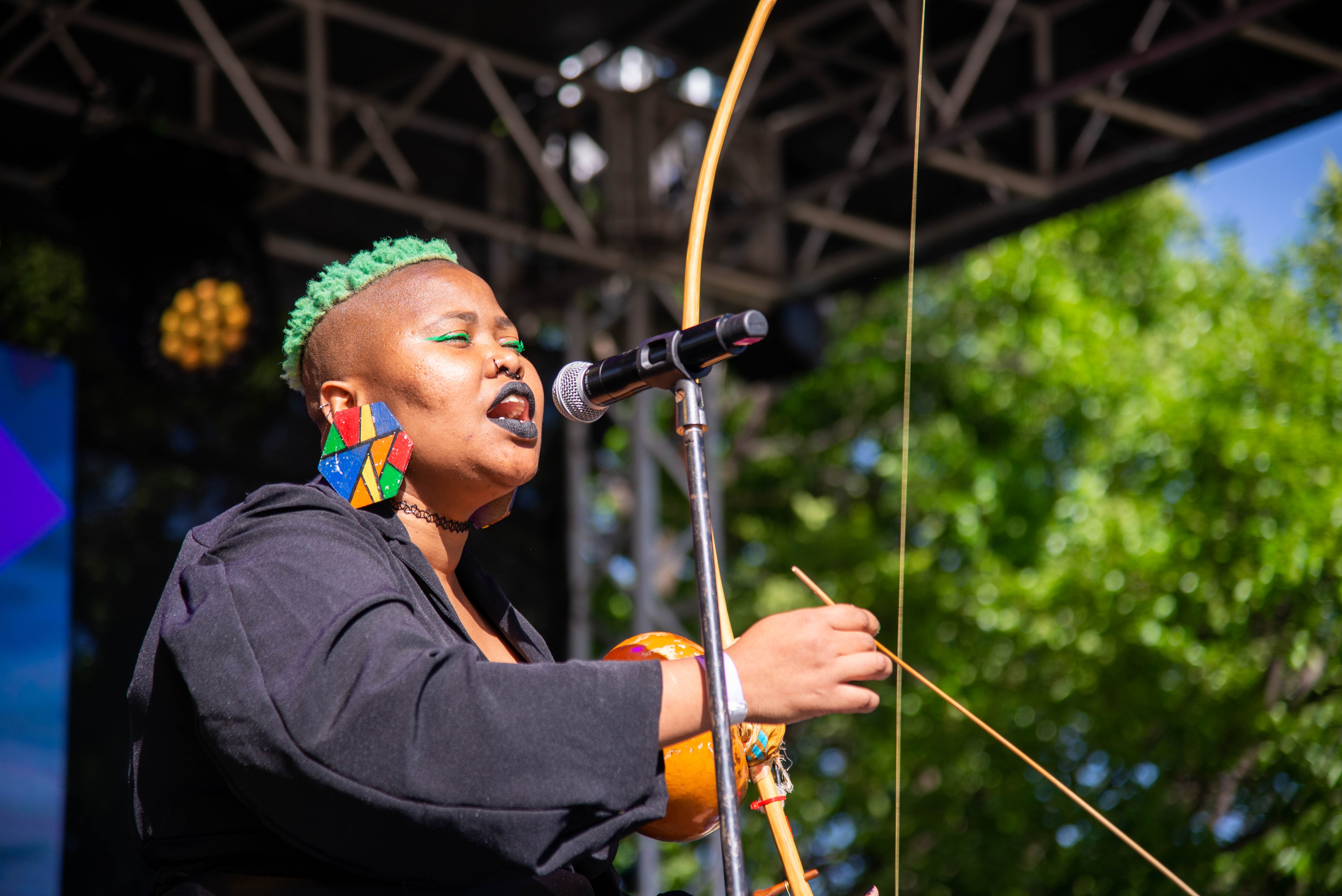

== Collaboration with Madosini ==
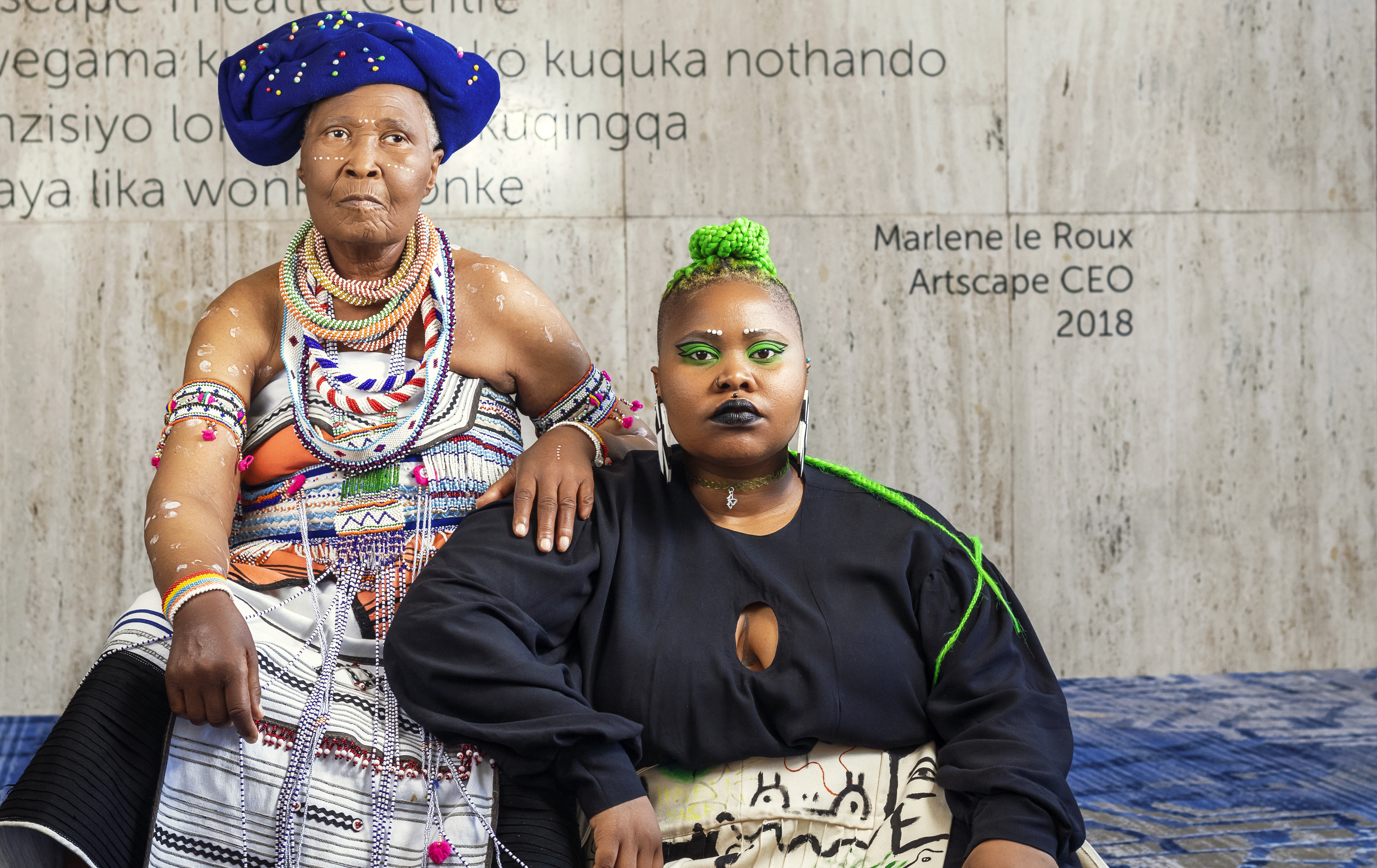
Madosini and Mfinyongo at the Artscape theatre in 2022

Mfinyongo’s most notable collaboration has been with Madosini, a master of traditional Xhosa instruments. Mfinyongo cites Madosini as one of her greatest influences, and the two performed together at numerous concerts, including the tribute concert Ingoduko. Their collaboration played a crucial role in preserving and revitalizing traditional Xhosa music for modern audiences.

== Awards and recognition ==
Mfinyongo has received multiple accolades, including the Rhodes University Top 100 Award for Arts, Media, Culture & Society. Her performances are widely recognized for blending traditional Xhosa music with contemporary influences, captivating both local and international audiences.

== Discography ==
- "Wenza Ngabom" (2018)
- "Brighter Day" (2019) with Zyo
- "Ingoma Yam" (2020) with Zyo and Kitso
- "Ikhaya Lam" with John Atterbury (2023, Abahambi)
- "Ndinendawo Yam" with John Atterbury ft. Jali Bakary Konteh (2023, Abahambi)

== Media coverage ==
Mfinyongo has been featured in several notable media outlets, including:

- Green Savannah Diplomatic Cable: Young Africans Should Learn Indigenous Instruments
- SOAS Spirit: Humans of SOAS
- IOL: Madosini and Thandeka Mfinyongo Shine a Light on Indigenous Music
