= Imbongi =

Southern african ceremonial figure

An imbongi or a praise poet, is an oral repository who worked as a story teller and an oral historian, who performs ceremonial activities at important events. An imbongi is traditionally a male (or female) who recites emotive poetry, sings, explains family relationships, re-tells historical events and comments on current affairs. Imbongi is employed by a patron such as a king, or chief to compose verses or praise-poem about the patron's own activities. The word imbongi is used by a number of clans and nations found in Southern Africa. In West african nations imbongi is called a griot

== History ==
The earliest written record of the use of imbongi was made by Methodist missionary James Whitworth. Whitworth noted in his 6 April 1825 journal entry while visiting Gcaleka king Hintsa: "At sunset, a man proclaimed aloud the transactions of the day, which seems to be the usual custom, ending with 'Our Captain is a great Captain. When the white men came to see him, he received them kindly and gave them an ox to eat'."

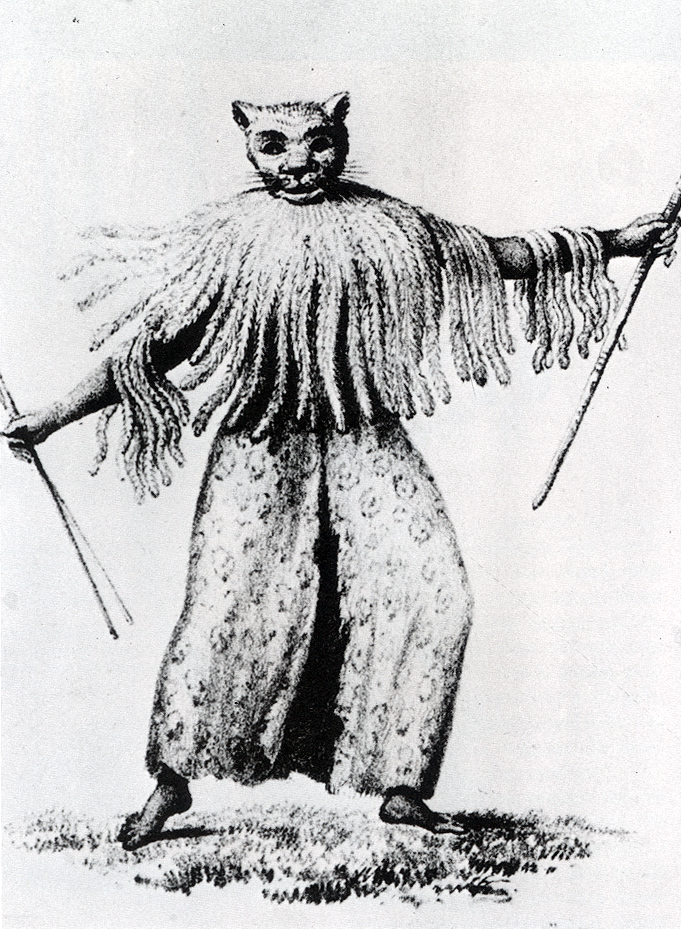
Illustration of praise singer of Dingane kaSenzangakhona by Allen Francis Gardiner in 1839

The imbongi draws poetic inspiration from his ancestors when appropriate. When praising a chief, his poetry includes references to the praise names of the chief and the chief's ancestors. In this way the imbongi seeks to garner favor from royal ancestors for the prosperity of his nation.

During the mining era in South Africa, a now discarded type of imbongi emerged. Unlike 'home' iimbongi, the mine imbongi had no special social standing because their activities were largely informal and unofficial. They helped to reinforce mine rules, and generally discouraged violence, crime, and excessive materialism. Imbongi helps to maintain social harmony by reinforcing accepted norms and Zulu cultural traditions.

The South African government incorporated the imbongi into official national events. In 2015, 74-year-old Kgato Masemola became the first female praise singer to be given the honor of heralding the arrival of a President to Parliament. She also serves as Kgoshigadi (queen) Mogoshadi Marishane's official praise poet.

== Purpose ==
An imbongi is often a member of the welcoming party on royal visits, and as such, is referred to as "the poet who walks before any great chief". According to Archie Mafeje, imbongi "frequented the chief's great place and travelled with him in traditional Nguni society. His distinctive feature is that he can recite poems without having prepared them beforehand."

An imbongi claims to be able to summon the presence of departed ancestors and facilitate communication between them and the living. It is believed that they imbue their poetry with power by invoking the names of departed ancestors. Ceremonial praises of an imbongi are used to ensure the beneficent attention of royal ancestors to the king and to his kingdom.

The Xhosa imbongi is not an entertainer, nor is he limited to just performing poetry for the royal family. The imbongi is permitted to criticize communities, use suggestive language, and make outrageous statements that are normally regarded as unacceptable for the average Xhosa man.

It is considered shameful to kill an imbongi in battle, even if he actively aggravates soldiers.

== Characteristics ==
The imbongi's performance style is generally aggressive and intimidating, and may include brandishing spears or fighting sticks and occasionally hurling them into the ground to agitate the ancestors.

Imbongi performances can often be cryptic, referring to circumstances or qualities in abstracted, allusive metaphors. They are comparable to the court jester in European literature. As an important aspect of Xhosan political ritual, the imbongi on occasion deliberately bewilders his audience by making outrageous claims or using obscene language. The Xhosa imbongi is often a member of the royal entourage. On significant public occasions, he recites poetry in praise of the chief, referring to the chief's lineage, qualities, and actions. The imbongi may include relevant social or political commentary.

Outside of his royal duties, an imbongi performs for his community on a regular basis.

Although the majority of iimbongi are male, women and children may take on the role. Only men, however, dress in the traditional garments of an imbongi during ceremonial occasions.

== National role ==
The primary consideration made when selecting a praise poet for the president's address is to rotate between languages to give each of South Africa's indigenous cultures fair representation. Parliamentary presiding officers ultimately decide who will receive the honor.

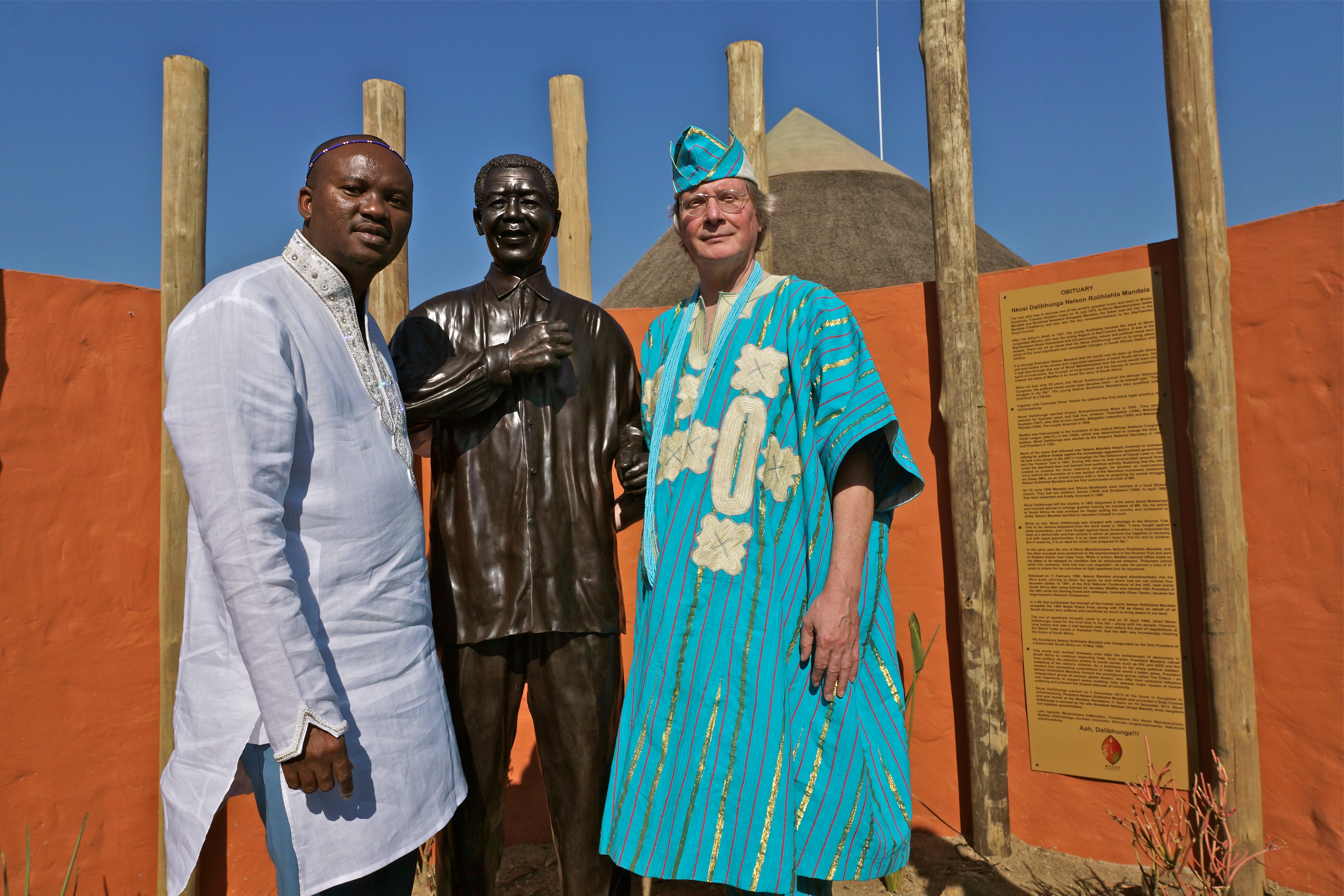
Zolani Mkiva (far left), a traditional Xhosa imbongi who often welcomed Nelson Mandela

== See also ==
- Nofinishi Dywili
- Nontsizi Mgqwetho
- Mandla Bewuzana
