= Afrikosmos =

African-classical fusion piano composition

Afrikosmos is a cycle of 75 progressive piano miniatures by South African composer Michael Blake. Spanning approximately three hours, the work was conceived as an African counterpart to Béla Bartók's six‑volume Mikrokosmos and integrates traditional sub‑Saharan musical elements with Western classical techniques and homages to a wide range of composers.

== Composition history ==
Blake first approached the idea in 2003 with the miniature "iKos'tina", commissioned for the ABRSM Spectrum series. A Rockefeller Foundation residency at the Bellagio Writers Centre in June 2015 provided the initial impetus for the full cycle, which he completed in June 2020 and for which he gratefully acknowledged the Foundation's support.

== Composition and structure ==
Following Bartók's model, Afrikosmos is published in six volumes containing 15, 14, 13, 12, 11, and 10 pieces respectively, each volume sequenced by increasing technical and conceptual complexity. Blake described the genres included in each volume as "studies, pieces focusing on rhythm and texture, character pieces, dances, pieces exploring a mode or scale, folksong arrangements and variations, transcriptions and homages".

The cycle blends original neo‑African techniques using anhemitonic pentatonic scales, Xhosa bow harmony (hexatonic scales), interlocking rhythmic structures, polyrhythms, cyclic forms, and practices such as graphic notation, inside‑the‑piano techniques, whistling, and finger‑clicks, with direct transcriptions of traditional melodies and explicit homages to composers including Erik Satie, Percy Grainger, Michael Mosoeu Moerane, György Kurtág, Henry Cowell, Robert Schumann, and Olivier Messiaen.

== Volumes ==
The list of pieces is as follows:

Volume I

1. To Comfort a Child (Lullaby)
2. Stickfighting Song
3. Interlocking Hands
4. Sefapanosaurus
5. Distant Cowbells
6. Herding Song (Pastoral)
7. Geyser Off! Hat On!
8. Fifths
9. You are a real rascal
10. Slow Dance
11. In the Hexatonic Mode
12. Wedding Song
13. Ntsikana's Bell
14. Reflection (Homage to Erik Satie)
15. Stroll to the Spaza Shop (Homage to Stanley Glasser)

Volume II

16. Canon at the Octave
17. Five Finger Patterns
18. Ostinato with Cross Rhythms
19. Call and Response
20. Four-note Patterns
21. Threshing Song
22. Lusikisiki
23. Variations on 4ths and 5ths
24. In Goema Style
25. Latshon'ilanga (The sun has set)
26. There Cried a Hippo
27. Song for the Evening
28. Haiku
29. March (Homage to Stefan Wolpe)

Volume III

30. Spotted Dikkop and Black Cuckoo
31. Smoke and Mirrors
32. Supermoon (Homage to Henry Cowell)
33. Lebombo Bone
34. iKos'tina
35. Stay on Path
36. Thirds
37. Tickey-draai
38. Two Modes Interlocking
39. Variations
40. John Knox Bokwe's “Plea for Africa”
41. Postcards from South Africa
42. African Doves (Homage to Olivier Messiaen)

Volume IV

43. Keep left, pass right
44. If I had wings I could fly
45. High Fives
46. Emerging Melody
47. Scents of Childhood 1 (Homage to Schumann)
48. Self Delectative Song
49. Seventh Must Fall
50. Chaconne in Mbaqanga Style
51. Patterns in a Heptatonic Field
52. Weave
53. Da kom die Alibama
54. Message from the Nduna (Homage to György Kurtág)

Volume V

55. The Seven Steps
56. Linong tsa lesiba (Song of the Birds)
57. Un Sonnerie pour G D
58. Chorale (Homage to MMM)
59. Scents of Childhood 2 (Homage to Schumann)
60. Walking Song (Homage to Percy Grainger)
61. Changing Times with Repeating Patterns
62. Reedpipe Dance
63. Major-Minor
64. Unevensong
65. Ituri Rain Forest (Homage to JSB)

Volume VI

66. The music flows jolly as it won't stop forever
67. Heaven's Bow
68. Night Music
69. Giyani
70. Scents of Childhood 3 (Homage to Schumann and Puccini)
71. Diary of a Dung Beetle
72. Freedom Day Variation
73. Lyric Piece (Homage to Grieg)
74. Broken Line
75. Dance in Seakhi Rhythm (Homage to Bartók and JP Mohapeloa)

== Publication ==
The six volumes were published in 2022 by Bardic Edition (BDE 1281–BDE 1286), each accompanied by detailed programme notes on individual pieces.

== Performance history ==
Pianist Antony Gray premiered most of the cycle in August 2021 during a three‑part soirée in Le Genesteix, France. On 24 September 2022, NewMusicSA presented selected movements at the South African College of Music, University of Cape Town, with Gray as soloist.

== Recording and release ==
Gray recorded the complete cycle at Menuhin Hall, Cobham, Surrey, in June 2021, with Simon Weir producing, engineering, and mastering. The three‑CD set (catalogue number DDA 21374) was released by Divine Art Recordings in spring 2023.

== Critical reception ==
Colin Clarke of Fanfare hailed Afrikosmos as "truly different, truly engaging—sonic African food for the soul", praising its structural variety and Gray's "deep saturation in Blake's score". Barry Kilpatrick in the American Record Guide noted the cycle's "wide variety of levels of difficulty" and singled out movements such as "Walking Song (Homage to Percy Grainger)", "Chaconne in Mbaqanga Style", and "Freedom Day Variation" for their rhythmic vitality and expressive depth. Stephanus Muller's analysis in Herri examined the work's intertextual dialogue with Bartók, its algorithmic compositional approach, and its material focus on sound and structure.
