= Thandiswa Mazwai =

South African musician (born 1976)

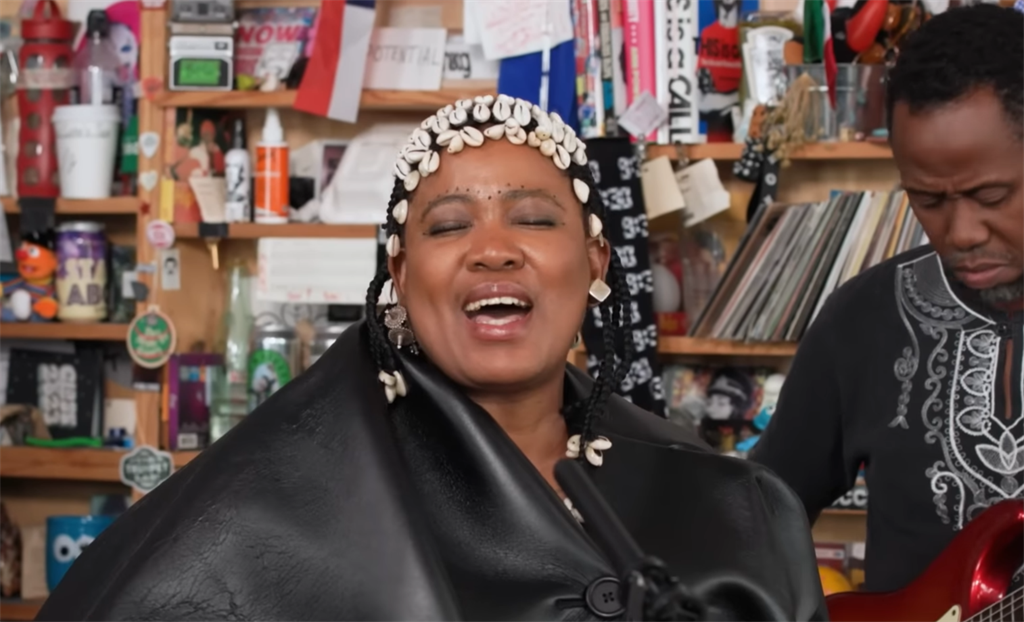
- Mazwai live at NPR Tiny Desk.

Background information
- Also known as: King Tha; Thandiswa Mazwai Belede
- Born: Thandiswa Nyameka Mazwai; 31 March 1976 (age 50); Mqanduli, Eastern Cape, South Africa
- Origin: Johannesburg, South Africa
- Genres: Traditional Rhythm; Mbaqanga; Funk; Jazz; Afro house; Afrosoul; Kwaito
- Occupation: singer
- Instrument: Vocals
- Years active: 1998–present
- Label: Gallo
- Website: thandiswa.com

Thandiswa Nyameka Mazwai (born 31 March 1976) is a South African musician, and was also the lead vocalist and songwriter of the group Bongo Maffin. She is also known as King Tha.

Her debut album, Zabalaza (released in 2004), attained double platinum status and was nominated for Planet Awards on BBC Radio 3. Also in 2004, she won Best Female Artist at the Metro FM Music Awards.

Her sophomoric release Ibokwe (2009), explored African spirituality, reached gold status within a few weeks of its release and received widespread critical acclaim. Her third solo studio album Belede (2016) is a collection of reinterpretations of legendary South African Jazz and protest anthems from the 1950s and 1960s. Thandiswa's selection is inspired by the music she listened to whilst growing up and her reframing of these classics serves as commentary on South Africa's contemporary political landscape.

Her last album Sankofa (2024) was recorded in Johannesburg, Dakar, and New York, and combines archival Xhosa field recordings, jazz and west African music. It includes songs produced by Meshell Ndegeocello, Chris Bruce, Nduduzo Makhathini, and Thandiswa. It was released to critical acclaim and won four South African Music Awards.

== Early life ==
Thandiswa Mazwai was born in Eastern Cape, South Africa, in 1976 – the year of the Soweto uprising – and grew up almost entirely in Soweto, Johannesburg, amidst the heavy apartheid township violence of the 1980s. Both her parents, Belede and Thami Mazwai, were journalists and anti-apartheid political activists, and she recollects that her home was filled with books, articles and thick with political discussions. It was this environment that nurtured her perspective as an artist. She went on to attend Wits University, where she studied English Literature and International Relations. Her work has always been inspired by her mother (who died when Thandiswa was 15 years old) and the writings of people such as Steve Biko and Frantz Fanon, Chinua Achebe and Kwame Nkrumah.

== Family ==
She has two sisters Nomsa Mazwai and Ntsiki Mazwai. She is the daughter of Thami Mazwai and Belede Mazwai- who died at the age of 34 in 1992. She has one daughter - Malaika Mazwai

== Career ==
=== Jack-Knife ===
Thandiswa was a member of Jack-Knife, with Kimon Webster and Themba Smuts. The trio was regarded as pioneers of the kwaito movement, and their songs such as "Fester" and "Chommie" were club hits.

=== Early years and Bongo Maffin ===
Thandiswa's first attempt to get noticed occurred at the Shell Road to Fame talent show but Thandiswa did not even make it to the semi-finals round. She did, however, catch the eye of musician and producer Don Laka, who arranged to include her in a project he was working on. She also began her career in 1998 with Bongo Maffin, one of the pioneering bands of Kwaito. She became widely recognised as the voice of South Africa's conscious youth, their compositions consistently combining dance floor favourites with thought-provoking lyrics. They were invited to perform all over the world, and shared the stage with musical icons Stevie Wonder, the Marley clan, Ladysmith Black Mambazo, Chaka Khan, Sean Paul, Steel Pulse and Skunk Anansie, among others. Their contribution to the South African musical cannon earned Bongo Maffin numerous awards, among them the South African Music Awards (SAMAs), the Kora All Africa Music Awards, and the Metro FM Music Awards.

=== Going solo: Thandiswa ===
After five albums with Bongo Maffin, Thandiswa ventured onto a solo career. Her first project, Zabalaza (2004), reached double platinum status and won numerous awards, including a Kora award for Best African Female and four South African Music Awards, including Best Album. It was also nominated for the BBC Radio 3 Planet awards. Her second album, Ibokwe (2009), reached gold status in the first few weeks of its release and her live DVD, Dance of the Forgotten Free (2010), won Best Female Artist and Best Live DVD in 2011. The Guardian has called her "South Africa's finest female contemporary singer."

Her music is often deeply political and her compositions include traditional Xhosa rhythms, Mbaqanga, reggae, kwaito and funk and jazz sounds.

Thandiswa has performed all over the world at venues, including at the 2010 FIFA World Cup Opening Ceremony, The Apollo in New York, WOMEX, the Cannes Film Festival, Midem, the Hackney Empire, Africa Brazil Festival, FESPACO Film Festival, BBC World Music Awards and many Mandela 46664 concerts. She has several noteworthy collaborations. Among other collaborations, she sang in Xhosa with the US musician Meshell Ndegeocello on the albums The World Has Made Me the Man of My Dreams (2007, nominated for a Grammy), and The Omnichord Real Book (2023). At home in South Africa, Thandiswa has collaborated with illustrious musicians including Hugh Masekela, Stimela, the late Busi Mhlongo. Together with the rock band BLK JKS, Thandiswa performed as 'King Tha' vs. BLK JKS at the 2017 Afropunk Festival Johannesburg.

In July 2012, she duetted with Paul Simon in Hyde Park, London, in his Graceland album's 25th anniversary concert. She sang the female vocals on "Under African Skies", which was originally sung by Linda Ronstadt on the Graceland album.

Her fourth studio album, Sankofa, was released on 10 May 2024. To further promote her album, Mazwai embarked on a three-city tour in support of Sankofa; the tour commenced at the Carnival City in Johannesburg on 11 May and concluded at Artscape in Cape Town on 20 July. The album earned her four awards for Best Female Artist of the Year, Best Produced Album of the Year, Best Engineered Album, and Best African Adult Contemporary Album at the 31st ceremony of South African Music Awards.

She also performed at NPR's Tiny Desk Concert in 2024

== Discography ==
- Sankofa (2024) - Universal Music Group
- Belede (2016) - Universal Music Group
- Dance of the Forgotten Free (2010) – Live CD: Gallo Records
- Ibokwe (2009): Gallo Records
- Zabalaza (2004): Gallo Records

Bongo Maffin

- From Bongo With Love (2019): Universal Music Group
- New Construction (2005): Gallo Records – Gold Sales
- Bongolution (2001): Sony BMG – Double Platinum Sales
- The Concerto (1998): Sony BMG – Multi Platinum Sales
- Final Entry (1997): EMI
- Leaders of D’Gong (1996): EMI

== Awards and nominations ==
=== Thandiswa ===
Year	Work	Award	Results
2004	Zabalaza	Metro FM Awards: Best Female Artist	Won
2004	Zabalaza	Kora Africa Music Awards: Best Female Artist, Southern Africa	Won
2004	Zabalaza	Kora Africa Music Awards: Best Female Artist, Africa	Won
2005	Zabalaza	South African Music Award: Best Female Artist	Won
2005	Zabalaza	South African Music Award: Best African Contemporary Album	Won
2005	Zabalaza	BBC World Music Awards: Best African Album	Nominated
2005	Zabalaza	Channel O Music Awards: Best Music Video 'La'hlumenze'	Won
2005		Metropolitan Eastern Cape Awards, Arts and Culture Award	Won
2008		Pan African Language Board: Female Artist of the Decade	Won
2008	Nizalwa Ngobani	Pan African Language Board: Song of the Decade	Won
2010	Ibokwe	South African Music Award: Best African Contemporary Album	Nominated
2010	Ibokwe	South African Music Award: Best Female Artist	Nominated
2011	Dance of the Forgotten Free: LIVE	South African Music Award: Best Contemporary DVD	Won
2011	Dance of the Forgotten Free: LIVE	South African Music Award: Best Female Artist	Won
2025	Sankofa	Female Artist of the Year	Won
2025	Sankofa	Best Produced Album	Won
2025	Sankofa	Best Engineered Album	Won
2025	Sankofa	Best African Adult Contemporary Album	Won
2025	GQ	Music Icon Award	Won

=== Bongo Maffin ===
Year	Nominee / work	Award	Result
1999	The Concerto	South African Music Awards: Best African Pop Album	Won
2001		Kora Africa Music Awards: Best African Group	Won
2002	Bongolution	Metro FM Awards: Best African Pop	Won
2002	Bongolution	Metro FM Awards: Best Duo/Group	Won
2002	Bongolution	South African Music Award: Best Duo/Group	Won
2006	New Construction	South African Music Award: Best Duo/Group	Won
2006	New Construction	Kora Africa Music Awards: Best African Group	Won
2006	New Construction	BBC World Music Awards: Best African Album	Nominated
