= Fitzwilliam Quartet =

British string quartet

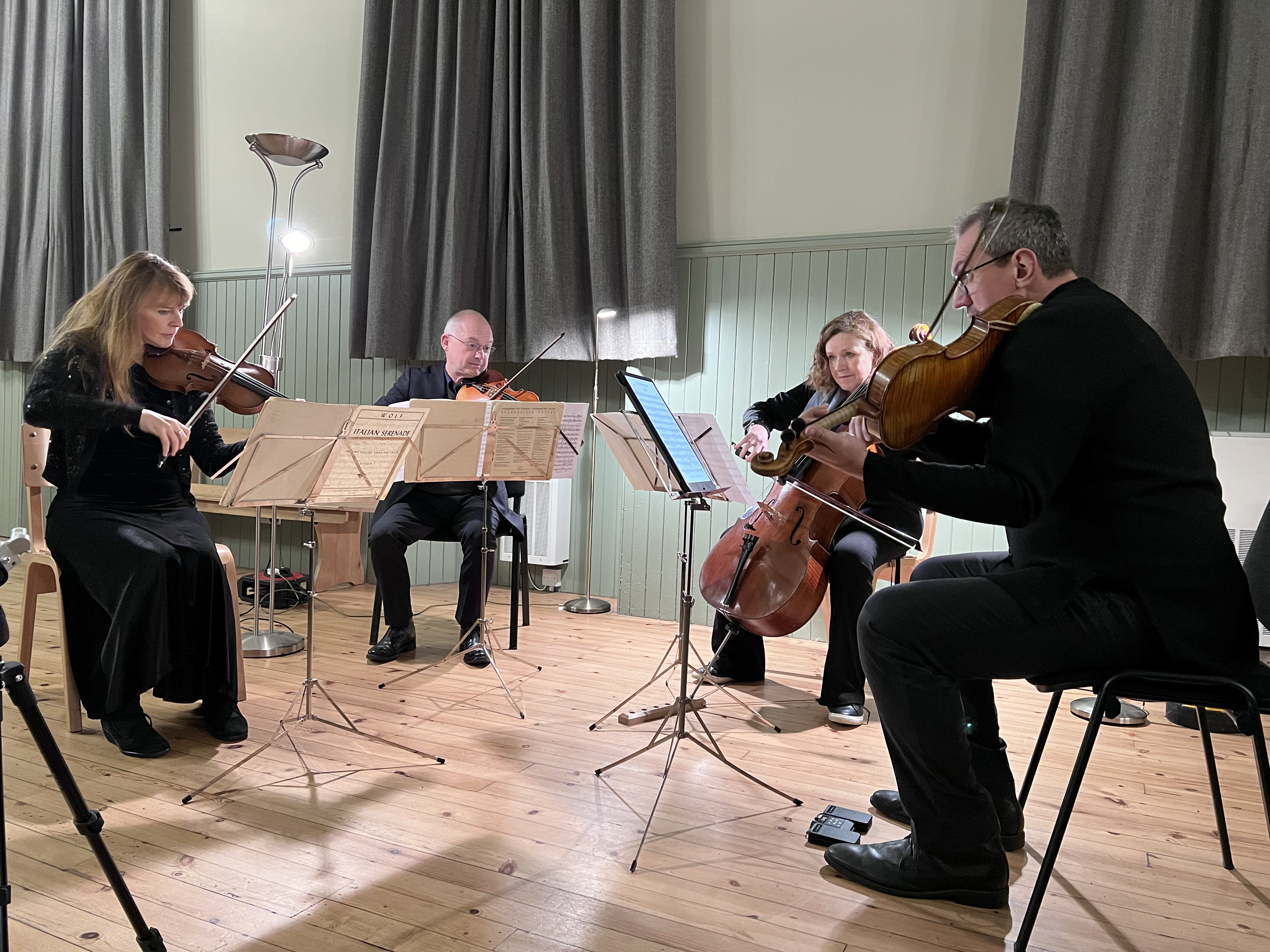
The Fitzwilliam String Quartet perform in Blair Atholl on 30 November 2024

The Fitzwilliam Quartet or Fitzwilliam String Quartet (FSQ) is a British string quartet founded in 1968 by four undergraduates of the University of Cambridge. The quartet is one of the longest-established chamber ensembles in the world and is particularly noted for its close association with the composer Dmitri Shostakovich, who entrusted them with the Western premières of his last three string quartets. The FSQ was the first group outside the Soviet Union to perform and record all fifteen of Shostakovich's string quartets, a cycle that earned them international acclaim and a long-term recording contract with Decca.

The quartet's Shostakovich recordings were highly decorated, winning the first-ever Gramophone Award for Chamber Music in 1977 and being included in Gramophone magazine's "100 Greatest-ever Recordings" in 2005. The composer himself held the quartet in high regard, reportedly telling Benjamin Britten that the Fitzwilliam were his "preferred performers of my quartets".

While maintaining its pre-eminence in the interpretation of Shostakovich's works, the FSQ performs a diverse repertoire ranging from the late 17th century to the present day, including a commitment to new music that has resulted in the addition of over 60 new works to the repertoire. The quartet is also known for its work with historical instrument setups, including recording Schubert and Beethoven on gut strings.

== Members ==
The Fitzwilliam Quartet has experienced several personnel changes since its founding. The current members are:

Instrument	Name
First Violin	Lucy Russell
Second Violin	Andrew Roberts
Viola	Francis Kefford
Cello	Ursula Smith

== Founding Member steps down ==
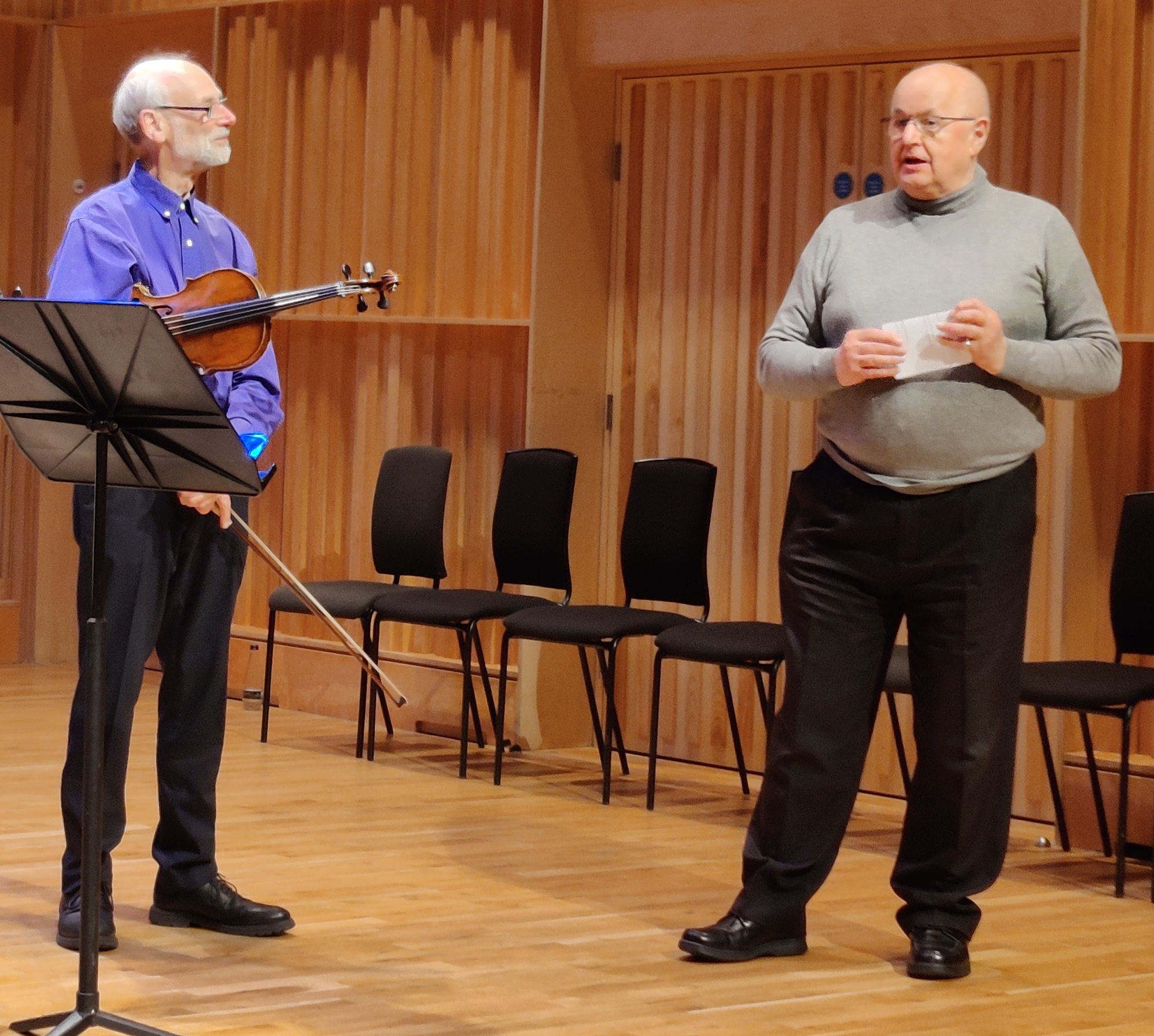
Alan George (left) at Royal Birmingham Conservatoire after a performance on 13 November 2025, being surprised with the award of honorary life membership of the British Viola Society, by the society's membership secretary, Tim Walton.

In 2024, founding member Alan George stepped aside from the ensemble after an "incredible 56 years" as the violist, a tenure that makes him one of the longest-serving string quartet players in the world. George was succeeded by Australian-born violist Francis Kefford, who has performed with ensembles such as the Royal Opera House and the Philharmonia Orchestra. The current longest serving member of the quartet is now violinist Lucy Russell who joined the Fitzwilliam in 1988, becoming leader in 1995.

== History and Shostakovich Association ==
The quartet was founded in 1968 by four undergraduates at the University of Cambridge. Following their graduation, they accepted their first professional appointment as Quartet in Residence at the University of York in 1971.

The association with Dmitri Shostakovich began in 1972 when the composer travelled to York to hear the British première of his String Quartet No. 13. This meeting fostered a "musical friendship" that led to Shostakovich entrusting the FSQ with the Western premières of his final two quartets. The composer wrote to the quartet regarding their performance of his String Quartet No. 13:

...The Fitzwilliam Quartet, whom I admire very much. Thank you for a superlative performance of my thirteenth quartet.

A planned visit to the composer in Moscow was cancelled following his death in August 1975. The quartet proceeded to become the first group to perform and record the complete cycle of all fifteen Shostakovich quartets, giving complete cycles in major centres including London, New York, and Montréal.

== Recordings ==
The Fitzwilliam Quartet has an extensive discography across various labels, including Decca, Linn Records, and Divine Art.

Notable recordings include:

- Shostakovich String Quartets: The complete cycle, originally for Decca, which secured the quartet's international reputation and won the first Gramophone Award for Chamber Music in 1977.
- Schubert and Beethoven on Gut Strings: A long-term project to record these composers on historical instruments, initiated during the quartet's 50th anniversary season in 2018 with Schubert's late quartets. Recordings of Beethoven's Opp. 131 and 135 are forthcoming.
- Collaborations: Recordings include Haydn's The Seven Last Words of Christ (Linn Records), the Brahms Clarinet Quintet (with Lesley Schatzberger), and Vaughan Williams's On Wenlock Edge (with tenor James Gilchrist and pianist Anna Tilbrook). They have also recorded contemporary works by composers such as John Ramsay, Michael Blake, and Liz Dilnot Johnson.

== Residencies and Education ==
The FSQ has held numerous university residencies throughout its history, including:

- University of York (12 years)
- University of Warwick (3 years)
- Fitzwilliam College, Cambridge (1998–2020)
- Bucknell University, Pennsylvania, USA (1978–2016)

The quartet's current university work continues at Clare Hall, Cambridge and at the University of St Andrews.

The ensemble is also committed to music education, running its own course, Strings in Spring, at St Andrews University, and teaching regularly at Benslow Music near London.
