= Bongo Maffin =

South African kwaito music group

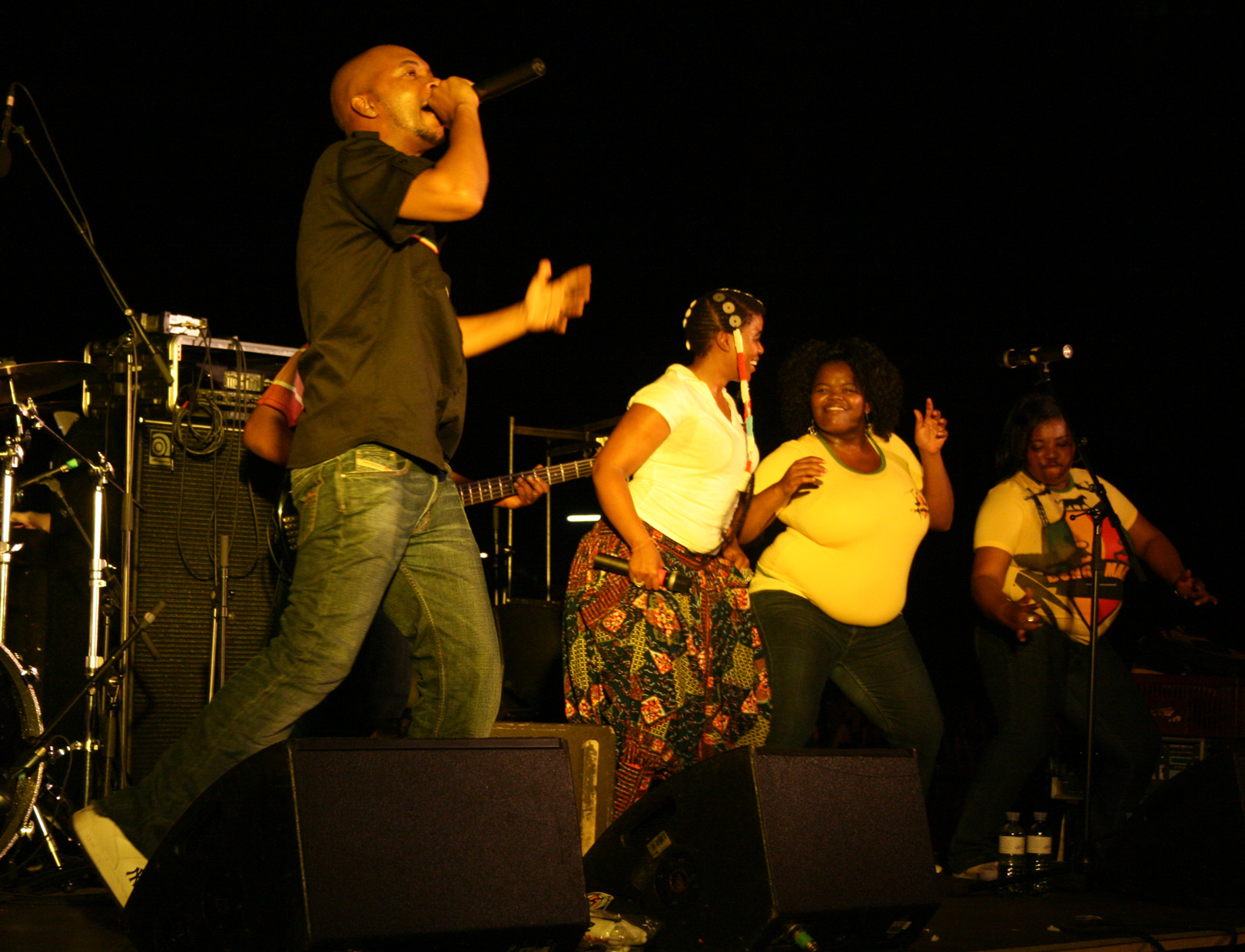
- Bongo Maffin on stage in Vienna (2008)

Background information
- Origin: South Africa
- Genres: Kwaito
- Labels: Sony Music International; Gallo Record Company; Kalawa Jazmee Records
- Members: Jah Seed; Stoan Seate; Thandiswa Mazwai; Speedy

Bongo Maffin is a South African kwaito music group, formed by Zimbabwe-born DJ Jah Seed in Johannesburg in 1996. They released their first studio album, Leaders of D’Gong (1997), followed by The Concerto (1998), Bongolution (2001), and New Construction (2005). The four-member group consisted of Stoan Seate, Jah Seed, Speedy, and lead vocalist Thandiswa Mazwai, who released her debut solo album, Zabalaza, in 2006, after the group split up. The group reunited in 2019 and released a new album, From Bongo With Love.

== Discography ==
- From Bongo With Love (2019): Universal Music Group
- New Construction (2005): Gallo Records – Gold Sales
- Bongolution (2001): Sony BMG – Double Platinum Sales
- IV (1999): Universal Music Group
- The Concerto (1998): Sony BMG – Multi-Platinum Sales
- Final Entry (1997): EMI
- Leaders of D’Gong (1996): EMI

== Album awards ==
Year	Nominated work	Category	Result	Notes
1999	The Concerto	South African Music Awards: Best African Pop Album	Won	
2001	Bongolution	Kora Africa Music Awards: Best African Group	Won	
2001	Bongolution	Metro FM Awards: Best African Pop	Won	
2001	Bongolution	Metro FM Awards: Best Duo/Group	Won	
2002	Bongolution	South African Music Award: Best Duo/Group	Won	
2006	New Construction	South African Music Award: Best Duo/Group	Won	
2006	New Construction	Kora Africa Music Awards: Best African Group	Won	
2006	New Construction	BBC World Music Awards: Best African Album	Nominated	

== See also ==
- Music of South Africa
