= Nofinishi Dywili =

Traditional Xhosa musician

Nofinishi Dywili (1928–2002) was a traditional Thembu musician who achieved much recognition throughout her lifetime. She is regarded as the master of "uhadi" music and the master of Xhosa song productions such as The Bow Project.

== Early life ==
She was born in 1928 as Notreyeni Booi in the village of Ngqoko approximately 10 kilometres south of the town of Lady Frere in the Glen Grey District east of Queenstown in the Eastern Cape Province of South Africa. Nofinishi Dywili was a Thembu person and her clan name was Mam'Gcina (Gcina). She was baptised in a Catholic church and practised both African and catholic traditions. She learned how to play the traditional "Uhadi" musical bow from an early age by observing and imitating other uhadi players. She also learned traditional lore and practices which related to the training of women and young girls.

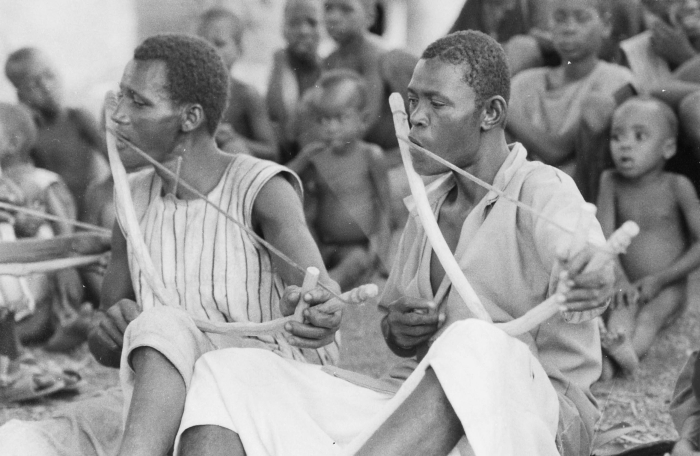
An African traditional musical bow.

== Personal life ==
At the age of 23, Nofinishi married Mr Qongqothwane N. Dywili with whom she had a son, Makwedini, and six daughters. Her name, Nofinishi, was given to her by her father-in-law. Culturally this was his right, as the one who paid the bride-price (ikhazi) for her on behalf of his son. The name Nofinishi is derived from the word "finish", and means "Mother Finish", with the probable implication that her father-in-law was at last finished with paying bride-price for his sons. Qongqothwane worked in mines in Johannesburg however, he left the mines to work on maize and sorghum fields around Ngqoko with his wife soon after their marriage. Nofinishi also worked in her vegetable garden during her spare time. One of her daughters, Nongangekho Dywili also became a traditional musician and played the "umrhubhe" which is a mouth bow. Nofinishi was described as a physically strong woman and could work on the fields for many hours. Her physical strength allowed her to hold the "uhadi" for long periods of time.

== Career ==
Nofinishi Dywili was recognised by the people of her village as a teacher of traditions and customs, she played a significant role in the training of girls and young women to help them prepare for marriage. She shared advice with women at initiation schools and outside of traditional ceremonies. Dywili's musical talents started becoming known to the world in 1981 when Andrew Tracey brought some traditional village musicians including Nofinishi, to perform at the ethnomusicology symposium at Rhodes University. This was her first performance in a South African city. Soon after the symposium she began referring to herself as "Nofinishi waseRhini" which translates to "Nofinishi of Grahamstown". Soon after her performance at Rhodes University, other South African universities requested for her to perform during their events. In 1986, Nofinishi and 14 other people from the village of Ngqoqo were requested to perform at the Grahamstown Festival where each person received a payment of R450. Nofinishi along with the rest of the performers from Ngqoqo village who performed at the Grahamstown Festival, including Nokontoni (later Nokoleji) Matiso, the chief diviner of Ngqoko, had a meeting with the aim of seeking further performance opportunities. The outcome of the meeting was the decision, prompted by Nofinishi and Nokontoni, to create a traditional music group. This was the beginning of the increasingly well-known Ngqoko Traditional Xhosa Music Ensemble, also known as the Ngqoko Cultural Group. In 1989, Nofinishi made her first trip outside of South Africa where she visited Paris, France with six other performers from Ngqoko to perform in the Autumn Festival there. One of the attendees of one of their performances included Madame Mitterrand, the wife of the French president at the time. Nofinishi has also performed for the visiting Queen of the United Kingdom in Cape Town in 1999 and various other prominent people in South Africa. Throughout her career, she made many more trips to Europe and the United States of America. Traditional Xhosa music does not place much emphasis on giving accreditation to composers as the majority of the music is passed down from generation to generation. However, Nofinishi often improvised and recreated the traditional music. She also known to have composed her own work including Makwedini, a song for her son Makwedini and UYehova ngumalusi wam (The Lord is my Shepherd). She described her music as "iingoma zesiXhosa" – "songs of Xhosa culture". She was acknowledged as the leading uhadi player in Ngqoko, and was also regarded as one of the most important Xhosa song leaders of the 20th century.

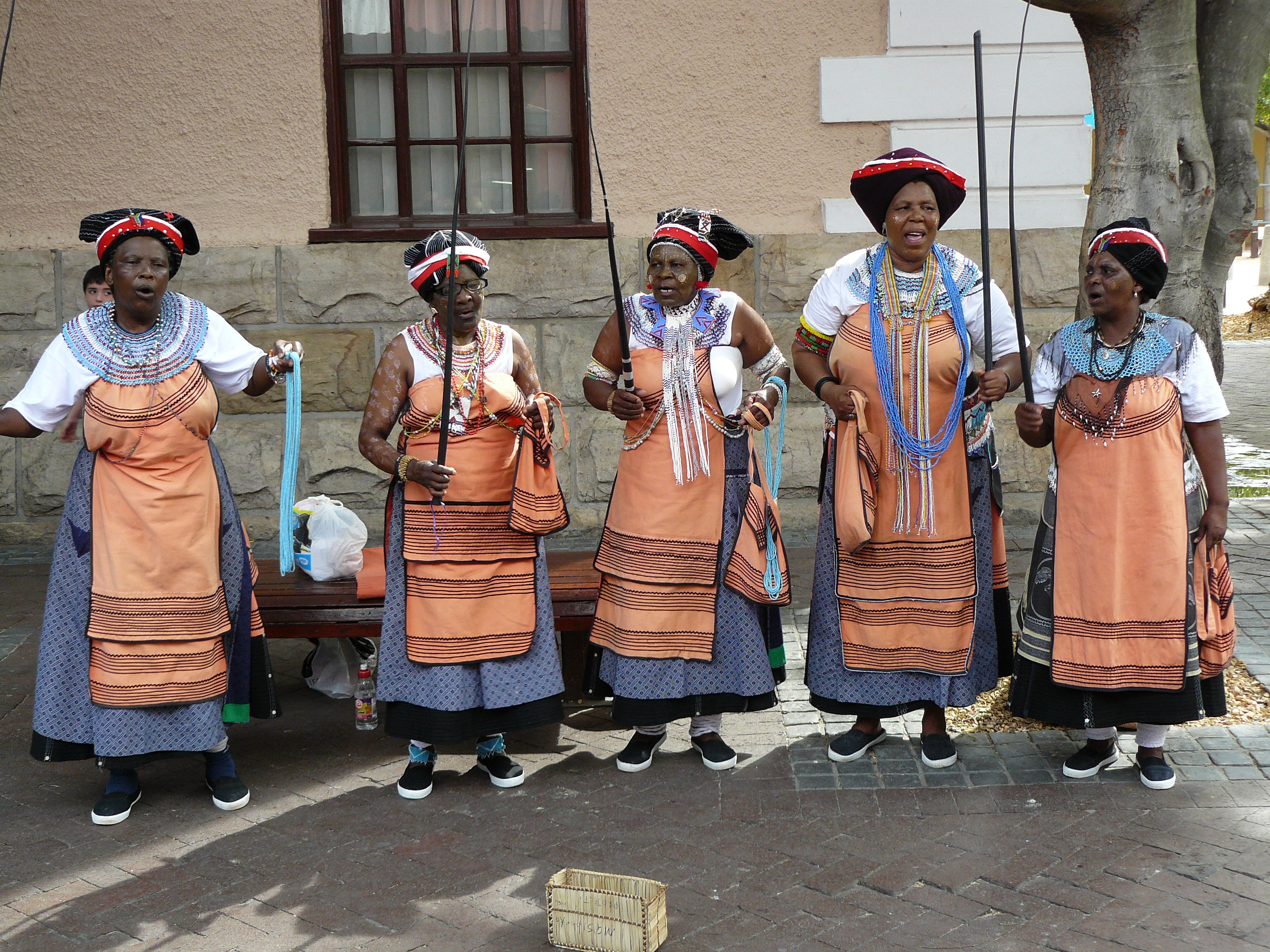
Xhosa women in traditional Xhosa attire performing

Traditional Xhosa songs are in a call-and-response form. The song leader leads the song by singing the "call", and the rest of the people respond to the call in song. The song leader also chooses the songs to be sung, and helps structure and organise the different traditional ceremonies. In Ngqoko, Nofinishi was the most important leader of beer songs, these were ancestor songs sung at beer gatherings. She knew and could lead diviners' songs, songs for the young men's dance gatherings, and for the boys' and girls' dances, as well as songs for other rites and ceremonies. She also led the celebratory' dance songs, however she would sometimes cede this role when leader of a higher ranking was present. By the end of the 20th century, there were very few people available with the broad skills that Dywili had as she became a living embodiment of the traditions and lore of the Xhosa people. She had vast knowledge of the songs, customs, rites and traditional language of her people regardless of having never learnt to read or write. She called herself "iQaba nomRoma" which translates as "someone who paints him/herself with ochre", i.e., who lives in the traditional way, Christian missionaries often incorrectly translated "iQaba nomRoma" as pagan.

== Honours ==
She died at the age of 74 in 2002 and soon after her death, she was honoured with the Lifetime Achievement Award of the South African Arts and Culture Trust. It is difficult for new uhadi performers to emulate the complex rhythms used by Nofinishi however it is her contribution to the Xhosa Thembu music which inspired the introduction of "uhadi performance" into the University of Fort Hare music syllabus in the 1990s. Other universities that have incorporated "uhadi" music into their African music teaching include Walter Sisulu University, the University of Cape Town and Rhodes University.

== See also ==
- Xhosa music
- Amampondo
- Uhadi musical bow
- Xhosa praise poet (imbongi)
