= Elastic scoring =

Musical arrangement style

Elastic scoring is a style of orchestration or music arrangement that uses interchangeable parts, allowing for various groups of instrumentalists or vocalists to perform a piece of music. This style was first used by the Australian composer Percy Grainger (1882–1961). The South African composer Michael Blake (born 1951) also used it for some of his works.

== Purpose ==
An example of this technique of orchestration is when a composer or arranger provides extra sheet music parts so a flute quartet (four flutes) can play the same piece as a group comprising two flutes, alto flute and bass flute, resulting a choir-like sound. In other words, a subtle re-engineering of the original work.

This technique involves making extra and/or interchangeable musical parts which provide substitutions for more or fewer musicians depending on what is required for an individual performance. This also allows a musical work to be played in smaller communities where the required instruments may not always be available.

One of the main tenets of elastic scoring is that the new arrangement preserve as much as possible the original interval relationship (to the closest octave) between notes while not being overly concerned with timbre (tone colour) or number of instruments. Timbre is the aspect of music varied most through changing instrument or number of instruments.

== Techniques ==
Besides providing alternative instrumentation in the form of sheet music parts, the elastic scoring concept allows three subsets of scoring music.

=== Lateral scoring ===
Lateral scoring can be said to have occurred when a piece of music is set for one or more instruments from the original number of instruments. An example of this is if a piece of music set for flute and piano is re-scored for clarinet and piano. In this instance, the intervallic relationships remain the same, but the tone colour has changed.

=== Expansion scoring ===
Expansion scoring is a style of arranging or orchestration that lets composers and arrangers enlarge the original work from a smaller score to a larger one. An example of this is when a string quartet is expanded to become a piece for string orchestra.

=== Contraction scoring ===
Contraction scoring lets composers and arrangers reduce the original work from a larger score to a smaller score, such as when an orchestral work is reduced to piano part. The resulting piano score is more commonly known as a piano reduction.
