= Amampondo =

South African percussion ensemble

Amampondo is a South African percussion ensemble that was started by Dizu Plaatjies in Langa, Cape Town in 1979. The name in Mpondo means people of Mpondo or Pondoland, a kingdom in the Eastern Cape where most of the band's members grew up. The other founding members were Simpiwe Matole; Michael Ludonga; Mzwandile Qotoyi; Leo Mbizela and Mandla Lande. National Geographic called them "one of the most interesting and experimental groups in South Africa".

== Origins ==
The group began as buskers on the streets of Cape Town. Under the guidance of their first manager, Bruce Gordon, they made their first professional recording, The Heartbeat of Africa - Uyandibiza, recorded live in Cape Town City Hall in 1983. Beyond Memory: Recording the History, Moments and Memories of South African Music by Max Mojapelo, Sello Galane and Chris Walton (18 March 2009), African Books Collective Limited, ISBN 9781920299286. They later joined up with the owner of the Claremont Records label (formerly Graham Sound & Electronics), Donald Graham, who guided and advised them through the release of the next 2 albums.

== Ambassadors of South African Music ==
They recorded an album entitled Give Praise Where Praise Is Deserved with Archbishop Desmond Tutu, and in 1988 Amampondo were asked to play at Nelson Mandela's 70th birthday concert at Wembley. This is fitting because, like Mandela, Amampondo are part of the Xhosa-speaking tribes of South Africa. They have taught and played the world over, from Israel to Japan to Scandinavia. Upon his release from prison, Nelson Mandela promoted them as ambassadors of South African music, and later nominated them to represent their country at the opening ceremony of the 1996 Summer Olympics in Atlanta, Georgia.

== Marimbas ==
The band's marimbas come from Father David Dargie of St. Francis Church in Cape Town, and were produced in 1979 by Brother Kurt Huwiler who worked in Umtata for the Lumko Institute. They are tuned to both Mpondo and Afro-diatonic scales.

== Leader's departure ==
The group continues to perform but without their former leader Dizu Plaatjies, who has started his own project entitled "Ibuyambo".

== Line-up (as of 2006) ==
- Simpiwe Matole - Soprano marimba, vocals, dance/acrobatics
- Mzwandile Qotoyi - Bass & piccolo marimba, African drums, percussion, vocals, and dance
- Michael 'Nkululeku' Ludonga - African drums, tenor marimba, vocals, dance
- Mandla Lande - African drums, percussion (djembe/congas), vocals, dance/acrobatics
- Blackie Zandisile Mbizela - Bass marimba, percussion, vocals, dance
- Nondzondelelo Fancy Galada - Lead and backing vocals, percussion, dance
- Mantombi Matotiyane - Lead and backing vocals, umrhumbhe, isitolotolo and dance
- Dave Mxolise Mayekana
- Risenga Makondo

== Discography ==
- Khawukhangele - 1982
- Heartbeat of Africa 'Uyandibiza' - Mountclare Productions - 1983
- The Pulse of Africa - Mountclare Productions - 1989
- An Image of Africa - Mountain Records AM242 - 1992
- Intsholo - Mountain Records AM282 - 1996
- Inyama - Mountain Records AM302 - 1997
- Drums For Tomorrow - MELT 2000 BW096 - 1998
- Vuyani - MELT 2000 BW 2143 - 2000
- An Image of Africa - Live in Cape Town - Mountain Records DVD AM 4546 - 2007
- Intsholo - Mountain Records re-issue - 2010
- Langa Nights - Mountain Records - 2013

Collaborations

- Give Praise Where Praise Is Deserved with Archbishop Desmond Tutu
- Shango - Juno Reactor - Electric Melt ELM8033 - 2000
- The Call - Alan Skidmore - Provocateur Records - PVC 1081 - 2001
- Ubizo - Alan Skidmore - Provocateur Records - PVC 1036 - 2003
- I Exist Because of You - Henrik Schwarz - IV15 - 2008
- Ku Kanjani EP - Âme & Amampondo - Innervisions - IV33 - 2011
- Nomabongo Electro - Amampondo feat. Murray Anderson - 2019
