= Isitolotolo =

South African variant of Jew's harp

Isitolotolo is the Xhosa name for the Jew's harp, a small musical instrument introduced to South Africa by European traders in the 19th century. The 19th century European traders brought metal Jaw’s harps to Africa. In South Africa, the instrument became popular with traditional African musicians because of its affordability and portability.

== Etymology ==
In isiXhosa, the Jew's Harp became known as "isitolotolo", a name derived from the word "setolotolo", which is a type of braced mouth bow played (by plucking) by the Basotho people of Lesotho, neighbors of the Xhosa. It may also be an onomatopoeic derivation from the trembling sound. A third explanation associates it with the word istolo (corrupted "store"), where the instrument was bought.

In Southern Swaziland and western Maputaland, the instrument is called isitweletwele.

== Playing techniques ==
In the Eastern Cape, isitolotolo players use a specialized technique developed by Xhosa umrhubhe (mouth-bow) players, who perform while simultaneously whistling. Players of the isitolotolo use their mouths as a resonating chamber, shaping their oral cavity to emphasize the instrument's overtones, a technique also found in umrhubhe playing. The resonating overtones of the instrument are created by shaping the mouth in a similar way to mouth-bow technique, allowing indigenous people to easily adapt to the European Jew's Harps. A specialized form of playing involves simultaneous whistling while plucking the isitolotolo, creating a unique soundscape of layered resonances. This technique, while difficult to master, highlights the creative integration of foreign instruments into Xhosa musical traditions.

Isitweletwele players make the melody based on the word articulation, taking an advantage of local tonal languages. Advanced players may enhance the melody with other language peculiarities, such as clicks and breathiness.

== Notable practitioners ==
The isitolotolo is still played by a growing number of musicians, both young and old. Some notable players include:

- The late Madosini, a well-known practitioner of Xhosa musical traditions.
- Mantombi Matotiyana, an elder respected for her preservation of indigenous music. A short clip of Mantombi playing isitolotolo can be seen here.
- Madala Kunene, a South African musician known for his contributions to African music.
- Mpho Molikeng, a versatile instrumentalist and cultural advocate from Lesotho.
- Mabeleng Moholo, a lesser-known but respected player of the isitolotolo.
- Mosoeu Ketlele, Zanele Ndlovu, Matlali Kheoana, and Nkosenathi Ernie Koela are also recognized for their contributions to keeping this instrument alive in contemporary settings.

== Historical and cultural context ==
Incorporating the Jew's harp into Xhosa culture reflects a broader pattern of adaptation where African musicians would integrate foreign instruments and playing styles while maintaining traditional forms of expression. The portability and accessibility of the isitolotolo made it particularly appealing, especially in rural areas. However, its success within the Xhosa community owes much to its compatibility with the indigenous mouth-bow tradition, which uses similar mouth and resonance techniques.

According to David Rycroft's study on friction chordophones in southeastern Africa, the use of mouth-resonated instruments like the isitolotolo, which mirrors indigenous techniques of Xhosa mouth-bow playing, exemplifies how traditional sound-producing methods were maintained even as new instruments were introduced. Rycroft observed similar mouth-resonated techniques among the Mpondo and Xhosa, where both the isitolotolo and mouth-bows were used.

== Contemporary use ==
The isitolotolo continues to be played by contemporary musicians in South Africa. There is growing interest in reviving and sustaining traditional African music, and the isitolotolo is part of this cultural resurgence. Its small size, rich harmonic possibilities, and connection to both local and cross-border traditions make it a unique and significant instrument in South African musical history.
