= Umrhubhe musical bow =

South African musical instrument

The Umrhubhe (pronounced /umˈr̥uɓe/), a mouth bow, is a traditional indigenous instrument of the AmaXhosa in South Africa. It is played by creating friction, rubbing the string with a reed or scraped stick, while using the mouth as a resonator. Umrhubhe holds cultural significance among the Xhosa people, playing an important role in both social and musical education.

== History and cultural significance ==
The umrhubhe instrument has been part of Xhosa tradition for generations and is particularly associated with young women and girls. It was traditionally used in social gatherings and rituals, such as umtshotsho, where uninitiated Xhosa boys and girls participated in music and dance. Beyond its musical role, umrhubhe also played a part in transmitting cultural values and life lessons. According to renowned umrhubhe player, Madosini, playing umrhubhe taught respect, discipline, and ubuntu (humanity). When called upon by an elder, young people were taught to stop playing and respond respectfully, reinforcing social values. Madosini emphasized its educational role, describing it as her "school of life." She shared how girls were taught to play by their elders and, in turn, taught the younger generation.

The instrument was traditionally played by young women, especially girls, but was later taught to and played by men. There is a growing interest in the instrument in educational settings, where students are being taught to play, construct, and perform on umrhubhe as an ensemble instrument.

== Construction ==
The umrhubhe is made of light wood or well-seasoned cane to form the intonga (stick), which is about one and a half meters long. The sapling is first debarked and bent into a bow shape, with the string typically made from brass wire, though historically, it was woven from twisted strands of ox-tail hair. Madosini describes her bow-making process, using branches from the umbangandlala tree for the bow stave. For the string, she processes brass bangle wire (umliza) by heating and straightening it.

== Playing techniques ==
There are multiple playing techniques for the umrhubhe:

- Without whistling: The player uses the mouth as a resonator and creator of overtones.
- With whistling: Known as umrhubhe nomlozi, this technique is achieved by either blowing or sucking air while bowing the instrument. A melody is produced through a combination of the whistling sound, the harmonics resonated in the player's mouth, and the fundamental tones created by the touch-and-release technique applied to the string.
- Mouth and throat techniques: As described by Madosini, the sound is produced using a combination of mouth positioning and movements of the throat and larynx. She highlights the role of the larynx in amplifying the overtones and controlling the melody.

== Social and cultural role ==
Historically, the umrhubhe was not just a musical instrument but a transmitter of cultural knowledge. It played a significant role in social gatherings such as imfihlelo, a game where participants were guided by the sounds of umrhubhe to find hidden objects. This practice demonstrated the instrument's integration into daily life and socialization processes.

The umrhubhe is now used in music education as part of ensemble performances alongside other traditional instruments, such as the uhadi and isitolotolo. For example, at Walter Sisulu University, songs like "Mafeda" are taught to students as part of ensemble performances, providing opportunities to engage with Xhosa musical traditions.

== The Umrhubhe in Western art music ==
Composers of Western art music have increasingly integrated the umrhubhe into their compositions, blending indigenous African sounds with contemporary Western music. One notable example is Michael Blake's 2013 work, Ukhukhalisa Umrhubhe ("to play the umrhubhe" or "to make the umrhubhe cry"), commissioned by the Festival d’Automne à Paris. Featuring the soloist Mantombi, Blake composed a piece for electronic tape and live umrhubhe, focusing on Mantombi's improvisation skills based on her musical tradition. The six-month-long collaboration at the Stellenbosch Conservatoire of Music involved creating recorded "models" instead of traditional notation, allowing Mantombi to shape her solo part. Blake integrated various elements, such as her vocal recordings, uhadi accompaniment, MIDI keyboard, percussion tracks, and processed sounds, into the tape part. This collaborative work, performed in France and later broadcast on France Musique, highlights the flexibility of the umrhubhe within intercultural musical settings.

Similarly, Hans Huyssen's The Songs of Madosini (2002) features the umrhubhe as part of a broader intercultural dialogue. Commissioned by Robert Brooks for the International Chamber Music Festival of Cervo, the piece was created for an ensemble of clarinet, string quartet, and a narrator, centering on Madosini, an esteemed Mpondomise musician. Huyssen's composition, described as a "modern-day intsomi," intertwines storytelling with the use of both European and traditional Mpondomise instruments, including the uhadi, umrhubhe, and isitolotolo. The seven-movement work is processual and narrative, recounting Madosini's journey from rural origins to urban life. Huyssen's musical commentary "frames" Madosini's original songs by juxtaposing European and African idioms, ultimately facilitating a dialogue that evolves into a self-reflective performance.

== Notable umrhubhe musicians ==
- Madosini: A master umrhubhe player, internationally recognized for her role in reviving and popularizing the instrument.
- Nogcinile Yekani: Known for her advanced whistling techniques and polyphonic playing style.
- Nongangekho Dywili: Nofinishi Dywili's daughter, who developed a unique style of playing umrhubhe, combining overtone melodies with whistling.

== Additional reading ==
- Blake, Michael (2013). "Ukhukhalisa Umrhubhe". herri. Retrieved 18 September 2024.
- Dargie, D. (2011). 'The Xhosa umrhubhe mouthbow: An extraordinary musical instrument'. African Music: Journal of the International Library of African Music, 9(1), 33–55.
- Dlamini, S. (2004). 'The Role of the Umrhubhe Bow as Transmitter of Cultural Knowledge Among the AmaXhosa: An Interview with Latozi ‘Madosini’ Mpahleni'. Journal of the Musical Arts in Africa, 1, 138–160.
- Dontsa, L. (2008). 'From the Museum to the Music Classroom: Teaching the Umrhubhe as an Ensemble Instrument'. International Journal of Music Education, 26(2), 177–190.
- Huyssen, Hans. Composing (in) contemporary South Africa theoretical and musical responses to complexity.
