= The Bow Project =

The Bow Project is a double album of studio recordings by the Nightingale String Quartet of Denmark, and historic field recordings of uhadi songs by Nofinishi Dywili from Ngqoko (Eastern Cape, South Africa), released in 2010. Each of the twelve string quartets, by a different composer, is based on a song by Dywili.

== Concept ==
The Bow Project invited South African, and later Faroese, composers to transcribe and paraphrase or reimagine, for the classical string quartet, the uhadi songs of Nofinishi Dywili. Composers based their transcription on the field recordings of ethnomusicologist Dr Dave Dargie, made between 1980 and 2002. The medium of the string quartet was seen as providing a perfect bridge between the world of traditional bow music and the world of new classical music. The Bow Project was launched at the New Music Indaba in 2002, and new works premiered at subsequent festivals. A South African tour in 2009 was followed by the CD production. Each concert included performances of the uhadi songs interpreted by musicians of the next generation, namely Madosini and Mantombi Matotiyana. The project is dedicated to the memory of Nofinishi Dywili who died in 2002. According to Dargie, Dywili possessed "exceptional rhythmic skill… whatever of the marvellous and complex rhythms there were in any of the songs – 10-vs-8 cross-rhythms or whatever – Nofinishi would also effortlessly bring in greater rhythmic complexity, making the songs even more wonderful."

== Compositions ==
The Bow Project contains 26 compositions: ten string quartets by South African, and two by Faroese, composers; twelve performances of eight different uhadi songs; a short electronic bowscape; and a studio remix of one of the quartets. The compositions represent a broad range of contemporary compositional styles drawing on jazz and blues, rock, choral music, African traditional music, European new music including electronica, and American experimental music.

== Instrumentation ==
In addition to the string quartet, two variants of the one-string calabash bow from South Africa can be heard, most notably the Xhosa uhadi from the Eastern Cape and the Zulu ughubu from KwaZulu-Natal. The ughubu (as well as some percussion) is featured on Track 6 of the first CD, in combination with the string quartet.

== Reception ==
Gwen Ansell, in the Mail & Guardian, felt that the "project reinvigorates traditional bow music", while Ashraf Jamal, wrote in artsouthafrica: "Part trance, part devotion, part joy in the free-fall then sudden hovering of sound, the experience provided an ek-stasis, literally an outer-body experience."

== Track listing ==
=== CD 1 ===
1. Michael Blake String Quartet No 3 (Nofinishi) 5:21
2. Mokale Koapeng Komeng 3:43
3. Paul Hanmer Ntwazana 6:30
4. Robert Fokkens Libalel'ilanga (The Sun is Scorching the Earth) 7:36
5. Lloyd Prince Lines 2:24
6. Sazi Dlamini and Jürgen Bräuninger Jiwé 5:29
7. Kristian Blak String Quartet No 5 (Lady Frere) 9:26
8. Matteo Fargion String Quartet No 4 3:33
9. Atli Petersen Virtual Flow Snakes (String Quartet No 2) 8:35
10. Martin Scherzinger My Friend, the Ugly One 6:17
11. Julia Raynham Latshon'ilanga 4:20
12. Theo Herbst UMhala Wasetywaleni, Wat Maak Jy? 7:11
13. Jürgen Bräuninger Tsiki's Got a Headache (bowscape) 2:33

=== CD 2 ===
1. Traditional/Nofinishi Dywili Inxembula (2002 version) 4:23
2. Trad/Dywili Umyeyezolo 2:56
3. Trad/Dywili UTtsiki 2:03
4. Trad/Dywili Latshon'ilanga 4:24
5. Trad/Dywili Umzi KaMzwandile 2:55
6. Trad/Dywili UTsiki (group song) 2:31
7. Trad/Dywili Umzi KaMzwandile (group song) 1:42
8. Trad/Dywili Nguwe L'udal'inyakanyaka 2:07
9. Trad/Dywili Umagungqel'indawo 2:50
10. Trad/Dywili Inxembula (1980 version) 6:55
11. Trad/Dywili Latshon'ilanga (group song) 3:04
12. Trad/Dywili UMhala Wasetywaleni 4:17
13. Aryan Kaganof Anahat (remix of Michael Blake's String Quartet No 3) 7:35

== Musicians ==
- Gunvohr Sihm – violin
- Josefine Dalsgaard – violin
- Marie Louise Broholt Jensen – viola
- Louisa Schwab – cello
- Guest Artist: Sazi Dlamini – ugubhu, percussion, vocals (Jiwé)
- Nofinishi Dywili – voice, uhadi

== Production ==
- Recorded 29 and 30 July 2009 at Sonic Arts, Grahamstown, South Africa (Nightingale String Quartet)
  - Recorded, edited and mastered by Corinne Cooper
  - Produced by Michael Blake
- Jiwé recorded at Gerald LaPierre Studio, Durban, 23 July 2009
- Tsiki's Got a Headache recorded at Gerald LaPierre Studio, Durban, June 2005
  - Recorded, edited and mastered by Jürgen Bräuninger
- UMhala Wasetywaleni, Wat Maak Jy? recorded at University of Stellenbosch, South Africa, September 2009
  - Recorded and edited by Theo Herbst
  - Mastered by Tim Lengfeld
- Anahat recorded at Sonic Arts, Grahamstown, July 2009; remixed at African Noise Foundation, Cape Town, August 2009; and mastered at Milestone Studios, Cape Town, August 2009
  - Recorded and remixed by Aryan Kaganof
  - Mastered by Kalahari Surfers
- Nofinishi Dywili recorded at Old Lumko, Eastern Cape, South Africa, 1988 by Dave Dargie except
  - Track 1: February 2002, Fort Hare, Eastern Cape
  - Tracks 6, 7, 11: 1998, Dywili's home, Ngqoko, Eastern Cape
  - Track 10: 1980, Dywili's home, Ngqoko;
  - Digitally remastered by Corinne Cooper
