= Dizu Plaatjies =

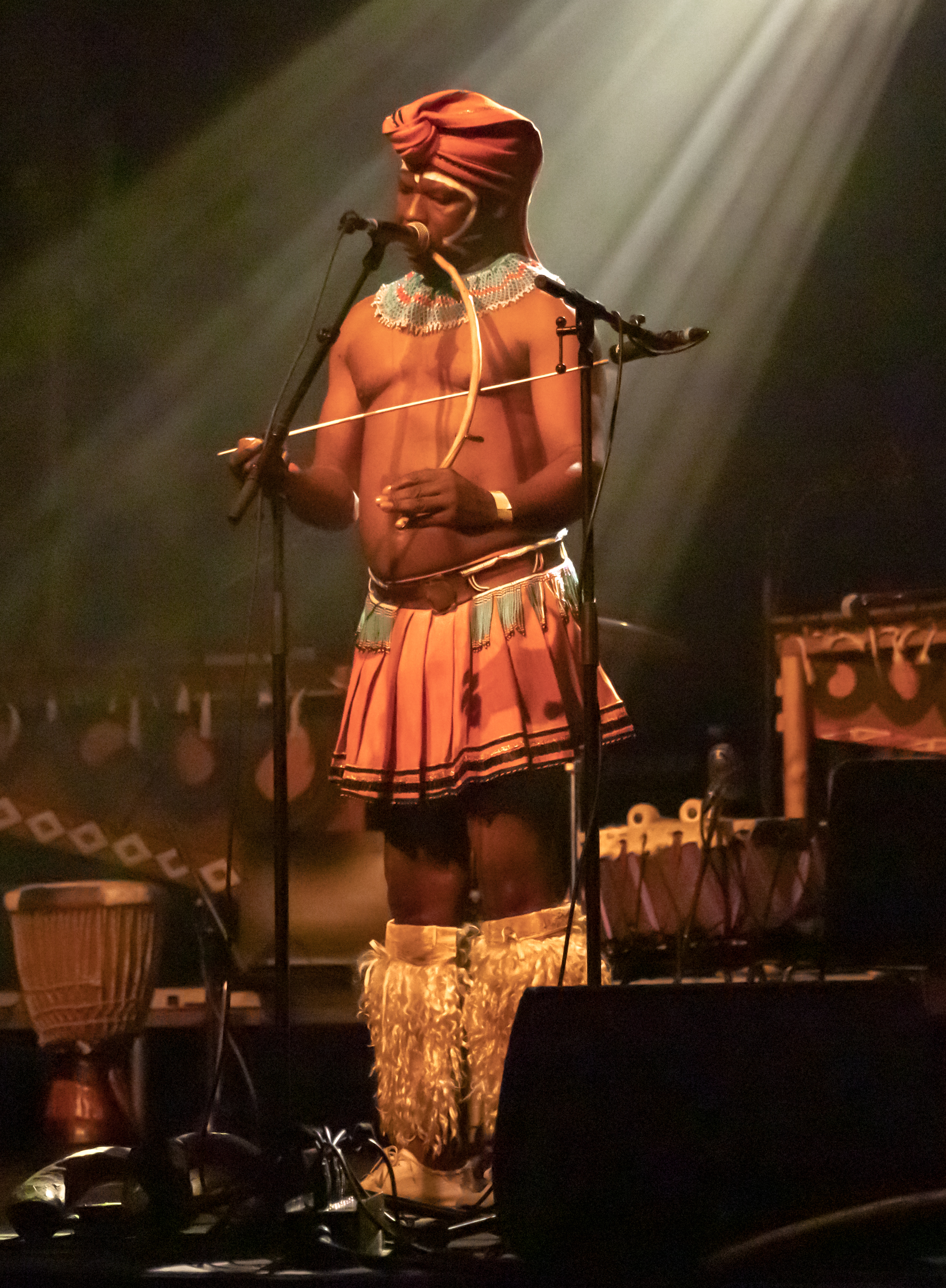
Dizu Plaatjies performing in Helsinki, November 2018.

Dizu Plaatjies (born 5 February 1959, Lusikisiki, Pondoland, South Africa) is a Xhosa musician best known for being the founder and former leader of the South African group, Amampondo. He is a graduate of the South African College of Music, University of Cape Town where he lectures in African Music.

Plaatjies started the percussion group Amampondo during the late 1970s. The group began with making music on the streets, but achieved international fame in the 1980s. The climax for the group was performing at the Wembley Stadium during the Nelson Mandela 70th Birthday Tribute. The stage was set for Amamondo to conquer the world, and they had already been booked for a world tour, but the anti-apartheid campaign in exile from South Africa banned their performances for the next four years. During these difficult years, he received support from the Scandinavian countries.

Since leaving Amampondo Plaatjies has started a new ensemble called Ibuyambo. Dizu and the new group have presented numerous shows in a number of European countries, and perform regularly in South Africa.

Plaatjies is the son of an African traditional healer and late lady teacher Ntombiza, has himself been initiated in the Xhosa/Pondo tribal tradition. His interest in African percussion music has taken him to numerous countries on the continent with the result that he now owns a substantial collection of handmade musical instruments from sub-Saharan Africa. His latest recordings, made for the label Mountain Records, are titled Ibuyambo (2005), African Kings (2008) and Ubuntu — The Common String (2015), and illustrate this knowledge and interest. The last two releases won him SAMA Awards.

He was married to his partner Vuyo Mbewu on 27 September 2008. The couple have two children Ukwanda and Azile. Plaatjies has 4 children.

== Selected discography ==
- Ibuyambo (2003)
- African Kings (2008)
- Ubuntu — The Common String (2015)
