= Mass media in Jersey =

Mass media in Jersey consist of several different types of communications media: television, radio, newspapers, magazines, and Internet-based Web sites.

== Broadcasting ==
The Frémont Point transmitting station is a facility for FM and television transmission at Frémont in Saint John, Jersey.

=== Television ===
Local terrestrial television in Jersey is provided by ITV Channel Television (part of the ITV network) and BBC Channel Islands (an opt-out service from BBC South West), both of these have local broadcast studios, production teams, presenters and other staff. Many other off-island stations are available, which are mostly the same as those available in United Kingdom.

ITV Channel Television – the longer-serving of the two services – produces regional programming for the Islands, including a flagship nightly news programme, ITV News Channel TV, which is supplemented by shorter news bulletins seven days a week. Other programmes previously shown include a twice-weekly sports magazine show Report Sport, the long-running children's series Puffin's Pla(i)ce and local documentaries.

BBC Channel Islands News is an opt-out service for the Channel Islands, broadcast from the BBC Radio Jersey studios in St Helier at 6:30 pm (during the first half of Spotlight) and at 10:25 pm (after the BBC News at Ten) each weeknight on BBC One.

Jersey is depicted in the detective programme Bergerac.

=== Radio ===
Local radio in Jersey is broadcast on FM by BBC Radio Jersey, Soleil Radio and Channel 103. Both also on Channel Island DAB mux since 1 August 2021

Bailiwick Radio broadcasts two music services, Classics and Hits, 24 hours a day online. It is also available on DAB+ Channel Island mux. and through Apple and Android apps and on TuneIn.

Radio Youth FM, an internet radio station run by young people aged 12 – 24 is also active in the island and broadcasts up to 10 shows each week.

Jersey used to be served by the Normandy-based radio station Contact 94.

== Internet ==
The Bailiwick Express is Jersey's solitary online news website which concentrates on hard news delivered swiftly, and is supported by classified advertising, primarily of vehicles, employment vacancies, and property.

== Print ==
=== Newspapers ===
The Jersey Evening Post, is the main printed source of local news and official notices. Its daily average net circulation was reported as 17,912 copies in 2012.

The newspaper features a weekly Jèrriais column accompanied by English-language précis.

=== Magazines ===
Lifestyle magazines include Gallery Magazine (monthly) and The Jersey Life (monthly).

Les Nouvelles Chroniques du Don Balleine is a quarterly literary magazine in Jèrriais.

20/20 magazine is the island's only annual personal finance magazine; Global Assets the island's online quarterly international offshore finance magazine is also produced by the same company.

Connect magazine is a bi-monthly business title from the same stable as The Bailiwick Express.
