= BBC Channel Islands =

BBC Channel Islands may refer to:

- BBC Channel Islands News
- BBC Radio Jersey
- BBC Radio Guernsey

== See also ==
- CBBC Channel, a children's television channel operated by the BBC
