= Contact 94 =

- Lessay; France
- Broadcast area: Normandy and Channel Islands
- Frequencies: 94.4, 93.8, 94.6 and 97.7 MHz

Programming
- Languages: English and French

History
- First air date: 5 September 1988
- Last air date: 29 November 1991

Contact 94 was a radio station that broadcast from Lessay in Northern France to Normandy and the Channel Islands between September 1988 and November 1991. The station broadcast on various frequencies during its time on air, including 94.4 FM, 93.8 FM, 94.6 FM and 97.7 FM.

== Launch ==
Contact 94 launched at 6 am GMT on 5 September 1988 by former Radio Caroline disc jockey, Kevin Turner. The first song played was "Good Day Sunshine" by The Beatles.

== History ==
Whilst the station was to broadcast Radio Nova, via satellite, overnight and the equipment had arrived in advance of the launch, the engineer who had been due to install the equipment was stuck in Jersey due to a heavy fog. On the opening night therefore Paul Easton broadcast between 11 pm and 3 am, with a sustaining music tape filling the remaining hours until resumption of live programming the following morning.

Contact 94 carried the UK sustaining service Supergold overnight from November 1988 until February 1989.

On 3 February 1989 the station went off air on 97.7 MHz. Rumours surfaced that this was an enforced closure by the French police pending an investigation by the authorities regarding whether the station was a 'pirate'. It was decided by regional courts that the station was broadcasting illegally and transmission equipment was confiscated. An appeal was successful in overturning this ruling and the station returned to the air.

The station used a 950 MHz link between the studios at Lessay and its transmitter and one humorous incident in the stations history was when this signal was overcome by the ETACS analogue mobile phone signals on the island operated by Jersey Telecom in collaboration with Cellnet, the result being that some local mobile telephone calls were in fact broadcast on Contact 94's FM frequencies.

== Broadcast ==
The programming schedules of Contact 94 were published in both the CTV Times and the Jersey Evening Post.

=== Studios ===
The station had a complex of two studios, based above the La Campagnette restaurant in Lessay, Normandy. The building was owned by station backer Alain Tardiff.

=== Frequencies ===
During its time on the air, Contact 94 broadcast on various frequencies. The original frequency was 94.4 MHz, but the station later changed frequencies and was at various points heard on 93.8, 94.6 and 97.7 MHz. The reason for these multiple changes was never given. The 94.6 MHz frequency was the most problematic, being very close to BBC Radio 3's Jersey frequency of 94.8 MHz.

The station broadcast using an 80 kW transmitter.

== Output ==
The station broadcast twenty four hours a day at launch and this was a combination of twenty hours in English, with the remaining four hours broadcast in French. English broadcasts were produced by the station between 6 am and 8 pm, French transmissions followed this and the overnight hours were provided via satellite by Radio Nova.

=== News programming ===
News bulletins were provided hourly from launch and were originally in conjunction with Independent Radio News. From March 1990 news output was provided in conjunction with the short-lived Astra satellite service of ITN Radio News.

=== Advertising ===
Local advertising sales for the station were originally handled by a company set up by a former director of the Guernsey-based marketing and advertising agency Wallace Barnaby; Malcolm Corrigan. Corrigan also worked for Contact 94. While national (UK) sales for the station were handled by Independent Radio Sales, a subsidiary of Crown Communications, who also dealt with advertising sales for other 'off-shore' stations; Manx Radio and Radio Gibraltar. IRS even went as far as offering a special rate card for those wishing to advertise on the 'offshore' stations they represented. In August 1991, the station switched its national sales representation to a new company The Satellite and Radio Sales Company which had been set up by Gary Miele, former Sales Director at Kiss FM.

=== Jingle packages ===
- Package 1 (1988) – Alfasound
- Breakthrough (1990) - JAM Creative Productions

The station's jingle package was a resing of the 'Latest Hits, Greatest Memories' jingle package, originally created for Beacon Radio in England.

== Staff ==
=== Presenters ===
Included:

- Dave Asher
- John Bennett
- Phil (Hopcyn) Bird
- Danielle Berrou
- David Brown
- Max Buchannon
- Fabrice Collet

- "Steaming" Steve Cromby
- Alex Dyke
- Paul Easton
- Gavin Ford
- Paul Gledhill
- Richard Harding
- Rob Harrison

- François Head
- Caroline Martin
- Mark Matthews
- Liam Mayclem
- Neil McLeod
- Colin Nixon
- Chris Pearson

- Alex Ritson
- Steve Ryan
- Steve Satan
- Tim Smith
- Kevin Turner
- Jon Tyler

=== Station Staff ===
At launch, the station staff were led by Peter MacFarlane who had previously worked for the Portsmouth and Southampton Independent Local Radio station; Ocean Sound.

By the time the station closed in 1991, the sales director was Chris Kirby. Other station staff included Malcolm Corrigan, Colin Cawthaw and Jon Myers who was one of the station controllers.

== Ownership ==
Contact 94 was owned by an Anglo-French consortium, whose original members included the Jersey-based businessman, travel agent, tour operator and hotelier Stephen Clipp and the French restaurateur Alain Tardiff. Clipp withdrew from the consortium during 1990.

== Closure ==
In November 1991 the Radio Authority advertised an Independent Local Radio license for Jersey, with a proposed frequency of 101.3 MHz. Those running the station at the time decided to enter the bidding process for the license and as a result, the decision was made to close Contact 94. Contact 94 ceased broadcasting on 29 November 1991.

== Contact 94 after closure ==
After closure the equipment was removed from the La Campagnette studios, although apart from this they remained intact even some seventeen years later.

=== ILR Franchise Bid ===
Those running the station had decided to bid for the Independent Local Radio license for Jersey and in March 1992, along with three other competitors (one had already withdrawn) they submitted their bid under the name of Jersey Music Radio. The Jersey Music Radio bid was led by property developer David Overland, who was joined by local resident John Billington, Paul Roberts of Hamptons International, Winston Allen, Derek Young, Chris Tanguy and, Chris Kirby and Jon Myers, both formerly of Contact 94.

Rival bidders were Wave 101 FM, a group led by former Barclays Bank director Terry Lavery and including radio presenters Keith Skues and John Uphoff who would later go on to appear on both Channel 103 and BBC Radio Jersey; Jersey 1st FM, led by Senator John Rothwell and including David Gardner a director of Moray Firth Radio, former Coventry City chairman John Poynton and the singer/songwriter Gilbert O'Sullivan; Channel Radio Ltd, a team led by Deputy Robin Rumboll with inout from former BBC Radio Jersey Station Manager Mike Warr and Gerald Durrell; and Jersey FM, a team led comprising directors drawn from local television station CTV and Radio Investments Limited who were one of the founders of Capital Radio in London.

Despite a petition being signed in support of the application by Contact 94 fans, the license was awarded to rival bidder; Channel Radio Limited in May, and they began broadcasting on an amended frequency of 103.7 MHz in October 1992 as Channel 103.

=== Internet streaming ===
On 12 August 2013 an online radio station began broadcasting at https://web.archive.org/web/20140630174137/http://www.contact94.net/ and established a Facebook page at https://www.facebook.com/contact94. The online station offers a variety of different music streams themed by decades. The station subsequently rebranded as 'Bailiwick Radio', changing its web address to www.bailiwickradio.com

In September 2018 the previous owner of Contact 94 launched an internet radio station Contact Classic Hits.

== See also ==
- Channel 103
- BBC Radio Jersey
- Island FM
- BBC Radio Guernsey
