= Craig Rich =

British broadcaster and journalist (1938–2024)

Craig Rich (3 February 1938 – 1 December 2024) was a British meteorologist, journalist, radio presenter and television presenter. He was regarded as a prominent stalwart at BBC as he was regarded as the longest-serving regional weather forecaster of BBC. He was well known for documenting and articulating his thought process on the Sunday Times Golden Globe Race in 1968.

== Life and career ==
Rich was born in Plymouth on 3 February 1938. He plied his trade by joining the Merchant Navy soon after leaving Devonport High School for Boys when he was only 16 years old. Reportedly, he went to sea as a cadet with Ellerman Lines at the age of 16. He built up his career aspirations by developing a keen interest in meteorology and weather forecasting. He specialised himself as a fully qualified master mariner and an extra master mariner, before embarking on a career oriented with media aspects.

He was appointed the navigation advisor to The Sunday Times for the segment regarding the Sunday Times Golden Globe Race in 1968. He received spotlight and acclaim for exposing the true story behind yachtsman Donald Crowhurst, whose disappearance from his trimaran in the mid-Atlantic was shrouded in mystery, before being confirmed to have committed suicide. Rich gathered and compiled conclusive evidence confirming that Donald Crowhurst had apparently lied about his progress in the 1968 Round the World Yacht Race, and Rich uncovered the truth about Crowhurst having fabricated entries in his log books during the race. Rich's research and insightful, comprehensive work on his fact-finding mission to figure out the infamous Crowhurst's disappearance in the 1968 race was deemed as a tipping point to solve the mysteries about the case. Rich also shared his expertise on the experience he had gathered from his role as the navigation advisor during the 1968 Round the World Yacht Race, by contributing to Nicholas Tomalin and Ron Hall’s book, The Strange Voyage of Donald Crowhurst.

In 1978 he joined the BBC Spotlight team in Plymouth and he served in the position for a duration of 25 years. He joined the BBC as its first regional weather forecaster. Although his job requirements initially specified to cover weather forecasting at Spotlight, he was fast-tracked to provide his knowledge expertise in other news stories circulated in the agenda of action items including 1979 Fastnet Race and the 1981 Penlee lifeboat disaster. The colleagues who worked along with him at the BBC insisted that Craig Rich would bring a sense of humor and laugh riot in the newsroom even amidst stressful circumstances.

He conducted lectures on his interested specific research areas including navigation and meteorology at the Sir John Cass School of Navigation for a stint stretching for approximately five years. He also served as the head of the Department of Shipping and Transport at Plymouth Polytechnic for ten years, where he engaged in the dual roles as a lecturer and as a tutor. In 1988, he decided to quit teaching and developed a mindset to give his firm attention on television and radio broadcasts, instead of juggling his commitments between teaching and broadcasting.

His media portfolio includes his work as presenter in BBC's coverage of the total eclipse in 1999 and he was a central figure spearheading the lineup of programmes for BBC Radio Devon. During the 1980s, he presented That’s Rich, a lineup of regional programmes. He was named as the commentator for the 1998 Tall Ships Race, where he interviewed the Princess Royal as part of BBC South West’s live coverage proceedings.

Rich died on 1 December 2024, at the age of 86.
