= ITV Channel Television =

ITV service for the Channel Islands

- Logo used since 2013

- Type: Region of television network
- Branding: ITV1
- First air date: 1 September 1962; 63 years ago
- TV transmitters: Fremont Point
- Headquarters: St Helier, Jersey
- Broadcast area: Channel Islands
- Owner: ITV plc
- Dissolved: lost on-air identity on 14 January 2013 (now known as ITV1 at all times)
- Former names: Channel Television (1962–2011)
- Picture format: 1080i HDTV, downscaled to 576i for SDTV
- Affiliation: ITV
- Official website: itv.com/channel
- Language: English

ITV Channel Television, previously Channel Television, is a British television station which has served as the ITV contractor for the Channel Islands since 1962. It is based in Jersey and broadcasts regional programmes for insertion into the network ITV schedule. Until November 2011, Channel Television was one of four ITV companies independent from ITV plc alongside the two STV regions in Scotland and UTV in Northern Ireland. The station has been owned by ITV plc since 2012.

Until the takeover by ITV plc, Channel Television also had a responsibility to ensure independent productions for ITV complied with the regulator Ofcom's broadcasting rules. Until the regulations changed, Ofcom could only impose a maximum fine of 5% of the revenue of the company responsible for compliance, and as Channel was by far the smallest ITV contractor, this minimised the potential fines to which ITV as a whole would be exposed. Channel handled compliance for programmes including The X Factor, Midsomer Murders and the British Comedy Awards.

The station's main competitor is the BBC, which operates an opt-out of the South West England news programme BBC Spotlight.

== History ==
=== Launch ===
Channel Television was awarded the licence for the islands in 1960 by the then regulator the Independent Television Authority (ITA). However, the ITA pointed out that the Television Act 1954 (2 & 3 Eliz. 2. c. 55) that established ITV did not include provision for the Channel Islands and as a result, if the ITA was to operate an ITV service there, it would have to be permitted by means of extending the act to the islands with an Order in Council, which was granted as the Television Act 1954 (Channel Islands) Order 1961 (SI 1961/2039). In addition, the new station faced difficulties connecting to the rest of the ITV network. The solution was the construction of a microwave relay station on the northern island of Alderney that would connect with another ITV station, initially Westward Television. At first, the station received difficulties in getting permission for the new mast, but these were overcome in September 1961.

Channel Television finally went on the air on 1 September 1962, the 16th and penultimate ITV station to launch (WWN, the 17th station, launched two weeks later in North & West Wales but collapsed less than two years after launch). It served the smallest population of any ITV station with only around 150,000 people in 54,000 households.

=== 1960s and 1970s ===
The size of Channel's audience made the station initially vulnerable to any disputes and disturbances to the ITV network as a whole. When technicians went on strike in the summer of 1968, Channel was the only station not to be affected. While Channel did survive the 1968 strike, it was badly affected by the Three-Day Week of 1973-4 which restricted the hours of television stations to save electricity. However, Channel managed to escape the large ITV strike that blacked out the rest of the network in August–October 1979, on the same understanding as before. Channel managed to provide a service based mainly on films, imports, extended local news coverage and regional programming, with the biggest problem coming from difficulties in transporting film to the Jersey studios.

Channel also made advances during this period to enhance its service. In 1970, Channel formalised its relationship with South West England ITV franchisee holder Westward Television allowing a greater share of programming between the two franchise holders. Channel finally converted to colour television on Monday 26 July 1976, the last region to do so (five years after the next to last contractor, Grampian Television, began colour transmissions) and seven years after the first. Delays were due to the cost of upgrading the studios and purchasing new equipment and the need to provide a stronger network feed as the region's northernmost areas got better signals from Southern and Thames/London Weekend. All local programmes were being made in colour by the following year with Channel donating all of its old cameras to local museums. Just before the 1979 ITV strike began, Channel became only the second TV station in Europe to introduce electronic news-gathering (ENG) to its local news operation (BBC1 had used ENG for London-originated news since at least 1978), ending the use of film.

=== 1980s and 1990s ===
The new decade began with a new franchise round for the islands in which Channel was unopposed. However, there was to be a change of franchise in the South West of England with Westward being replaced by Television South West (TSW), requiring a new agreement with TSW. However, in 1986 Channel changed from whom it sourced its network feed, instead changing to Television South (TVS) which served the South and South East of England from Southampton and Maidstone. A side-effect of this change was a disruption to serials airing on the station in the afternoon due to the serial having begun on TVS at a different time to TSW so that they were at a different point through the serial's run. For instance, Channel had to miss over 100 episodes of The Young Doctors, the first nine episodes of Prisoner Cell Block H which had been screened on TVS in 1985, and it had to re-show 60 episodes of Sons and Daughters as TVS was behind TSW. And rather than introduce its own overnight service when this programming area began in 1988, Channel simulcast TVS's night time schedule, something it continued to do when TVS was replaced by Meridian in 1993.

During this period, the station began to invest in technology. A local service for the Oracle teletext service began in 1981, delivering local news and information. Local news was also enhanced with the first underwater ENG camera, created for footage of a Roman shipwreck, and a year later with the introduction of a computerised newsroom, the first of the ITV regions to convert.

In 1991, the station faced a new challenge: that of a new franchise round. Following the Broadcasting Act of the previous year, the allocation of regional franchises had changed to become a blind auction in which the franchise went to the highest bidder. This process was further complicated by a quality threshold, in which a higher bidder could be disqualified for having a poor business plan or if its high bid would result in a lack of funds for the programmes themselves. In the franchise round, Channel bid £1,000 (the lowest bid accepted) and was out-bid by challenge consortium CI3. CI3, formed in part of ex-Channel employees, bid £102,000, but was disqualified as it failed to pass the quality threshold. Channel had won the right to continue broadcasting beyond 1993. As another consequence of the franchise round, Channel began local news broadcasts during breakfast time as part of GMTV's new service.

In 1996, Channel began a subtitling service for its local programmes.

=== 2000 to present ===
Logo used from 1999 to 2006

In 2001, Channel was bought by the Yattendon Investment Trust, although the buy-out did not lead to a noticeable change on screen. The buy-out occurred at the same time as the full scale amalgamation of ITV with many of the regional franchises becoming owned by one of four consortia: Carlton, Granada, United News and Media and Scottish Media Group. Channel subsequently remained one of two franchises to be not part of a consortium (the other being UTV). When Carlton and Granada (which by then also included the United News and Media franchises) merged to form ITV plc in 2004, Channel remained separate from this new merger. Channel's independence from ITV plc also saw it retain its regional non-news programmes when other regions saw this type of programming dropped.

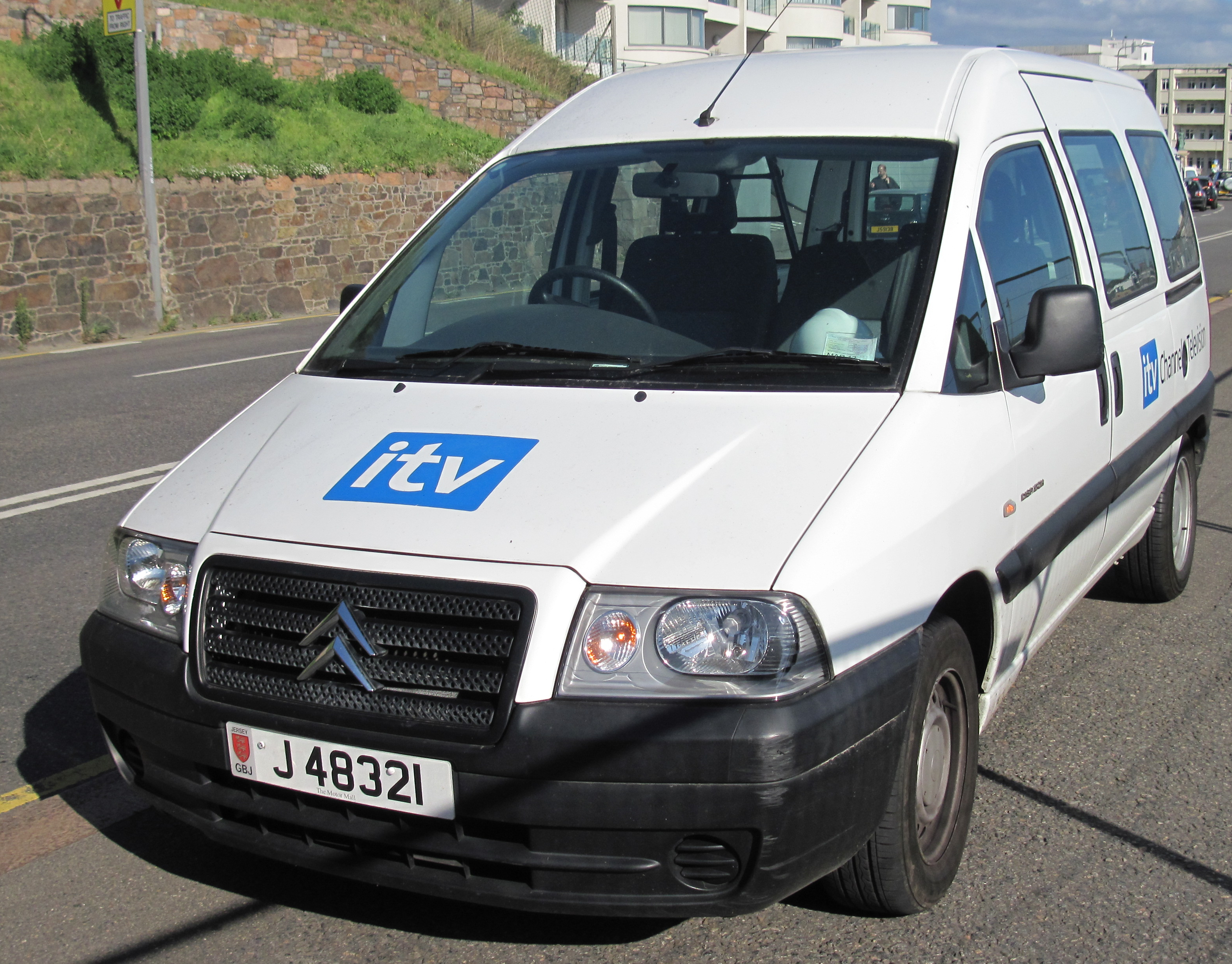
One of ITV Channel Television's vehicles as seen in 2011.

Despite being a small station, Channel took on a role in ensuring that ITV's independently produced programmes complied with the UK's guidelines and laws. On 18 May 2008, The Sunday Times newspaper reported that ITV plc was using Channel's compliance role as a loophole, enabling it to lessen a possible fine for breaching Ofcom regulations during the 2005 British Comedy Awards. During the programme Robbie Williams presented an award to Ant and Dec which should have gone to Catherine Tate who had received a greater number of phone-in votes. For this breach, Ofcom fined the broadcaster, which was worked out as a maximum of 5% of the offending broadcaster's advertising revenue. However, as the programme was independently produced Channel is seen as the offending broadcaster for not ensuring compliance, despite Channel having no role in commissioning the programme. Therefore, any fines received are minimal as Channel's advertising income was by far the smallest of all the ITV companies.

In early 2008, Channel began broadcasting in 16:9 widescreen, approximately a decade after the rest of the network became widescreen capable with the launch of digital terrestrial television. The Channel Islands also completed the switchover from analogue to digital television signals in November 2010.

In 2011, Channel Television was bought from the Yattendon Group by ITV plc. The deal was announced on 18 October, subject to approval from the Jersey Competition Regulatory Authority, and was completed on 23 November. Although not announced, the deal was thought to have been worth at least £10 million. Following ITV's 2013 rebrand, Channel's presentation and the title of its news programme have been brought into line with the other ITV regions, although sporadic non-news programming remains.

== Studios ==
Channel Television operates two studios: the Jersey headquarters at Castle Quay on the St Helier waterfront and a Guernsey studio at Television House in Bulwer Avenue in St. Sampson, a building shared with BBC Radio Guernsey.

In Jersey, Channel's first headquarters were a purpose-built centre at the corner of Rouge Bouillon and Val Plaisant, housing one main 1,000 sq.ft. studio for all local productions and a continuity suite. As the company expanded, Channel moved into larger facilities in 1988 at La Pouquelaye, converted from the former offices of Rediffusion's Jersey operation. Initially, the La Pouquelaye centre housed two production studios (the smaller studio B was latterly converted into offices) and a continuity studio, later used exclusively for Puffin's Pla(i)ce. Channel moved to its current, smaller premises at Castle Quay in June 2015.

Channel's Guernsey operation was founded upon the station's launch in a hotel in Saint Peter Port, moving to Market Square in 1967, from where a microwave link with the Jersey headquarters was established in 1971, allowing live studio contributions from the island to be broadcast for the first time. In 1983, Channel in Guernsey moved again to larger facilities at St George's Esplanade, from where Channel Report was presented on a regular basis. The current Guernsey base in St. Sampson, including a small multi-camera studio, was opened in 1997.

Channel also previously had a London office, latterly based near to The London Studios, from where it ran its third-party compliance business.

== Identity ==
Channel Television's first on screen logo featured six hexagons, laid out five below linked together with one on top with a stylised cat's head inside it. The five hexagons below represent the five main channel islands: Jersey, Guernsey, Alderney, Sark and Herm. The ident was animated so that each hexagon appeared in turn accompanied by one note of the jingle along with the name. This ident lasted until colour came to the region in the mid-1970s with only one slight variation in the positioning of the channel name.

The first colour ident used by Channel involved a striped CTV, which would serve as the station logo until 1999. The first ident featured a static logo made of orange stripes on a white outline against a blue background with a soundtrack of a brass fanfare titled "Superstar Fanfare", composed by Keith Mansfield. This same fanfare was later used when Channel launched its next ident, featuring the lines of the CTV logo spinning into place, coloured gold against a black background. This was introduced around 1985 and was utilised for the station's 25th anniversary in 1987, when each line of the CTV logo was drawn out before spinning back to be joined by a striped 25.

In the early 1990s Channel aired its first computer generated ident, featuring the CTV logo, initially silver but turned gold by two sideways flashes, falling backwards onto the gradiented blue background. This logo was accompanied by a dramatic score which was later improved, along with the ident, in 1993. The improvements kept the theme and repositioned the logo, changed the background to a navy blue, made the logo itself bigger and gold throughout and, most noticeably, improved the music making it less dramatic and giving it a softer feel.

Both during this period and before, Channel used an on-air clock. The other ITV regions in the 1970s up to the very early 1990s, commonly used a clock as well, but it had been gradually been dropped. Channel kept the clock up to 2002, using it to introduce news and, more unusually, announce the local temperature and tide times prior to the following programme (something not seen elsewhere in the ITV network).

In 1998, Channel adopted a different style of presentation. The CTV logo remained, both on end captions and as the company logo, while on screen Channel utilised the device of the word 'Channel' written in a variety of fonts arranged in circles and moving, spinning and pulsating to a tune of a simple jingle. This look was not to last as the second ITV generic look occurred in 1999, which Channel adopted. This look, based on the theme of hearts, also provided Channel with a new logo, featuring a globe with the Channel Islands on it being orbited by two comets whose trails make a heart shape. Channel used the generic look, albeit with its own soundtrack, until 2002. The generic look was used for network programmes with regional ones using a large Channel logo over the spinning hearts background. When the celebrity idents came Channel used a variation, where the left side of the screen was taken up by its logo. A number of idents were used featuring different celebrities and some local ones made by Channel themselves were used; in 2002 a special ident to celebrate the station's 40th anniversary was introduced featuring former station logos.

On 1 November 2004, Channel used idents of scenes from around the Channel Islands, with the logo in a stripe down the left side of the screen. Some elements of the network branding were also used.

The logo for ITV1 Channel Television used between 2011 and 2013. A version of this logo with a flat yellow box and white ITV wordmark was in use between 2006 and 2011.

In 2006, Channel, whilst being fiercely independent and regional, adopted a variation of the national ITV1 network branding and shared continuity, due to it receiving a non-clean feed of networked programming from ITV Meridian. While the branding was very similar to regions owned by ITV plc Channel Television used an older ITV1 logo with white letters on its idents supplemented by the wording 'Channel Television' and pre-recorded local continuity announcements are used at key junctions - including prior to national and regional news and on the handover from ITV Breakfast at 9.25am. Typically this is "This is Channel Television, ITV in the Channel Islands", or at the handover from ITV Breakfast, "It's 9.25 and you're watching Channel Television, your local ITV station". These idents also use music from the original emotion idents rather than the updated jingle and music. It was the only ITV company to take the network branding without being a part of ITV plc.

Following the takeover in November 2011, Channel began using ITV1's 2010 logo and updated its idents.

On 14 January 2013, the station's on-air identity was changed to ITV, along with all other ITV plc-owned franchises. There are no specific idents stating Channel Television but the name is instead verbally referred to at the 6pm junctions before ITV News Channel TV and for a time it was used overnight.

== Programmes ==
=== Local shows ===
- ITV News Channel TV
- Puffin's Pla(i)ce
- Channel Islands Sports Awards

=== Contributions to network and multi-region series ===
Although Channel made little for the ITV network it did contribute to a number of roadshow and anthology series which were collaboratively produced in a number of the smaller TV regions, such as Highway.

=== Other programmes ===
- The Lonely Man (1963)
- The Bitter Years (1970; about the occupation of the Channel Islands during the Second World War)
- Jambo: The Gentle Giant (one-off documentary, 1986)
- Gallery (1986–92)
- The Dodo Club (1987–89)
- Cyril Fletcher's TV Garden (1990–92)
- Bertie the Bat (1990)
- Island (1996–97)
- The Story of the Battle of Flowers (two-part documentary, 2002)
- Simply the Best (2004)

== See also ==
- Media of Jersey
- Culture of Guernsey

ITV regional service
New service as Channel Television	Channel Islands; 1 September 1962 – present	Current provider as ITV Channel Television
