= Les Platons =

Highest point of Jersey and the Channel Islands

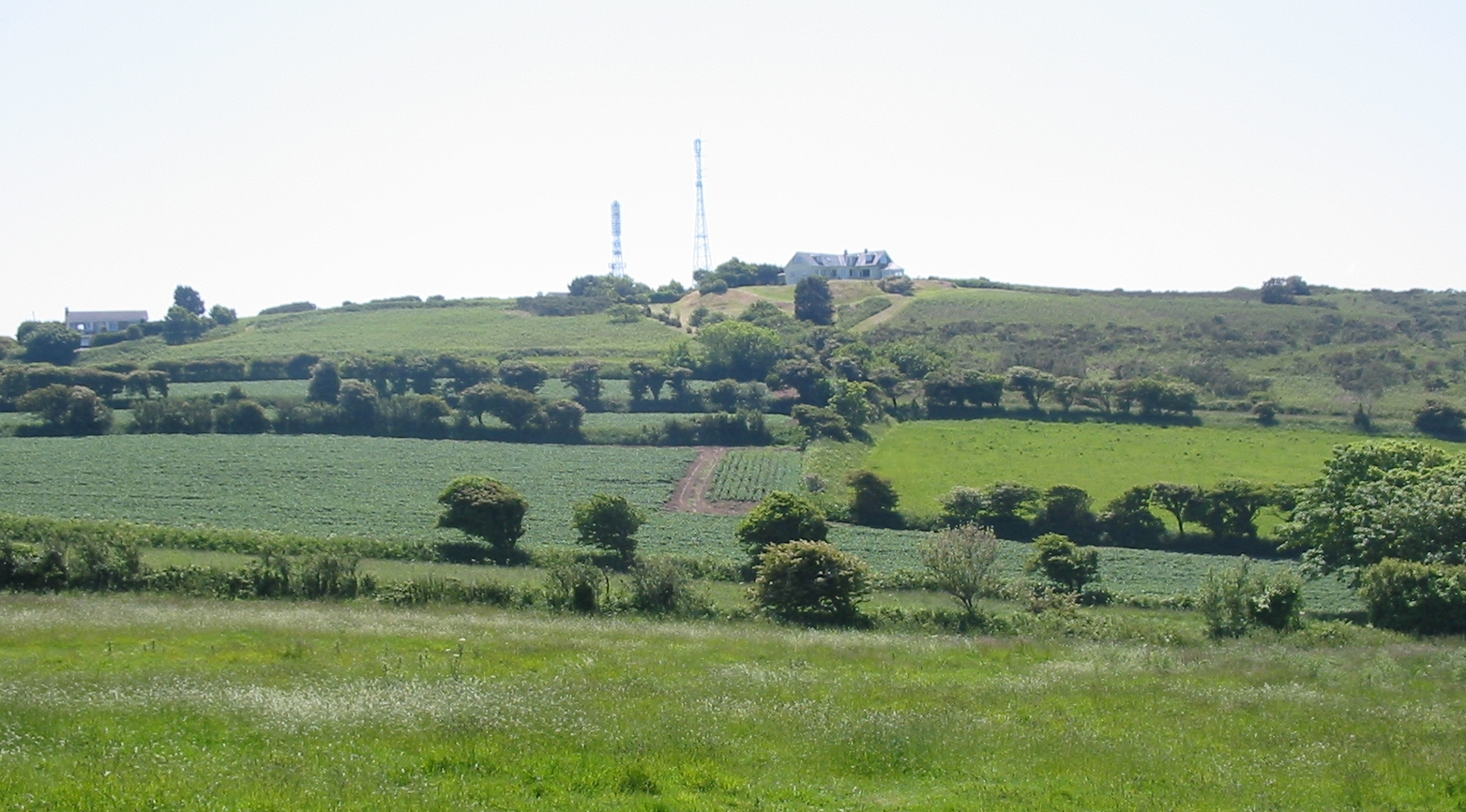

Highest point
- Elevation: 136 m (446 ft)
- Prominence: 136 m (446 ft)
- Listing: Hardy
- Coordinates: 49°14′52.05″N 2°06′17.43″W

Geography
- Location within Channel Islands
- Location: Jersey

Les Platons is the highest point of Jersey, a British Crown dependency, with an elevation of 136 metres (446 ft). It is located in the Vingtaine de la Ville-à-l'Évêque in the parish of Trinity.

There are radio transmitters, and a radar station located at Les Platons.

In October 1955, Les Platons was used as a site for a television transmitter to bring BBC Television (later renamed BBC One) transmissions to the Channel Islands. It transmitted BBC Television on the VHF 405 line service on channel 4 from Monday 3 October 1955. The site was also used to bring the BBC national radio stations to the Channel Islands. Before 1955 the Channel Islands had no transmitters, and received AM radio transmissions of the BBC national radio stations from mainland England.

The BBC started FM transmissions on 16 October 1961 from Les Platons, of the Home, Light and Third Programmes (had started in the UK in the mid-to-late 1950s). Later this became 91.1 as Radio 2 (with occasional Radio 1), 94.75 as Radio 3 (later rounded up to 94.8), and 97.1 as Radio 4. In March 1992, a new frequency on 89.6 was introduced for Radio 2; Radio 3 then moved to 91.1, and Radio 4 to 94.8, allowing Radio 1 to begin service on 97.1.

The Fremont Point transmitter about 1¼ miles (2 km) west of Les Platons would go on the air in September 1962 bringing Independent Television (ITV) to the Channel Islands for the first time in the form of the ITV franchise Channel Television. In due course Fremont Point became the main television transmitter site for the Channel Islands. It started broadcasting UHF 625 television in 1976 along with the introduction of BBC2 and colour television to the Channel Islands.

Les Platons television transmissions ceased in 1985 when the old VHF 405 line transmissions ceased in the UK. From 1985 onwards, Les Platons has been a radio transmitter site only.

== See also ==
- Arqiva
- Geography of Jersey
