= World of Music, Arts and Dance =

International arts festival

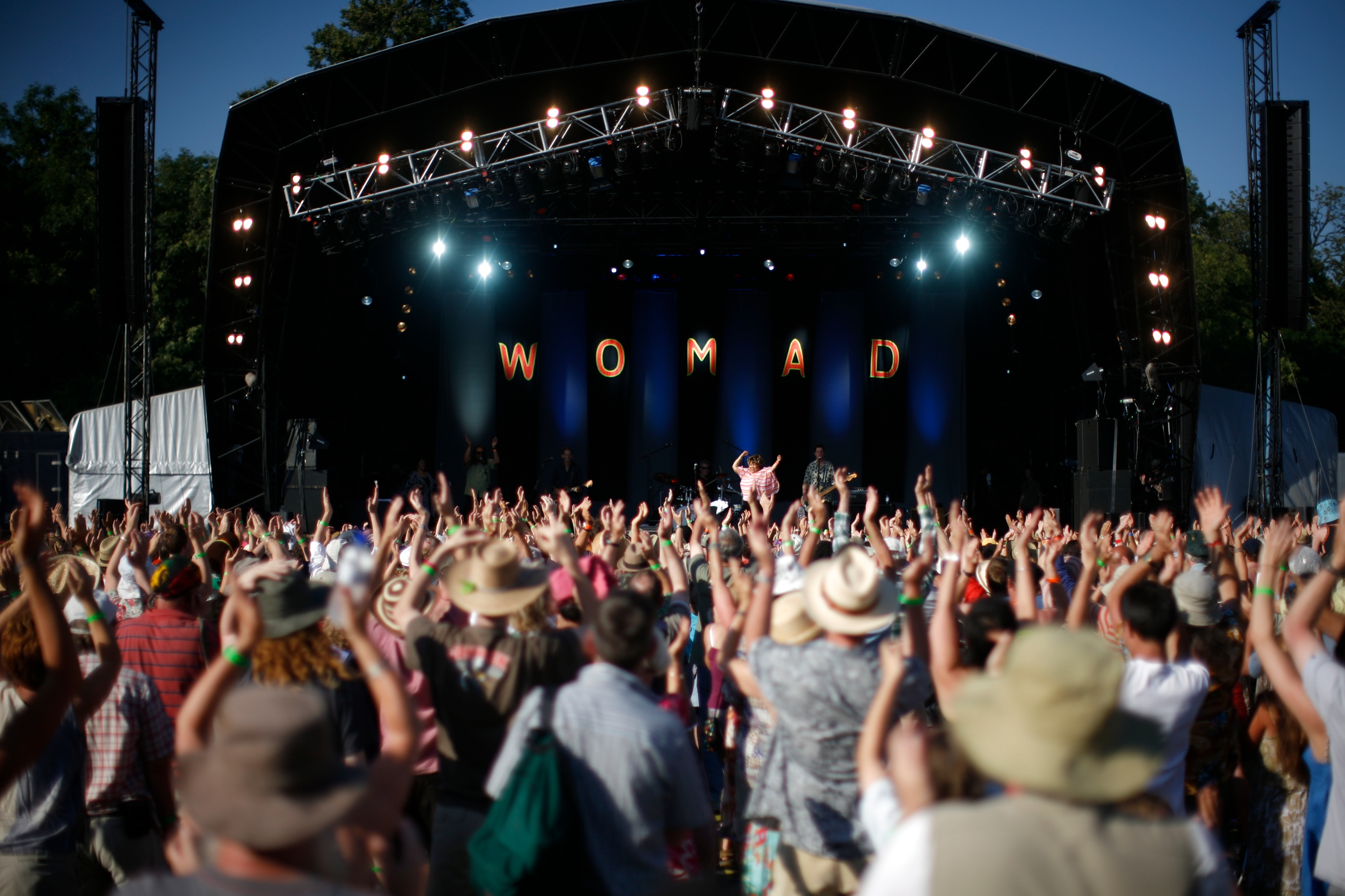
WOMAD, Charlton Park, 2008

The festival's logo, the WOMAD lion

WOMAD (/ˈwoʊˌmæd/ WOH-mad; World of Music, Arts and Dance) is both an international arts festival and an outreach foundation charity. The central aim of WOMAD is to celebrate the world's many forms of music, arts and dance.

== History ==
WOMAD was founded in 1980 by English rock musician Peter Gabriel, with Thomas Brooman, Bob Hooton, Mark Kidel, Stephen Pritchard, Martin Elbourne and Jonathan Arthur. Original designers were Steve Byrne and Valerie Hawthorn. The first WOMAD festival was in Shepton Mallet, Somerset in 1982. The audience saw Peter Gabriel, Don Cherry, The Beat, Drummers of Burundi, Echo & the Bunnymen, Imrat Khan, Prince Nico Mbarga, Peter Hammill, Simple Minds, Suns of Arqa, The Chieftains and Ekome National Dance Company, and others. Peter Gabriel's performance incorporated the Ekome National Dance Company, adding African drums to Gabriel's track "The Rhythm of the Heat".

Gabriel and his company, which had funded WOMAD, faced financial ruin from the high costs of the festival in its first year, worsened by the lack of suitable transport to the venue (Shepton Mallet Showground) and a lack of publicity. At the suggestion of Tony Smith, the manager of Gabriel and Genesis, he and the remaining members of Genesis agreed to play together for a single show under the name Six of the Best at Milton Keynes. The show rescued the company's finances and made it possible for further WOMAD events to take place.

In December 1992, six operating and support companies, including WOMAD U.K. and WOMAD Productions, were voluntarily liquidated due to the accumulation of $300,000 in debt. Dominic Pride wrote in Billboard that WOMAD and Gabriel's Real World company were discussing ways of saving the WOMAD festival. The festival promotion companies were subsequently saved by Real World Group after it purchased their name, trade, and assets.

Since 1982, WOMAD festivals have been held in 27 countries, entertaining over one million people. The main UK event settled at Rivermead in Reading, Berkshire, from 1990 until 2006, before moving to Charlton Park, Wiltshire from 2007.

In 2017, WOMAD UK marked its 35th anniversary. Headliners Emir Kusturica & The No Smoking Orchestra, Toots and the Maytals, Roy Ayers, Seun Kuti and Egypt 80, along with 30 other artists, performed for an audience of 40,000.

In 2022, after two forced cancellations due to the COVID-19 pandemic, the UK festival returned for its 40th anniversary. Peter Gabriel appeared on stage with Friday night headliner Angélique Kidjo, as well as introducing Osibisa on stage on the Saturday afternoon. Other headliners included The Flaming Lips, Fatoumata Diawara and Lianne La Havas. Other keys acts across the weekend on other stages included Kae Tempest, Kanda Bongo Man, Gilberto Gil, The Selecter, Fulu Miziki, and Les Amazones d'Afrique.

The UK festival took a year off in 2025 to look for a new home but the annual events in Adelaide, New Zealand, Caceres and Chile took place as usual. In late 2025 it was announced the UK festival would return to a new home in Neston Park, near Corsham in Wiltshire, in the final weekend of July 2026.

=== Festival recordings ===
A triple album was released in 2007 to mark the 25th anniversary of WOMAD featuring recordings from many of the festivals in the UK and other sites across the world. Various other Real World Records albums feature recordings from the 1982, 1988, 1996 and 2002 UK festivals.

Artists such as 23 Skidoo, Sons of Arqa, Echo & the Bunnymen and Tankus the Henge have released recordings from the UK festivals.

For the 40th anniversary of the first UK festival in 2022, Real World Records released the Live at WOMAD 1982 double album on CD, vinyl and download featuring mostly previously unreleased recordings from the first UK festival. The vinyl edition included a replica of the original poster.

Peter Gabriel's set from the 1982 festival was released under the title Live at WOMAD 1982 in August 2025, first as a digital-exclusive. A physical edition of the album was released the following year.

== Ethos ==
The festival's goals are stated to be all-inclusive in its ability to communicate through music and movement.

== Programming ==
WOMAD has always presented music that they felt to be of excellence, passion and individuality, regardless of musical genre or geographical origin. WOMAD encourages collaboration amongst the artists they invite to perform. The first WOMAD Festival in 1982 had Echo and the Bunnymen join forces with the Drummers of Burundi, and WOMAD Abu Dhabi 2010, saw a collaboration between Tinariwen, TV on the Radio members Kyp Malone and Tunde Adebimpe, Grammy-winning producer Ian Brennan (music producer, author), and the French Algerian Mehdi from Speed Caravan.

- Workshops. Adult workshops are taken by the musicians and will involve dance, musical instruments and discussions. Children's workshops involve painting, circus skills, graffiti, modelling, story telling and more.
- Taste The World. Musicians cook a choice of dish from their home country in front of an audience.
- Global Market. Sells international food and wares.

== UK location ==
Since 2026 the festival has been held at Neston Park, near Corsham in Wiltshire.

=== Previous and other UK locations ===
After the debut 1982 performance at the Bath & West Showground the festival took a sabbatical. There were some WOMAD events in 1983 at the ICA in London as part of a collaboration with Capital Radio Festival to see if there was still an audience for the brand and the Genesis 1982 one-off concert at Milton Keynes Bowl was billed as a WOMAD fundraiser (one of only two dates where Peter Gabriel performed again with the band since his departure in 1975, the previous was a warm-up date in London at the Hammersmith Odeon. 1984 was a one day event held at Ashton Court, Bristol, kindly shared with the Ashton Court Festival.

1985 saw the festival move to Mersea Island in Essex with New Order, The Fall, Toots & The Maytals, Nusrat Fateh Ali Khan, The Pogues, A Certain Ratio and Penguin Cafe Orchestra performing amongst others. (A section of Nusrat's performance was released on CD in 2019).

1986 the festival moved to Kenn Pier Farm, Clevedon, Somerset and saw performances from Gil Scott-Heron, Misty In Roots, Siouxsie & The Banshees, The Housemartins, Youssou N'Dour, The Bhundu Boys, Aswad, Hugh Masekela, 23 Skidoo and The Blue Aeroplanes amongst many others 19–20 July.

In 1987 WOMAD hosted the new world-music-focused third stage at Glastonbury Festival that went on to be called The Jazz World (and later, West Holts) stage. 1987 also saw the first of the WOMAD weekenders in Carlyon Bay, Cornwall (The Coliseum) that ran annually until 1993. (The Durutti Column released recordings from their performance here in the late 1980s). There was also an event at Earl's Court in London as well as a winter festival in Bristol.

From 1990 to 2006 The Rivermead Centre (and later Little John's Farm), Reading, Berkshire was the permanent WOMAD UK festival home before the festival moved to its next home in Wiltshire due to needing to expand. By the time the festival had expanded and needed to move there were three stages: The Open Air, Siam and Village. 1988 saw the Siam Tent introduced.

In 1991, musicians involved in WOMAD participated in the Real World Recording week at Real World Studios, which resulted in the release of several albums. A second recording week occurred the following year.

In 1992 there was an additional event in Derry, Northern Ireland as well as the Real World Recording Week in Box, Wiltshire (at Real World Studios). There was an additional World Festivals in The Park Gala event in Royal Victoria Park, Bath for the 10th anniversary of WOMAD; the same venue hosted another event the following year. Brighton Centre also hosted a Winter event.

In 2007 the festival moved from Reading to the grounds of Charlton Park, a stately home in Wiltshire, where it was held each July until 2024 (with 2020 and 2021 being cancelled due to the COVID-19 pandemic). The arena held at least five main stages, with another in the Arboretum. An old fashioned steam fair, global market, children's area, and a wellbeing section were also found on the site. In 2019 the capacity of the festival was 40,000.

WOMAD came to Bristol Zoo in 2011, with a subsequent event in 2012. A boycott of the 2012 event was called for by the Captive Animals Protection Society because of concerns that noise from the festival could affect the animals' welfare.

2022 saw a free WOMAD-commissioned event at the Southbank Centre, London featuring an hour-long performance by Yazz Ahmed.

2025 and 2026 saw a handful of events in Stroud, Gloucestershire.

=== Charlton Park highlights ===
==== 2007 ====
The first year on the new site saw rain and mud, with festival goers nicknaming the site "WOMUD".

==== 2008 ====
Due to the previous year's flooding and some inaccessibility, the site was rearranged and expanded. Stages included Open Air, Siam Tent, Big Red Tent, Little Sicily, Dance Tent, Drum Tent, BBC Radio 3 Stages and Taste The World Stage. Radio Womad was launched this year.

==== 2012 ====
Capacity is nearly doubled to 40,000.

==== 2013 ====
The headliners appearing on the Open Air and Siam Tent were Gilberto Gil, Rokia Traore, Seun Kuti and Lee "Scratch" Perry with Max Romeo.

Adjágas (Norway) Alice Russell (dropped out) Replaced by DJ Cheeba (UK) Amesmalua (Spain) Asif Ali Khan (Pakistan) Bwani Junction (UK) Canzoniere Grecanico Salentino (Italy) Carminho (Portugal) Christine Salem (Reunion) David Rodigan MBE (UK) David Wax Museum (USA) Debapriya & Samanwaya (India) Dizu Plaatjies and the Ibuyambo Ensemble (South Africa) Dub Inc (France) Emel Mathlouthi (Tunisia) Fanfare Ciocarlia (Romania) Fimber Bravo (Trinidad & Tobago) Flavia Coelho ( Brazil) Fredy Massamba (Congo) GOCOO (Japan) Hidden Orchestra (UK) Huun-Huur-Tu (Tuva/Russia) Iadoni (Georgia) Jagwa Music (Tanzania) Jesca Hoop (USA) Katy Carr & The Aviators (UK/Poland) Kissmet (India) La Chiva Gantiva (Colombia/Belgium/Vietnam/France) Le Vent Du Nord (Canada) Lévon Minassian (Armenia) Mala in Cuba (UK) Malawi Mouse Boys (Malawi) Malouma (Mauritania) Mohammad Reza Mortazavi (Iran) Mokoomba (Zimbabwe) Nano Stern (Chile) Ondatrópica (Colombia) Parov Stelar Band (Austria) Riot Jazz Brass Band (UK) Sam Lee and Friends (UK) Schlachthofbronx (Germany) Spoek Mathambo (South Africa) Steve Riley & the Mamou Playboys (USA) Syd Arthur (UK) Tamikrest (Mali) The Bombay Royale (India/Australia) The Heavy (UK) Urna & Kroke (Mongolia/Poland)

BBC Radio 3 Stage:

Mavrika (Greece) Barrule (Isle of Man) Family Atlantica (Ghana) Lucas Santtana (Brazil) Zykopops (Croatia) Roopa Panesar (United Kingdom) Imperial Tiger Orchestra (Switzerland) Reverend Peyton's Big Damn Band (United States) DJ Tudo e sua gente de todo lugar (Brazil) La Pegatina (Spain) Fidan Hajieva (Azerbaijan) Guy Schalom & The Baladi Blues (Egypt) DaWangGang (China) KonKoma (Ghana) Red Hot Chilli Pipers (Scotland)

==== 2014 ====
The 2014 headliners included Youssou N'Dour, Sinéad O'Connor, Manu Dibango and Les Ambassadeurs. Sinead O'Connor replaced Bobby Womack, who had died a handful of weeks before the festival; she dedicated her performance to him.

==== 2020 ====
WOMAD UK cancelled due to the COVID-19 pandemic. The festival, Radio Womad and BBC Radio 3 ran a free on-line only "WOMAD at Home" event the same weekend with exclusive and archive performances. Also, Will Lawton and the Alchemists gained permission to access the site and recorded a short two song set and are "The only band to play WOMAD 2020", with the video and images being released via their Facebook and Instagram accounts. "WOMAD at Home" T-shirts were sold to raise funds for the festival crews affected by the forced unemployment.

==== 2021 ====
WOMAD UK cancelled again. Radio WOMAD again broadcast exclusive live shows from the presenters' homes over the weekend.

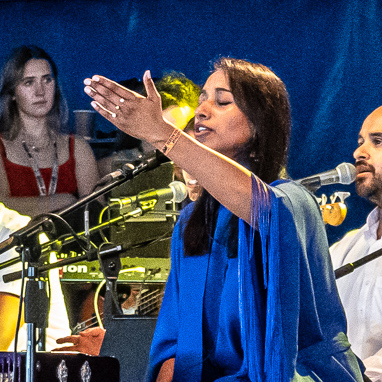
Orchestral Qawwali's Abi Sampa at WOMAD in 2023

== Worldwide locations ==
=== Australia ===
WOMADelaide, Adelaide, South Australia. Held bi-annually from 1992 to not interfere with the then bi-annual Adelaide festival. Then annually from 2004 due to its popularity and collaboration with the Adelaide Festival. No camping, capacity 30,000 daily, four days Fri-Mon mid March (originally three days until 2010).

The 2021 event was one of the first of its kind due to Australia's unique lockdown rules and a smaller event of 6000 capacity was held in its place.

=== Spain ===
- WOMAD Cáceres, Extremadura, Spain (a free event held in a medieval town square over four days, in May, held since 1992). The 2020 and 2021 events were cancelled due to the pandemic.
- WOMAD Las Palmas de Gran Canaria, Canary Islands, Spain (a free three day event that began in 1993, held in the modern part of the capital city's main parks held across two stages and a third indoor stage plus activities for children, culminating in a parade on the final day, held in November). The 2020 and 2021 events were cancelled due to the pandemic. 2024 event was also cancelled.

=== New Zealand ===
WOMAD New Zealand, New Plymouth, Taranaki, New Zealand. Originally in Auckland as part of the WOMAD express called "WOMAD Pacific" in 1997, also a sibling event to WOMADelaide. Moved to New Plymouth and held bi-annually from 2003 and then annually from 2013, day and weekend tickets offered plus camping allowed, 23,000 capacity, Fri-Sat, late March).

WOMAD New Zealand 2021 was cancelled in late 2020 due to COVID-19 pandemic complications; because of New Zealand's social distancing regulations during the emergence of COVID, its local organizing committee argued that the financial risk was too high if restrictions were to potentially be reinstated in close proximity to the event. The event did also not go ahead in 2022 for the same reasons, but did recommence in 2023.

=== Chile ===
WOMAD Chile, Santiago, Chile. Three day annual event held end of March or start of April, since 2015.

=== South Africa ===
WOMAD South Africa (a multiple location event, billed as a safari, [initially delayed because of the pandemic when it was due to launch in 2020] was started in 2022 and held in October over a series of days at small boutique events in Cape Town, Johannesburg, Soweto and Hermanus with hopes for bigger events in 2023 and beyond).

== Previous locations (years included where known) ==
- WOMAD Denmark (Rostilde) 1988
- WOMAD Canada (Toronto) 1988 – 1992
- WOMAD France (Nantes – 1989, Le Havre – 1992; two separate events in summer and winter, 1998 – Fontainebleau)
- WOMAD Finland (Helnsinki – 1989, 1992, 1995, Seinajoka – 1990 -1992)
- WOMAD Spain (Barcelona – 1989 – 1992 [two separate events in 1991], Badalona – 1990, Granada – 1995)
- WOMAD Germany (Hamburg – 1989 – 1991, Mainz – 1990, Hannover Expo – 2000)
- WOMAD Italy (Catania, Sicily – 1989, Palermo, Sicily −1998-2002, Taormina, Sicily – 2003–2012, Florence – 1990, Olbia, Sardinia – 1995, 1996, Rome (a three-day event in 2023 at the beginning of June))
- WOMAD Sweden (Falun – 1990 – 1991)
- WOMADrid (Madrid, Spain) 1992 – 1993
- WOMAD Japan (Yokahama – 1991 – 1995)
- WOMAD USA (recordings from this event were released on CD). 1993 – 2001 (2000 was announced but later cancelled). (Some earlier events were incorporated at the Woodstock Festival 1994).
- WOMAD Turkey (Cesme – 1993)
- WOMAD at the Venice Carnival 1996 (recordings from this event were released on CD)
- WOMAD Singapore 1997 – 2007 (recordings from these events were released on CD as well as compilation CDs promoting the festivals held there)
- WOMAD Prague, 2000
- WOMAD Athens 2002
- WOMAD South Korea – 2005 & 2006
- WOMAD Sri Lanka 2005
- WOMAD Abu Dhabi, 2010 Abu Dhabi, UAE
- WOMAD Russia 2013
- WOMAD Gran Tarajal, Fuerteventura (Spain) 2014 & 2015
- WOMAD Portugal
- WOMAD Austria
- WOMAD South Africa (Previous events include 1999, 2000 and 2023)
- WOMAD Mexico was planned and stalled due to the pandemic in 2020

== Radio WOMAD ==
Previously based on Charlton Park every year since the second year (2008) the UK festival was held there, the official festival radio station is broadcast on a temporary FM licence (usually on 87.7FM) just prior to the festival opening its gates to the public and broadcasts 24 hours a day every day until late Monday after the public gates have closed. Each year the station hosts several exclusive live sessions and interviews from artists playing at the festival across the weekend. The FM signal reaches about ten miles away from the festival site, and broadcasts can be heard online via Mixcloud. In 2026 the station also began to broadcast to the local area via DAB.

During the forced cancellations of the festival in 2020 and 2021, the radio station was set up to broadcast remotely from several of the presenter's homes across the UK and was broadcast live via Mixcloud where listeners could interact with other listeners and the presenters for the "WOMAD at home" events. The shows showcased several highlights of previous live sessions from their archives. There was also a special live Christmas show in 2021 and two special live announcement shows in early 2022, to tie in with the line-up announcement from the festival, broadcast from station manager Steve Satan's kitchen.

== See also ==
- Real World Records
