= Simon Hall (writer) =

British writer

Simon Hall (born 3 February 1969 in Bedford) is a course leader in Compelling Communication Skills at the University of Cambridge. He's also an author, with eight novels, and a series of books and audio learning talks on business skills and communication published (https://bookboon.com/en/author/d83eb8f2-8c4d-4b1a-9f6b-f8d108718cb0).

Hall runs Creative Warehouse (https://www.creative-warehouse.com/), a Cambridge-based business communication consultancy, and teaches communication skills at the University of Cambridge, as well as for companies and organisations. He's a Senior Research Associate at Jesus College, Cambridge, in the Intellectual Forum.

Previously, he was a BBC News Correspondent for 20 years, specialising in home affairs, business and economics, and the environment.

Hall worked for BBC South West Television's regional news programme, Spotlight, and also broadcast on BBC Radio Devon and BBC Radio Cornwall.

Hall has covered many high-profile stories, including the attempt to detonate a bomb in the Giraffe restaurant in Exeter, the grounding of the container ship MSC Napoli in east Devon, and the flooding of the Cornish village of Boscastle.

== Biography ==
Hall was born in the village of Oakley, in Bedfordshire. (His parents later moved to Lincoln, and then Littlehampton in West Sussex.)

He went to Littlehampton Community School and then the University of Kent at Canterbury, where he joined the college radio station, UKC Radio. Hall later did a diploma in broadcast journalism at University College, Cardiff.

Hall joined the BBC as a trainee. He later worked for ITV. He worked around England before settling in the South West.

== Writing career ==
Hall has written several novels about a Plymouth-based television crime reporter, Dan Groves, nicknamed "The TV Detective", who often helps police to solve cases that he is reporting on. The books are all set in Devon.

The first novel, A Popular Murder, was published by a print-on-demand company in 2006.

A mainstream publisher, Accent Press, published Hall's next book, The Death Pictures, in February 2008. The plot concerns the murder of a dying artist. It was published in the United States in October 2008.

Evil Valley came out in September 2008. The story is about preventing a psychopath from committing a crime. Much of the action is set on Dartmoor.

The Judgement Book was published in September 2009. The story is about blackmail.

The TV Detective was published in February 2010. It tells how Groves and Adam Breen, the chief inspector in the series first met and is partly based on A Popular Murder.

The Balance of Guilt was published in September 2010. The story surrounds a terrorist atrocity in a sacred building in Exeter.

The Judgment Book is a story of the dangers of seeking revenge.

Hall has been longlisted for the Crime Writers' Association Dagger in the Library award, for writers most popular with library users.

A play, based on the TV Detective books, has been written by Hall. Called An Unnecessary Murder, it ran at the Barnfield Theatre in Exeter. It is a charitable production, in aid of Hospiscare, a Devon-based organisation that Hall has undertaken many events to support. He cites "very personal" reasons as his motivation.

Hall's latest novel, The Editor, was published in September 2019, by Bloodhound Books. It focuses on four people who have lost hope in life, and set about trying to find it again.

The book is set in Cambridge, the first of Hall's works to be based in the city. He wrote it after moving there in 2017.
