= Steve Satan =

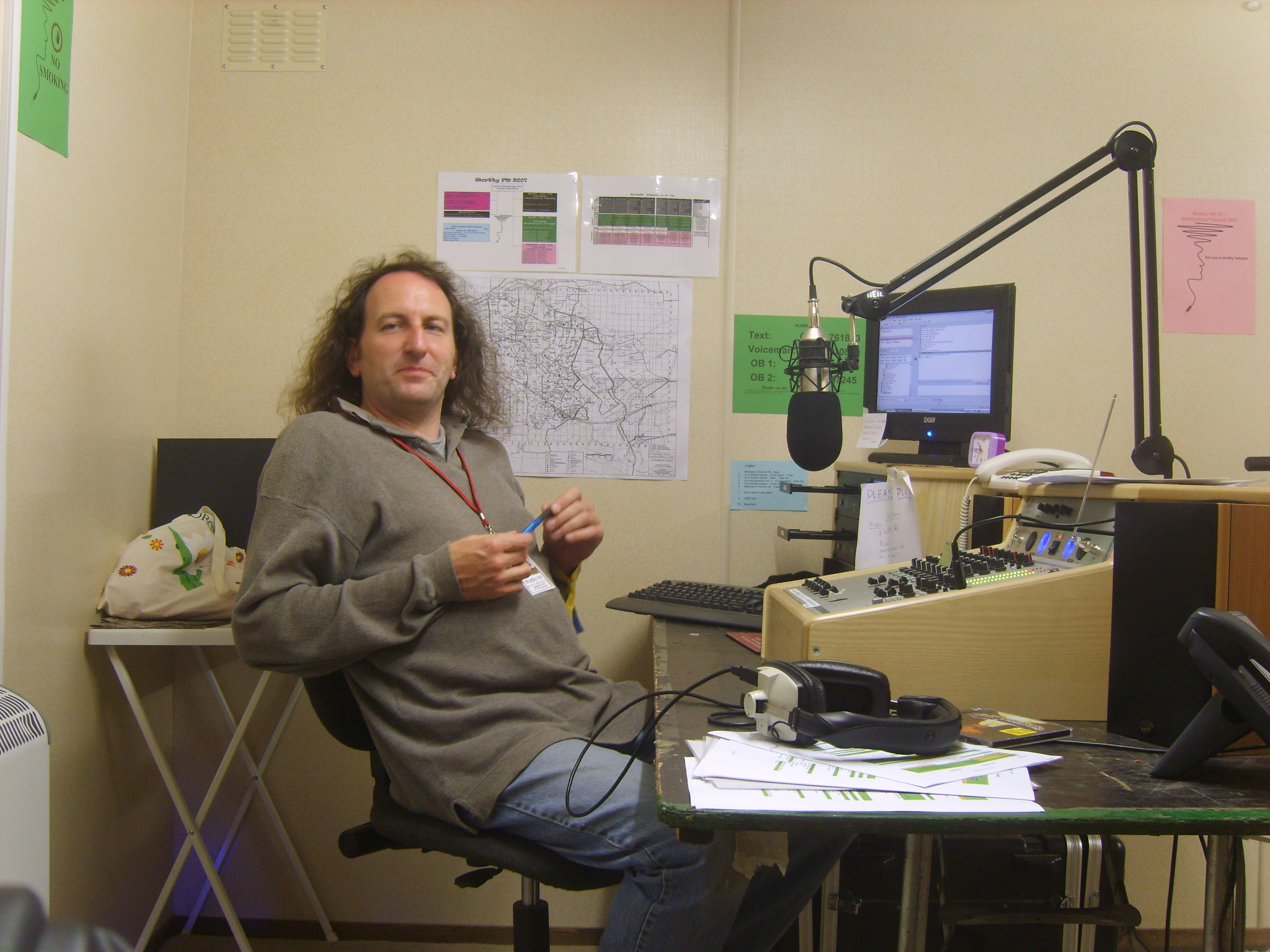
Steve Satan at Worthy FM, 2007

Steve Satan started his career as head of rock on the pirate radio station Radio Caroline, using the pseudonyms Andy Bradgate and Colin Mueslibar. He went on to work for Contact 94 in France, Sunshine Radio in Luxemburg and Merlin Network One. He is currently head of Radio WOMAD. Satan also provides technical support for Worthy FM, which provides onsite coverage of the Glastonbury Festival. He also hosts a drivetime show on Bristol community radio station BCFM.

== See also ==
- World of Music, Arts and Dance
