= Supergold =

Oldies radio sustaining service

Supergold (Europe) was an oldies radio sustaining service originally operated by the Telstar Satellite Music Network (TSMN) and later by Chiltern Radio Network in the United Kingdom. Originally devised by entrepreneur and DJ Graham Kentsley, it was one of Europe's first satellite delivered radio stations, receiving a Satellite Television Technology International (STTI) award for satellite communication innovation.

== History ==
The Supergold oldies radio format was originally a creation of Mike Harvey the US Disk Jockey in the mid 80's. Mike could to be heard on weekday mornings on WEBG-FM 100.3 and on Saturday nights coast to coast in the US as the host of "SuperGold". In 2017 Harvey still has two syndicated programs broadcast in the US.The nightly Mike Harvey Show and SuperGold Weekend. The format was acquired from Transtar Radio by the "Satellite Music Network" of Dallas, Texas USA - Supergold became one of SMN's many radio formats.

In 1987, Graham Kentsley a young entertainment music and media entrepreneur and satellite communication expert from St Albans UK. Decided that with the launch of several new European satellites there was now a need for a Pan European satellite sustaining radio service and set about with his brother Steven Kentsley in launching the Telstar Satellite Music Network (a division of Kentsley's own Telstar Satellite TV company). Kentsley being a music and radio enthusiast had previously installed the first Satellite TV/Radio system in any licensed premises (The Adelaide Wine House in St Albans UK). In 1987 Kentsley visited the studios of the Satellite Music Network in Dallas, Texas and reached an agreement with Satellite Music Network to take the "Supergold" format to Europe on a trial basis.

Supergold was launched in the UK in November 1988 from the EAP studios in Frinton Essex UK and broadcast on the Intelsat Satellite 27.5 (on a mono audio subcarrier) initially heard between the hours of 11 pm and 6 am UK time (a high quality ISDN line took the signal from Frinton in Essex to the British Telecom Docklands uplink facility via the British Telecom Tower in central London). "Supergold" was put off the air for a whole night on one occasion when a cow chewed the ISDN line somewhere outside Clacton in Rural Essex UK.

TSMN offered the remaining daytime broadcast time for Satellite audio distribution (commercials and news distribution) and a private radio user group (shop chains) a European first. TSMN was planning a second radio format "Country" Gold - This was also a European first. On the first night on air, Supergold was opened by CEO Graham Kentsley, followed by the first show presented by Tony Gillham the programme director. (Gillham later went on to work for Chiltern Radio, who later acquired the European Supergold format.) Telstar by the Tornados was the stations signature tune (played at the top of every hour during the station optout). Supergold used an innovative sub-audio tone switching system to allow local stations on the network to opp in and out of the program's the system was developed by Graham Kentsley and his brother technical director Steven Kentsley - to the listener it sounded as if they were listening to their own local radio station during this overnight period allowing affiliates to substantially cut their operating costs.

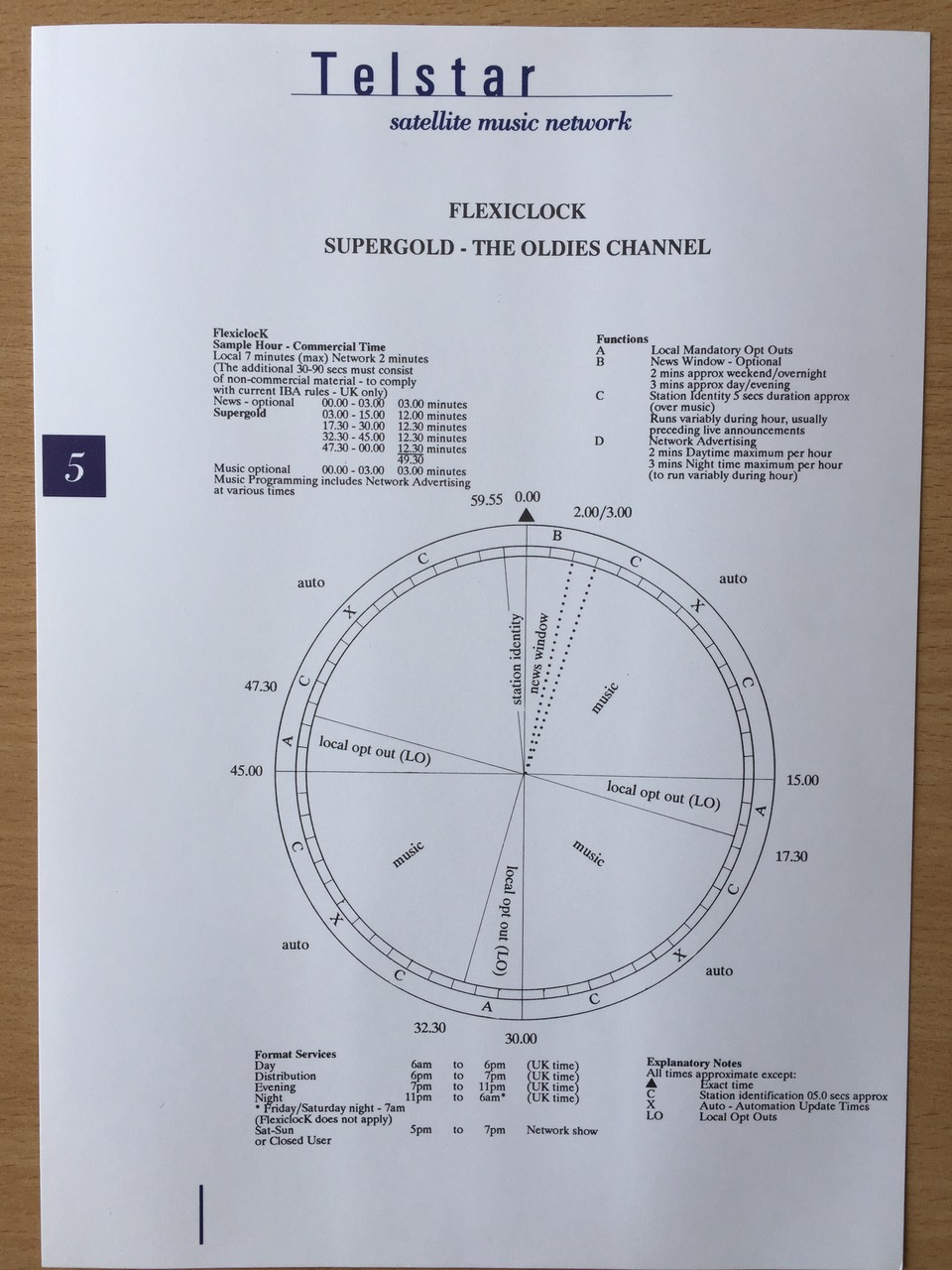
TSMN Flexiclock Supergold

Supergold broadcast its experimental service successfully for approx 6 months signing up several European affiliates including stations in Spain, the Channel Islands (UK)/France Contact 94 - Gibraltar (GBC) and Vienna in Austria (Blue Danube Radio). However it became clear to Kentsley and to the TSMN management that they would not be able to reach the critical mass of radio affiliates required to make the station commercially viable after this initial trial period. Kentsley discussed the position with another St Albans UK resident Peter Burton then Chairman of the local radio group Chiltern Radio and the SuperGold format moved homes from the TSMN to the [Chiltern Radio group. Tony Gilliam went on to work for the Chiltern Radio Group and the New Supergold format. Kentsley later tendered without success for the St Albans Local radio franchise (StAR FM = St Albans Radio) along with Verulam radio and Chiltern Radio.Tony Gillham was again the proposed programme director for StAR FM. Tony Gillham is now with the radio stations Black Cat Radio and 45 Radio. The St Albans radio franchise was finally awarded by the Radio Authority to the largest commercial radio operator in the area Chiltern Radio.

The Chiltern Radio Supergold service was launched at 10 am on Sunday 24 June 1990, following requests from the Radio Authority for radio stations to split frequencies into separate AM and FM services or lose them. The first presenters heard were Tony Lloyd and Colin Wilsher.

It was broadcast from Studio 1 at the Studio HQ in Dunstable, Bedfordshire and was first heard on Chiltern Radio's 792 kHz AM, 828 kHz AM transmitters and Northants Radio's 1557 kHz AM transmitter.

Later, Chiltern acquired Gloucestershire's Severn Sound in 1989 and this led to the rebranding of their 774 kHz AM service as Severn Sound Supergold in 1992.

Elsewhere, Coast AM, Invicta FM's medium wave AOR/soft rock station, was renamed Coast Classics and began playing more 'oldies'. By 1990 it became a fully fledged 'Golden Oldies' station and in 1991 it started taking the SuperGold service on its 1242 kHz and 603 kHz AM frequencies. As a result, the station was renamed Invicta Supergold. However, just before this change took place, and for most of Summer 1991, presenters referred to the station Coast Classics Invicta Supergold on air, to allow listeners to get used to the change. It achieved a 17% reach in a JICRAR survey; some say much to the disgust of its Southern Radio Group bosses who, it has been said, preferred their AM stations to hover around the 9% mark.

Radio Maldwyn in Mid Wales, western Shropshire, north western Herefordshire also took Supergold as a sustaining service overnight. Q96, the Renfrewshire station serving parts of Greater Glasgow also used Supergold in the early 1990s.

== Programmes ==
The original weekday presenters included Colin Wilsher for breakfast, Bill Overton with an hour's phone-in at 10.00am, Dave Foster till 3.00 p.m., and Tony Lloyd at Drive, until 7.00 p.m. Sunday programming included Paul Burrell and the Elvis Hour with Willie Morgan who later went on to host 'Sunday Will Never Be The Same' in early 1991. Burrell later went on to become the Breakfast Show presenter, and Morgan became the Head of Music for the SuperGold network, and latterly the Programme Controller of SuperGold, as well as presenting most of the station's 'specialist programmes inc. Beatles Hour, Classic Soul Hour, Rock & Roll - The Real Thing (co-hosted with Burrell), Get on The Right Track (a classic Album Track show). He also produced & presented the 40 min slot "Down In The Vaults", which was the junction between the Breakfast show and the more lifestlyle-orientated mid morning sequence.'

== Closure ==
The Supergold network closed on Sunday 1 September 1996 following the takeover of Chiltern Radio in 1995 by the GWR group. In place of Supergold, listeners would now receive Classic Gold. The takeover also enabled GWR to base Classic Gold at Chiltern's HQ in Dunstable, where Chiltern's own Supergold service had previously been based.

== See also ==
- The Superstation
