= Geography of Jersey =

Jersey
Native name: Jèrri
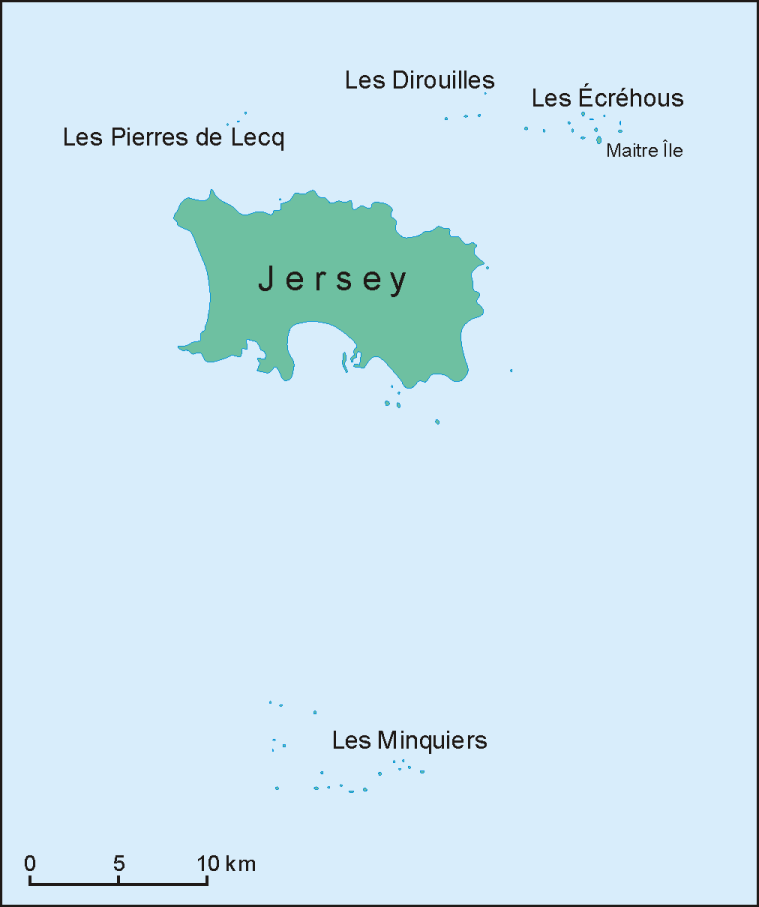
- Map of islands of Bailiwick of Jersey

- Location within France

Geography
- Location: English Channel
- Coordinates: 49°11′24.06″N 2°6′36″W
- Archipelago: Channel Islands
- Area: 119.49 km^{2} (46.14 sq mi)
- Length: 14 km (8.7 mi)
- Width: 8 km (5 mi)
- Coastline: 70 km (43 mi)
- Highest elevation: 143 m (469 ft)
- Highest point: Les Platons

Administration
- United Kingdom
- Crown dependency: Jersey
- Capital city: Saint Helier
- Largest settlement: Saint Helier

Demographics
- Population: 99,500 (2013)
- Pop. density: 819/km^{2} (2121/sq mi)
- Ethnic groups: English and Norman-French descent. Portuguese and Polish minorities

Jersey (Jèrriais: Jèrri) is the largest of the Channel Islands, an island archipelago in the St. Malo bight in the western English Channel. It has a total area of 120 square kilometres (46 mi^{2}) and is part of the British Isles archipelago. It lies 22 kilometres (12 nmi; 14 mi) from the Cotentin Peninsula in Normandy, France and about 161 kilometres (87 nmi; 100 mi) from the south coast of Great Britain. Jersey lies within longitude -2° W and latitude 49° N.

It has a coastline of 70 kilometres and no land connections to any other territories. Jersey claims a territorial sea of 3 nmi (5.6 km; 3.5 mi) and an exclusive fishing zone of 12 nmi (22.2 km; 13.8 mi) and shares maritime borders with the Bailiwick of Guernsey to the north and France to the south and east.

Jersey is the main island of the Bailiwick of Jersey, which also consists of islet groups known as Les Écréhous, Les Minquiers, Les Dirouilles and Les Pierres de Lecq.

It is a highly densely populated territory, being the 13th most densely populated country or territory. About 30% of the population of the island is concentrated in the parish of Saint Helier, which contains the main town of the island.

== Climate ==
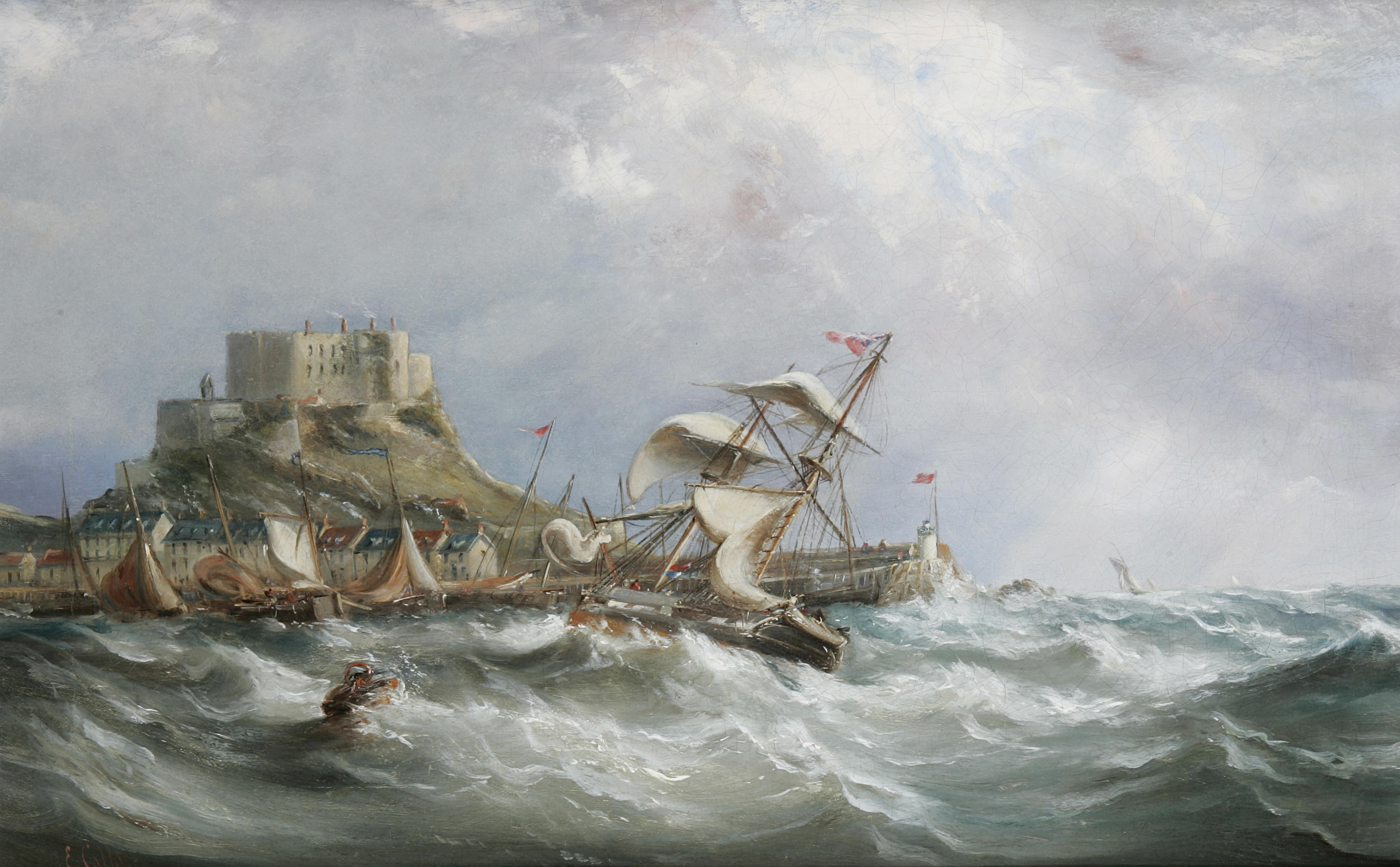
A painting of a storm at Gorey Harbour

The island has an oceanic climate, with cool to mild winters and lukewarm to warm summers. The highest temperature recorded was 37.9 °C (100.2 °F), on 18 July 2022, and the lowest temperature recorded was −10.3 °C or 13.5 °F, on 5 January 1894. 2022 was the warmest (and sunniest) year on record; the mean daily air temperature was 13.56 °C or 56.41 °F. For tourism advertising, Jersey often claims to be "the sunniest place in the British Isles", as Jersey has over 1,900 hours of sunlight. Jersey is indeed one of the sunniest places in the British Isles, especially during the warmer months, as it is subject to more influence from the Azores High, which acts as a blocking mechanism for depressions that originate in the North Atlantic and that produce stratiform clouds and rain; these are deflected northwards towards the UK mainland. The Azores High further reduces the type of convective cloud formations (particularly Cumulus and Stratocumulus) that are common over more northern and inland areas of the UK during summer through subsidence.

In 2011, Jersey generated controversy for calling itself "the warmest place in the British Isles" during an advertising campaign, as Jersey is neither the place with the highest maximum temperature in the British Isles (40.3 °C or 104.5 °F was recorded in Coningsby, Lincolnshire in July 2022) or the highest winter temperatures in the British Isles (which would be the Isles of Scilly).

Typical wind speeds vary between 20 kilometres per hour (12 mph) and 40 kilometres per hour (25 mph). During the cooler months, extratropical cyclones can produce gales somewhat regularly.

Snow is very rare in Jersey. The last significant snowfall event occurred in March 2013, when 14 centimetres (5.5 in) fell. The most recent measurable snowfall occurred on 8–9 January 2024, when 3 to 5 centimetres (1.2 to 2.0 in) fell. Initially, a fall of only 0.5 cm (0.20 in) had been forecast, so the event was more significant than expected.

Extreme weather is rare due to the island's mild climate. Spring and summer thunderstorms originating from the European mainland occasionally occur, but are usually not severe. Thunderstorms advecting north from the Bay of Biscay tend to occur during the summer if the influence of the Azores High temporarily weakens and a cut-off low develops in the region. Cool season thunderstorms are more common compared with other parts of Europe, as the relatively warm sea-surface temperatures drive moderate surface-based convection into the cold, dry air aloft. This tends to result in small hail and weak waterspouts driven by convection and frequent shear brought on by cold fronts.

In November 2023, Jersey was hit by extratropical Storm Ciarán, causing heavy rainfall, extremely high winds with gusts of up to 104 miles per hour (167 km/h). A supercell thunderstorm associated with the cold front of this system hit Jersey at around midnight on 2 November 2023. With severe wind shear and a significant temperature contrast of the upper atmosphere and sea surface, the storm produced extremely large hail and a tornado, which devastated the eastern half of the Island and was subsequently rated T6/EF3 by TORRO, making it one of the most severe tornadoes ever recorded in the British Isles.

The Government of Jersey's official meteorological department provides a five-day forecast for Jersey and Guernsey, including detailed shipping forecasts and aviation forecasts.

Jersey has a generally mild, temperature and oceanic climate. The mean daily air temperature for 2019 was 12.79 °C - the eighth warmest year since 1894. The record warmest year was 2014, with a mean daily air temperature of 13.34 °C.

There are very few extreme weather events in Jersey, however there are regular heatwaves and storm periods. This can lead to disruption across the island. For example, in February 2020, Storm Ciara led to the closure of a number of roads (especially Victoria Avenue).

Climate data for Jersey Airport, elevation 84m, 1981–2010
Month	Jan	Feb	Mar	Apr	May	Jun	Jul	Aug	Sep	Oct	Nov	Dec	Year
Record high °C (°F)	14.0 (57.2)	18.0 (64.4)	20.3 (68.5)	25.0 (77.0)	34.2 (93.6)	33.0 (91.4)	36.0 (96.8)	36.0 (96.8)	30.2 (86.4)	26.0 (78.8)	21.0 (69.8)	16.0 (60.8)	36.0 (96.8)
Mean daily maximum °C (°F)	8.3 (46.9)	8.4 (47.1)	10.4 (50.7)	12.5 (54.5)	15.8 (60.4)	18.4 (65.1)	20.4 (68.7)	20.6 (69.1)	18.7 (65.7)	15.4 (59.7)	11.7 (53.1)	9.2 (48.6)	14.2 (57.6)
Daily mean °C (°F)	6.3 (43.3)	6.1 (43.0)	7.9 (46.2)	9.5 (49.1)	12.6 (54.7)	15.1 (59.2)	17.2 (63.0)	17.5 (63.5)	15.8 (60.4)	13.0 (55.4)	9.6 (49.3)	7.1 (44.8)	11.5 (52.7)
Mean daily minimum °C (°F)	4.3 (39.7)	3.8 (38.8)	5.3 (41.5)	6.5 (43.7)	9.3 (48.7)	11.8 (53.2)	13.9 (57.0)	14.3 (57.7)	12.9 (55.2)	10.6 (51.1)	7.5 (45.5)	5.0 (41.0)	8.8 (47.8)
Record low °C (°F)	−10.3 (13.5)	−9.0 (15.8)	−3.3 (26.1)	−1.6 (29.1)	0.0 (32.0)	5.9 (42.6)	9.0 (48.2)	7.7 (45.9)	6.0 (42.8)	−2.6 (27.3)	−3.0 (26.6)	−4.0 (24.8)	−10.3 (13.5)
Average precipitation mm (inches)	93.1 (3.67)	68.9 (2.71)	66.1 (2.60)	56.4 (2.22)	55.6 (2.19)	47.5 (1.87)	44.6 (1.76)	49.5 (1.95)	63.9 (2.52)	103.4 (4.07)	105.4 (4.15)	111.3 (4.38)	865.8 (34.09)
Mean monthly sunshine hours	66.1	91.6	134.0	196.5	236.7	245.4	252.7	235.3	184.6	118.8	79.9	63.2	1,904.8
Source: Met Office and Voodoo Skies

== Physical geography ==
GIF showing the evolution of the Cotentin Peninsula and the separation of Jersey from the remainder of the European continent.

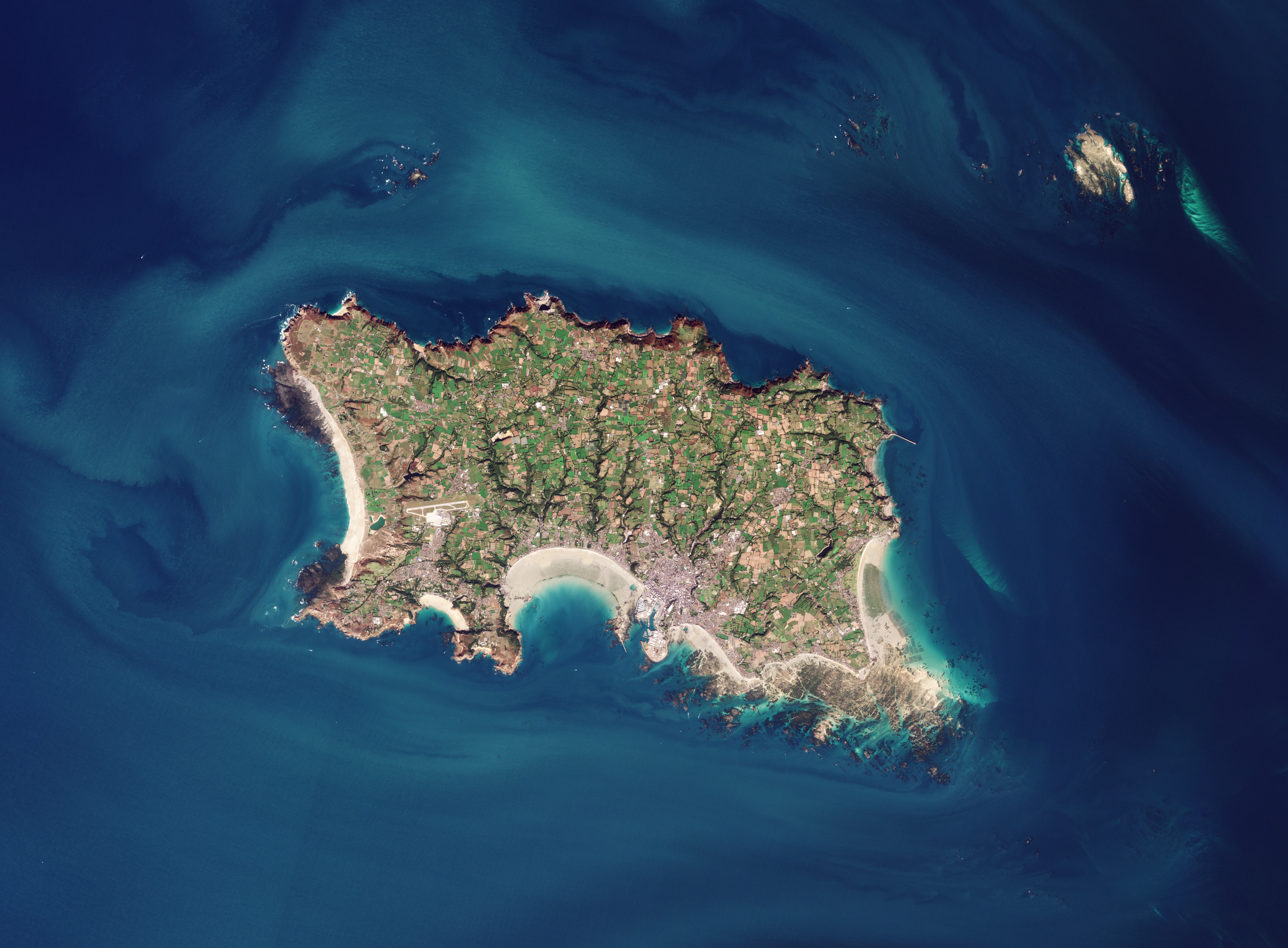
This true colour image of Jersey was taken on 30 June 2018, by ESA's Sentinel-2 satellite.

Besides the main island, the bailiwick includes other islets and reefs with no permanent population: Les Écréhous, Les Minquiers, Les Pierres de Lecq, Les Dirouilles.

The highest point in the island is Les Platons on the north coast, at 136 metres (446 ft). Parts of the parish of St Clement in the south were previously below sea-level but the construction of a seawall and infilling of low land has probably left only a few pockets of land below mean sea level. The terrain is generally low-lying on the south coast, with some rocky headlands, rising gradually to rugged cliffs along the north coast. On the west coast there are sand dunes. Small valleys run north to south across the island. Very large tidal variation exposes large expanses of sand and rock to the southeast at low tide.

Snow falls rarely in Jersey; some years will pass with no snow fall at all.

=== Natural resources ===
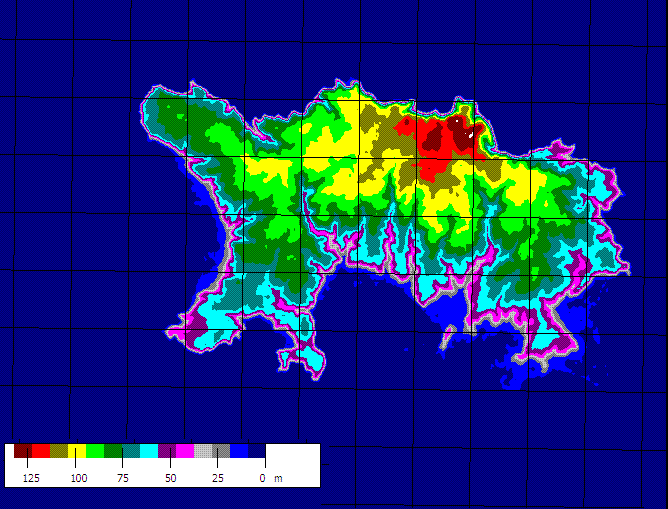
topographic relief image

The main natural resource on this island is arable land. 66% of the island's land is used as such, and the remaining 34% is used for other purposes.

There are two laws that govern agricultural land in Jersey: Agricultural Land (Control of Sales and Leases) (Jersey) Law 1947 and Protection of Agricultural Land (Jersey) Law 1964. Temporary changes of land use can be granted by the Land Controls scheme, which means land over 2 vergées (0.36 ha) can be used for an alternative purpose, however permanent changes require planning permission.

The Channel Islands are located in an area with a large tidal range. The development of tidal energy in the archipelago has long been suggested. Studies suggest the primary sites for tidal energy development would be located in the Bailiwick of Guernsey, especially in the Alderney Race, which could potentially produce up to 5.10 GW of power.

=== Environment ===
Jersey is facing localised impacts due to anthropogenic climate change. The island is party to the Kyoto Protocol but does not have an emissions cap. In 2017, Jersey has emissions of around 400 ktCO2 eq., a decrease of around 350 ktCO2 eq since the peak in 1998. Under a 3 °C rise in temperature, Jersey may have four to five times the number of hot days in summer and a 45% decrease in summer rainfall.

Jersey Greenhouse Gas Emissions (2017)
	Emissions (kt CO_{2}eq)	%
Agriculture	14.8	4
Business	80.3	22
Energy Supply	22.7	6
Land use change	-6.5	-2
Residential	56.0	15
Transport	186.9	51
Waste Management	11.4	3
Imported Electricity	3	0.8
Total	368.5	

Climate change could have impacts on Jersey's economy. Climate change will increase soil temperatures, shifting growing seasons more to winter seasons, impacting the current husbandry practices. Being at the boundary of two marine regions, Jersey's waters could see a change in fish species. A rise in temperature could be beneficial to the island's tourist industry, with more annual warm days and less rainfall in the summer attracting longer and more frequent stays from travellers.

In May 2019, the States Assembly declared the island was undergoing a climate emergency. This commits the island to carbon neutrality by 2030. On 31 Dec 2019, the Government of Jersey published the Carbon Neutral Strategy which aims to meet the island's carbon neutrality target. Plans of the Carbon Neutral Strategy include:

- A "people-powered" approach, possibly incorporating the parish and community governance as well as a Citizens' Assembly
- The introduction of a new Sustainable Transport Policy, including 1.55 million GBP in cycling, walking, bus travel and transition to electric vehicles

In order to adapt to the effects of sea level rise on the island, the Government has prepared a Shoreline Management Plan.

== Human geography ==
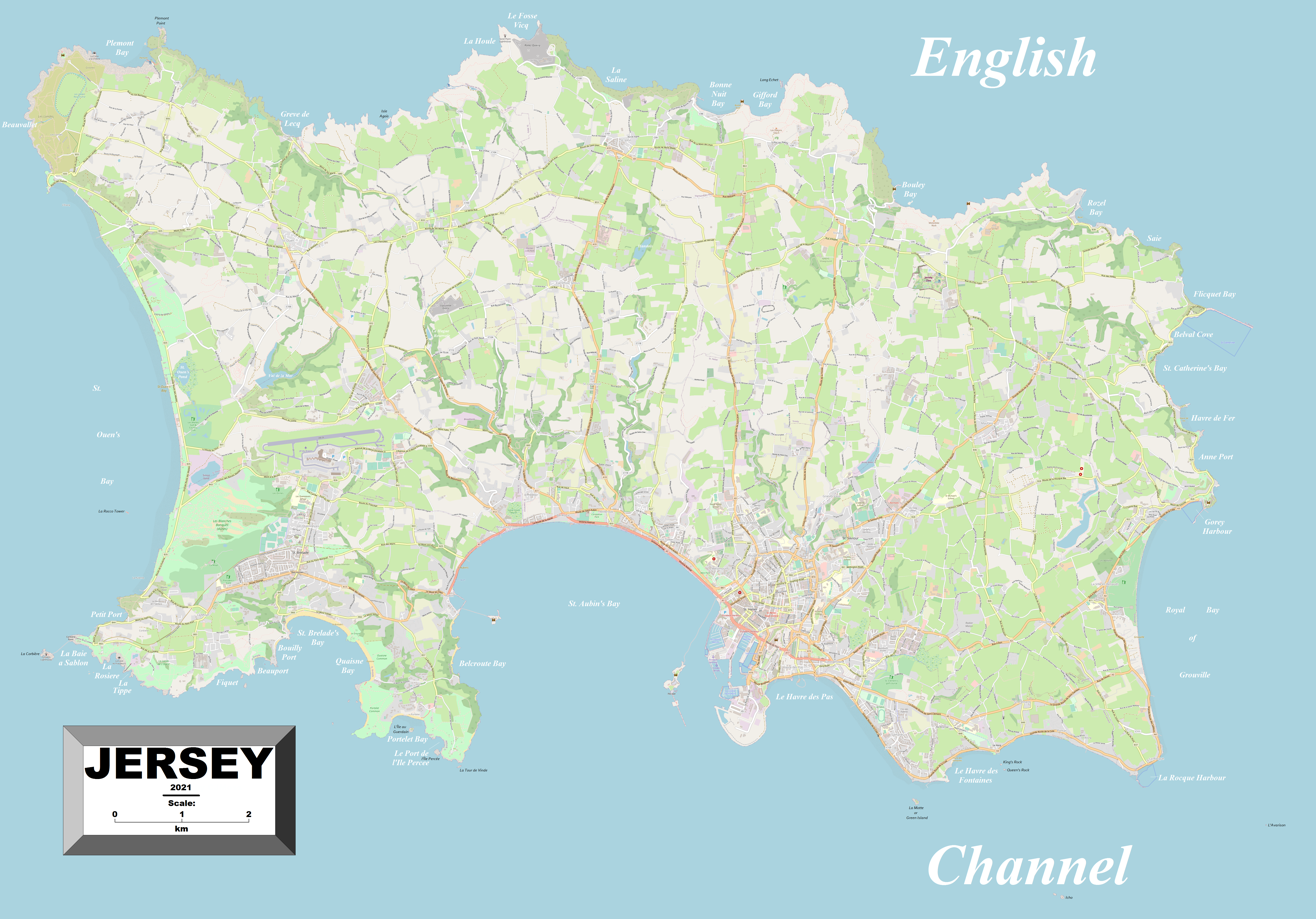
Detailed map of Jersey

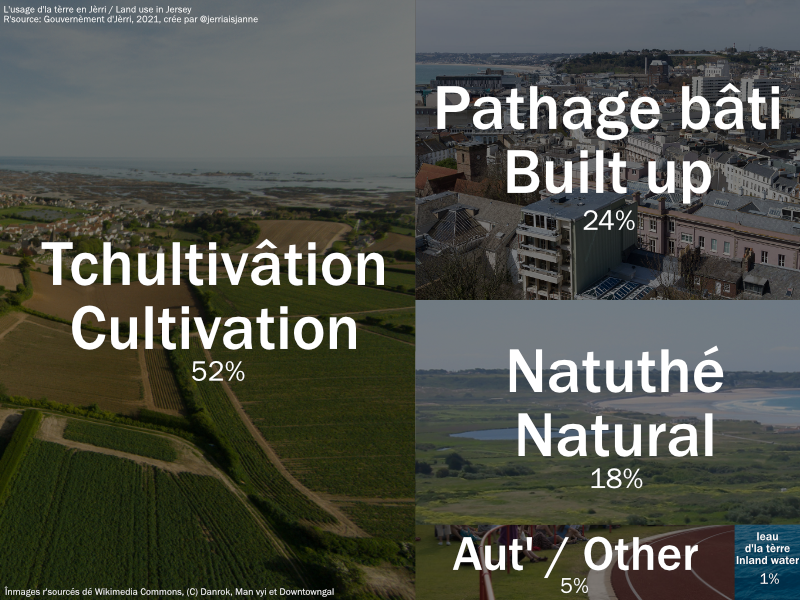
An infographic showing land uses in Jersey

Jersey has a population of 107,800 and a population density of roughly 917 people per square kilometre. The population is spread out throughout Jersey's twelve parishes, with population concentrated in the seven southern parishes.

Outside of the town, the land is largely separated into small closes, dissimilar to the larger fields found on Great Britain or the European continent. This land division structure has a long history in the island. In 1815, Quayle stated "no country is more strongly enclosed than Jersey".

=== Settlements ===
The settlement geography of Jersey has always been dispersed across the island, though with a much smaller population in the past. In the 19th century, Jersey had no tendency towards village or centralised settlement, except in the growing town of St. Helier. On the 1795 Richmond Map, the land appears "excessively divided" into small closes and even around the parish churches, the houses are no denser than elsewhere.

Jersey can be defined as an urban island. The 2011 Island Plan defines the island's built-up areas as three main entities. The island effectively operates as a single conurbation, consisting of an urban core, suburbs and exurban rural communities.

The largest settlement is the town of St Helier, which also plays host to the island's seat of government. The town consists of the built-up area of southern St Helier, including First Tower, and some adjoining parts of St Saviour and St Clement, such as Georgetown. The town is the central business district, hosting a large proportion of the island's retail and employment, such as the finance industry.

The primary suburban areas of St Helier consist of the Five Oaks area in St Saviour, and developments along the coast, primarily along main roads to east and west of the town. The south and east coasts from St Aubin to Gorey are largely urbanised, with only small gaps in their development, such as the Royal Golf Course in Grouville.

Outside of the town, many islanders live in rural and village settlements and even the more rural areas of the island have considerable amounts of development (even St Ouen, the least densely populated parish still has 270 persons per square kilometre). The most notable exurban development is the Les Quennevais area, which is home to a small precinct of shops, a park and a leisure centre. Many people in these communities regularly travel to St Helier for work and leisure purposes.

Most of the villages are the namesake settlement of their parish, for example St John's Village in St John, however some are not, such as Maufant Village on the border of St Saviour and St Martin. Another semantic term used for smaller settlements are villes (different in meaning from the term with the same name meaning 'Town') such as La Ville au Bas in St. Lawrence.

Housing costs in Jersey are very high. The Jersey House Price Index has at least doubled between 2002 and 2020. The mix-adjusted house price for Jersey is £567,000, higher than any UK region (UK average: £249,000) including London (average: £497,000; highest of any UK region).

=== Planning and development control ===
Land use is tightly controlled in Jersey, especially due to the high density population. The Planning Team of the Customer and Local Services Department manages planning applications, but approval is granted by the Planning Committee, made of States Members.

The governing development plan for the island is the Island Plan, last published in 2011 and voted on by the States Assembly. The plan decides the overall vision for development on the island as well as issuing baseline planning guidance. The current Island Plan was issued in 2011 and revised in 2014. In 2021, the Island Plan is under review, with a bridging Island Plan expected to be in place from 2022.

The Revised 2011 Island Plan is centred of three simple concepts of countryside protection, the wise use of resources and urban regeneration. It aims to meet most development needs in the existing built-up areas, especially the town of St Helier.

Jersey has a single national park known as the Coastal National Park, formed of a number of separate areas. The park includes St Ouen's Bay, Gorey Common, the north and south-west coast and certain valleys such as St Catherine's Woods. It also includes the offshore reefs part of the Bailiwick. In the national park, most forms of development are not permitted.

Jersey has a green belt policy known as the Green Zone. This consists of most rural areas on the island except the national park. There is a general presumption against development in the zone. According to the plan the policy has "vigorous" public support.

=== Political geography ===
The Bailiwick of Jersey is a British Crown Dependency. It is self-governing with its own legislature, the States Assembly, and government. It is sovereign territory of the Crown and not part of the United Kingdom, however the UK is internationally responsible for Jersey. The Jersey government is "with some important caveats, content with their relationship with the Ministry of Justice".^{:para 13}

Jersey is part of the British-Irish Council, which is formed of the national governments of each of the countries and dependencies in the British Isles. Jersey is neither a member of the United Nations nor the European Union.

The island is divided into twelve administrative regions, known as parishes, the largest of which is St Ouen and the smallest of which is St Clement.

=== Economic geography ===
Jersey has a highly developed economy driven by international financial and legal services, which accounted for 40.4% of total GVA in 2023. Its gross national income per capita is among the highest in the world. The island has been criticised by some as a tax haven as it attracts deposits from customers outside the island seeking lower taxes. However, the Jersey financial sector disputes this claim. Other important sectors to the Jersey economy include construction, retail and wholesale, agriculture and tourism.
