= BBC Spotlight =

British TV news programme (since 1962)

- Title card used since April 2022
- Theme music composer: David Lowe
- Country of origin: United Kingdom
- Original language: English

Production
- Producers: BBC News; BBC South West
- Production locations: BBC Broadcasting House; Plymouth, Devon
- Camera setup: Multi-camera
- Running time: 30 minutes (main 6:30 pm programme); 10 minutes (1:30 pm and 10:30 pm programmes); Various (on weekends and Breakfast)

Original release
- Network: BBC One South West; BBC One Channel Islands
- Release: 17 September 1962 – present

BBC Spotlight is the BBC's regional TV news programme for the South West of England, covering Cornwall (including the Isles of Scilly), Devon, southern and western Somerset, western Dorset and the Channel Islands.

== Overview ==
BBC Spotlight is broadcast from the BBC Broadcasting House in Seymour Road, Plymouth, with smaller studios based in Exeter, Truro, Taunton, Dorchester, St Peter Port, and St. Helier, from where an opt-out service for the Channel Islands is broadcast on weekdays.

The main half-hour edition of the programme airs at 6.30 pm on weekdays with shorter bulletins airing during BBC Breakfast and at 1.30 pm on weekdays, after the BBC News at Ten from Sunday to Friday and on weekend evenings.

The programme can also be viewed anywhere in the UK (and Europe) on Sky channel 967/968 on the BBC UK regional TV on satellite service and on demand via the BBC iPlayer.

Its main competitors are ITV West Country's main evening programme ITV News West Country in Cornwall, Devon, southern and western Somerset and western Dorset; and ITV Channel Television's main evening programme ITV News Channel TV in the Channel Islands.

Central and East Dorset including Bournemouth, Poole and most of Dorchester is served by South Today received from the Rowridge TV transmitter. North of Dorset including Shaftesbury and all of Somerset is served by Points West that is receive from the Mendip TV transmitter.

== History ==
When the BBC introduced regional television news on 30 September 1957, viewers in the South West were initially served by a five-minute bulletin from Bristol shared with what would become the BBC West and BBC South regions. For geographical reasons, the timeslot for regional news had to be shared with a bulletin for Wales.

In the same year, a Plymouth newsroom had been officially opened to cover Devon and Cornwall for both the television bulletins and bespoke radio bulletins, which had launched on the BBC Home Service on 1 October 1956.

Separate bulletins for the South region were launched in January 1961, but the forthcoming launch of the rival ITV service from Westward Television prompted the launch of bespoke News from the South West bulletins on 20 April 1961, just nine days before Westward went on air. The first ten-minute bulletin was read by Tom Salmon, who later became a producer and regional TV manager, A small television studio was especially constructed within the BBC's Plymouth centre - with facilities built at a cost of £50,000.

Within a year, the BBC was planning to expand the ten-minute regional slot into a 20-minute slot for daily news magazine programmes for the nations and regions. After a number of pilots were produced under the title Six to Six Twenty, the new South West at Six programme launched on 17 September 1962, presented by Peter Crampton with Sheila Tracy deputising. The programme's first editor was John Tainton, the area news editor for the South West and one of the BBC's first Plymouth-based journalists.

Just over a year later, South West at Six was relaunched again and adopted the title Spotlight South West (later Spotlight) on 30 September 1963. The programme reached its 500th edition on 13 September 1965.

TV facilities at the Plymouth studios have been periodically expanded with the building of a new 1,500 sq ft (140 m^{2}) colour television studio in 1972–1973. An industrial dispute involving technicians delayed the first colour edition of Spotlight until 5 August 1974. In 1978, it became the first BBC regional news programme to employ its own meteorologist, Craig Rich, who continued with the BBC for 25 years.

The Spotlight production team also contributed networked features and regional opt-outs to the BBC's Breakfast Time when it launched in January 1983. In the same year, the Plymouth studios began introducing ENG cameras for newsgathering with film being gradually phased out by July 1987.

A further refurbishment at the BBC's Plymouth studios led to the introduction of new computer technology and production systems in 1991, followed later in the decade by the introduction of satellite newsgathering facilities.

A replacement purpose-built broadcasting centre on the opposite side of Sutton Harbour from the Barbican was due to replace the Seymour Road studios in 2011 but the plans later stalled due to the effect of the recession on the construction industry and a change in the original plans. In late 2012, the owner of the harbour expressed fears the move may never happen and admitted other parties had expressed an interest in moving to the site earmarked for the BBC.

In 2013, the BBC confirmed that it was not moving to Sutton Harbour and instead opted for a further refurbishment of its existing headquarters at Seymour Road.

== Presenters ==
Victoria Graham presents the 6.30 pm programme. Another longstanding presenter is Natalie Cornah, who also presents the main programme.

=== News ===
- Victoria Graham
- Natalie Cornah

=== Weather ===
- David Braine
- Emily Wood

== Former on-air team members ==
- Fern Britton
- Jill Dando (deceased)
- Simon Hall
- Will Hanrahan
- Justin Leigh
- Sue Lawley
- Juliet Morris
- Chris Rogers (deceased)
- Craig Rich (weather presenter) (deceased)
- Angela Rippon
- Hugh Scully (deceased)
- Sheila Tracy (deceased)

== BBC Channel Islands ==
BBC Channel Islands title card used since April 2022

BBC Channel Islands is the dedicated opt-out service for the Channel Islands.

Although the BBC maintained a newsgathering presence on the Islands - expanded with the arrival of BBC Radio Jersey and BBC Radio Guernsey in 1982 - budgetary constraints had prevented the corporation from providing its own local TV news service to compete with the established ITV service from Channel Television.

In 1988, a minimal service was established with a short two-minute bulletin following the BBC Nine O'Clock News on weeknights, broadcast from a self-op studio at the Fremont Point transmitter and presented by an on-duty newsreader from Radio Jersey.

The basic facilities at Fremont Point were later expanded when the service was expanded to two evening bulletins - an opt-out at 6.30 pm during Spotlight and a late bulletin at 10.30 pm on weeknights - before production moved to the studios of BBC Radio Jersey at St Helier in 2005.

The opt-outs are usually presented by Charlie McArdle and produced by a team of multi-skilling journalists who write, film and edit their own stories, as well as producing and directing the bulletins on weekdays. The main opt takes up the first 12 minutes of BBC Spotlight at 6.30 pm with a further bulletin at 10:30 pm. No opt-outs are broadcast during the day and at weekends, except for special occasions such as local elections or major sporting events such as the Island Games.
