= BBC Radio Jersey =

Coordinates: 49.1901°N 2.1112°W

- Saint Helier; Jersey
- Frequencies: FM: 88.8 MHz; DAB+: 12A; Freeview: 711
- RDS: BBC JRSY

Programming
- Language: English
- Format: Local news, talk and music

Ownership
- Owner: BBC Local Radio, BBC South West

History
- First air date: 15 March 1982
- Former frequencies: AM: 1026 kHz

Technical information
- Licensing authority: Ofcom

Links
- Website: BBC Radio Jersey

BBC Radio Jersey is the BBC's local radio station serving the Bailiwick of Jersey.

It broadcasts on FM, DAB+, Freeview and via BBC Sounds from studios on Parade Road in St Helier. The station ceased broadcasting on MW on 31 March 2026.

According to RAJAR, the station has a weekly audience of 21,000 listeners and a 12.9% share as of December 2023.

== Overview ==
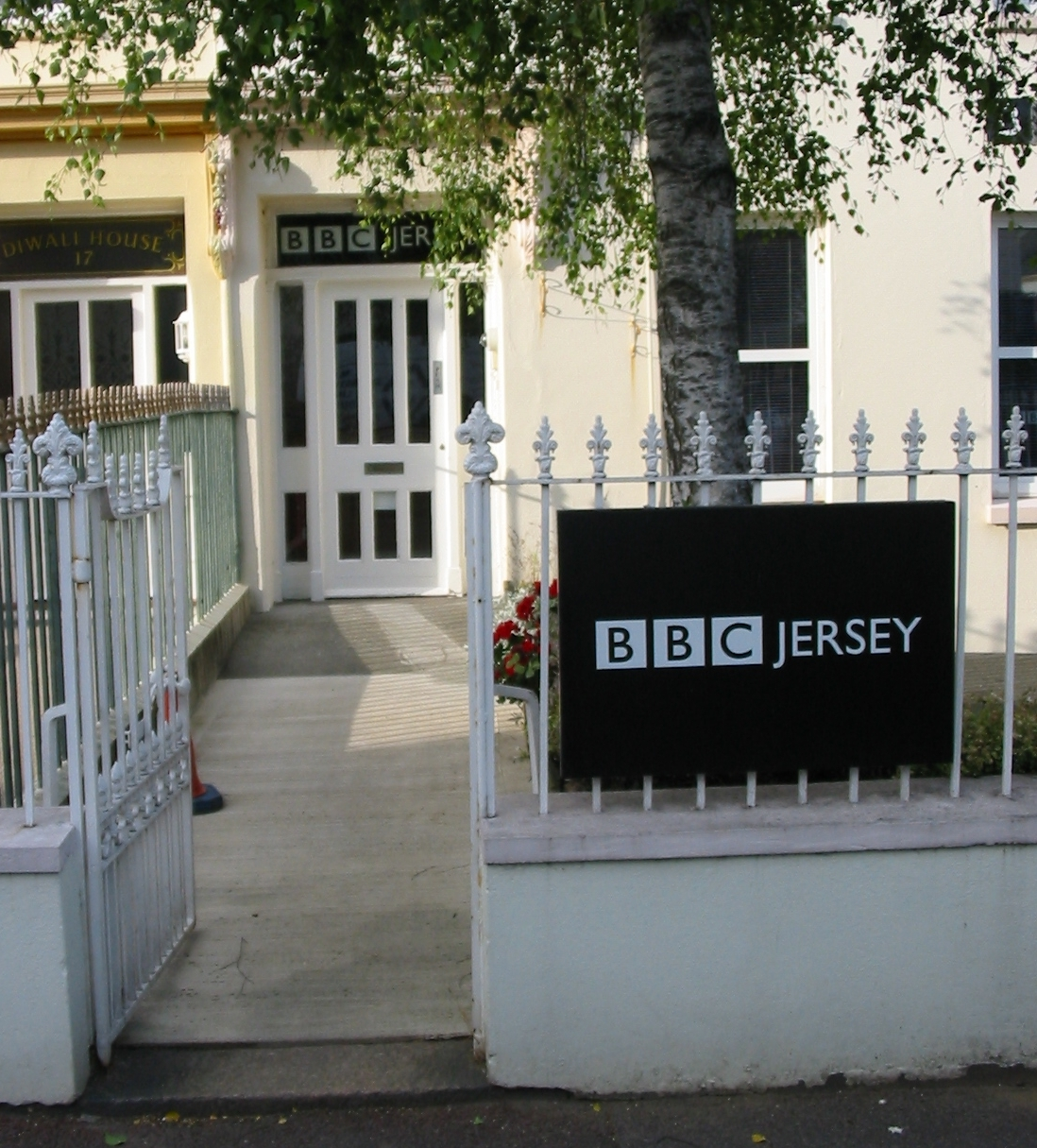
Entrance to BBC Radio Jersey in Parade Road, St Helier

The station first aired on 15 March 1982, when it was opened by George Howard, the then chairman of the BBC. The first voice to be heard was that of Peter Gore who was one of the four-person start-up team headed by Mike Warr. It launched from Broadcasting House, just off Rouge Bouillon in St Helier, and moved to its present premises in Parade Road in March 1994.

Roger Bara, a long-standing breakfast show presenter, retired in 2012.

In recent years, local output has been reduced to eight hours on weekdays, coinciding with an increase in regional programming shared with sister station BBC Radio Guernsey.

Like other BBC enterprises in Jersey, funding comes primarily from television licence fees collected in Jersey.

In addition to its FM frequency, the station also broadcasts on Freeview TV channel 711 and streams online via BBC Sounds. Transmissions on DAB began on 1 August 2021 with the launch of the Channel Islands DAB multiplex, on which BBC Radio Guernsey also broadcasts, alongside BBC Radio Jersey Xtra, a part-time stream carrying the station's former AM opt-out content (chiefly parliamentary coverage), and a similar opt-out for Radio Guernsey. The stations are the first BBC stations to use the DAB+ standard - at the time of launch, all stations on the BBC National DAB multiplex, and all other BBC Local Radio stations on the UK mainland, used the earlier DAB format.

== Location ==
The radio station shares premises at 18–21 Parade Road in St Helier with BBC Channel Islands television news, and BBC Jersey's online services.

== Programming ==
Local programming is produced and broadcast from the BBC's St Helier studios from 6 am to 2 pm on weekdays.

Regional programming for the Channel Islands, shared with BBC Radio Guernsey, airs from 2 pm to 10 pm on Mondays/Fridays, from 2pm-6pm Tuesdays/Wednesdays, 2pm to 8pm on Thursdays, also from 6 am to 8 pm on Saturdays and from 6 am to 2pm on Sundays.

Off-peak programming originates from BBC Radio Cornwall in Truro, BBC Radio Manchester and BBC Radio London

During the station's downtime, BBC Radio Jersey simulcasts overnight programming from BBC Radio 5 Live and until recently, the station's AM frequencies used to simulcast Radio 5 Live on weekday evenings to provide better coverage of the station on AM during the hours of darkness.

== Management ==
Matthew Price, Executive Producer

== See also ==
- Mass media in Jersey
- Channel 103
- Contact 94
