= Fremont Point transmitting station =

Transmitting station on Jersey, Channel Islands

Fremont Point
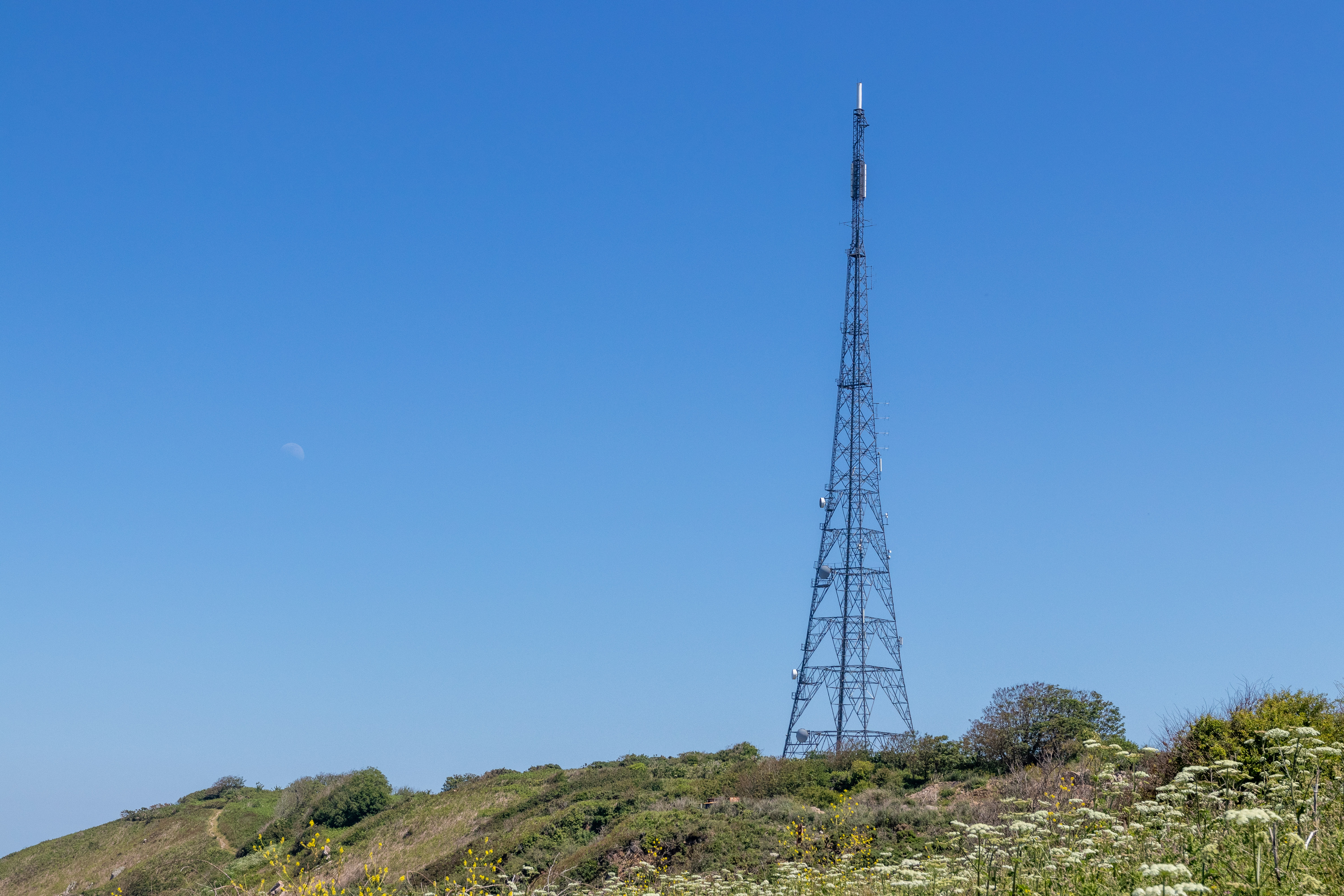
- Fremont Point tower.

- Location within Channel Islands
- Mast height: 139 metres (456 ft)
- Coordinates: 49.251667°N 2.131111°W
- Grid reference: UT634559
- Built: 1962
- BBC region: BBC Channel Islands
- ITV region: ITV Channel Television

The Fremont Point transmitting station is a facility for FM radio and television transmission at Fremont, Vingtaine du Nord, Saint John, Jersey.

It serves the whole of the Channel Islands, either directly or via the relay stations at Mont Orgueil, Alderney, Saint Brelade, Saint Helier, St Peter Port, Torteval and Les Touillets - the last of which is a high power relay which covers most of Guernsey. Its antennas are mounted on a 139-metre-tall (456 ft) tower built of lattice steel. That transmitter was previously located at Lichfield in Staffordshire. It is owned by Arqiva. DAB radio on VHF Band III is transmitted from the nearby Les Platons site.

== History ==
The transmitter was constructed by the then Independent Television Authority to bring Independent Television to the Channel Islands in the form of the ITV franchise Channel Television. The BBC had already been transmitting their BBC Television Service (renamed BBC1 from April 1964) to the Channel Islands from the "Les Platons" transmitter site since October 1955.

Channel Television commenced broadcasting from the transmitter on 1 September 1962.

On 24 July 1976 the transmitter became the main transmitter site in the Channel Islands and commenced broadcasting in UHF 625 line for the first time, not only for Channel Television but also for BBC1 and BBC2 (BBC2 launched in the Channel Islands on the same day, with the Channel Islands being the last region to get BBC2).

Colour television also commenced for the first time on 24 July 1976 from the transmitter. The Channel Islands were the last region to get colour television due to the technical difficulties in providing a UHF link from the UK mainland to the Channel Islands.

== Services available ==
=== Analogue radio ===
Frequency	kW	Service
103.7 MHz	6 (3h+3v)	Channel 103

=== Digital television ===
Since 17 November 2010, Fremont Point broadcasts digital television only, replacing the old analogue services. Only 3 of the 6 digital multiplexes are available from this transmitter.

Frequency	UHF	kW	Operator	System
634.000 MHz	41	3.2	Digital 3&4	DVB-T
658.000 MHz	44	3.2	BBC A	DVB-T
682.000 MHz	47	3.2	BBC B	DVB-T2

=== Analogue television ===
Analogue television was broadcast from the transmitter from September 1962 until 01:30 GMT on 17 November 2010.

Frequency	UHF	kW	Service
631.25 MHz	41	20	ITV Channel Television
655.25 MHz	44	20	BBC2
679.25 MHz	47	20	Channel 4
711.25 MHz	51	20	BBC1 Channel islands

== Relays ==
=== Digital television ===
Fremont Point (blue) and its relays (green).

Transmitter	kW	BBCA	BBCB	D3&4	Pol.	A.G.
Alderney	0.2	49	55	60	V	C/D
Gorey	0.01	59	48	52	V	W
Les Touillets	1.5	54	51	56	H	C/D
St Brelades Bay	0.015	59	48	52	V	C/D
St Helier	0.04	52	48	59	V	C/D
St Peter Port	0.01	24	21	27	V	A
Torteval	0.02	59	48	50	V	E
