= Oscar Puffin =

Television station mascot in the Channel Islands

- Oscar in the Puffin's Pla(i)ce studio
- First appearance: 3 March 1963
- Created by: ITV Channel Television

In-universe information
- Species: Puffin
- Gender: Male
- Nationality: Channel Islander

Oscar Grosnez Corbière Claud Puffin, known as Oscar Puffin, is a television station mascot for ITV Channel Television. Oscar was the star of the birthday greetings programme Puffin's Pla(i)ce and was the last remaining ITV regional mascot to have an on-screen presence. His show was on television from 3 March 1963 until 15 September 2013.

He was born on the island of Burhou in the Channel Islands.

== Early development ==
To introduce Oscar Puffin to viewers, it was claimed that Oscar had been watching Channel Television since its inception in September 1962 and was concerned that there was no on-screen children's birthday club for Channel Islandschildren. Oscar decided to start one himself, but was in the unfortunate situation of not possessing a name. Therefore, a competition to name him was run in the Channel Islands' local television listing magazine, The Channel Viewer, during February 1963. There were several winners of the competition that include Christine Tongs from Guernsey chose the name 'Oscar', Caroline Romeril from Jersey chose the name 'Grosnez' and Ann Balshaw of Guernsey chose the names 'Corbière Claud'.

== Puffin's Pla(i)ce TV show ==
Puffin's Pla(i)ce is a Channel Islands children's programme named after its star, Oscar Puffin, that was broadcast on ITV Channel Television on weekend afternoons (usually just before ITV News Channel TV). The programme, one of the longest-running children's series on the ITV network, had been broadcast since 3 March 1963.

Originally presented by Channel Television's team of continuity announcers, Puffin's Pla(i)ce presenters have included Stewart McDonald, Matthew Shaw, Kevin Pamplin, Sam Palmano, Lucy Anderson and Jenny Mullin.

In September 2013, it was announced that the show would no longer be broadcast on TV, but would move to an online format at the Channel Online website, but was quietly dropped soon after. The last TV edition was broadcast on 15 September 2013.

== Present ==
Although Oscar no longer has his own show, he remains the mascot of the ITV regional service in the Channel Islands. He does make occasional appearances both on television and online and regularly makes updates on Twitter that have a strong element of absurdity.

In 2018, rare footage of Oscar was aired at the British Film Institute.
