= BBC Radio Guernsey =

Coordinates: 49.4789°N 2.5175°W

- St Sampson and St Peter Port; United Kingdom
- Broadcast area: Bailiwick of Guernsey and Sark
- Frequencies: FM: 93.2 MHz (Guernsey and Sark); FM: 99.0 MHz (Alderney); DAB+: 12A; Freeview: 713
- RDS: BBC GNSY

Programming
- Language: English
- Format: Local news, talk and music

Ownership
- Owner: BBC Local Radio, BBC South West

History
- First air date: 16 March 1982
- Former frequencies: AM: 1116 kHz

Technical information
- Licensing authority: Ofcom

Links
- Website: BBC Radio Guernsey

BBC Radio Guernsey is the BBC's local radio station serving the Bailiwick of Guernsey. It broadcasts on FM, DAB, digital TV and via BBC Sounds from studios on Bulwer Avenue in St Sampson. The station stopped broadcasting on MW on 31 March 2026.

According to RAJAR, the station has a weekly audience of 12,000 listeners and a 10.2% share as of December 2023.

== Overview ==
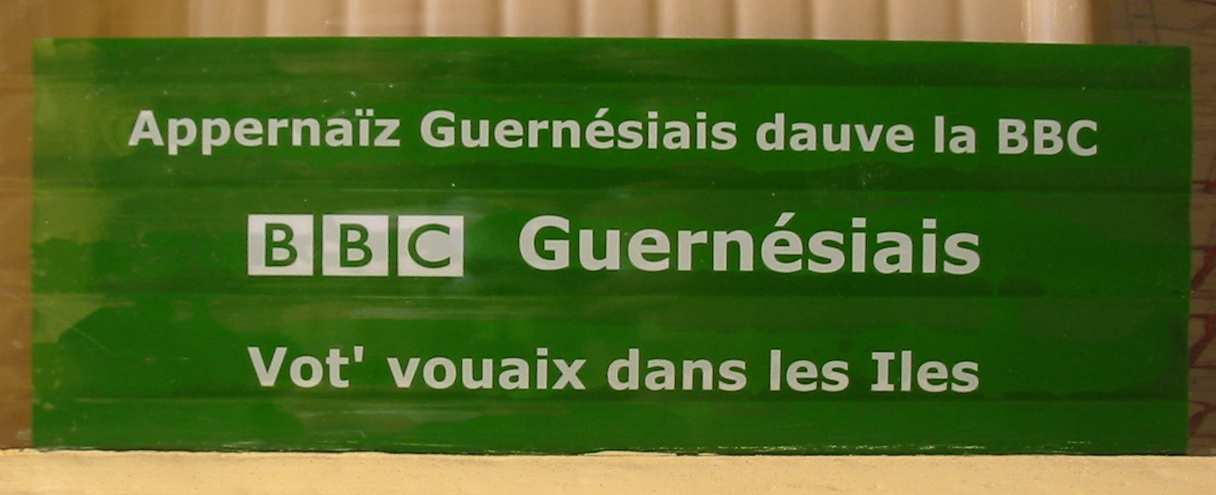
Publicity sticker: Learn Guernésiais with the BBC – BBC Guernsey – Your voice in the Islands

BBC Radio Guernsey has grown from a small part-time radio operation in the early 1980s into a full tri-media broadcaster, providing locally produced radio, online and TV services. Each week, the station broadcasts 40 hours of local programming ranging from news and current affairs to music and conversation.

Like other BBC enterprises in Guernsey, funding comes primarily from television licence fees collected in Guernsey itself.

In recent years, local output has been reduced to eight hours on weekdays, coinciding with an increase in regional programming shared with sister station BBC Radio Jersey.

In addition to its FM frequencies, the station also broadcasts on Freeview TV channel 713 and streams online via BBC Sounds. Transmissions on DAB began on 1 August 2021 with the launch of the Channel Islands DAB multiplex, on which BBC Radio Jersey also broadcasts, alongside BBC Radio Guernsey Xtra, a part-time stream carrying the station's former AM opt-out content (chiefly parliamentary coverage), and a similar opt-out for Radio Jersey. The stations are the first BBC stations to use the DAB+ standard – at the time of launch, all stations on the BBC National DAB multiplex, and all other BBC Local Radio stations on the UK mainland, used the earlier DAB format.

== Programming ==
Local programming is produced and broadcast from the BBC's Saint Sampson studios from 6 am to 2 pm on weekdays.

Regional programming for the Channel Islands, shared with BBC Radio Jersey, airs from: 2pm to 10pm on Mondays/Fridays, 2pm to 6pm on Tuesdays/Wednesdays, 2pm to 8pm on Thursdays, 6am to 8pm on Saturdays and 6am to 2pm on Sundays. Off-peak programming originates from BBC Radio Cornwall in Truro, BBC Radio Manchester and BBC Radio London.

During the station's downtime, BBC Radio Guernsey simulcasts overnight programming from BBC Radio 5 Live.

== Management ==
Matthew Price (broadcaster), Executive Producer

== See also ==
- BBC Radio Jersey
