= Timeline of Anglia Television =

This is a timeline of the history of Anglia Television (now known as ITV Anglia), the ITV franchise holder for the East of England.

== 1950s ==
- 1959
  - 27 October – Anglia Television starts broadcasting from Mendlesham transmitting station on VHF channel 11 to Norfolk, Suffolk and Essex.

== 1960s ==
- 1960
  - 2 June – About Anglia launches as a twice-weekly programme accompanying the 10-minute regional evening news bulletin on weekdays. Its success prompted it to be extended to four nights a week the following September and then every weeknight.
- 1961
  - 1 February – The first episode of Anglia's natural history programme Survival is broadcast on ITV, It had been developed from a regional nature programme called Countryman which Anglia had broadcast the previous year.
- 1962
  - 30 September – Anglia Television launches a weekly regional football highlights programme called Match of the Week.
- 1963
  - No events.
- 1964
  - Anglia is given a three-year extension to its licence. This is later extended by a further year.
- 1965
  - 5 July – Anglia starts broadcasting on VHF channel 6 from Sandy Heath transmitting station, extending coverage into Bedfordshire, Cambridgeshire and Northamptonshire. Until late 1966, there were no morning broadcasts from this transmitter due to a clash with the Mullard Radio Astronomy Observatory.
  - 20 December – Anglia starts broadcasting on VHF channel 7 from Belmont transmitting station, extending coverage into Lincolnshire, eastern Yorkshire and northern parts of Norfolk.
- 1966
  - No events.
- 1967
  - The Independent Television Authority renews Anglia's licence for a further seven years.
- 1968
  - 2 August – A technicians strike forces ITV off the air for several weeks although management manage to launch a temporary ITV Emergency National Service with no regional variations.
- 1969
  - 7 June – Anglia begins talks with Yorkshire Television about a cost-cutting exercise by sharing equipment and facilities. Neither company planned joint productions or a merger. The reason to form an association was purely down to the costs of the increased levy on the companies advertising revenue by the government and the cost of colour TV. The ITA stated there was no reason why the companies should not have talks about sensible economies that could be made, but would examine all details before any association were to be implemented.
  - November – The Anglia knight ident is remade with constant lighting with the knight constantly rotating on a turntable, a longer version of the ident was used at the start of the day's transmission until the mid-1980s.

== 1970s ==
- 1970
  - 1 January – A warning is given that regionalism would be abandoned and a forced merger between Yorkshire Television and Anglia Television would happen unless the chancellor reduced the levy applied on advertising revenues which the government agreed to a few months later.
  - 1 October – Anglia starts broadcasting in colour on UHF from Sudbury transmitting station to Suffolk and Essex.
- 1971
  - 18 January – The Sandy Heath transmitter begins transmitting in colour on UHF.
  - 24 May – Anglia starts broadcasting in colour on UHF from Tacolneston transmitting station to Norfolk. On the same day, the Belmont transmitter also begins transmitting in colour on UHF.
  - 9 October – Anglia's long-running game show Sale of the Century airs its first episode.
- 1972
  - 16 October – Following a law change which removed all restrictions on broadcasting hours, ITV is able to launch an afternoon service.
- 1973
  - No events.
- 1974
  - 30 July – Following the 1974 franchise round, the Belmont transmitter in Lincolnshire is switched from Anglia Television to Yorkshire Television.
- 1975
  - No events.
- 1976
  - No events.
- 1977
  - No events.
- 1978
  - No events.
- 1979
  - 10 August – The ten week ITV strike forces Anglia Television off the air. The strike ends on 24 October.

== 1980s ==
- 1980
  - 25 January – Three new low-powered relay stations carrying Anglia are built in North Norfolk to improve reception in that area following public pressure from 70,000 viewers who since 1974 had been served by Yorkshire Television. Many of these viewers had gone to "considerable trouble and expense" to receive Anglia Television.
  - 28 December – The Independent Broadcasting Authority announces the new contractors to commence on 1 January 1982 and Anglia Television is reawarded its licence. However, there had been a challenger, from East of England Television.
- 1981
  - No events.
- 1982
  - No events.
- 1983
  - 1 February – ITV's breakfast television service TV-am launches. Consequently, Anglia's broadcast day now begins at 9:25am.
  - 6 November – The last episode of the original run of Sale of the Century airs.
- 1984
  - No events.
- 1985
  - 3 January – Anglia's last day of transmission using the 405-lines system.
- 1986
  - No events.
- 1987
  - 28 August – Anglia begins 24-hour transmissions with its service 'Through the Night'.
  - 7 September – Following the transfer of ITV Schools to Channel 4, ITV provides a full morning programme schedule, with advertising, for the first time. The new service includes regular five-minute national and regional news bulletins.
- 1988
  - 21 March
    - The silver statue of a knight on horseback ident is consigned to history, having served as Anglia's ident since the station went on air 29 years earlier. It is replaced by a new identity, a quasi-heraldic stylised 'A' made of triangles, designed by Robinson Lambie-Nairn at a cost of £500,000. The knight continued to have a presence as it was moved to the Anglia headquarters reception.
    - About Anglia is given a new look to coincide with the ident change.
- 1989
  - 1 September – ITV introduces its first official logo as part of an attempt to unify the network under one image whilst retaining regional identity. Anglia does not adopt the logo and continues to use the ident it introduced the previous year.

== 1990s ==
- 1990
  - 9 July – About Anglia ends and is replaced by Anglia News. The change sees Anglia produce two separate news services, East (Norfolk, Suffolk and Essex) and West (Cambridgeshire, Northamptonshire, Bedfordshire, Northern Hertfordshire, Northern Buckinghamshire, Southern Lincolnshire, Southern Rutland and a small part of Southern Leicestershire).
- 1991
  - 1 September – Anglia's Through the Night service ends. It is replaced by the generic overnight service from London.
  - 16 October – The Independent Television Commission announces the results of the franchise round. Anglia Television is reawarded its licence having bid £17.8 million to see off two rival bidders, Three East Television and CPV-TV.
- 1992
  - No events.
- 1993
  - 16 March – Anglia forges a partnership with American pay-TV network HBO, owned by Time Warner. Under this arrangement, Anglia acquired half-ownership in Citadel, an HBO production subsidiary, Time Warner subsequently acquired 50 percent of Itel, Anglia's distribution unit. In addition, a new company was formed, Anglia Television Entertainment, 51% owned by Anglia and 49% owned by HBO.
- 1994
  - 19 February – Anglia Television is bought by MAI (owners of Meridian Broadcasting). who merged with United Newspapers to form United News and Media.
- 1995
  - No events.
- 1996
  - No events.
- 1997
  - No events.
- 1998
  - 15 November – The public launch of digital terrestrial TV in the UK takes place.
- 1999
  - 8 November – A new, hearts-based on-air look is introduced. Anglia adopts the look which features the stylised "A", albeit in a square rather than a flag.

== 2000s ==
- 2000
  - No events.
- 2001
  - 30 January – After 40 years, Anglia's natural history programme Survival comes to an end.
  - 11 August – ITV’s main channel is rebranded as ITV1.
- 2002
  - 28 October – On-air regional identities are dropped apart from when introducing regional programmes and Anglia is renamed ITV1 Anglia.
- 2003
  - September – Anglia News is renamed Anglia News Tonight.
- 2004
  - 2 February
    - The final two remaining English ITV companies, Carlton and Granada, merge to create a single England and Wales ITV company called ITV plc.
    - Anglia News Tonight is renamed Anglia Tonight.
  - 31 October – The Anglia logo is seen at the end of its own programmes for the final time.
- 2005
  - No events.
- 2006
  - Anglia sells its Magdalen Street studio complex. They had been in use as an additional production base since the late 1970s.
  - 13 November – The ITV1 Anglia branding, still seen before some regional programming is dropped.
- 2007
  - No events.
- 2008
  - Anglia's GMTV and weekend regional news bulletins become pan-regional.
  - December – All non-news local programming ends after Ofcom gives ITV permission to drastically cut back its regional programming. From 2009, the only regional programme is the monthly political discussion show.
- 2009
  - February – ITV makes major cutbacks to its regional broadcasts in England and the two sub-regional news programmes are merged into a pan-regional programme, although more localised news continues to be broadcast as a brief opt-out during the early evening programme.

== 2010s ==
- 2010
  - No events.
- 2011
  - 23 November – The Anglia region completes its digital switchover.
- 2012
  - No events.
- 2013
  - 14 January – Anglia Tonight is renamed ITV News Anglia.
  - 16 September – Sub-regional news coverage is reintroduced and the weekday daytime, late evening and weekend bulletins as well as 20 minutes of the 6pm programme are once again more localised.

== See also ==
- History of ITV
- History of ITV television idents
- Timeline of ITV
