= Timeline of HTV West =

This is a timeline of the history of the British television service HTV West (now part of ITV West Country). "HTV West" and "ITV West" were the service names for the ITV service in the West of England from 1970 until 2009, after which the service name "ITV West Country" has been used across the West and South West of England. The "West" service was a sub-region of the franchise for Wales and the West.

== 1960s ==
- 1967
  - Harlech Consortium is awarded the franchise to broadcast to Wales and the West of England.
- 1968
  - 4 March – Ousted licensee TWW stops broadcasting five months before its contract was due to expire, selling the final months of airtime to Harlech. However, the new contractor is not yet ready to go on the air so the ITA authorises an interim service called Independent Television Service for Wales and the West, in which Harlech receives all advertising revenue, but sub-contracts production to TWW.
  - 20 May – Harlech Television takes over the Wales and the West of England franchise just over two months ahead of the planned handover date. Harlech inherits two TV services, one for all of Wales and the other for South Wales and the West of England.
  - August – A technicians strike forces ITV off the air for several weeks although management manage to launch a temporary ITV Emergency National Service with no regional variations.
- 1969
  - No events.

== 1970s ==
- 1970
  - 6 April – From this date, the name Harlech Television is dropped in favour of the initialism HTV. Other than being simpler, this helps to end concerns from the West of England that the 'Harlech' branding is only associated with the Welsh part of the dual region. HTV Wales starts broadcasting in colour.
  - 30 May – A separate HTV West service is launched in colour on UHF from the Mendip transmitter This allows for a new full-evening news programme for the region, called Report West. The HTV West service is in addition to its two other services, HTV Cymru Wales for Wales and its "general" 405-line VHF service for South Wales and the West of England.
- 1971
  - No events.
- 1972
  - 16 October – Following a law change which removed all restrictions on broadcasting hours, ITV is able to launch an afternoon service.
- 1973
  - No events.
- 1974
  - The 1974 franchise round sees no changes in ITV's contractors as it is felt that the huge cost in switching to colour television would have made the companies unable to compete against rivals in a franchise battle.
- 1975
  - No events.
- 1976
  - No events.
- 1977
  - No events.
- 1978
  - No events.
- 1979
  - 10 August – The ten week ITV strike forces HTV off the air. The strike ends on 24 October.

== 1980s ==
- 1980
  - No events.
- 1981
  - No events.
- 1982
  - Report West is renamed HTV News.
- 1983
  - 1 February – ITV's breakfast television service TV-am launches. Consequently, HTV's broadcast day now begins at 9:25am.
- 1984
  - No events.
- 1985
  - 3 January – HTV's last day of transmission using the 405-lines system, and the switch-off marks the final day of HTV's "general" service to South Wales and the West.
- 1986
  - No events.
- 1987
  - 7 September – Following the transfer of ITV Schools to Channel 4, ITV provides a full morning programme schedule, with advertising, for the first time. The new service includes regular five-minute national and regional news bulletins.
  - 28 September – HTV launches a new computer-generated ident.
- 1988
  - 22 August – HTV begins 24-hour broadcasting. The service, called Night Club, is broadcast on both HTV West and HTV Wales.
- 1989
  - 1 September – ITV introduces its first official logo as part of an attempt to unify the network under one image whilst retaining regional identity. HTV adopts the ident.

== 1990s ==
- 1990
  - May – HTV acquires the UK branch of Vestron Video International and renamed them to First Independent Films which was a British film distributor and home video company that replaced its UK operations.
  - 25 May – HTV West begins broadcasting in stereo from the Mendip transmitting station.
- 1991
  - 28 April – HTV closes its Night Club and replaces it with a simulcast of the overnight generic service from London.
  - 16 October – HTV retains its licence to broadcast when it bids the highest amount of a total of four applicants. Due to the size of the bid, £20.5 million, the company had to make considerable savings in order to cover the increased cost of the licence. The ITC had initially considered disqualifying HTV's bid because of its business plan, but it was ultimately allowed to bid.
- 1992
  - No events.
- 1993
  - 1 January – To coincide with the start of the new franchise period, HTV launches a new set of idents.
- 1994
  - 18 February – Flextech buys a 20% stake in the company, thereby clearing HTV's debts.
- 1995
  - 1 January – HTV launches a new set of idents.
  - September – Flextech sells its 20% stake in HTV to Scottish Television.
- 1996
  - October – United News & Media buys Scottish Television's 20% stake in HTV.
- 1997
  - 7 April – The main evening news programme is renamed The West Tonight. The change coincides with the opening of a digital broadcast centre at HTV's Bristol studios.
  - 28 June – HTV is fully taken over by United News & Media.
  - United News & Media puts the HTV-owned First Independent Films up for sale, following the commercial failure of the movie G.I. Jane in the UK. The assets are eventually acquired by Columbia TriStar Home Video who retained the First Independent Films label for 2 more years before fully absorbing it into their own label in 1999.
- 1998
  - 15 November – The public launch of digital terrestrial TV in the UK takes place.
- 1999
  - 8 November – A new, hearts-based on-air look is introduced and HTV adopts its version of the ident.

== 2000s ==
- 2000
  - Granada plc buys United's television interests, but at the time competition regulations limited the extent to which one company could control the ITV network and were consequently forced to give up one of its ITV franchises. This resulted in a break-up of HTV, whereby its broadcast facilities and Channel 3 broadcast licence (and hence its advertising revenues) are sold to Carlton Communications plc, owners of Carlton Television, whilst the majority of production facilities are retained by Granada which establishes offices in Whiteladies Road in Bristol, close to the BBC site at Broadcasting House.
- 2001
  - 11 August – ITV's main channel is rebranded ITV1.
- 2002
  - 28 October – On-air regional identities are dropped apart from when introducing regional programmes and HTV West is renamed ITV1 West of England. However, the regional news bulletins continue to be named HTV News until the ITV News relaunch of 2004.
- 2003
  - No events.
- 2004
  - 2 February
    - Granada merges with Carlton Communications, thereby creating a single England and Wales ITV company called ITV plc.
    - The HTV brand is finally consigned to history when the regional news service is renamed ITV West News.
- 2005
  - 12 September – The regional news programme is once again named The West Tonight, six years after the name had originally been dropped.
- 2006
  - 4 December – Central disbands its South Midlands sub-region and the parts of Gloucestershire served by Central South joins the majority of the county already covered by ITV West and begins receiving The West Tonight.
  - 29 December – HTV Ltd is renamed ITV Wales & West Ltd.
- 2007
  - No events.
- 2008
  - December – All non-news local programming ends after Ofcom gives ITV permission to drastically cut back its regional programming. From 2009, the only regional programme is the monthly political discussion show.
- 2009
  - 16 February – As part of major cutbacks across ITV to its regional broadcasts in England, the operations of ITV Westcountry and ITV West are merged into a new non-franchise region ITV West & Westcountry. The new region results in a merged regional news service based in Bristol called The West Country Tonight. However, the first half of the main programme and the entirety of the late evening bulletin remained separate.

== 2010s ==
- 2010
  - 24 March-7 April – Digital switchoverbegins with the transition at the Mendip transmitting station]]. BBC Two is switched off first with the other channels turned off two weeks later.
- 2011
  - 31 March – Digital switchover is completed in the region when the analogue transmissions at Ridge Hill (West) are switched off.
  - 5 September – Separate weekday daytime bulletins for the two regions (at breakfast and lunchtime) are reintroduced.
- 2012
  - No events.
- 2013
  - 16 September – ITV News West Country extends the East and West opt-out services to at least 20 minutes of the 6pm programme, in addition to separate weekend bulletins for the two sub-regions, effectively restoring full services for the two areas.
- 2014
  - 1 January – The Wales and West of England regions are formally split and a new region covering the merged West and South West regions, ITV West Country, is officially launched.

== See also ==
- Timeline of ITV in Wales – includes details of TWW, HTV's predecessor in both Wales and the West of England
- History of ITV
- History of ITV television idents
- Timeline of ITV
