= Timeline of ITV =

This is a timeline of the history of the British television network ITV (originally known as Independent Television).

== 1950s ==
- 1954
  - 30 July – The Television Act 1954 paves the way for the launch of commercial television in the UK and the first franchises are awarded by the newly formed Independent Television Authority (ITA).
  - 26 October – The first ITV franchises are awarded. They are for the London, Midlands and North of England regions.
- 1955
  - January – A consortium of the initial four Independent Television broadcasting companies launch ITN, which will provide ITV with its news service.
  - 22 September – ITV is launched when the first contractor, Associated-Rediffusion, goes on air, broadcasting to London on weekdays.
  - 24 September – ATV London (Associated Television) launches as the London weekend contractor.
- 1956
  - 6 January – The first edition of This Week is broadcast.
  - 17 February – ATV Midlands launches ITV in the Midlands and the following day the Midlands’ weekend contractor ABC Weekend TV broadcasts for the first time.
  - 3 May – Granada Television launches ITV in the north of England and two days later the north of England's weekend contractor ABC Weekend TV broadcasts for the first time.
- 1957
  - 13 May – ITV transmits a television programme for schools for the first time. It is broadcast by London's ITV contractor Associated-Rediffusion.
  - 31 August – ITV starts broadcasting in central Scotland – Scottish Television (STV) is the franchise holder.
- 1958
  - 14 January – Television Wales and the West (TWW) starts broadcasting to South Wales and the West of England.
  - 30 August – Southern Television launches.
- 1959
  - 15 January – Tyne Tees Television launches.
  - 27 October – Anglia Television launches.
  - 31 October – ITV launches in Northern Ireland when Ulster Television starts broadcasting.

== 1960s ==
- 1960
  - 31 January – Southern Television's broadcast area expands when it begins broadcasting to Kent and East Sussex following the Independent Television Authority granting Southern the right to broadcast to South East England.
  - 9 December – The first edition of Coronation Street is broadcast.
- 1961
  - 29 April – Westward Television launches.
  - 1 September – Border Television launches.
  - 30 September – Grampian Television launches.
- 1962
  - 1 September – Channel Television launches.
  - 14 September – The final part of the United Kingdom gets an ITV service when Wales (West and North) Television launches in West and North Wales as Teledu Cymru.
  - 22 September – Anglia Television becomes the first ITV company to show football highlights on a regular basis when it launches Match of the Week, which shows highlights of matches from around East Anglia. Over the next few years, other ITV companies begin showing regular football highlights programmes.
- 1963
  - 7 January – The first edition of World in Action is broadcast.
- 1964
  - 26 January – Wales (West and North) Television stops broadcasting after going bankrupt. It is replaced by TWW. However the Teledu Cymru on-air identity is retained.
  - All of the ITV contractors are given three-year extensions to their licence. This is later extended by a further year.
- 1965
  - 2 January – The first edition of World of Sport is broadcast.
  - 26 March – Border Television begins broadcasting to the Isle of Man.
  - 1965 sees the end of regular lunchtime programming on ITV. Most regions had broadcast a weekday lunchtime entertainment show since the earliest days of ITV.
- 1967
  - 3 July – News at Ten is launched as a 13-week trial of a nightly 30-minute bulletin. The programme is soon made a permanent feature of the schedules.
- 1968
  - 4 March – TWW stops broadcasting five months before its contract was due to expire. An interim service called Independent Television Service for Wales and the West is provided by TWW under Harlech management until 20 May when the new contractor, Harlech Television, takes over.
  - 29 July –
    - ATV starts broadcasting to the Midlands seven days a week and Granada starts broadcasting across the north west seven days a week. In both cases, ABC loses the right to broadcast.
    - Yorkshire Television launches following the decision to split the north region into two resulting in a new franchise being created for the Yorkshire area.
  - 30 July – Thames Television replaces Rediffusion as the holder of the London weekday franchise. Rediffusion retains a 49% stake in the new company.
  - 2 August — London Weekend Television (LWT) replaces ATV as London's weekend franchise.
  - 3 August – A technicians' strike forces ITV off the air for several weeks although management manage to launch a temporary service with no regional variations. The strike ends on 18 August.
  - 21 September — The TVTimes is launched as a national magazine to provide listings for the ITV network.
- 1969
  - 15 November – ITV starts broadcasting in colour from some transmitters, although it was not until 1976 that colour signals were available in every region.

== 1970s ==
- 1970
  - 31 May-21 June – ITV introduces a studio panel, joining presenters Brian Moore and Jimmy Hill to analyse the latest action in the 1970 World Cup. This is the first time a studio panel of pundits had been seen as part of UK sporting coverage.
  - 13 November – The Colour Strike begins when ITV staff refuse to work with colour television equipment following a dispute over pay with their management. The strike lasts for nearly three months.
  - 23 November – The first edition of Engineering Announcements is broadcast.
- 1971
  - 15 April – The Bilsdale UHF transmitter, on the border between Yorkshire Television and Tyne Tees Television and much disputed over, begins broadcasting Tyne Tees Television.
- 1972
  - 12 July – The Independent Broadcasting Authority (IBA) replaces the Independent Television Authority.
  - 16 October – Following a law change which removed all restrictions on broadcasting hours, ITV is able to launch an afternoon service. As part of the new service the first edition of Emmerdale Farm is broadcast and ITV's first lunchtime news programme, First Report, is shown. ITV Schools transfers to a new morning slot.
- 1973
  - 17 December – The British government imposes early close downs of all three television channels in the UK including ITV from 17 December 1973 in order to save electricity during the Three Day Week crisis. The early close downs forced ITV to end their broadcasting day at 10:30pm, thus losing the network a lot of advertising revenue. The restrictions were lifted temporarily on Christmas Eve to allow the public to enjoy festive programming. The restrictions recommenced on Monday 7 January 1974. The restrictions ended on 8 February 1974.
- 1974
  - The 1974 franchise round sees no changes in contractors. However the Belmont transmitter in Lincolnshire is switched from Anglia Television to Yorkshire Television.
- 1975
  - 23–26 May – A strike over the payments agreed before the government-imposed pay freeze came into force results in many ITV companies being unable to broadcast for 72 hours, apart from at London Weekend Television, Tyne Tees Television and Westward Television where ACTT members ignored the strike. However normal programming did not resume until 30 May, apart from at Scottish Television where the strike continued until 9 June.
- 1976
  - 26 July – Channel Television becomes the final ITV region to begin broadcasting in colour although it isn't until the following year that all of its local programmes are made in colour.
  - 6 September – News at One replaces First Report and the teatime news bulletin programme is extended by five minutes and renamed News at 5.45.
- 1977
  - 28 March – Yorkshire and Tyne Tees begin a nine-week trial of breakfast television.
  - Emmerdale Farm moves from daytime to a peak time (7 pm) slot although five regions – Anglia Television, Thames Television, Westward Television/TSW, Grampian Television and Scottish Television – aired the programme at 5:15pm.
- 1978
  - ITV's teletext service ORACLE launches.
- 1979
  - 10 August – A ten-week strike forces ITV off the air. Only Channel Television in the Channel Islands remained on air, as they had separate arrangements with the unions. Channel Television provided an emergency service each day running from 5:00pm until 11:00pm, filled with local programming, local news, imported films, and repeats from the ITV archive. The only programme shown on the rest of the network was the weekly edition of Engineering Announcements. The strike ends on 24 October.
  - 25 September – This Week ends its first run. It is replaced for the next seven years by TV Eye.
  - The Independent Broadcasting Authority begins broadcasting its own test card on ITV instead of Test Card F.

== 1980s ==
- 1980
  - 28 December – The IBA announces the new contractors to commence on 1 January 1982. The Midlands region will be split into two and dual regions will be created for Wales and the West and the South and South East. ATV is reawarded its contract for the Midlands although there are several conditions attached, including more regional content and increased production facilities in the Midlands. It is also told to rename itself and it chooses the name Central Independent Television. Southern Television lost its licence for the South of England, in favour of Television South (TVS) and Westward Television also lost its licence for South West England, to be replaced by Television South West (TSW). The IBA also announces that TV-am has been awarded the contract to provide a national breakfast television service, with a provisional launch in spring 1983.
  - 29 December – ITV launches its first branded children's slot when it launches Watch It!. The programmes are broadcast on weekdays between 4:15pm to 5:15pm and are presented live by the duty continuity announcer in each ITV region.
- 1981
  - 11 August – TSW takes over Westward Television but continues to use the Westward name until 1 January 1982.
  - 31 December – ATV, Southern and Westward stop broadcasting at the end of their day's programming – i.e. shortly after midnight.
- 1982
  - 1 January –
    - Central, TVS and TSW start broadcasting.
    - The Bluebell Hill transmitter in Kent is transferred from Thames/LWT to TVS, to increase the size of TVS's new South East sub-region.
    - Yorkshire extends its coverage on the Lancashire/Yorkshire border when transmitters covering Todmorden and Walsden were transferred from the Granada region.
    - The Kendal transmitter, covering much of southern Cumbria, is transferred from Granada to Border.
- 1983
  - 3 January – Children's ITV is launched, replacing Watch It!. Programmes begin 15 minutes earlier, at 4 pm – the extra fifteen minutes being filled by a repeat of one of the pre-school programmes shown at lunchtime the same day. The slot is presented on a national basis and programmes are linked by an in-vision presenter.
  - 1 February – ITV's breakfast television service TV-am launches, broadcasting between 6 AM and 9:15 am. It has been beaten to air by the BBC which launched Breakfast Time two weeks previously.
  - 17 May – Engineering Announcements is broadcast on ITV for the final time. The programme transfers to Channel 4 and continues until July 1990.
  - 23 May – TV-am changes its broadcasting hours. It now begins during the week at 6:25 am, with a later start at the weekend. However TV-am is now able to stay on air until 9:25 am due to the automation of the switching process from national to regional programming.
  - September – Central finally launches its East Midlands service. An industrial dispute had prevented Central from launching its East Midlands service until 21 months after Central actually launched.
  - 2 October – ITV shows a live top flight football match for the first time since 1960. This marks the start of English football being shown on a national basis rather than on a regional basis, resulting in The Big Match becoming a fully national programme.
- 1984
  - 16 October – The Bill launches as a regular programme, just over a year after a one-off episode – Woodentop – was shown.
- 1985
  - 3 January –
    - At 9.25am, transmissions using the 405-lines system end in England, Wales and Northern Ireland.
    - TV-am expands its broadcasting hours. Weekday programmes begin ten minutes earlier during the week, at 6:15 am and weekend programmes begin at 6:55 am.
  - 4 January – 405-line transmissions end in Scotland.
  - 28 September – The final edition of World of Sport is broadcast.
- 1986
  - 2 April – The first in-vision teletext service is seen on ITV when Central launches its Jobfinder service which broadcasts for one hour after the end of the day's programming. Many other regions launch their own Jobfinder service later in the 1980s.
  - 9 August – Yorkshire launches an experimental overnight service, simulcasting the satellite TV channel Music Box.
  - 11 September – After a seven-year hiatus, current affairs programme This Week returns.
- 1987
  - 3 January – Closedowns reappear on Yorkshire Television when its experiment with 24-hour television is put on hiatus.
  - 30 January –
    - Super Channel launches. The channel is majority owned by all but one of the ITV companies. Within a year the ITV companies sold their stake to the Italian Marcucci family, owners of Italian music channel Videomusic.
    - Yorkshire becomes the second ITV region to launch a Jobfinder service, broadcasting for an hour after closedown.
  - The first weeks of 1987 sees many of the larger ITV companies start broadcasting into the night.
  - 25 April – Central becomes the first station to keep its transmitters on air all night when it launches More Central. Programmes are shown until around 3am on weekdays and 4am at the weekend, with the rest of the night filled by its Jobfinder service.
  - 1 June – Thames launches Thames Into the Night. Consequently, the channel now stays on air until 4 am.
  - 29 June – Schools programmes are broadcast on ITV for the last time.
  - 20 July – The lunchtime news programme moves to 12:30pm and is renamed accordingly.
  - 17 August – Thames becomes the first ITV company to launch a full 24-hour service.
  - 28 August – LWT and Anglia begin 24-hour transmissions.
  - September – TV-am recommences broadcasting each day from 6 am.
  - 7 September – ITV launches a full morning programme schedule, with advertising, for the first time. The new service includes regular five-minute national and regional news bulletins.
  - 14 September – ITV Schools transfers to Channel 4 and S4C.
  - 7 December – Tyne Tees begins 24-hour broadcasting. It does so by launching a Jobfinder service which broadcasts each night from its usual close-down time until the start of TV-am at 6 am. Tyne Tees launches a full 24-hour service on 2 September 1988.
- 1988
  - 1 January – From this day, each programme on ITV is no longer preceded by the identifier of the regional company that had produced the show.
  - 6 January – After more than 15 years on air, for the first time Emmerdale Farm is shown by all ITV regions in a peak time slot of 6:30pm.
  - 15 February – An early morning 60-minute news programme – ITN Early Morning News – is launched but is only available in areas which have 24-hour broadcasting. The first 30 minutes of the programme includes a full broadcast of ITN's international news bulletin ITN World News. In addition, brief news summaries are broadcast at various points through the night. The launch coincides with three of the major ITV companies – Scottish, Central and Granada – beginning 24-hour transmission.
  - 7 March – The lunchtime news returns to the 1 pm slot.
  - 4 April – After nearly 24 years on air, the final edition of Crossroads is broadcast. It is briefly revived in 2001.
  - 29–30 May – The first ITV Telethon takes place over the spring bank holiday weekend.
  - 30 May – TVS and Channel begin 24-hour broadcasting and Yorkshire recommences 24-hour broadcasting.
  - 22 August – HTV begins 24-hour broadcasting.
  - 2 September – TSW, Grampian and Border begin 24-hour broadcasting.
  - 3 October –
    - Ulster becomes the final region to start broadcasting 24 hours a day.
    - The first edition of This Morning is broadcast.
  - 30 October – Following the signing of a new four-year deal to show exclusive live coverage of top flight English football, ITV begins showing a live game every Sunday afternoon.
- 1989
  - 9 January – Central launches a third sub-region – Central South. It covers Oxfordshire, Gloucestershire, Herefordshire and parts of Northamptonshire, Buckinghamshire and Wiltshire. These areas were previously served by the Central West sub-region.
  - 13 February – For the first time ITV starts broadcasting a national weather forecast. Previously each company had aired its own regional weather forecast which they had broadcast at the end of their local news programmes and at closedown.
  - 1 September – ITV introduces its first official on-air logo as part of an attempt to unify the network under one image whilst retaining regional identity.
  - TVTimes is sold to IPC Media.

== 1990s ==
- 1990
  - The roll-out of broadcasting ITV programmes in NICAM digital stereo begins and by the end of the year the majority of transmitters and their relays are broadcasting in stereo.
  - 27–28 May – ITV broadcasts its second Telethon.
  - 24 September – Yorkshire launches a third sub-regional opt-out for South Yorkshire and north Derbyshire.
- 1991
  - 1 January – The Independent Television Commission (ITC) replaces the IBA as the regulator of all non-BBC television broadcasting.
  - 3 March – Following the conclusion of the Gulf War, the ITN Early Morning News is halved in length and now goes on air at 5:30am. From this point, the ITN World News is no longer broadcast as part of the bulletin.
  - 3 October–2 November – ITV shows full live coverage of the 1991 Rugby World Cup, beginning a relationship with the tournament which lasts to this day.
  - 16 October – The (ITC) announces the results of the franchise round. Following the Broadcasting Act 1990, the ITC had to conduct a franchise auction whereby contracts would be given to the highest bidder, subject to fulfilling a programming ‘quality threshold.’ TSW lost the South West of England franchise to Westcountry Television, Thames Television controversially lost the London weekday franchise to Carlton Television, TVS lost the South of England franchise to Meridian Broadcasting, TV-am lost the national breakfast television franchise to Sunrise Television, which changed its name to GMTV before launch because of a dispute with British Sky Broadcasting over the name 'Sunrise', and ORACLE lost the National Teletext franchise to Teletext Ltd.
- 1992
  - 2 March – The News at 5.40 is renamed ITN Early Evening News.
  - 18 May – Sky outbids ITV for the live rights to the newly formed football Premier League. Sky bids £304 million, as opposed to ITV's £262 million. ITV subsequently purchases live rights to the newly formed UEFA Champions League and the second tier of English football, showing the latter on a regional basis until those rights passed to Sky in 1996.
  - June – Yorkshire and Tyne Tees television merge, beginning a process that would see the consolidation of ITV over the next decade.
  - 18–19 July – ITV broadcasts its third and final Telethon.
  - 1 November – The satellite TV channel UK Gold, run by the BBC with Thames Television, starts broadcasting. Thames gets involved with this service ahead of it losing its ITV franchise.
  - 17 December – Ahead of the loss of its franchise, the final edition of the Thames Television-produced current affairs series This Week is broadcast.
  - 31 December – Thames Television, TV-am, TVS, TSW and teletext service ORACLE all broadcast for the final time although Thames Television becomes an independent producer, producing for not just ITV, but also Channel 4, Sky and the BBC.
- 1993
  - 1 January – At the stroke of midnight, Carlton, Meridian and Westcountry all start broadcasting and at 6am GMTV goes on air for the first time. Also Teletext launches as ITV's new teletext service.
  - 28 June – The final ITV Schools broadcasts take place.
  - 6 September – CITV's afternoon slot is extended to start at 3:30 pm, when ITV network centre decided to move the pre-school children slot from 12:10 pm. Around the same time, the Children's ITV name is changed to CITV, having been used in some form or another since the previous year.
- 1994
  - Granada Television takes over LWT, Carlton Television acquires Central Independent Television and Meridian Broadcasting takes over Anglia Television.
- 1995
  - 13 December – Granada plc and BSkyB agree to create a joint venture to operate four services on Sky and cable platforms. This agreement represents the start of ITV's plans to create pay television channels.
- 1996
  - Carlton Television buys Westcountry Television and increased its stake in Central Independent Television to 81%.
  - 2 September – Carlton Food Network launches.
  - 1 October – Granada Sky Broadcasting, in conjunction with BSkyB, launches four channels – Granada Plus, Granada Good Life, Granada Men & Motors and Granada Talk TV
  - 1 November – A joint venture between Scottish Television and BSkyB results in the launch of Sky Scottish.
- 1997
  - More consolidation takes place. Granada Television acquires Yorkshire-Tyne Tees Television, Scottish Media Group (SMG), which owned Scottish Television, acquires Grampian Television and United News and Media, the owner of Meridian Broadcasting and Anglia Television, acquires HTV.
  - 31 January – Carlton Television, Granada Television and satellite company British Sky Broadcasting (BSkyB), create British Digital Broadcasting (BDB) as a joint venture and apply to operate three digital terrestrial television (DTT) licences.
  - 14 February – Carlton Select is launched. It had been on air since June 1995 as SelecTV, which was acquired by Carlton from Pearson Television.
  - March – ITV takes over as the broadcaster of Formula One motor racing. It shows full coverage of qualifying as well as the race itself, something that the previous rights holder, the BBC, generally did not do. ITV also obtains the FA Cup and England International football highlights rights from the BBC at around the same time, resulting in the return of the FA Cup to ITV screens for the first time since 1988.
  - 25 June – The ITC awards the sole DTT broadcast licence to British Digital Broadcasting – a consortium consisting of Carlton Television, Granada Television and BSkyB.
  - 31 August – Granada Talk TV stops broadcasting.
  - 20 December – The ITC awards three pay-TV digital multiplex licences to BDB.
- 1998
  - 14 January – ITV Nightscreen is shown for the first time.
  - 1 May – Granada Good Life is renamed Granada Breeze.
  - 31 May – Sky Scottish stops broadcasting.
  - 29 July – BDB rebrands as ONdigital after the ITC forced BSkyB out of the consortium on competition grounds, although Sky was still required to provide key channels such as Sky Movies and Sky Sports to ONdigital.
  - 15 November – The public launch of digital terrestrial TV in the UK takes place with the launch of OnDigital and as part of the 19-channel line-up, Carlton launches three new channels for the platform – Carlton Cinema, Carlton Kids and Carlton World, whilst Granada enters into a joint venture channel with Littlewoods to launch Shop!
  - 7 December –
    - ITV2 is launched, but only in England and Wales.
    - After 35 years on air, ITV's flagship current affairs programme World in Action is broadcast for the final time.
- 1999
  - 4 January – GMTV2 launches during the breakfast downtime of ITV2.
  - 8 March – Major changes to ITV's news programmes take place, including different times for the channel's news programmes and the programmes were referred to as ITV News rather than ITN News. The main bulletin of the day is now considered to be the Early Evening News and is moved from 5:40pm to 6:30pm and the evening news is controversially pushed back to 11pm although the following year the ITC forces ITV to move the late evening news back to 10pm on three nights each week. Also ITV's lunchtime news bulletin is relaunched as ITV Lunchtime News.
  - 8 April – The first edition of ITV's new current affairs series Tonight is broadcast. Seen as ITV's replacement for World in Action, the new programme adopts a lighter tone and focusses on UK human-interest-led stories.
  - 30 April – Scottish Television launches S2.
  - 28 June – Ulster Television launches TV You (later UTV2)
  - 6 September – Carlton Television drops the Central Independent Television and Westcountry Television names from their on-air presentation, rebranding these regions as Carlton Central and Carlton Westcountry respectively, and using the same on-air presentation for all three regions.
  - 8 November – A new, hearts-based on-air look is introduced.

== 2000s ==
- 2000
  - 31 January – Carlton Kids stops broadcasting.
  - 1 February – Carlton World stops broadcasting.
  - 1 March – Carlton Select stops broadcasting.
  - 1 May – ONrequest launches to provide pay-per-view content for OnDigital viewers.
  - 28 July - Granada acquires the United News & Media owned regions for £1.75 billion
  - 1 August – The ITN News Channel goes on the air.
  - September – Following ONdigital purchasing the rights to the ATP Masters Series tennis, ONsport launches, replacing Champions on 28 and Champions on 99, which had reflected the channel numbers they were broadcast on. The channels are rebranded respectively as ONsport 1 and ONsport 2. Whilst ONsport 1 broadcasts full-time, ONsport 2 timeshares with Carlton Cinema and is only on air to provide coverage of an alternate Champions League match.
  - 24 October - Carlton Television buys HTV from Granada.
- 2001
  - 22 January – ITV reinstates ITV News at Ten. The bulletin airs on three nights of the week. Friday nights sees the late news kept at 11pm and named ITV Weekend News. On one other night of the week, the News at Ten could be moved to accommodate movies or sporting events. For the first few months, the late regional news was maintained before being moved from 10.30pm to 10.20pm to create a half hour block of news. The reversal comes after the Independent Television Commission forced ITV to move the late evening news back to 10pm on three nights each week.
  - May – Following the signing of a joint venture with supermarket chain Sainsbury's, Carlton Food Network is renamed Taste CFN.
  - July – Granada buys Border Television.
  - 11 July – Carlton and Granada relaunch OnDigital as ITV Digital in an attempt to better compete with Sky.
  - 11 July – ITV relaunches OnDigital as ITV Digital in an attempt to better compete with Sky.
  - 27 July – S2 closes and consequently ITV2 starts broadcasting in Scotland.
  - 1 August - Granada buys Border Television, it would the final ITV consolidation before Granada & Carlton merged 3 years later.
  - 11 August –
    - The ITV Sport Channel launches. It replaces ONsport and is a premium service rather than an add-on for ITV Digital customers.
    - ITV is renamed ITV1 in all ITV plc-owned regions.
  - 1 December – Taste CFN stops broadcasting.
- 2002
  - 22 January – UTV2 stops broadcasting. Consequently, ITV2 launches in Northern Ireland.
  - 27 March – ITV Digital goes into administration.
  - 23 April – ITV Select, launched originally as ONrequest, closes.
  - 30 April – Granada Breeze stops broadcasting.
  - 1 May – ITV Digital stops broadcasting.
  - 12 May – Following the collapse of ITV Digital, the ITV Sports Channel stops broadcasting.
  - 30 September – ITV purchases ITN's 65% stake in its news channel and relaunches it as the ITV News Channel.
  - 16 October - Granada and Carlton announce their intention to merge.
  - 28 October – A new look on-air presentation is launched, On-air regional identities are dropped in most regions apart from when introducing regional programmes.
- 2003
  - 31 March – Carlton Cinema stops broadcasting.
  - 7 October - Granada and Carlton finally agree to merge.
  - 29 December – Ofcom replaces the ITC as the regulator of all non-BBC television broadcasting.
- 2004
  - 2 February –
    - Carlton and Granada successfully completes their merger to create a single England and Wales ITV company called ITV plc.
    - After several years of inconsistent scheduling of the late evening news, the bulletin moves to a five nights a week 10:30pm start time.
  - April – The newly created ITV plc purchases NTL's 35% stake in the ITV News Channel.
  - 31 October – Regional logos are seen on ITV for the final time.
  - 1 November – ITV3 launches, replacing Plus which closes a few hours prior to ITV3's launch. Earlier that day ITV bought out BSkyB's stake in Granada Sky Broadcasting.
- 2005
  - 11 April – The ITV Lunchtime News is extended to last 60 minutes.
  - 1 November – ITV4 launches, but only as a part-time channel.
  - 23 December – ITV News Channel stops broadcasting at 6pm. Poor ratings in comparison to BBC News 24 and Sky News, and ITV's desire to reuse the channel's allocation on Freeview, were cited as the reasons.
- 2006
  - 11 March – CITV Channel launches on Freeview, Home Choice and Telewest. It starts broadcasting on Sky on 8 May and on NTL on 6 June.
  - 19 April – ITV Play launches.
  - 30 May – STV launches across Scotland replacing the previously separate services of Scottish and Grampian.
  - June – ITV launches a trial high-definition channel, primarily to show matches from the 2006 FIFA World Cup.
  - 4 September – The ITV Lunchtime News reverts to being a 30-minute programme and its start time is moved back to 1:30pm.
  - 30 October – ITV2, and ITV3 launch +1 channels.
  - 30 November – The ITV HD trial broadcast ends.
  - 4 December – The non-franchised region ITV Thames Valley is launched. It incorporates the former Central South news service and the Meridian North service and both operate as their own sub-regions for non-news programming and for advertising.
  - 13 December – The Berwick-upon-Tweed transmitter transfers from Border to Tyne Tees as part of the preparations for the digital switchover of the Border region in 2008.
  - 22 December – CITV ends on ITV1 after 23 years on air. Earlier in 2006 ITV had closed down its in-house children's production unit.
- 2007
  - 8 January – The Calendar East and Calendar South regions are merged to form a new Calendar South region covering central and east Lincolnshire, east and south east Yorkshire, east Nottinghamshire and north Norfolk. The Calendar North region, broadcasting from the Emley Moor transmitter continues as before.
  - 5 March – ITV announces that all premium rate phone competitions and quizzes will be suspended while an audit takes place after a number of problems with premium rate services affecting ITV, BBC One and Channel 4 come to light. Consequently, participation channel ITV Play is suspended.
  - 13 March – ITV announces that ITV Play will permanently close down following the recent concerns over participation television. On 16 March, its slot on Freeview is taken by the recently launched ITV2+1.
  - September – Major cost-cutting plans were announced which would see massive cutbacks to regional programming, including the reduction of regional news programmes from seventeen to nine. The changes took effect in February 2009.
- 2008
  - 14 January – ITV News at Ten returns to the schedules on four nights each week – the Friday edition remains at 11pm.
  - 5 February – ITV4 becomes a 24-hour channel.
  - 17 July – ITV HD launches as a full-time service. A trial broadcast had taken place during summer 2006.
  - 1 December – ITV4 +1 launches.
  - December – All non-news regional programming in England ends after Ofcom gives ITV permission to drastically cut back its regional programming. From 2009 the only regional programme is the monthly political discussion show.
- 2009
  - February – ITV implements the major cutbacks to its regional news broadcasts in England. The separate sub-regional news programmes are merged into pan-regional programmes although more localised news continues to be broadcast as a brief opt-out during the early evening programme.
  - 25 November – ITV takes full control of GMTV.
  - 15 December – With the exception of its travel and holiday sections, ITVs teletext service stops broadcasting on analogue TV. It had ended on Sky Digital the previous day. This puts Teletext Ltd in breach of its licence to broadcast. Ofcom later revokes Teletext's licence and imposes a fine.

== 2010s ==
- 2010
  - 1 April – Men & Motors stops broadcasting.
  - 21 June – ITV's teletext service stops broadcasting altogether when it is removed from Freeview.
  - 31 August – After more than 25 years on air, the final episode of The Bill is shown.
  - 3 September – The final edition of GMTV is broadcast.
  - 6 September – The first edition of Daybreak is broadcast.
  - 7 October – ITV2 HD launches.
  - 15 November – ITV3 HD and ITV4 HD launch.
- 2011
  - 11 January – ITV +1 (as well as STV +1 and UTV +1) is launched.
  - 23 November – ITV plc completes its purchase of Channel Television.
  - 14 November – ITV, with JML Direct, launch home shopping channel The Zone.
- 2012
  - 21 December – The final edition of ITV's early morning news programme ITV News at 5:30 is broadcast. Consequently, there is no longer any overnight news coverage on ITV.
- 2013
  - 14 January – After more than 11 years, the ITV1 brand is dropped in all ITV plc-owned regions and the main channel is known once again as ITV. ITV News introduces a new look.
  - 16 September – Sub-regional news coverage is reintroduced across England. The weekday daytime, late evening and weekend bulletins as well as 20 minutes of the 6pm programme are once again more localised.
  - 1 October – The Zone becomes The Store.
- 2014
  - 6 January – Following instructions from regulator Ofcom, ITV reopens Border’s sub-regional service for southern Scotland.
  - 25 April – The final edition of Daybreak is broadcast.
  - 28 April – The first edition of Good Morning Britain is broadcast.
  - 2 June – STV launches the first of its local television channels – STV Glasgow.
  - 9 June – ITV Encore launches.
  - 8 October – ITVBe launches.
- 2015
  - 1 January – UTV Ireland launches in the Republic of Ireland.
  - 12 January – STV launches its second local television channel STV Edinburgh.
  - March – STV is awarded three more local licences, to cover Aberdeen, Ayr and Dundee.
- 2016
  - 21 February – CITV's broadcast hours are extended into the early evening with programmes continuing until 21:00 rather than 18:00.
  - 29 March – ITV buys UTV.
  - 17 October – UTV is rebranded to match ITV's current look.
- 2017
  - 1 January –
    - ITV takes over from Channel 4 as the exclusive terrestrial broadcaster of horse racing. This is the first time since 1988 that the sport had been shown on ITV.
    - UTV Ireland closes and is replaced by be3.
  - 4 February – Following ITV's return to covering live boxing, the channel launches a pay-per-view channel ITV Box Office.
  - 21 February – ITV announces plans to redevelop its headquarters at The London Studios.
  - 24 April – STV merges its local channels and relaunches them as a single channel called STV2.
- 2018
  - 16 April – ITV moves production of its breakfast and daytime programming from The London Studios to the former BBC Television Centre at White City.
  - 1 May – ITV Encore closes as a linear channel after four years on air. It continues as an on-demand service.
  - 30 June – STV2 stops broadcasting following That's TV's acquisition of the assets of STV's STV2 channel.
  - 9 October – ITV announces plans to sell The London Studios and abandon the five-year redevelopment programme for the building that was unveiled in February 2017.
- 2019
  - 1 January – ITV introduces its first rebrand since 2013. Called ITV Creates, the new ident is an artist-led set of idents which will feature idents from a different artist each week of the year.
  - January – The Store closes.
  - 15 May – ITV cancels The Jeremy Kyle Show, following the death of a guest.

== 2020s ==
- 2020
  - 6 January – ITV extends its breakfast programming to 10am on weekdays, thereby removing the historic 9.25am demarcation between breakfast and daytime programming that had existed since breakfast television launched on ITV in 1983. The change also sees Good Morning Britain and This Morning both extended by 30 minutes with Good Morning Britain ending at nine o'clock and with This Morning starting at 10 o'clock.
  - 24 January – ITV announces that it has closed its pay-per-view service ITV Box Office.
  - 2 April – UTV begins broadcasting full ITV branding and presentation from London including network announcements, idents, promos and end credit sequences, initially as a temporary measure due to the impact of the COVID-19 pandemic on staff at the Belfast studios. This became officially permanent in November with the departures of the announcing team from the station.
  - 29 July – Merit launches as an evening service showing gardening and cookery programmes but less than a month after its launch, ITV sells the channel to Sky Group.
  - 26 November – Local continuity is officially abandoned with the departures of the announcing team in Northern Ireland.
- 2021
  - March – ITV announces that from April it will close some SD regional services on satellite.
  - 9 April – Following the announcement of the death of Prince Philip, ITV cancels its scheduled programming for the remainder of the day to air ongoing news coverage. Overnight figures indicate its audience share to be 60% lower when compared to the same day the previous week.
  - 1 October – ITV Nightscreen is broadcast for the final time, ending after nearly 24 years. It is replaced the following night by Unwind with ITV/Unwind with STV.
- 2022
  - 7 March – ITV launches a revised early evening schedule which sees the ITV Evening News at 6.30pm extended from 30 to 60 minutes. Emmerdale moves from 7pm to 7.30pm on weeknights, while Coronation Street moves from six 30 minute episodes to three 60 minute episodes airing on Mondays, Wednesdays and Fridays at 8pm rather than 7.30pm and 8.30pm on those days.
  - 1 November – The encryption is removed from the HD variants of ITV2, ITV3 and ITV4. Consequently, the channels start broadcasting as free-to-air services.
  - 15 November – ITV reverts its flagship channel's name back to ITV1 in all ITV plc-owned regions and their other channels (excluding CITV) get a refresh to coincide with the upcoming launch ITV's new streaming service ITVX, which launched on 17 November.
- 2023
  - 3 July – Home shopping channel Ideal World is dropped by ITV as the channel itself starts to find a buyer. The slot, which had run from just after midnight until 3am, is filled with alternative programming such as Bling and repeats of Winning Combination.
  - 1 September – The CITV channel closes, with programming moving to ITVX. A morning block of children's programming launches the following day on ITV2, using the "CITV" brand.
  - 12 December - The remaining regions of ITV1 (Border Scotland and Channel Television) and ITVBe begin broadcasting in HD on satellite.
- 2024
  - January – ITV begins operating a pop-up rolling news channel to provide breaking news coverage during major events.
  - 9 January - The SD versions of ITV3, ITV4 (except +1) and ITVBe close on satellite.
- 2025
  - 9 June – ITVBe closes, with ITV Quiz taking its channel slot. Many of its programmes, which had mostly been reality shows, move back to ITV2.
- 2026
  - 5 January – ITV relaunches its weekday programming output. Good Morning Britain is extended to run until 9.30am or 10am, Lorraine and Loose Women will now only air at certain items of the year, and a new soap hour is introduced.
  - 10 April – The CITV brand airs on a linear channel for the final time when the last CITV block is aired on ITV2.

== See also ==
- History of ITV
- History of ITV television idents
- Timelines of:
  - ABC
  - Anglia
  - ATV
  - Border
  - Carlton
  - Central
  - Channel
  - Grampian
  - Granada
  - HTV West
  - ITV in Wales
  - LWT
  - Meridian
  - STV
  - Southern
  - Thames & Associated-Rediffusion
  - TSW & Westward
  - TV-am
  - TVS
  - Tyne Tees
  - UTV
  - Westcountry
  - Yorkshire
- Timelines of:
  - ITV children's TV
  - ITV Digital Channels
  - ITV News
  - ITN
  - ITV regional news
  - ITV Sport
