= Timeline of TSW =

This is a timeline of the history of the British broadcaster Television South West (TSW) and its predecessor Westward Television. Between them, they provided the ITV service for the South West of England from 1961 to 1992.

== Westward ==
- 1961
  - 29 April – Westward Television starts broadcasting. Westward had fought off 11 competing bids to win the licence to broadcast to south west England.
- 1962
  - No events.
- 1963
  - No events.
- 1964
  - Westward is given a three-year extension to its licence. This is later extended by a further year.
- 1965
  - No events.
- 1966
  - No events.
- 1967
  - The Independent Television Authority renews Westward's licence for a further seven years.
- 1968
  - 22 April – The Huntshaw Cross transmitting station opens, providing better reception across north Devon.
  - August – A technicians strike forces ITV off the air for several weeks although management manage to launch a temporary ITV Emergency National Service with no regional variations.
  - September – The final edition of Westward's listings magazine Look Westward is published. Listings are subsequently carried in a Westward edition of TVTimes which now becomes a national publication.
- 1969
  - 17 January – Westward merges with the Keith Prowse company, due to Westward's chairman Peter Cadbury also being chairman of Keith Prowse.
  - Later in 1969 – EMI purchases Keith Prowse Music Publishing from Westward.
- 1970
  - January – Peter Cadbury is sacked, and rehired within days as the chairman of the Westward board, after he made outspoken remarks against the levy imposed on advertising revenue imposed by the IBA.
- 1971
  - 22 May — Westward Television starts broadcasting in colour from the Redruth transmitter.
  - 13 September – Westward begins broadcasting in colour from the Stockland Hill and Caradon Hill transmitters, and to mark the change, Westward's ident is reshot in colour.
- 1972
  - 16 October – Following a law change which removed all restrictions on broadcasting hours, ITV is able to launch an afternoon service.
- 1973
  - 5 November – Colour transmissions begin from the Huntshaw Cross transmitter.
- 1974
  - The 1974 franchise round sees no changes in ITV's contractors as it is felt that the huge cost in switching to colour television would have made the companies unable to compete against rivals in a franchise battle.
- 1975
  - No events.
- 1976
  - No events.
- 1977
  - No events.
- 1978
  - No events.
- 1979
  - 10 August – The ten week ITV strike forces Westward Television off the air. The strike ends on 24 October although Westward staff returned to work a few days before the rest of the country.
- 1980
  - 28 December – The Independent Broadcasting Authority announces that Westward has lost its franchise to TSW.
- 1981
  - Early in 1981 – Rather than waiting until after its franchise ends, Westward's management decide to sell up quickly to TSW which purchases Westward Television for £2.38 million.
  - 12 August – TSW goes on air in all but name, continuing to use the Westward name until the end of the year.
  - 31 December – At just before midnight, Westward Television says goodbye rather than at the end of the day's programmes as the other companies that lost their franchises did.

== TSW ==
- 1982
  - 1 January – TSW launches at midnight and closes down for the night 40 minutes later with TSW branding.
- 1983
  - TSW concludes a two-year £4 million investment programme in its studios which sees the introduction of new production equipment and the building of an additional studio.
- 1984
  - No events.
- 1985
  - 3 January – TSW's last day of transmission using the 405-lines system.
  - May – TSW unveils a computerised version of its ident.
- 1986
  - Channel Television switches its feed of the ITV network from TSW to TVS.
- 1987
  - 7 September – Following the transfer of ITV Schools to Channel 4, ITV provides a full morning programme schedule, with advertising, for the first time. The new service includes regular five-minute national and regional news bulletins.
  - TSW changes the name of its regional news programme from Today South West to Today.
- 1988
  - 2 September – TSW begins 24-hour broadcasting.
- 1989
  - TSW renames its news programme from Today to TSW Today.
  - Autumn – TSW chooses to refresh its on-screen presentation rather than use the 1989 ITV corporate look.
- 1990
  - TSW becomes one of the first ITV companies to start broadcasting in NICAM digital stereo.
- 1991
  - 16 October – The ITC announces that TSW has lost its licence, to Westcountry Television. Westcountry had tabled a lower bid but the ITC awarded the licence to Westcountry because it felt that TSW's bid of £16.1 million was too high. Westcountry was the second highest of the other two applicants and was awarded the licence with a bid of £7.82 million.
- 1992
  - February – TSW's appeal to have the ITC's decision to relieve TSW of its licence fails when it is rejected by the House of Lords.
  - 31 December – At just before midnight, TSW stops broadcasting as after the chimes of Big Ben, the new licensee, Westcountry takes over as franchise holder for south west England.
- After 1992
  - TSW undertakes a reverse takeover with the White Ward Group, makers of safety footwear and associated articles. The name of the company is changed to UK Safety Ltd and trades for a number of years, before entering administrative receivership.
  - The directors of TSW create the TSW Film and Television Archive, one of the first and largest of what has now become a network of regional film archives. It was later renamed the South West Film and Television Archive (SWFTA) and it holds the entire surviving back catalogue of both Westward and TSW programmes

== See also ==
- History of ITV
- History of ITV television idents
- Timeline of ITV
- Timeline of Westcountry Television – TSW's successor
