= Timeline of Channel Television =

This is a timeline of the history of the British broadcaster Channel Television (now known as ITV Channel Television). It provides the ITV service for the Channel Islands.

== 1960s ==
- 1960
  - Channel Television is awarded the contract to provide ITV television in the Channel Islands. However, the Independent Television Authority pointed out that the Television Act 1954 that established ITV did not include provision for the Channel Islands and as a result, if the ITA was to operate an ITV service there, it would have to be permitted by means of extending the Act to the islands with an Order in Council.
- 1961
  - September – Channel gets permission to install a microwave relay station on the northern island of Alderney that would connect with another ITV station, initially Westward Television.
- 1962
  - 1 September – Channel Television begins broadcasting.
- 1963
  - 3 March – Channel launches a children's series called Puffin's Pla(i)ce. It is broadcast each week for the next 50 years, until it was moved online in 2013.
- 1964
  - Channel is given a three-year extension to its licence. This is later extended by a further year.
- 1965
  - No events.
- 1966
  - No events.
- 1967
  - The Independent Television Authority renews Channel's licence for a further seven years.
- 1968
  - 2 August – A technicians strike forces ITV off the air for several weeks although management manage to launch a temporary ITV Emergency National Service with no regional variations.
- 1969
  - No events.

== 1970s ==
- 1970
  - Channel formalises its relationship with Westward Television allowing a greater share of programming between the two franchise holders.
- 1971
  - Channel enables a microwave link between Guernsey and Channel's headquarters on Jersey. This means that live studio contributions from the island to be broadcast for the first time.
  - Channel's listings magazine Channel Viewer is closed and is replaced by a localised version of TVTimes.
- 1972
  - 16 October – Following a law change which removed all restrictions on broadcasting hours, ITV is able to launch an afternoon service. Channel does launch an afternoon service but it continues to restrict its broadcasting hours and it isn't until the middle of the 1980s that Channel broadcasts all day, every day.
- 1973
  - 17 December – The British government imposes early close downs on BBC1, BBC2 and ITV in order to save electricity during the Three-Day Week crisis. This meant Channel Television would have to end its broadcast day at around 10:30pm. The restrictions were lifted from Christmas Eve 1973 until 6 January 1974, allowing people to enjoy the festive season programmes. The restrictions returned on Monday 7 January 1974.
- 1974
  - 8 February – The required early close downs of all UK television channels is lifted. Channel had been badly affected by the restrictions due to the loss of advertising revenue caused by the early closedowns.
  - The 1974 franchise round sees no changes in ITV's contractors as it is felt that the huge cost in switching to colour television would have made the companies unable to compete against rivals in a franchise battle.
- 1975
  - No events.
- 1976
  - 5 January – Channel Report is broadcast for the first time. The name continues to be used until 2013.
  - 26 July – Channel begins broadcasting in colour, seven years after colour first started to be broadcast elsewhere in the UK. Delays were due to the cost of upgrading the studios and purchasing new equipment and due to the technical difficulties in providing a UHF link from the UK mainland to the Channel Islands.
- 1977
  - All local programming is now made in colour.
- 1978
  - No events.
- 1979
  - Channel becomes the first ITV region to introduce electronic news-gathering (ENG) to its local news operation.
  - August to October – Channel is the only ITV region to continue to broadcast during the ten-week ITV strike because the unions realised action there could force the station out of business as its audience was so small it was vulnerable to any loss of advertising revenue, which would therefore act against the interests of a trade union's purpose of maintaining employment for its members. Channel provided a service based mainly on films, imports, extended local news coverage and regional programming.

== 1980s ==
- 1980
  - No events.
- 1981
  - October – Channel launches a local service for the Oracle teletext service.
- 1982
  - 1 January – TSW replaces Westward Television as the franchise holder for south west England and Channel receives its feed of the ITV network from the new licensee.
- 1983
  - 1 February – ITV's national breakfast television service launches. However, Channel continues not to broadcast during the morning when ITV Schools is not on air, resulting in a closedown period between the end of TV-am's programming and the start of Channel's broadcasts at around lunchtime.
  - Channel's Guernsey base moves to larger facilities at St George's Esplanade.
- 1984
  - No events.
- 1985
  - 3 January – Channel's last day of transmission using the 405-lines system.
- 1986
  - Channel Television switches its feed of the ITV network from TSW to TVS.
- 1987
  - 7 September – Following the transfer of ITV Schools to Channel 4, ITV provides a full morning programme schedule, with advertising, for the first time. By 1987, Channel had finally started to broadcast programmes on weekday mornings throughout the year and therefore broadcasts the new programmes.
- 1988
  - March – Channel starts simulcasting TVS's late-night programming slot Late Night Late, thereby keeping Channel on air until 3am during the week and 4am at the weekend.
  - 30 May – To co-inside with TVS launching a full 24-hour service, Channel also begins 24-hour broadcasting.
  - Channel moves into larger facilities at La Pouquelaye, converted from the former offices of Rediffusion's Jersey operation.
- 1989
  - 1 September – ITV introduces its first official logo as part of an attempt to unify the network under one image whilst retaining regional identity. Channel does not adopt the logo, instead launching a computerised version of the logo it has been using since 1982.

== 1990s ==
- 1990
  - No events.
- 1991
  - 16 October – Channel retains its licence to broadcast when it bids the lowest amount allowed - £1,000. There had been a rival application, CI3 Group, formed in part by former Channel TV employees, which had tabled a higher bid, but it was dismissed due to it failing the quality threshold test.
  - 19 October – The final edition of CTV Times is published. It had remained on sale long after the other ITV regions had replaced their listings magazine with the TVTimes as it was feared that the company might cease trading without the revenue from its own magazine.
- 1992
  - No events.
- 1993
  - Channel refreshes its on-screen logo.
- 1994
  - No events.
- 1995
  - No events.
- 1996
  - Channel launches a subtitling service for its local programmes.
- 1997
  - Channel moves its Guernsey base to St. Sampson, including a small multi-camera studio.
- 1998
  - Channel launches a new onscreen ident but retains its current logo on endcaps.
- 1999
  - 1 June – Channel launches a brand new ident.

== 2000s ==
- 2000
  - No events.
- 2001
  - Channel Television is bought by the Yattendon Investment Trust, although the buy-out did not lead to a noticeable change on screen.
- 2002
  - 28 October – ITV's 2002 celebrity ident package is launched and Channel begins using a variation of this look whereby the left side of the screen is taken up by its logo. A number of idents are used featuring different celebrities and some local ones made by Channel themselves are also used. The change also sees ending of the use of an on-screen clock - Channel had been one of the last regions to stop using an on-screen clock.
- 2003
  - No events.
- 2004
  - January – The final two remaining English ITV companies, Carlton and Granada, merge to create a single England and Wales ITV company called ITV plc. However, Channel remains separate from the newly formed ITV plc.
  - 1 November – Channel used idents of scenes from around the Channel Islands, with the logo in a stripe down the left side of the screen. Some elements of the network branding were also used.
- 2005
  - No events.
- 2006
  - 16 January – Channel adopts the ITV1 logo but shows a localised version of the national ident.
- 2007
  - No events.
- 2008
  - No events.
- 2009
  - No events.

== 2010s and 2020s ==
- 2010
  - 17 November – The Channel Islands completes digital switchover.
- 2011
  - 23 November – ITV plc buys Channel Television from the Yattendon Group.
- 2012
  - No events.
- 2013
  - 14 January – Following ITV's 2013 rebrand, Channel's presentation is brought into line with the other ITV regions. The rebrand also sees the name of Channel's news service change from Channel Report to ITV News Channel TV.
  - 15 September – After 50 years on air, children's programme Puffin's Pla(i)ce is broadcast for the final time, although it continued to be shown on Channel's website for a short time.
- 2014
  - No events.
- 2015
  - June – Channel moves to its current, smaller premises at Castle Quay.
- 2016
  - No events.
- 2017
  - March – Channel's licence is transferred to ITV Broadcasting Limited.
- 2018 to 2022
  - No events.
- 2023
  - 12 December – ITV1 Channel Television begins broadcasting in HD on Freesat and Sky.

== See also ==
- History of ITV
- History of ITV television idents
- Timeline of ITV
