= Timeline of TVS =

This is a timeline of the history of the former British broadcaster TVS. It provided the ITV service for the South and South East of England from 1982 to 1992.

== 1980s ==
=== 1980 ===
- 28 December – The Independent Broadcasting Authority announces that Television South (TVS) has been awarded the franchise to broadcast to South and South East England. TVS will replace Southern Television at the start of programming on 1 January 1982.

=== 1981 ===
- August – TVS purchases Southern's studios, but the incumbent continues to use them until their franchise runs out at the end of the year, forcing TVS to operate out of portakabins located in the car park.

=== 1982 ===
- 1 January
  - TVS launches at 9:30am.
  - At 5:15pm, TVS broadcasts the first main edition of their new regional news magazine Coast to Coast. At first, the programme airs between 5:30 and 6:30pm, consisting of two sub-regional segments at 5:30 and 6:20pm, ITN's News at 5:45 and a pan-regional segment at 6pm.
- Spring – The main evening edition of Coast to Coast is cut to a single 30-minute programme, beginning at 6pm, the change also sees the launch of fully separate editions for the South and South East.
- Autumn – TVS opens The Maidstone Studios.

=== 1983 ===
- 1 February – ITV's breakfast television service TV-am launches. Consequently, TVS's broadcast day begins at 9:25am.
- Following the opening of their new studios at Maidstone, TVS closes the studios in Dover which they had used as a news-gathering base for the South East area which had previously been used by their predecessor, Southern. The studios are demolished the following year.

=== 1984 ===
- 12 April – Whitbread acquires a 20% stake in TVS from European ferries, as the latter wishes to concentrate their financial and management resources on the shipping and property sectors.
- 17 August – Greg Dyke, formerly of TV-am, is appointed as Director of Programmes at TVS. In a bid to rejuvenate the station, he starts to move programming away from their original philosophy of niche arts and science programming, and TVS begins producing more entertainment programmes.

=== 1985 ===
- 3 January – The last day of transmission on TVS using the 405-lines system.
- TVS comes to an agreement with LWT to help fill their schedules with domestically-produced programming while not having to increase their budget, this helps TVS to get more of their programmes onto the ITV network.

=== 1986 ===
- Channel Television switches its feed of the ITV network from Television South West (TSW) to TVS.
- TVS is heavily criticised by the IBA over their programming, the criticism mainly concerns the Southampton editions of Coast to Coast while issues are raised over the quality of their drama and light entertainment output. Their education series are also deemed 'too didactic', and their religious output is branded as having 'barely discernible religious content'. Dyke accepts the IBA criticism, but highlights that TVS had already begun remedying the issues and faults, with a new editor for their Southampton news operation, with a new head of religious output being brought in, along with a Controller of Drama - a first for TVS. Once again, TVS expresses concerns about their relationship with the "Big Five" ITV stations, and how they control the channel's output.
- November – Whitbread sells their 20% stake in TVS.
- TVS starts to branch out into other areas, by purchasing Midem, an organisation that promotes trade fairs, and Gilson International, a Los Angeles distribution company selling programmes outside the US. TVS also acquires a 3.5% stake in Australia Network Ten company Northern Star.

=== 1987 ===
- 10 April – Greg Dyke leaves TVS and returns to LWT.
- 7 September
  - Following the transfer of ITV Schools to Channel 4, ITV provides a full morning programme schedule, with advertising, for the first time, the new service includes regular five-minute national and regional news bulletins.
  - To mark the occasion, TVS launches a new look to its presentation.

=== 1988 ===
- 25 January – TVS launches Late Night Late and gradually extends its broadcast hours over the next few months.
- 30 May – TVS begins 24-hour broadcasting.
- 1 July – TVS buys American media company MTM Enterprises.
- 12 December – TVS launches a new sub-region, providing viewers in Berkshire and north Hampshire, who are served by the Hannington transmitting station, with a more localised news service as an opt-out from regional news magazine Coast to Coast.
- TVS sells their Television Theatre in Gillingham, Kent, this had originally been purchased as a stop-gap measure for their South East service, prior to the completion of The Maidstone Studios.

=== 1989 ===
- 1 September – On the day that ITV launches a major new corporate look, TVS chooses to refresh their own presentation, rather than using the TVS version of the new generic ITV ident.
- 20–24 November – TVS pilots a 30-minute late night edition of Coast to Coast, called Coast to Coast Late, the pilot runs for a single week and is not taken up.
- Following a reorganisation, TVS formally changes its company name from 'Television South plc' to 'TVS Entertainment plc', with UK broadcasting activities undertaken by subsidiary 'TVS Television Ltd'.

== 1990s ==
=== 1990 ===
- No events.

=== 1991 ===
- August – TVS closes its overnight service Late Night Late and starts simulcasting the overnight service provided by Thames and LWT.
- 16 October – The Independent Television Commission (ITC) announces that TVS has lost its licence, losing out to Meridian Broadcasting. They had tabled a lower bid than TVS but the ITC had felt that TVS’s bid of £59 million was too high. Meridian Broadcasting was the highest of the other three applicants, and was awarded the licence with a bid of £36 million per year.
- 17 December – TVS sells its studio facilities at Southampton to the incoming franchisee Meridian Broadcasting.

=== 1992 ===
- 31 December – At 11:59pm, TVS stops broadcasting after the chimes of Big Ben as the new licensee, Meridian Broadcasting takes over as the franchise holder for South and South East England.

=== 1993 ===
- 1 February – International Family Entertainment Inc. purchases TVS and uses its archives to help launch The Family Channel on 1 September 1993, which would then relaunch as Challenge TV on 3 February 1997.

== See also ==
- History of ITV
- History of ITV television idents
- Timeline of ITV
- Timeline of Southern Television – TVS's predecessor
- Timeline of Meridian Broadcasting – TVS's successor
