= Timeline of Central Independent Television =

This is a timeline of the history of the British broadcaster Central Independent Television (now known as ITV Central). It has provided the ITV service for the Midlands since 1982.

== 1980s ==
- 1980
  - 28 December – The Independent Broadcasting Authority announces the new contractors to commence on 1 January 1982. Midlands licensee Associated TeleVision Ltd. (ATV) is allowed to retain its licence on the condition that 49% of the company is owned locally. Another condition is that the company is renamed to demonstrate that it is effectively a new business.
- 1981
  - Central Independent Television is the name chosen for the new dual-region Midlands franchise.
- 1982
  - 1 January – At 9:25am, Central Independent Television goes on the air.
- 1983
  - 1 February – ITV's breakfast television service TV-am launches. Consequently, Central's broadcast day now begins at 9:25am.
  - 7 May – ATV (now Associated Communications Corp.) sells its stake in Central and Sears Holdings purchases a 20% stake while Ladbrokes and DC Thomson also increase their stakes to 20% each and Pergamon takes its ownership to 12.5% with 27.5% being held by single stakeholders.
  - July – Central uses ATV Elstree Studios for the final time. It does so in order to comply with a condition of the licence renewal which requires the company to stop using any London-centric facilities.
  - September
    - Central's Nottingham studios begin operating and they are officially opened by Prince Philip, Duke of Edinburgh on 2 February 1984.
    - Central finally launches its East Midlands service. An industrial dispute was the reason why the new service had been delayed by more than 18 months.
- 1984
  - The Elstree Studios are sold to the BBC.
  - Central establishes a subsidiary company Zenith Productions to produce programming for the UK and the USA.
- 1985
  - 3 January – Central's last day of transmission using the 405-lines system.
  - 25 August – A new presentation package is launched at 9:25am. The sphere is replaced by a ‘cake’.
- 1986
  - 17 January – The first edition of Friday night debate programme Central Weekend is broadcast. The 90-minute programme (presented by Roger Cook, Andy Craig & Sue Jay) proves to be popular, quickly establishing a 40% audience share.
  - 2 April – Central becomes the first ITV company to broadcast in-vision teletext when it launches a Jobfinder service, which broadcasts for one hour after the end of the day's programming.
- 1987
  - 6 January
    - Central acquires the European division of the American production company Filmfair for £1.5million. Filmfair goes on to produce several of the station's networked children's series before being sold onto the Storm Group (Caspian) in 1991.
    - Central acquires a 22% stake in Starstream, which operates The Children's Channel.
  - 16 March – Carlton Communications acquires 20 per cent of Central from Ladbrokes for £30 million.
  - 25 April – Central becomes the first station in the UK to keep its transmitters on air all night when it launches More Central. Programmes are shown until around 3am on weekdays and 4am at the weekend, with the rest of the night filled by its Jobfinder service.
  - 22 July – Central's investigative series The Cook Report makes its debut on ITV.
  - 7 September – Following the transfer of ITV Schools to Channel 4, ITV provides a full morning programme schedule, with advertising, for the first time. The new service includes regular five-minute national and regional news bulletins.
- 1988
  - 13 February – Central launches a full 24-hour service.
  - 4 April – After nearly 24 years on air, the final episode of Crossroads is broadcast. Central had taken over production of the programme from ATV. It would be revived in 2001 and would end again in 2003.
- 1989
  - 9 January – Central launches a third sub-region – Central South. It covers Oxfordshire, Gloucestershire, Herefordshire and parts of Northamptonshire, Buckinghamshire and Wiltshire. These areas were previously served by the Central West sub-region.
  - 1 September – ITV introduces its first official logo as part of an attempt to unify the network under one image whilst retaining regional identity. Central adopts its version of the ident.

== 1990s ==
- 1990
  - 4 March – Central forms a partnership with The Observer newspaper to create Central Observer, making environmental themed films for British Satellite Broadcasting and terrestrial channels, with funding from the charity Television Trust for the Environment.
- 1991
  - 16 October – The Independent Television Commission announces the results of the franchise round. Central is unopposed for the Midlands licence and retains it with a token bid of only £2,000 per year, plus 11% of their annual advertising revenue.
  - November
    - Having previously rented its Birmingham studio complex, Central now owns these studios.
    - Central sells its stake in Starstream to United Artists Cable International.
- 1992
  - No events.
- 1993
  - No events.
- 1994
  - January – Carlton Communications takes full ownership of Central.
- 1995
  - February – Central ends its own night-time programming and carries the London overnight service although opt-outs for Jobfinder and other regional programming continues.
- 1996
  - No events.
- 1997
  - June – Central moves its Birmingham headquarters from the former Central House complex at Broad Street to a smaller building at Central Court on Gas Street.
- 1998
  - 15 November – The public launch of digital terrestrial TV in the UK takes place.
- 1999
  - 8 March – Central News' main teatime programme is renamed Central News at Six to coincide with the programme being rescheduled from 6:25pm to 6pm.
  - 6 September – Carlton Television drops the Central name and rebrands the region as Carlton Central.

== 2000s ==
- 2000
  - No events.
- 2001
  - 11 August – ITV's main channel is rebranded as ITV1.
  - 7 September – After more than 15 years, the final edition of Central Weekend is broadcast.
- 2002
  - 28 October – On-air regional identities are dropped apart from when introducing regional programmes and Carlton Central is renamed ITV1 Carlton for Central England.
- 2003
  - 1 December – The Carlton name is dropped in the Midlands region and it renamed as ITV1 for Central England.
  - All remaining overnight regional programming, including Jobfinder, ends.
- 2004
  - January – The final two remaining English ITV companies, Carlton and Granada, merge to create ITV plc. The regional franchise is rebranded as ITV Central.
- 2005
  - 5 February – Following the closure of the Carlton Studios in Nottingham, production of Central News East moves to the Birmingham studios.
- 2006
  - 24 July – Central News at Six is renamed Central Tonight.
  - 13 November – The ITV1 Central branding, seen before some regional programming, is dropped.
  - 4 December – The South Midlands sub-region is disbanded. The parts of Gloucestershire served by Central South joins the majority of the county already covered by ITV West and begins receiving The West Tonight and Herefordshire is now covered by the West Midlands edition. In the rest of the area, news operations are merged with Meridian West, to form the non-franchise ITV Thames Valley service, broadcasting Thames Valley Today/Tonight from the Meridian West studio in Whiteley, Hampshire. The new programme, which also covers Berkshire, Hampshire and parts of Surrey and Wiltshire retained Central's Abingdon newsroom as the main newsgathering base for the new region but the studio was closed.
- 2007
  - No events.
- 2008
  - December – All non-news local programming ends after Ofcom gives ITV permission to drastically cut back its regional programming. From 2009 the only regional programme is the monthly political discussion show.
- 2009
  - February – ITV makes major cutbacks to its regional broadcasts in England. Central's separate sub-regional news programmes are merged into a pan-regional programme although more localised news continues to be broadcast as a brief opt-out during the early evening programme.

== 2010s ==
- 2010
  - No events.
- 2011
  - 28 September – Digital switchover is completed in the Midlands.
- 2012
  - No events.
- 2013
  - 14 January – ITV's Midlands news service is relaunched and rebranded as ITV News Central.
  - 16 September – Sub-regional news coverage is reintroduced and the weekday daytime, late evening and weekend bulletins as well as 20 minutes of the 6pm programme are once again split for the East and West Midlands.
- 2014
  - The Oxford transmitter is transferred to the Meridian region.

== See also ==
- History of ITV
- History of ITV television idents
- Timeline of ITV
- Timeline of ATV – Central's predecessor
