= Timeline of Meridian Broadcasting =

This is a timeline of the history of the British broadcaster Meridian Broadcasting (now known as ITV Meridian). It has provided the ITV service for the South and South East of England since 1993.

== 1990s ==
- 1991
  - Meridian Broadcasting is formed to apply for the South of England region in the forthcoming ITV franchise round. Intended as a publisher broadcaster, the majority of programmes would be commissioned from independent producers rather than produced in-house.
  - 16 October – The ITC announces that Meridian had been awarded the licence. Meridian had tabled a lower bid that the incumbent broadcaster, TVS, but the ITC awarded the licence because it felt that TVS’ bid of £59 million was too high, meaning that TVS's business plan was deemed to be unsatisfactory. Therefore, Meridian was awarded the licence as the next highest bidder (£36.5 million).
  - 17 December – Meridian purchases TVS's Southampton studio facilities.
- 1992
  - No events.
- 1993
  - 1 January – After the chimes of Big Ben, Meridian Broadcasting goes on air.
  - 20 July – Meridian joins up with HTV, Westcountry Television, Channel Television and S4C to form a joint advertising company operated by Meridian Broadcasting and HTV.
- 1994
  - 19 February – Meridian purchases Anglia Television, the ITV franchise for the east of England.
- 1995
  - No events.
- 1996
  - MAI merges with United Newspapers (via an agreed takeover by United) to form United News & Media. The resulting company owned the Daily Express newspaper, Meridian Broadcasting, Anglia Television, and a large shareholding (through the Yorkshire Post) in Yorkshire Tyne Tees Television, the owners of Yorkshire Television and Tyne Tees Television.
- 1997
  - 28 June – United News & Media takes over HTV.
- 1998
  - 15 November – The public launch of digital terrestrial TV in the UK takes place.
- 1999
  - The television assets of Meridian's owner United News & Media are sold to Granada. However, due to regulations stating that the company could not control that large an audience share, the broadcasting arm of HTV is sold to Carlton Television in exchange for Central Independent Television's 20% stake in Meridian Broadcasting.
  - 8 November – A new, hearts-based on-air look is introduced.

== 2000s ==
- 2000
  - No events.
- 2001
  - 11 August – In all of ITV plc's owned regions, which includes Meridian, ITV's main channel is rebranded as ITV1.
- 2002
  - 28 October – On-air regional identities are dropped apart from when introducing regional programmes and Meridian is renamed ITV1 Meridian.
- 2003
  - No events.
- 2004
  - January – The final two remaining English ITV companies, Carlton and Granada, merge to create a single England and Wales ITV company called ITV plc.
  - 5 December – The famous sun/moon face logo is seen by viewers for the final time.
  - Meridian moves from Northam studio complex to a new studio base in Whiteley, Hampshire.
- 2005
  - No events.
- 2006
  - 4 December – The non-franchised region ITV Thames Valley is launched. It incorporates the former Central South news service and the Meridian North service and both operate as their own sub-regions for non-news programming and for advertising.
- 2007
  - No events.
- 2008
  - December – All non-news local programming ends after Ofcom gives ITV permission to drastically cut back its regional programming. From 2009, the only regional programme is the monthly political discussion show.
- 2009
  - 16 February – As part of ITV's major cutbacks of its operation in England, Meridian's three news services are amalgamated into one. However, part of the programme, and the late night bulletin, remain localised.

== 2010s ==
- 2010
  - No events.
- 2011
  - No events.
- 2012
  - 27 June – The Meridian region completes digital switchover.
- 2013
  - 16 September – The 2009 cutbacks are reversed and once again the Meridian region is served by three opt-out services. However, to maintain lower costs, the main half-hour programme at 6pm contains a minimum 20 minutes of regional news (10 minutes in the Thames Valley) and daily use of "shared content" from outside the region.
- 2014
  - The Oxford transmitter is transferred from the Central to the Meridian region.

== See also ==
- History of ITV
- History of ITV television idents
- Timeline of ITV
- Timeline of TVS – Meridian's predecessor
