= ITV strike =

ITV strike may refer to:

- 1968 ITV strike, which left ITV off the air for a few days and resulted in a transmission of an emergency national service for a few weeks afterward
- Colour Strike, during which ITV technicians would not make programmes in colour
- 1979 ITV strike, which left ITV off the air for eleven weeks
