= Timeline of Westcountry Television =

This is a timeline of the history of the British broadcaster Westcountry Television (later known as ITV Westcountry, and now part of ITV West Country). Westcountry provided the ITV service for the South West of England from 1993 to 2009, after which the service name "ITV West Country" has been used across the West and South West of England.

== 1990s ==
- 1991
  - 16 October – The ITC announces that TSW has lost its licence to broadcast to south west England. It loses out to Westcountry Television. Westcountry had tabled a lower bid but the ITC awarded the licence to Westcountry because it felt that TSW’s bid of £16.1 million was too high. Westcountry was the second highest of the other two applicants and was awarded the licence with a bid of £7.82 million per year.
- 1992
  - 6 February – TSW’s appeal to have the ITC’s decision to relieve TSW of its licence fails when the House of Lords rejects the appeal.
- 1993
  - 1 January – After the chimes of Big Ben, Westcountry Television goes on air.
  - 20 July – Westcountry joins up with HTV, Meridian, Channel Television and S4C to form a joint advertising company operated by Meridian Broadcasting and HTV.
- 1994
  - No events.
- 1995
  - No events.
- 1996
  - 25 November – Carlton Communications buys Westcountry Television.
- 1997
  - No events.
- 1998
  - 15 November – The public launch of digital terrestrial TV in the UK takes place.
- 1999
  - 6 September – Carlton Television drops the Westcountry name from their on-air presentation, instead branding the region as Carlton Westcountry.
  - 8 November – A new, hearts-based on-air look is introduced.

== 2000s ==
- 2000
  - No events.
- 2001
  - No events.
- 2002
  - 28 October – On-air regional identities are dropped apart from when introducing regional programmes and Carlton Westcountry is renamed ITV1 Carlton for the Westcountry.
- 2003
  - 1 December – The Carlton name is dropped in the South West region and it renamed as ITV1 for the Westcountry.
- 2004
  - January – The final two remaining English ITV companies, Carlton and Granada, merge to create a single England and Wales ITV company called ITV plc and the region is known on air when introducing regional programming as ITV1 Westcountry.
- 2005
  - No events.
- 2006
  - No events.
- 2007
  - 12 September – ITV issues a statement to the City of London, saying that it wished to merge ITV West with ITV Westcountry to form a non-franchise region, ITV West and Westcountry, from February 2009.
- 2008
  - December – All non-news local programming ends after Ofcom gives ITV permission to drastically cut back its regional programming. From 2009 the only regional programme is the monthly political discussion show
- 2009
  - 15 February – Westcountry Live is broadcast for the final time.
  - 16 February – As part of major cutbacks across ITV to its regional broadcasts in England the operations of ITV Westcountry and ITV West are merged into a new non-franchise region ITV West & Westcountry. The new ‘region’ results in a merged regional news service based in Bristol called The West Country Tonight. However the first half of the main programme and the entirety of the late evening bulletin remain separate.
  - 9 September – The Westcountry region completes digital switchover.

== 2010s ==
- 2010
  - No events.
- 2011
  - 5 September – Separate weekday daytime bulletins for the two main regions - west and south west - are reintroduced.
- 2012
  - No events.
- 2013
  - 16 September – The south west opt-out from the Bristol-based regional news magazine is restored as fully separate regional programmes on weekdays with shorter daytime and weekend bulletins reintroduced.
- 2014
  - 1 January – Following the formal split of the Wales and West of England regions, a new region covering the merged west and south west regions - ITV West Country - is officially launched.

== See also ==
- History of ITV
- History of ITV television idents
- Timeline of ITV
- Timeline of TSW – Westcountry's predecessor
