= About Anglia =

British ITV news programme (1960–1990)

- Genre: Regional News
- Country of origin: England

Production
- Producer: Anglia Television
- Running time: 30 minutes

Original release
- Network: Anglia Television
- Release: 2 June 1960 – 6 July 1990

Related
- ITV News Anglia

About Anglia is a regional news magazine programme produced by Anglia Television in the east of England, broadcast for over thirty years from 2 June 1960 to 6 July 1990.

== History ==
One of the first regional programmes of its kind on ITV, About Anglia began in May 1960 as a twice-weekly programme, accompanying the ten-minute regional evening news bulletin on weekdays.

Its success prompted it to be extended to four nights a week the following September, and then, every weeknight. Its original main presenter was Dick Joice.

== Features ==
Early regular features included gardening, Police Call and in-depth weather forecasts for the region provided by Anglia's in-house weather department.

Some early elements of About Anglia featured on the short-lived Midday Show, which aired during the first few months of the station, and featured Susan Hampshire among its cast.

== Transmission ==
The programme was transmitted throughout the Anglia region: Norfolk, Suffolk, Essex, Cambridgeshire, Northamptonshire, Bedfordshire, Hertfordshire, Buckinghamshire, Lincolnshire and east Yorkshire.

From 1 January 1974, East Yorkshire, Lincolnshire and parts of north Norfolk (served by the Belmont transmitter) were transferred to the Yorkshire Television area, although the Anglia weather department continued to produce special regional forecasts for the area for several years.

== Demise ==
About Anglia was given a new look on 21 March 1988 when Anglia Television abandoned its original identification, the Anglia knight, a silver statue of a knight on horseback.

Two years later, on 9 July 1990, About Anglia was replaced by Anglia News, which transmitted two programmes:

- Anglia News East for Norfolk, Suffolk, Essex and parts of Cambridgeshire
- Anglia News West for Northamptonshire, Bedfordshire, North Hertfordshire, North Buckinghamshire, South Lincolnshire and the rest of Cambridgeshire.

Both were produced and broadcast from studios at Anglia House in Norwich, long before this became standard practice across ITV regional news services, with reporters in Ipswich, Chelmsford, Cambridge, Peterborough, Northampton, Luton and Milton Keynes, along with a political bureaux at Westminster.

Cutbacks in 2009 led to the reintroduction of a pan-regional programme (known as Anglia Tonight) with shorter sub-regional opt outs – which have since been extended under ITV News Anglia.

== Presenters ==
Many About Anglia personalities moved on to national prominence.

- In 1960, David Dimbleby spent his summer vacation from Oxford University working as an About Anglia reporter. The same year also saw David Frost join the reporting team – his contract was not renewed by Anglia Television, reputedly because management felt he did not have a future in regional television.
- Judy Finnigan came to Anglia in the mid-1970s from Granada Television as a reporter and presenter. She married and settled in Norwich, making her name in 1977 when she gave birth to twin sons and, the following day, showed the babies on About Anglia. She left to return to Granada as co-host of Granada Reports.
- Bob Wellings, covering offbeat stories, became a presenter of BBC Television's current affairs Nationwide programme in 1971, staying there until 1979.
- Alastair Yates joined About Anglia in 1987 following a period with Grampian Television's North Tonight, but left two years later to become the first presenter on Sky News in Britain.

Other presenters and journalists who regularly appeared include:

- Tony Adams
- Patrick Anthony
- Rebecca Atherstone
- John Bacon
- Greg Barnes
- Paul Barnes
- Surrey Beddows
- Graham Bell
- Vic Birtles
- Malcolm Brabant
- Lindsay Brooke
- Griselda Cann
- Stephen Chambers
- Stephen Cole
- David Delvin (the show's resident medical expert)
- Geoff Druett
- David Geary
- Dick Graham
- Anne Gregg
- Lionel Hampden
- Gerry Harrison
- David Henshaw
- Stuart Jarrold
- David Jennings
- Chris Kelly
- John Kiddey
- Alison Leigh
- Peter Lugg
- Helen McDermott
- Guy Michelmore
- Caroline Oldrey (presenter of the last About Anglia)
- Jeremy Payne
- Jane Probyn
- Caroline Raison
- Pam Rhodes
- Steve Rider
- Owen Spencer-Thomas
- Christine Webber
- Chris Young
