= ATV Midlands News =

British ITV news programme (1956–1969)

- Genre: Regional News
- Country of origin: United Kingdom

Production
- Running time: 5–10 minutes approx.

Original release
- Network: ATV
- Release: 7 May 1956 – 1969

Related
- ITV News Central

ATV Midlands News is a regional television news programme, produced by ATV, that served the English Midlands.

First broadcast on Monday 7 May 1956, ATV Midlands News was one of the first daily regional news services on British television, originally consisting of a short early evening summary of local headlines read by Patricia Cox (one of the first female newsreaders on British television) with stories often sourced directly from the Birmingham Evening Despatch, a local newspaper.

Film footage of news and events was later introduced to the bulletins and shot by Birmingham Commercial Films, an independent company which specialised in providing newsreel and stock footage.

From 1958, the nightly Midlands News bulletins were supplemented by Midland Montage, a weekly topical magazine programme presented by Leslie Dunn and ATV continuity announcer Pat Astley. A year later, ATV set up its own news film unit for both programmes.

In October 1964, following pressure from the Independent Television Authority to improve regional coverage, ATV introduced a nightly news magazine programme, ATV Today, which supplemented and eventually superseded the Midlands News bulletins in 1969.

ATV Midlands continued providing regional news coverage within both ATV Today and shorter ATV News bulletins until 31 December 1981.
