= Anglia knight =

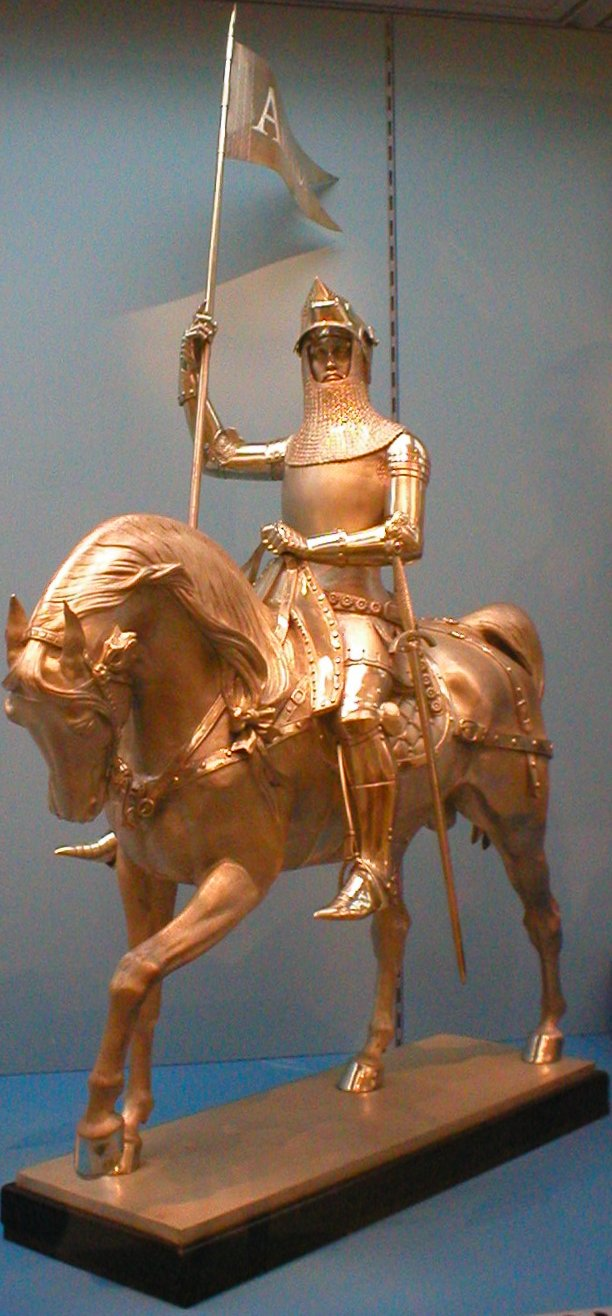
The Anglia knight

The Anglia knight is a sterling silver trophy commissioned by William III of the Netherlands in 1850 for the Falcon Club, a society that met once a year to compete in horse races, falconry and other sports. The trophy weighs over 700 troy ounces (22 kg, 48 lbs)

The trophy is widely thought to be modelled on the statue of Richard I outside the Palace of Westminster, but more closely follows a planned statue by Carlo Marochetti of Edward the Black Prince that is in the Royal Collection as can be seen by the stance of the horse. The Dutch King commissioned the statue from a London silversmith in 1850, expecting to win it in a falconry contest, but an Englishman won and brought the statue back to the United Kingdom, and his family owned it for a century. Arguably its most famous use was as the symbol of Anglia Television, the ITV station for the East of England, from launch in 1959 until 1988. Shortly before the station's launch, its chairman, Lord Townshend, had spotted the trophy at the Bond Street jewellers, Asprey, and purchased it almost on impulse; Asprey subsequently added the "Anglia" pennon to the lance.

The silver statue was Anglia's original ident, with various parts of the trophy shown. At the end, the camera zoomed in on the pennon which showed the station's name. An arrangement by Malcolm Sargent, of Handel's Water Music was played over the film. The logo became so closely identified with the station that when Anglia produced a book to mark its fortieth anniversary in 1999, it was entitled A Knight On The Box. With the introduction of colour television on ITV in November 1969 (although not in the Anglia region until October 1970), the ident was remade with constant lighting, and the knight rotating on a turntable – a longer version of the ident was used at the start of the day's transmission until the mid 1980s.

On 21 March 1988, the knight was replaced by a new identity. It made brief reappearances in 1999 and 2009 to celebrate Anglia's 40th and 50th anniversaries.

The trophy is usually displayed at ITV Anglia reception at Anglia House in Norwich. It was on loan to the Museum of Norwich at the Bridewell until 5 October 2019 as part of an exhibition celebrating life in Norwich in 1959.

The logo for Anglian Home Improvements also depicts a knight on horseback.
