= ITV Emergency National Service =

Temporary service during the technicians' strike in August 1968

The ITV Emergency National Service was the management response to the near-complete Independent Television (ITV) technicians' strike immediately after the 1968 franchise changes took effect.

During the national ITV technicians' strike between 3 and 18 August 1968, the individual companies were off the air for several weeks and an emergency service was presented by management personnel with no regional variations. This was the first time that a uniform presentation practice was adopted across all regions. This did not happen again until ITV's first few days back on air following the technicians' strike of 1979, which blacked out the channel for 75 days.

== Presentation ==
All programmes played during the service were repeats or had been pre-made for forthcoming transmission. Other than continuity, there was no live material. The programmes were transmitted from the ATV switching centre at Foley Street in London, while a team of ex-ABC announcers based in both Teddington and Foley Street provided presentation.

The announcing team for the special service was mainly David Hamilton, John Benson, Sheila Kennedy and Philip Elsmore, who would all continue as Thames announcers when the regional services restarted at the end of the strike.

The service was mounted at short notice after several days of blank screens. The management team behind the emergency service had needed to create a quick and simple national presentation style. The term "Independent Television" was chosen for the temporary national station (as the term "ITV" was relatively little used until the 1970s) and a range of text-only captions also provided. No symbol was used – the ident was simply the name in upper-case characters. A clock was borrowed from the studios at Teddington and the ABC triangle on the clock was mostly covered with tape.

== Tuning signals ==
For the first three days of the service, an insert of the local "Picasso" tuning signal was tried along with a start-up tune before switching to the national output. To avoid confusion over regions, the ITA provided the Foley Street centre with a copy of the blank "Picasso" containing no regional identifier. A version with the words "Independent Television" was commissioned but did not arrive until the final few days of the service and was only used briefly at the end of the period.

This short service was not wholly consistent in presentation, and opened on some days with Picasso card and ident, whilst on other days only the ident card appeared. A march ("Here Comes the Band" by Robert Farnon, which also featured in The Prisoner) was chosen as the daily opening music.

== Advertising ==
With a national service being provided, all advertising spots needed to be sold on a national basis. Therefore, a new rate card was introduced, charging £2,000 for 30 seconds of advertising time before 7.00pm and £3,500 after 7.00pm.

Prior to the strike, a 30-second advert in the London region alone would have cost £1,200. Although large national companies benefited from the lower rates, local companies who had previously advertised in their relevant region only were unable to do so during the emergency national service. As not all products or services advertised were sold nationwide, commercial breaks were often included with a disclaimer stating that some items advertised may not be available locally.

== Schedules ==
During the course of the emergency management run service the network would be on air each day from around 4.45pm and would continue until 11.45pm as filled with repeats, imports and movies. This would be near normal typical broadcasting hours in 1968 for ITV, as well as the BBC who were limited by the government to no more than eight hours per day of regular television programming in their regular daily schedules (with schools, adult education, religious and sporting coverages exempted from this daily limit).

Below is an example of one typical day during the strike on Thursday 8 August 1968:

- 4.40pm – Jimmy Green and his Time Machine
- 4.55pm – Bugs Bunny
- 5.20pm – The Queen Street Gang
- 5.50pm – News from ITN
- 6.04pm – Driveway
- 6.30pm – Film: Gold of the Seven Saints
- 8.00pm – The Goon Show
- 8.30pm – The Crime Buster
- 9.30pm – This Week
- 10.00pm – News from ITN
- 10.15pm – Cinema
- 10.45pm – Destination Mexico
- 11.15pm – The Variety Club from Batley, West Riding of Yorkshire
- 11.45pm – PR for the Parson (Epilogue) followed by weather forecast
- 12.00am – Closedown

== See also ==
- 1968 in British television
- Colour Strike
