= ITV Schools =

Educational television service of ITV

- Network: ITV (1957–1987); Channel 4, S4C (1987–1993)
- Launched: 13 May 1957; 69 years ago (ITV); 14 September 1987; 39 years ago (Channel 4, S4C)
- Closed: 29 June 1987; 39 years ago (ITV); 28 June 1993; 33 years ago (Channel 4, S4C)
- Country of origin: United Kingdom
- Formerly known as: Independent Television for Schools and Colleges
- Format: Educational programming
- Running time: Variable (1957–1972); 150 minutes (1972–1993)
- Original languages: English; Welsh (S4C Ysgolion)
- Known as S4C Schools in Wales; replaced by Channel 4 Schools in 1993 (later renamed 4Learning in 2000)

ITV Schools (full name: Independent Television for Schools and Colleges) was the educational television service set up in 1957 by the Independent Television Authority, broadcasting learning programmes for children ages 5 to 18 across ITV-affiliated stations. It was an example of public service broadcasting on a commercial television network (as opposed to the public BBC and their service BBC Schools).

ITV moved its schools programming to Channel 4 and S4C in autumn 1987 although ITV continued to produce programmes and the service continued to use the ITV name for another six years. The final block of programmes under the ITV Schools banner were aired on Monday 28 June 1993; Channel 4 then took over production after the summer break, rebranding the block as Channel 4 Schools in September 1993 and later 4Learning, before finally discontinuing the service in 2009.

== History ==
The service started on 13 May 1957 with a small audience, limited largely to the London area via its weekday franchise-holder Associated-Rediffusion. The service expanded as stations were added to the ITV network, and continued for the next 30 years, broadcasting a schedule of memorable documentaries, drama and entertainment programmes aimed at children between the ages of 5 and 18. These were almost all made by the various companies of the ITV network, mainly the largest ones such as Thames Television, ATV, Central Independent Television, Granada Television and Yorkshire Television.

Until the early 1970s, broadcasting hours were regulated by the British government. The commercial broadcasters, therefore, reserved their most commercial output for peak viewing hours and used the remainder of their broadcasting hours to put out their contractually obligated programming, conveniently enough, at a time when children were at school. Networked programmes for schools and colleges were mostly made by the "big four" weekday broadcasters Yorkshire, Granada, Thames and ATV, and were screened during the late morning and early afternoon, after which the network would close down until children's programmes commenced later in the afternoon.

Following changes to the law taking effect from Monday 16 October 1972, which allowed an extra 20 hours of broadcasting a week, the schools broadcasts were moved to a morning slot, between the hours of 09:30 and 12:00 during term time. This enabled the ITV broadcasters to open up the afternoon schedule to sell advertising between programmes; advertising was strictly prohibited during schools broadcasts.

The ITV Schools broadcasts gave teachers access to a broad spectrum of teaching resources, such as documentary film with which to illustrate their regular lessons, or songs and stories for children to learn and discuss, and could be considered an early example of multimedia learning. Activities and booklets based on the programmes were available to teachers via the educational officers based at the local ITV companies, allowing students to develop a relationship with the regular broadcasts. Typically, schools were equipped for schools television with a couple of large television receivers, sometimes housed inside a wooden cabinet atop a wheeled trolley which could be moved between classrooms as required.

This arrangement lasted until Monday 29 June 1987.

=== Programming during labour disputes ===
In the summer and early autumn of 1979, ITV was off the air for eleven weeks due to a strike that was called by EETPU and the ACTT, which resulted in the cancellation of all schools programming for the first part of the autumn 1979 term. The programming that was due for transmission in the autumn term was transferred to the spring and summer terms of 1980.

In the autumn of 1984, Thames Television was involved in a series of labour disputes that caused the schools programmes that it produced to not be aired for a portion of the term. These programmes would be rerun nationally in December 1984, with schools in the Thames area being shown the backlog of programmes from the Yorkshire, Granada, and Central franchises, which were unable to be transmitted as the dispute caused broadcast equipment to be disabled.

== Presentation ==
Schools programmes on ITV were generally between ten and twenty minutes in length. Unlike peak-time programmes (which were usually scheduled at times rounded up to the nearest five minutes), schools programmes were scheduled at very precise times, such as 10:03 or 11:32. Some individual regions, such as HTV Wales, sometimes showed their own programming instead of the network offerings, but would rejoin the network in time for the next scheduled programme, so it was necessary to devise a flexible presentation system which would allow the network to effectively fill the time between programmes without resorting to showing a blank screen. Until 1968 network schools presentation was provided initially by Associated-Rediffusion in London before it transferred to ATV and later, Central Independent Television in Birmingham with live announcements made by ATV and Central's staff announcers including Mike Prince, Stewart White, Peter Davies and Su Evans.

Between programmes, interval music was played and a holding slide shown onscreen, identifying the service as Independent Television For Schools And Colleges and thus differentiating the service from the similar schools TV service run by the BBC, which were listed as "For Schools, Colleges" in the Radio Times until BBC Schools broadcasting moved to BBC2 in autumn 1983 with a new title of Daytime on Two. This holding slide could be shown for anything from a few seconds to a few minutes, depending on the length of time required to fill. A different theme for the holding slides was used each term, and usually each week a different slide would be used.

Exactly one minute before the start of the programme, the slide was replaced by a clock showing sixty second-marks, which gradually disappeared until there were none left. This gave the teacher one final minute in which to calm the class down before the programme began. A suitably timed piece of library music, changed once a term and often taken from the Bruton Music library, accompanied the animation. After this an announcement for teachers or details of how to order any accompanying material was broadcast before going into the programme.

The image of the 'schools countdown clock' has taken on something of a cult status, as referenced in programmes such as Look Around You, and produced an image fondly remembered by generations of British schoolchildren. Look Around You series 1 was also a satire of ITV Schools and BBC Schools.

== ITV Schools on Channel Four and S4C ==
After 30 years on ITV, the service moved to Channel 4 and S4C from 14 September 1987, allowing ITV to concentrate on building a fully commercial daytime schedule, although on Friday 12 June and Thursday 25 June the service had been broadcast on Channel 4 as a form of trial, whilst ITV broadcast ITN's coverage of the 1987 election and the state opening of Parliament. On these occasions, any regional variation programming was transmitted nationally after midday.

In the run up to the move to Channel 4 and S4C, trailers were shown after schools programmes (and, in some regions, during regular programming) to promote the move, as well while also acknowledging and commemorating the 30th anniversary of the service. Also a programme presented by Anna Ford looking back at 30 years of ITV schools output was transmitted in May 1987 but was repeated on 13 September 1987.

Just two pieces of interval music were used after September 1987: The Journey for a 3D holding device, and Just a Minute which backed a redesigned clock. The music never changed on a termly basis during this era.

The two pieces of music used on Channel 4, The Journey and Just A Minute, were both written in 1986 by "James Aldenham", which was a pseudonym for Brian Bennett, former drummer with The Shadows, and who has, for many years, written TV themes, such as the BBC golf theme tune. Just a Minute also featured as background music on Coronation Street on 22 March 1998.

The transmission times were the same, 09:30 to 12:00. At 09:28, the four ITV logos glided onto stage, followed by the first minute of The Journey, before gliding off stage. The 3D countdown clock spun onto screen at this point. For all other programmes the holding device would be faded up, and The Journey faded in on a backtimed basis so that it would end one minute before the next programme began. Once the tune had reached the end, the ITV logos glided off stage, and were replaced by the clock. Presentation was handled by Channel 4 in London with announcements for support material pre-recorded and voiced mainly by Central announcer Ted May in Birmingham (a role initially filled by Paul Veysey, another Central announcer).

On ITV, at the end of schools programmes, the regional ITV announcers would make their own closing announcements over a holding slide, before introducing the lunchtime programming. On Channel 4, however, at the end of schools programming, on 12 June and 25 June, Nothing Doing played over a caption stating that schools programming would be shown the next day on ITV before showing the interval caption and then fading back to black before the testcard and music. At the end of schools programming from 14 September, the ITV logos glided onto stage, with the first ten seconds of The Journey. This was rapidly faded to black, after which the Channel 4 logo appeared and the announcer introduced the next programme.

On the first afternoon after schools programming, Channel 4 showed a film because programmes for the Open College and Business Daily began transmission week commencing 21 September 1987.

If there was a gap should schools programmes finish early, Channel 4 would show a menu of programmes beginning at 12.00 accompanied by music, but if programmes ended early in another ITV region (ie Scottish/Grampian/Border or Ulster) then the holding device would play until the network was ready to hand back to Channel 4.

From Monday 9 January 1989, Sesame Street was shown at 8.30am so Channel 4 showed a menu of programmes with music prior to the transmission of schools programmes pre-recorded by announcer Nigel Lambert. After the introduction of breakfast television in April 1989, it was necessary to extend the first interval to five minutes due to the 9:25 am finish time of The Channel 4 Daily. For the first three minutes, Channel 4 would play one of their own interval tracks – between April 1989 and the end of 1991 over a still of the 3D clock and throughout 1992, the ITV "rotomotion" between 13 January 1992 and 1 December 1992. In both cases, at 09:27:50 the music and image would be faded out, and then at exactly 09:28 the 3D logos glided onto stage. At the same time the educational officers employed by the ITV companies saw their contracts terminated and a new company called the Educational Television Company was established to continue the relationship between teachers and the schools service when it came to ordering accompanying support material.

From Monday 11 January 1993, the holding device was no longer used for the first programme, and the introduction cut into 40 seconds of the clock. The holding device did appear for all other programmes. This ended on Monday 28 June 1993, signalling the end of this particular era and style of schools television broadcast. The very last programme on ITV Schools on 4 was The Technology Programme, at 11:41 am.

=== Regional variations ===
Between September 1987 and June 1992, Grampian Television, Scottish Television, Border Television, Ulster Television (UTV) and S4C opted out of the main ITV Schools on Channel 4 service to show regional ITV Schools programmes such as Swings & Roundabouts.

On S4C, Welsh-language programmes were seen under the S4C Ysgolion banner, and used their own holding devices and clock similar to ITV Schools, but used the same music as the national holding device. S4C used the traditional ITV Schools holding device for English language programmes, but the S4C logo was keyed over the Channel 4 logo on the aston bar at the bottom of the screen.

In preparation for Channel 4 becoming independent of ITV, all regional variations ended at the end of the Summer Term in June 1992, with all programmes, such as Videomaths and How We Used to Live, fully networked. The only exception was S4C in Wales, which continued to opt out some English programmes for its Welsh-language programmes. This continued after ITV Schools was re-branded as Channel 4 Schools, with S4C adopting S4C Schools for its English programmes, continuing to use S4C Ysgolion for its Welsh programmes.

== Channel 4 Schools ==
From 20 September 1993, the strand was known as Channel 4 Schools. Another big change was that, for the first time, independent production companies were now able to produce schools programming as well as the ITV companies; this included Thames Television-produced schools programmes as it was now an independent production company following the loss of its ITV franchise at the end of the previous year. Channel 4 Schools was later renamed 4Learning in April 2000.

The schools programming always had elements which differ from the normal presentational package. In 1993, the Channel 4 Schools idents featured famous people in one category, with light shining on them in front of an industrial-looking setting supplemented by instrumental calming music. This changed in 1996 with the circles look to numerous children touching the screen, forming circles of information then picked up by other children. The last child would produce the Channel 4 logo in the form of three vertical circles, with another in the middle and to the left containing the Channel 4 logo.

In April 2007, the commercial arm and rights exploitation of its programmes and support materials was sold to Espresso Education and renamed Channel 4 Learning. New educational programmes for schools continued to be broadcast until autumn 2009, although they were usually moved into commercially unviable timeslots, such as during the morning and overnight, where they could be video-recorded by teachers for later consumption. This marked the final term with regularly scheduled schools broadcasts on the network, however some were repeated in spring 2010 before being fully discontinued. The usual standard Channel 4 presentation devices were employed between programmes.

From the autumn of 2010, the BBC was now the only major broadcast outlet for schools programmes in Britain.

== Incidental music ==
- Suite No. 2 in B minor, BWV 1067 Movement 7 Badinerie (flute)

== See also ==
- BBC Schools
