= History of ITV television idents =

The ITV television network in the United Kingdom began as a group of regional stations, each with its own identity. Each station used its own idents to establish an individual identity.

In 1989, the first attempt to establish a national ITV corporate identity was made, combining regional brands with a new national ITV brand. The attempt met with only limited success: some companies never adopted the ITV branding, while many others later diluted or abandoned the ITV component over time. A second attempt in 1998 was more successful but was still rejected or significantly modified by some companies.

In 2002, a significant change in appearance occurred when all ITV regions in England adopted national continuity. Regional logos disappeared, and regional names were mentioned only before regional programmes. This effectively transformed ITV1 in England into a national channel with slots for regional opt-outs—similar to BBC One—rather than a collection of independent regional broadcasters sharing programmes.

The unification was further consolidated in 2004 when Granada plc acquired Carlton Communications to form ITV plc. By this time, the two companies had acquired all the regional Channel 3 companies in England and Wales. ITV plc later went on to acquire Channel Television in the Channel Islands and UTV in Northern Ireland.

This article examines the history of the presentation of the ITV brand on the main ITV network. The other digital channels owned by ITV plc also adopted logos similar to the main ITV channel but with different colour schemes and background images; however, these are not covered in this article.

== Before 1981 ==
When ITV was established in 1955, each regional company had its own unique logo and identity for use and identification within the network. The name "ITV" was rarely used on air and had no associated broadcast logo.

From the mid-1970s to the mid-1980s, the Independent Broadcasting Authority (IBA) regulator used a matching pair of logos for ITV and Independent Local Radio (ILR), although these appear to have been used solely in print.

== 1981 – September 1989 ==
From 1981, a generic, 'blocky-looking' logo was occasionally used throughout the 1980s, often appearing in a rainbow colour scheme for promotions produced by the "Big Five" franchises: Thames Television, LWT, Granada Television, Yorkshire Television, and ATV (which had by then rebranded as Central Independent Television). It was also used on holding slides by some regions and Channel 4 (for cross-promotion purposes). However, it was never widely adopted as the central element of an identity.

== September 1989 – October 1998 ==
ITV generic logo used from 1 September 1989 to 4 October 1998

A new generic ITV logo was introduced on 1 September 1989, accompanied by the first national on-air identity, designed by English Markell Pockett with music composed by Lord David Dundas. The logo formed the centrepiece of an entire branding package, which included a national logo and regional variations for each of the ITV franchises. Each franchise's distinctive element was incorporated into the "V" of the ITV logo.

The ident typically began with the franchise's logo, followed by a sliding sequence featuring an Arctic tern, a couple in period dress, Big Ben, an athlete, and a pair of dancers, before transitioning to the regional ITV logo. In addition, each franchise received a regional clock, trailer style, network font, and break bumpers as part of the package.

However, the new look did not go as the designers had intended:

- Anglia Television, Channel Television, TVS, TSW, and Ulster Television did not adopt the look at all. However, the logo appeared on network trailers, end boards (identifying the company that produced the programme or feature), and at the start of some networked programmes, such as Morning Worship.
- Granada Television used a modified version to align with their existing branding package.
- Yorkshire Television altered its moving ident on 7 January 1991, replacing the triangle shape with their full 'chevron' logo, which zoomed into the centre of the screen at the end of the ident. A different font was also introduced.

The use of the 1989 ITV branding varied across regions and was dropped at different times:

- Scottish Television used the ident sparingly alongside its own and discontinued it by early 1990.
- Granada Television replaced their altered version of the ident in 1991 with their own branding package.
- Thames Television ceased using the 1989 package entirely a few weeks after losing their franchise to Carlton Television in 1991. They replaced it with their own presentation package, introduced on 3 September 1990.
- Tyne Tees Television returned to their own new-look package on 25 February 1991 but retained the music in subsequent idents.
- LWT discontinued the package after 30 August 1992.
- HTV completely dropped the look and introduced their own presentation package with a new logo on 1 January 1993.
- Central Television initially used the original version but quickly revised it, adding variations linked to their branding, including their own fanfare. In September 1990, Central launched a new presentation package that still featured the ITV logo in some idents, though these were gradually phased out on 31 January 1993.
- Border Television used the generic ident for news junctions around 1991 but primarily adopted new idents recycled from ITV seasonal packages, retaining the same jingle. From September 1994, the generic ident was no longer used.
- Yorkshire Television discontinued the package after 21 October 1994 and introduced their own versions.
- Grampian Television continued using the 1989 generic ident until ITV's new corporate logo was introduced in October 1998. By this time, they had been acquired by SMG.

== October 1998 – October 2002 ==
ITV logo used from 5 October 1998 to 10 August 2001

On 5 October 1998, the ITV logo was changed to a lowercase design in blue and yellow. On 8 November 1999, the next generic look was launched, designed by English and Pockett with music by Lord David Dundas, both of whom were involved with the previous look. The main theme of this look was the ITV slogan "TV from the heart." There were three variations of the ident:

- Opening Film: This featured a heart shape at the end, followed by a transition to a spinning hearts background with the region name and the ITV logo below it, sometimes with their logo in a small box above the name, or occasionally just the ITV logo on its own.
- Standalone:
  - The ITV logo formed from lines coming across from the sides of the screen over the spinning hearts background.
  - The ITV logo fully formed on a spinning hearts background.
- With the regions:
  - The name, logo, and ITV logo formed from lines coming across from the sides of the screen over the spinning hearts background.
  - The name, logo, and ITV logo were fully formed on a spinning hearts background.

The lines and static idents could also feature a brown-tinted spinning hearts background, which was used during daytime schedules. This look was accompanied by a clock superimposed on the spinning hearts background, as well as promotions provided by ITV's Network Promotions Unit. A "heartbreak" bumper was also included. Upon launch and over time, some changes were made to the look:

The first ITV1 logo, a minor adjustment to the previous logo, used from 11 August 2001 to 27 October 2002

- In 2000, the website addresses of the Granada and UNM-owned regions were added.
- On 11 August 2001, ITV changed its name to ITV1, and the logo was updated accordingly.
- Border Television did not use their logo with this look.
- HTV and LWT used their logo in place of their name on the end slides.
- In November 2001, an animated "itv.com" website logo was added to the bottom of the idents for all regions.
- By November 2001, most regions had discontinued the live-action startups.
- To facilitate cross-channel promotions, the logos of ITV2 and the ITV Sport Channel were also added to the idents.

As with the previous look, not all companies adopted it:

- The Granada and UNM-owned regions—Granada Television, Tyne Tees Television, Yorkshire Television, LWT, Meridian Broadcasting, and Anglia Television—along with the then-independent Border Television, all fully adopted the look.
- The Carlton-owned regions—Carlton Television, Central Independent Television and Westcountry Television—adopted most elements of the look, except for the idents. Instead, on 6 September 1999, they launched their own version of the hearts, designed by Lambie-Nairn, rather than using the generic idents. This look meant both the Westcountry Television and Central Independent Television brands were retired in favor of the Carlton brand. The idents featured an animation with dynamic hearts, ending with a star flashing in the top-right corner of the heart to reveal the Carlton Television logo, with a star next to it, the ITV logo underneath, and the Carlton website at the bottom, set against a rotating star background.
- Channel Television fully adopted the look, creating a complete rebrand using its elements. Major changes included a new logo (featuring comets forming a heart around a spinning globe) and a new slogan, "The Heart of the Islands." They used the idents but with a completely different soundtrack and were the only region to use the clock ident.
- HTV was owned by UNM, so they initially adopted the Hearts look. However, when the UNM-owned regions were sold to Granada, HTV was instead sold to Carlton due to competition concerns. Because HTV is now owned by Carlton, in July 2001, they adopted a hybrid ident of the Heart and Star. The new idents started with one of the Carlton animations, but the flash was shaped like a heart and zoomed out to form the "V" of the HTV logo, overlaid on the same blue spinning hearts background as before.
- UTV, Grampian Television, and Scottish Television did not adopt the look and instead continued with their own branding. Both Grampian Television and Scottish Television later adopted a unified look featuring a blue square, which lasted from 2000 until 2003.

Once again, similar to the previous look, it was dropped at different times:

- LWT dropped the look on 24 March 2000 following constant complaints from its staff, replacing it with their own video wall idents, which lasted until 2002.
- The Granada-owned regions—Granada Television, Tyne Tees Television, Yorkshire Television, LWT, and by then, Meridian Broadcasting, Anglia Television, and Border Television—dropped the hearts on 28 October 2002.
- The Carlton-owned regions—Carlton Television, Central Independent Television, Westcountry Television, and by then, HTV—dropped the stars on 28 October 2002. They were all replaced by the celebrity idents, which lasted until 2004.
- Channel Television dropped the heart idents on 28 October 2002 but retained the clock for a few more months. They also kept the hearts logo and slogan until these were replaced with the January 2006 rebrand.

== October 2002 – October 2004 ==
Updated logo used from 28 October 2002 until 31 October 2004

On Monday 28 October 2002, a new ident package was rolled out across the regions, featuring the central theme of a celebrity posing 'backstage'. The clip would show the celebrity relaxing when they were supposedly off-screen. By this point, the 'ITV1' logo had been softened with smoother edges and would animate into the bottom right-hand corner, formed from three aligned blue blocks and one yellow block.

This package also coincided with the centralisation of continuity from the English, Isle of Man, and Scottish Border regions to London. As a result, announcers were sourced from a national team of six, broadcasting live from the Carlton/LWT continuity booth, even during regional idents. Wales, however, retained its own announcers for the time being.

The ITV1 brand replaced regional branding across the majority of the network, with regional idents restricted to use before local news and other regional programming, except in Scotland, Wales and Northern Ireland where regional idents remained in use for all programming. The regional idents varied subtly:

- Grampian Television and Scottish Television used the national idents but replaced the ITV1 logo with their own two-toned blue oblong logo. They adopted this look in 2003.
- UTV also used the main idents but replaced the ITV1 logo with their own purple and yellow logo.
- Channel Television used their ident only before local programmes. Their ident featured local celebrities, with the left half of the screen displaying the Channel heart logo on a navy blue background.
- Six of the Granada-owned regions—Anglia, Border, Granada, Meridian, Tyne Tees, and Yorkshire Television—featured a celebrity, while the left-hand side of the screen showed the franchise name in yellow against a navy blue box, which included the ITV1 logo.
- Two of the Carlton-owned regions—Westcountry and Central—featured the same as above, except with the Carlton logo below the ITV1 logo outside of a blue box.
  - At least one Carlton-owned region—HTV West—now featured the line "West of England" below the ITV1 logo.
  - One Carlton-owned region—HTV Wales—was renamed ITV1 Wales. They used idents featuring a yellow oblong containing the word "WALES" beneath the ITV1 logo.
- The Carlton-owned region—Carlton Television, as well as the Granada-owned region—LWT—now have no regional idents whatsoever. Both regions now had no on-screen identity—no regional names were retained. Before regional programming, a national ident was used, with an announcer saying, "You're watching ITV1 for London."

A generic ident, featuring just the four coloured blocks forming the ITV1 logo on a plain dark blue background, was first seen on 25 December 2002 to introduce the Queen's Christmas message. The ident was later added to the regular rotation from March 2003, primarily to introduce the news. At the same time, a variant with a lighter blue background with clouds was introduced, mainly used for news programmes during the daytime.

The idents were updated with new sets and celebrities on 1 September 2003, featuring more pronounced blues and yellows, and removing the backstage feel. Along with this, the backgrounds of the news ident and the regional idents were changed to overlapping blue or yellow squares.

A number of regions changed their identities throughout this period:

- The Granada-owned regions—Anglia Television, Border Television, Granada Television, Meridian Broadcasting, Tyne Tees and Yorkshire Television, as well as the still-independent Channel Television region and briefly the Carlton Television and LWT shared region, all kept the national and regional idents, including the updated idents in 2003.
- Three of the Carlton-owned regions—Central Independent Television, HTV West and Westcountry Television—used the national idents but dropped the regional idents three months after the updated look in 2003, replacing them with their own. These featured regional landscapes with three large blue cubes and a large yellow cube spread across the landscape. By then, with the exception of the HTV West region, the Carlton name had been entirely dropped from on-air presentation. The ITV1 logo was featured in the bottom-right corner, with a caption below stating "ITV1 for Central England", "ITV1 for the West of England", and "ITV1 for the Westcountry" respectively.
  - At least one Carlton-owned region—HTV Wales—used their own package but adapted it three months after the updated look in 2003, so that programming only shown in Wales used the landscape idents from the Central, HTV West, and Westcountry regions. Prior to national programming, the celebrity idents were used.
- The Grampian and Scottish Television regions kept the 2002 idents and adopted the refreshed news idents and break bumpers in 2003.

The look was dropped at different times:

- The Granada and Carlton-owned regions, namely Anglia, Border, Carlton Television, Central, HTV Wales, HTV West, Granada, LWT, Meridian, Tyne Tees, Westcountry, and Yorkshire Television regions, all dropped the look in 2004.
- UTV dropped the look following the refresh in 2003, adopting their own regional pictures ident.
- The Grampian and Scottish Television regions kept the 2002 celebrity idents until 2006.
- Channel Television kept the look until 2004.

== November 2004 – January 2006 ==
The ITV1 logo was broken into blocks and was used from 1 November 2004 to 15 January 2006

1 November 2004 heralded a new on-air look, coinciding with the launch of ITV3. The ITV1 logo was reworked, splitting it into separate squares. On-screen, the boxes were arranged as a large yellow square containing the '1', with blue ITV boxes on top. This logo would be seen against a generic background featuring a blue sky with clouds, windows of a high-rise building, underwater with bubbles floating by, abstract blue lights, and dark blue ribbons flowing against a blue silk background.

The plan for these idents was to use them as mini-menus, showing what was coming up soon. The idents would zoom to the left, allowing a short video and description of the upcoming programmes to be shown before the panels of the videos became part of the ITV1 logo in the centre of the screen. They were not designed to be traditional idents; however, despite the fact that ITV employed a team of associate producers to create these promotions, the promotional idents were used less and less as the months went on.

During this period, Granada took over Carlton and renamed itself ITV plc. Additionally, ITV spent much of this time using themed idents specific to particular programmes, such as Celebrity Love Island.

Once again, not all of the companies adopted the look:

- The ITV plc regions, by then all renamed, including ITV Anglia, ITV Border, ITV London, ITV Central, ITV Granada, ITV Wales & West, ITV Meridian, ITV Tyne Tees, ITV Westcountry, and ITV Yorkshire, all adopted the look.
- The SMG plc regions, namely Grampian and Scottish, did not adopt the look, continuing with their 2002 national celebrity-themed idents until 2006.
- UTV opted for an in-house design based on pictures of the region.
- Channel Television used the break bumpers but instead featured their hearts logo against filmed shots of the Channel Islands.

Regional idents were available and featured the ITV1 logo with the region name written underneath, set against a background of varying shades of dark blue. However, the ident became less frequently seen, usually only before some local news bulletins and the decreasing amount of regional programming. ITV1 Wales was the exception, with the name "Wales" added to the bottom of all idents in their package.

The ITV plc regions, the only regions to adopt the look, dropped it in 2006 in favour of a complete overhaul. The final idents (ribbons and clouds) were shown on 16 January 2006 before GMTV, without any spoken continuity announcements.

== 2006 - 2013 ==
=== January 2006: "Brand 2010" ===
In April 2005, ITV marketing director Clare Salmon began a plan to rebrand ITV after its fiftieth anniversary in September. Campaign refused comments from Salmon, other than the fact that she was at a branding workshop with M&CSaatchi to develop the identity. This implied the end of the blue and yellow colour scheme. ITV4 became the first channel to adopt the new brand on 1 November 2005.

On 16 January 2006, a brand new logo and presentation package was launched. It aligned ITV1, ITV2, and ITV3 with ITV4. This was part of a major rebrand of the ITV network, known as Brand 2010, which also included the News and Sport divisions, as well as off-screen content. The rebrand was designed by Red Bee Media following a perception analysis conducted by the audience. The results revealed that, although all the ITV channels shared a strong combined brand with the ITV logo, they appeared too similar, lacked distinct identities, and had blurred programming values. Additionally, the ITV logo itself was perceived as becoming monotonous.

The solution was to create a new logo in a rounded-off box, featuring the lowercase "itv". It was claimed that this design made the service appear friendly, while retaining the intention of the 1998 logo, but with a fresh and crisp look. They then added an extra rectangle on the other side of the channel name. All the channels shared this look, with the only major difference being the colour, apart from the channel name itself. This provided the distinctiveness and unity they sought.

The ITV1 idents were created with the idea that ITV1 is "capable of provoking reactions from everyone" and "its programming captures a range of human emotions" leading to the creation of the so-called 'Emotion' idents. Many of these were filmed in South Africa and featured a montage of unrelated scenes, such as a man rubbing his bare chest, girls rolling down a hill, and two people hugging trees. These scenes represented moods such as joy, pride, sadness, and love, among others. In the idents, the 'ITV1' logo would open out and enclose the footage it was superimposed onto. The exception to this was an ident featuring the ITV1 logo on a black background, used to introduce the news.

This look featured one regional ident, 'Pride,' which was used before regional programming and also at the 19:00 and 22:30 junctions on Thursdays, with an announcer sometimes mentioning the regional station, and these were also the last ITV idents to include the region's name onscreen. ITV1 Wales also had a full selection of idents for a time, before they switched to using the standard ITV1 idents with 'Wales' added during the live television feed.

Only two of the four ITV parent companies adopted any part of the look:

- Most ITV plc regions adopted the full look, but they dropped it in November.
- Channel Television adapted the look by using the logo and music, but replaced the emotional images with pictures of the islands. By this time, they had dropped the 1999 comets logo, replacing it with the yellow ITV1 logo, with the name 'Channel Television' underneath.
- UTV did not adopt the look, instead opting for their in-house created landscapes look.
- The SMG regions of Scottish Television and Grampian Television used combined STV branding from May 2006, with idents featuring people across Scotland passing each other a large blue 'S' logo.

=== November 2006: "Second Phase" ===
ITV1 logo used from 13 November 2006 to 8 April 2010

ITV plc logo used from 16 January 2006 to 13 January 2013

The next presentation of ITV1 was launched on 13 November 2006, just 10 months after the last new look. Following the issues with the previous design, the themes were slightly adjusted: the logo retained the same shape and style, but the letters "ITV" were changed to black to contrast better with the yellow of the logo. This look also introduced another change for regional idents for the ITV plc-owned stations; the regional names were now only used leading into the regional news.

The ident films themselves were scrapped, and a new set was created following the theme of "Alive with Colour," with ITV promoting the new idents as the "second phase" of the look introduced in January. The idents, based on the previous set by Red Bee Media, were designed by The Mill and produced by Blink Productions and Pleix. They featured surreal scenes with yellow colours, accompanied by the same audio track. The look launched with six idents: 'Beach,' 'Bike,' 'Lake,' 'Market,' 'Basketball,' and 'Pavement Art,' with an additional four ('Bubbles,' 'Garden,' 'Buildings,' and 'Fountains') added on 3 September 2007, running in tandem with the previous ones. These latest idents included an ITV1 logo that was larger than the one launched in 2006 but retained the same soundtrack.

Modified ITV1 logo used from 9 April 2010 to 13 January 2013

In April 2010, ITV1 HD was launched, featuring an updated, glossier logo based on that of ITV1. In response, ITV1 changed its logo to the glossier version and launched another four idents: 'Sunflowers,' 'Lanterns,' 'Snakes and Ladders,' and 'Dodgems.' These latest idents were noticeably different from their predecessors: the logo was once again larger and faded in parts. They also featured individual soundtracks based on those used previously, and the style of the idents, particularly the shooting technique, was very different from earlier ones. The idents were accompanied on-screen by updated programme promotions, end-credit promotions, stings, and break bumpers.

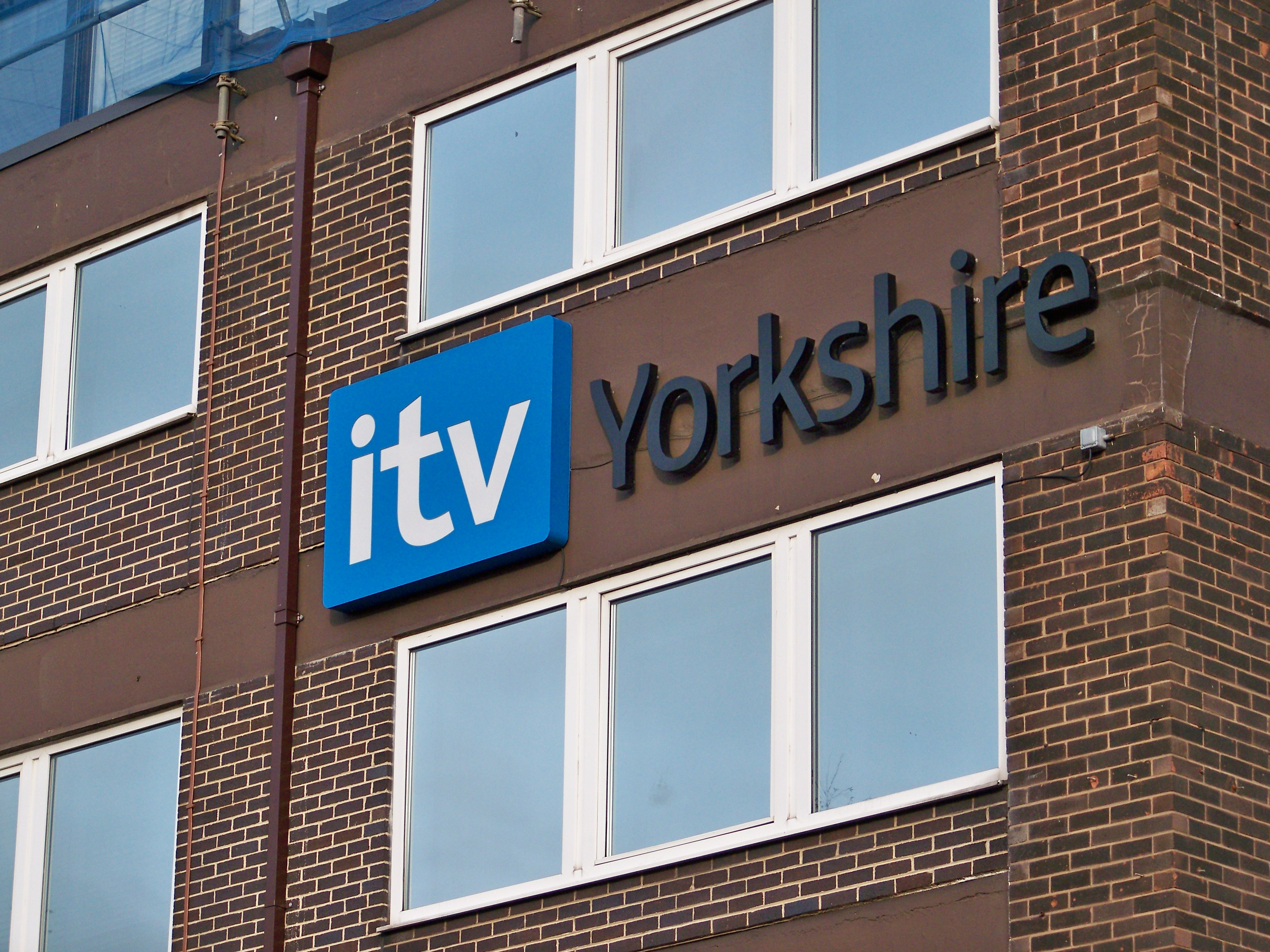
The 2006–13 ITV Yorkshire logo displayed on The Leeds Studios (December 2009)

Due to these changes, all the idents were updated with the new logo, including making it larger in many places. However, the soundtracks remained the same, leading some to question why the other idents weren't updated with the new look.

A paper lantern-themed ident, entitled 'Lanterns', first aired in April 2010 but was withdrawn in August 2010 after the National Farmers' Union criticised ITV for the dangers posed by paper lanterns. However, it was later returned for 13 days in January 2013 before the channel was rebranded.

This package was only seen in some areas of the ITV network:

- Most ITV plc regions adopted the look.
- UTV did not adopt the look, instead opting for their in-house produced postcard idents featuring Northern Ireland landscapes.
- The STV Group regions, Scottish Television and Grampian Television, continued their STV "S" idents until launching a new triangular logo in 2009 with a new set of idents featuring people and places around Scotland with a 'flicker-style approach'.
- Channel Television only used it for national programming and continued with the January 2006 look, using their own landscape pictures before regional programming. However, the new logo did appear on some network promotions on the station, due to their network link from ITV Meridian being 'unclean'. From 2011, all regional programmes were preceded by new idents featuring the 2010 ITV1 logo, following ITV plc's purchase of Channel Television from the Yattendon Group, but this was soon discontinued.

The ITV plc regions, the only regions to adopt the look, dropped it in 2013 in favour of a complete overhaul.

== 2013 - present ==
A five-colour version of the ITV channel logo from 2013 to 2018

=== 2013 ITV plc rebrand ===
On 15 November 2012, it was announced that ITV1 would receive a rebrand in January 2013, reverting to its old name of ITV. A new "curvy" logo was introduced, along with new idents and a presentation package. This was first implemented on 14 January 2013.

Also on 14 January 2013, ITV1 +1 and ITV1 HD were rebranded as ITV +1 and ITV HD, respectively. Meanwhile, sister channels ITV2, ITV3, ITV4, and CITV all received new idents and presentation based on the new corporate logo. Two new channels, ITV Encore (launched in June 2014) and ITVBe (launched in October 2014), also adopted the 2013 ITV logo and joined the sister channels.

ITV's new idents were created to reflect the "everyday life of the Great British public". New idents were introduced on a consistent basis to represent the four seasons – Spring, Summer, Autumn, and Winter. Additionally, the new ITV logo changes colour in each ident, a process known as "colour picking", where each segment of the logo adopts the colour of whatever passes behind it.

This package was only seen on the ITV plc regions. UTV started using the look when ITV plc bought the channel in February 2016 and relaunched it on 17 October 2016 to match ITV's 2013 branding.

=== 2014 STV rebrand ===
STV logo introduced in 2014

Alongside the launch of local TV channel STV Glasgow, on 2 June 2014 STV Group launched new branding, designed by DixonBaxi, in their two STV regions and across the wider business. The existing logo was "dimensionalised" and given "elements of light on the edges of the triangle". The branding was described as having a "contemporary feel of seamless movement and fluidity".

A three-colour version of the ITV channel logo used from 2019 to 2022

=== 2019: "ITV Creates" ===
In December 2018, ITV announced a new project, ITV Creates, which would form the basis of its idents beginning on 1 January 2019. The network would commission artwork featuring the ITV logo from British artists, which would be used as the foundation for a new set of idents each week. The first eight artists involved in the project were Ravi Deepres, Sutapa Biswas, James Brunt, Patricia Volk, Mark Titchner, Katrina Russell Adams, Kristina Veasey, and James Alec Hardy.

ITV Creative Executive Creative Director Tony Pipes explained that the project was intended to serve as a platform for British visual artists, reflect ITV's position as an "endlessly creative" broadcaster, and challenge the traditional notion of idents as a static theme used for long-term periods.

=== 2022: "Multiverse" ===
Logos introduced 15 November 2022

On 15 November 2022, all five of ITV plc's channels underwent a rebranding to coincide with the launch of ITVX, featuring new logos and idents created by the agencies DixonBaxi and Coffee & TV, respectively. All five channels adopted idents with the theme of a "multiverse", depicting different scenes in common locations that reflect each channel's programming output and image. For the first time since 2013, ITV was renamed back to "ITV1" (a name first introduced in 2001).

== See also ==
- History of BBC television idents
