= Broadcasting Act =

Stock short title used for legislation

Broadcasting Act (with its variations) is a stock short title used for legislation in Australia, Canada, Hong Kong, Malaysia, the Republic of Ireland and the United Kingdom that relates to broadcasting. The Bill for an Act with this short title will usually have been known as a Broadcasting Bill during its passage through Parliament.

Broadcasting Acts may be a generic name either for legislation bearing that short title or for all legislation which relates to broadcasting.

== List ==
=== Australia ===
- Broadcasting Act 1942
- Broadcasting Services Act 1992

=== Canada ===
- The Canadian Radio Broadcasting Act, 1932 which established the Canadian Radio Broadcasting Commission.
- The Broadcasting Act, 1958, that took the private-sector regulatory function of the Canadian Broadcasting Corporation, the public broadcaster and created the Board of Broadcast Governors, a separate regulatory agency for private broadcasters.
- The Broadcasting Act, 1968, that established the Canadian Radio-television Telecommunications Commission with oversight over both public and private broadcasting, and updated the mandate of the Canadian Broadcasting Corporation
- The Broadcasting Act, 1991, that amended both the Broadcasting Act, 1968, and the since-separated Canadian Radio-television and Telecommunications Act, 1976

=== Hong Kong ===
- The Broadcasting Ordinance 2000

=== Malaysia ===
- The Broadcasting Act 1988

=== Republic of Ireland ===
- The Broadcasting (Amendment) Act 2007

=== Singapore ===
- Broadcasting Act (Singapore)

=== United Kingdom ===
Letter from Wyn Roberts to Secretary of State for Wales, Nicholas Edwards, Baron Crickhowell regarding the Fourth Channel, August 9, 1980.

Act	Notes
Marine, &c., Broadcasting (Offences) Act 1967	
Sound Broadcasting Act 1972	This act established commercial radio (ILR) to be legal in the United Kingdom.
Sound Broadcasting Act 1972	The Independent Television Authority became the Independent Broadcasting Authority.
Independent Broadcasting Authority Act 1973; Repealed by the Broadcasting Act 1981.	This act consolidated the Television Act 1964 and Sound Broadcasting Act 1972.
Independent Broadcasting Authority Act 1974; Repealed by the Broadcasting Act 1981.	
Independent Broadcasting Authority (No. 2) Act 1974; Repealed by the Broadcasting Act 1980.	This act extended the IBA to provide commercial television and radio from 31st July 1976 to 31st July 1979.
Independent Broadcasting Authority Act 1978; Repealed the Broadcasting Act 1981.	This act extended the IBA to provide commercial television and radio until 31 December 1981.
Independent Broadcasting Authority Act 1979; Repealed by the Broadcasting Act 1980.	
Broadcasting Act 1980; Repealed the Broadcasting Act 1981.	This act extended the IBA to provide commercial television and radio until 31 December 1996.
Broadcasting Act 1980; Repealed the Broadcasting Act 1981.	Creation of the Fourth UK television service (Channel 4 and S4C) and Broadcasting Complaints Commission.
Broadcasting Act 1980; Repealed the Broadcasting Act 1981.	Repealed Independent Broadcasting Authority (No. 2) Act 1974 and Independent Broadcasting Authority Act 1979.
Broadcasting Act 1981; Repealed by the Broadcasting Act 1990.	This act consolidated the Independent Broadcasting Authority Acts 1973, 1974, 1978 and Broadcasting Act 1980.
Cable and Broadcasting Act 1984; Repealed by the Broadcasting Act 1990.	This act established the Cable Authority and made cable television legal in the United Kingdom.
Broadcasting Act 1987; Repealed by the Broadcasting Act 1990.	
Broadcasting Act 1990	That largely deregulated private television, allowed for the creation of a fifth terrestrial television channel as well as allowed for the launch of satellite television in the UK
Broadcasting Act 1996	

== See also ==
- List of short titles
- Communications Act
- The Television Act 1954, Television Act 1963, Television Act 1964
