= 1988–1994 British broadcasting voice restrictions =

Partial ban on voices of specific speakers

Broadcast ban

Government of the United Kingdom
- Territorial extent: England, Wales, Scotland and Northern Ireland
- Enacted by: Douglas Hurd
- Enacted: 19 October 1988
- Commenced: 19 October 1988
- Repealed: 16 September 1994
- Administered by: Home Office

Related legislation
- Broadcasting Act 1981

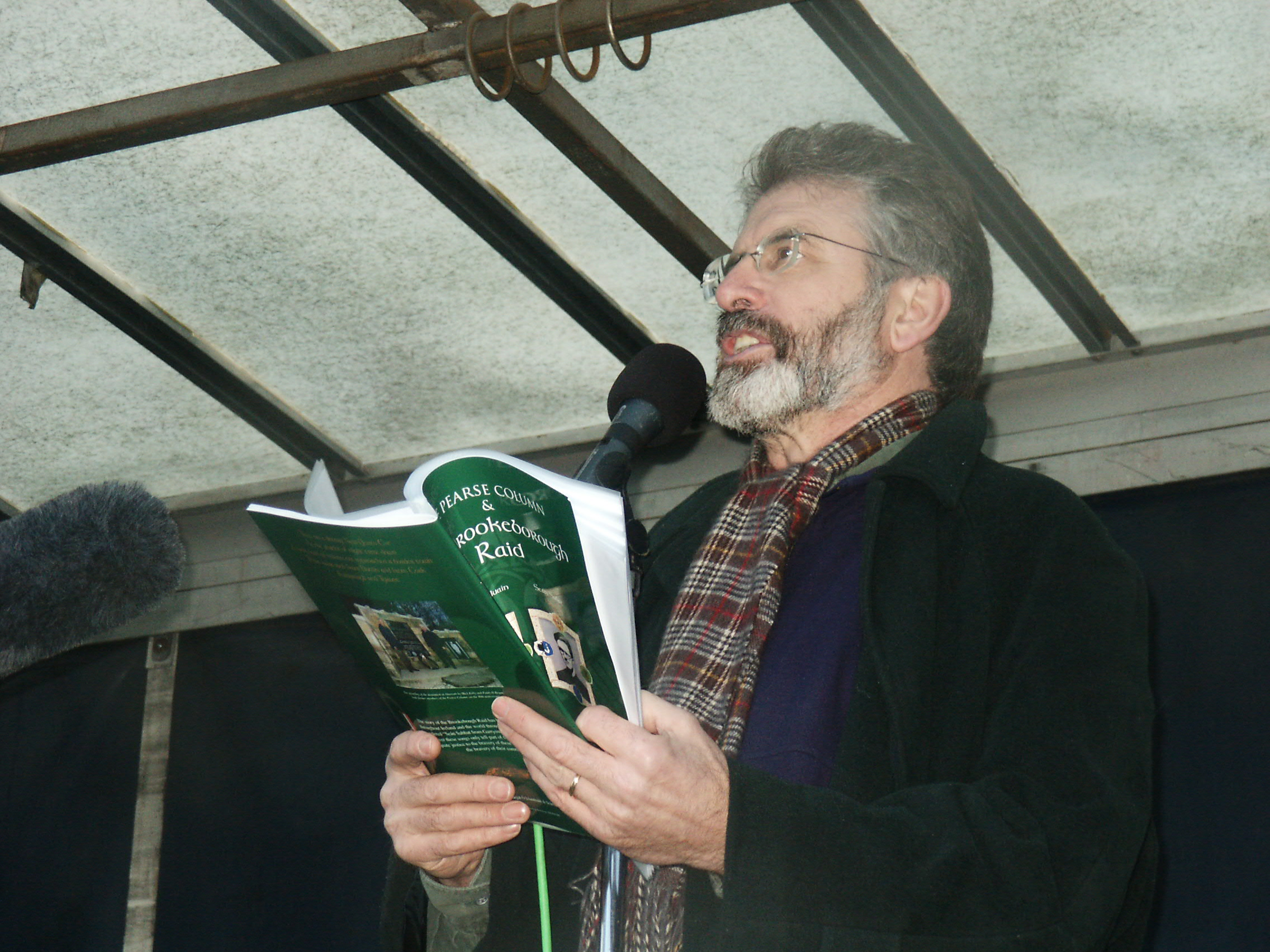
Gerry Adams, Sinn Féin president (seen here in 2001) – one of the people affected by the restrictions enacted in 1988.

From October 1988 to September 1994 the British government banned broadcasts of the voices of representatives from Sinn Féin and ten other Irish republican and loyalist groups on television and radio in the United Kingdom. The restrictions, announced by the Home Secretary, Douglas Hurd, on 19 October 1988, followed a heightened period of violence in the course of the Troubles, and reflected the UK government's belief in a need to prevent these groups from using the media for political advantage.

Broadcasters quickly found ways around the ban, chiefly by using actors to dub the voices of speakers from banned organisations. The legislation did not apply during election campaigns and under certain other circumstances. The restrictions caused difficulties for British journalists who spoke out against censorship imposed by various other countries, such as by Iraq and India. Ireland had its own similar legislation dating from 1971 that banned anyone with links to paramilitary groups from the airwaves. When this restriction lapsed in January 1994, it increased pressure on the British government to abandon its policy; John Major lifted the broadcast ban on 16 September 1994, a fortnight after the first Provisional Irish Republican Army ceasefire (declared on 31 August 1994).

== Background ==
Throughout the Troubles, UK broadcasters were regularly required to stop or postpone the broadcast of documentaries and other programmes relating to Ireland. One of the most prominent instances of this was the 1985 Real Lives documentary for the BBC, At the Edge of the Union. The programme featured extensive footage of Sinn Féin's Martin McGuinness and the Democratic Unionist Party's Gregory Campbell discussing the Troubles, and following direct intervention by the government it was temporarily blocked from being aired. The incident led to a one-day strike by members of the National Union of Journalists, who walked out in protest that the BBC's independence was being undermined.

The months leading up to the introduction of the ban had also seen a particularly intense period of Troubles-related violence, particularly during March 1988. One of the bloodiest episodes of that time was the Ballygawley bus bombing in August, which killed eight British soldiers and injured 28 others. Another incident, the killing of two off-duty British soldiers who drove into an IRA funeral procession on March 19, brought the media into conflict with the government after journalists present at the funeral declined a Royal Ulster Constabulary request to hand over footage of the incident amid concerns doing so would put them at risk. In response the Prime Minister, Margaret Thatcher, told the House of Commons journalists had a "bounden duty" to assist with the investigation. "Either one is on the side of justice in these matters or one is on the side of terrorism". Film was subsequently seized from the BBC and ITN under the Prevention of Terrorism and Emergency Provisions Acts.

The Conservative government believed there was a need for it to act to prevent Sinn Féin from using the media to defend the actions of the IRA, and the measures were part of a wider government response to the increase in violence, which also included changes to the right to silence and the tightening of rules allowing paramilitary prisoners early release. Further controversy also erupted in September 1988 over an intended edition of the Channel 4 discussion programme After Dark which was to have featured the Sinn Féin president, Gerry Adams, as a guest. The show was dropped after the conservative academic Paul Wilkinson – a professor at Aberdeen University who specialised in the study of terrorism and political violence – voiced strong objections to its transmission.

== The ban ==
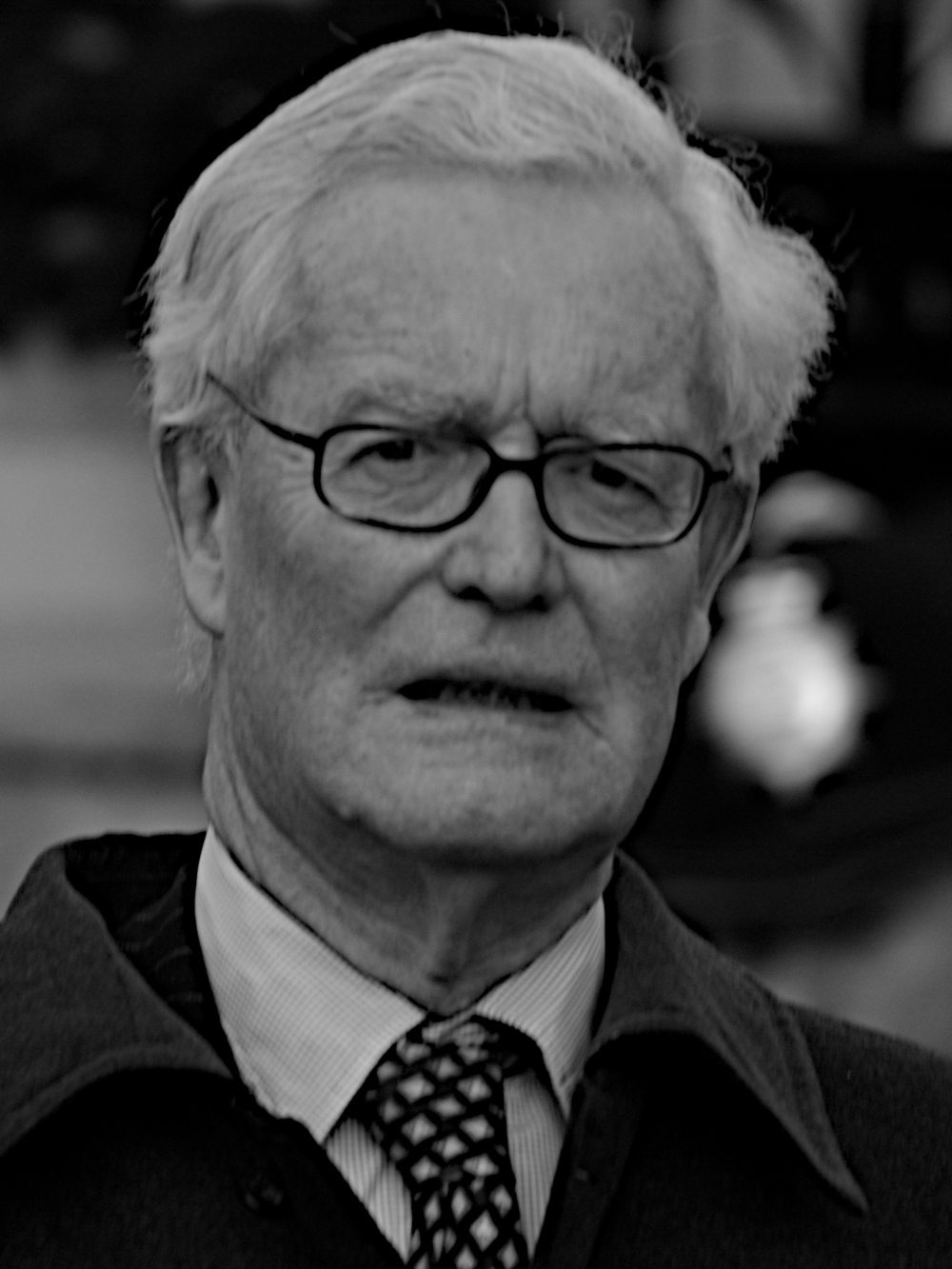
Douglas Hurd, seen here in 2007, introduced the measures in October 1988.

On 19 October 1988, the Home Secretary, Douglas Hurd, issued a notice under clause 13(4) of the BBC Licence and Agreement to the BBC and under section 29(3) of the Broadcasting Act 1981 to the Independent Broadcasting Authority prohibiting the broadcast of direct statements by representatives or supporters of eleven Irish political and military organisations. The ban prevented the UK news media from broadcasting the voices, though not the words, of ten Irish republican and Ulster loyalist paramilitary groups, as well as Sinn Féin. Among the other groups affected were the Provisional IRA, Irish National Liberation Army, Ulster Defence Association and the Ulster Volunteer Force, although the ban was targeted primarily at Sinn Féin. Addressing the House of Commons on the ban, Hurd said, "the terrorists themselves draw support and sustenance from access to radio and television ... the time has come to deny this easy platform to those who use it to propagate terrorism", while the Conservative Prime Minister, Margaret Thatcher, said it would "deny terrorists the oxygen of publicity".

The 1981 Act allowed the Home Secretary to introduce measures in the event of a public interest issue. A parliamentary debate was not required, though Hurd acquiesced to one, and the issue was discussed in the House of Commons on 2 November 1988. The opposition Labour Party introduced an amendment condemning the government's decision as "incompatible with a free society", but it was rejected, despite some Conservative MPs voting with Labour. The legislation was condemned by the National Council for Civil Liberties. The National Union of Journalists planned a one-day strike in protest at the ban for 10 November, but the action was called off after its members failed to reach consensus. A group of broadcast journalists subsequently launched a legal challenge to overturn the ban, but in May 1989 the High Court decided the Home Secretary had acted lawfully. A later hearing at the Appeal Court upheld that decision in December 1989.

Hurd's belief was that the ban would place the print and broadcast media on a level footing, but opponents of the restrictions argued they were affecting the quality of news reporting from Northern Ireland, and consequently people's understanding of the issues. The broadcaster Scarlett McGwire, one of those to challenge the regulations, said in 1989, "The case is not just about journalists and being able to report Northern Ireland properly. It is about people not being able to understand what is happening there because it is not reported properly". Marmaduke Hussey, Chairman of the BBC, called the ban a "very dangerous precedent". A petition organised by the Campaign for Press and Broadcasting Freedom, and including the signatures of 50 MPs, was presented at 10 Downing Street on the first anniversary of its commencement.

== Implementation ==
Media outlets were usually left to interpret the restrictions in their own way, and the ban's remit was at first applied retroactively to archive material, though this was later relaxed following government advice. (Note: "Channel 4 took the ban two stages further, however. It would, its lawyers said, cover 'works of fiction, whatever their provenance or theme' and the ban was also to be as retrospective as the historical development of technology allowed.") In 2005 John Birt, a former Director-General of the BBC, said Hurd's announcement came "right out of the blue", while Danny Morrison, who in 1988 was director of publicity for Sinn Féin, spoke of the total confusion that resulted. "I asked television and radio journalists, 'what can be done?'" Subtitling was initially used, but one of the main ways the new law was circumvented was by substituting the voices of actors for those who could not speak directly. The BBC and its commercial counterparts compiled a list of actors who could be called upon to record voiceovers for news items and documentaries about the Troubles, often at short notice. The actors frequently spoke the words in real time along with the person whose voice was being dubbed. One such interview with Gerry Adams once appeared on the US CNN network without anyone realising they were hearing an actor speak.

The restrictions were also applied to television drama, documentary and discussion programmes. In December 1988 the Secretary of State for Northern Ireland, Tom King, ordered Channel 4 to cancel an episode of the US drama series Lou Grant that featured the story of a fictional IRA gunrunner, even though it had aired previously. Mother Ireland, a 1988 documentary about women and Irish nationalism that included an interview with Mairéad Farrell, subsequently shot dead during an SAS operation in Gibraltar, was also initially banned. When screened by Channel 4 during a season about censorship in April 1991, Farrell's words on republicanism were re-dubbed. On a later occasion, the appearance of the political activist Bernadette Devlin McAliskey on an edition of the BBC's Nation discussing reasons for political violence was also censored when much of what she said was subtitled.

The ban was sometimes interpreted as also applying to historical figures. An example of this occurred in 1990, when the voice of the former Taoiseach and President of Ireland Éamon de Valera was removed from a schools television documentary on Channel 4, due to de Valera – who died in 1975 – having been President of Sinn Féin from 1917 to 1926.

County Sound, a radio station in Surrey, dropped an interview with Errol Smalley, a campaigner for the Guildford Four, although he made a later appearance after overturning the decision. In November 1988, "Streets of Sorrow/Birmingham Six" – a song by The Pogues expressing support for the Birmingham Six and Guildford Four – was subject to the regulations because it included "general disagreement with the way in which the British government responds to, and the courts deal with, the terrorist threat in the UK".

However, the ban was not always enforced. Restrictions were briefly lifted during the 1992 general election, allowing a political debate between the Sinn Féin president Gerry Adams and the Social Democratic and Labour Party leader John Hume to be heard during the election campaign, but the ban resumed once the polls were closed, even preventing Adams' reaction to the loss of his parliamentary seat from being directly aired. An individual's real voice could also be broadcast if the news item in question did not directly relate to their political beliefs or paramilitary activities. Similarly, anyone subject to the restrictions who was an eyewitness to an event or incident could be heard. In February 1992, the voice of Gerard McGuigan, a Sinn Féin councillor, was broadcast when he spoke about an attack on his house by the Ulster Defence Association. Adams was also allowed to speak about a similar attack against his property. On another occasion, the journalist Peter Taylor was given access to inmates at the Maze Prison for a documentary about the jail, but while the prisoners were allowed to speak freely about their personal lives, a complaint by the IRA prisoners' food spokesman concerning the size of the prison's sausage rolls had to be revoiced. In 2005, Francis Welch, a television producer, described the incident as one that highlighted "the surreal nature of the restrictions".

In 1994, a sketch in The Day Today comedy series by Armando Iannucci and Chris Morris parodied the restrictions, with Steve Coogan impersonating a Gerry Adams-esque Sinn Féin leader, spouting rhetoric while inhaling helium to "subtract credibility from his statement".

== Lifting of regulations ==
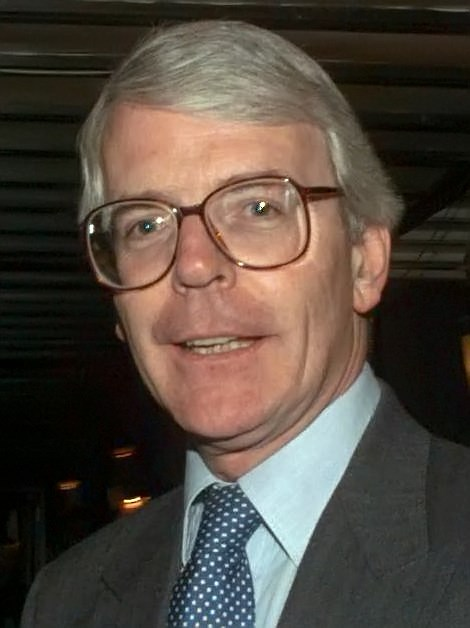
Prime Minister John Major lifted the restrictions in 1994.

Thatcher's successor as Prime Minister, John Major, announced a review of the regulations in November 1993, telling the House of Commons that the general belief within the Conservative Party was that interviews with those subject to the restrictions were being stretched "to the limit and perhaps beyond". His decision followed a television interview with Gerry Adams, which a Conservative MP, Jill Knight, described as having caused "offence to a great number of people". Conservative backbenchers and unionist MPs wanted more rigid restrictions, and The Irish Times reported a "widespread feeling" that Major favoured a complete ban, but that journalists were opposed to this. It quoted the BBC's John Simpson, who said that reporting events from Northern Ireland would become "virtually impossible". At that time coverage of Northern Ireland-related topics was becoming more frequent with the increasing pace of the peace process. The review was conducted by the Secretary of State for Heritage, Peter Brooke. In February 1994, Major's government decided to maintain the status quo.

Pressure to reverse the restrictions grew after the statutory instruments of Section 31 of the Irish government's Broadcasting Authority Act 1960 were allowed to lapse in January 1994. These had prohibited radio and television interviews with representatives of paramilitary groups and Sinn Féin (see: Censorship in the Republic of Ireland). From that point, anyone in Northern Ireland with access to the Republic of Ireland's state broadcaster, RTÉ, could hear the voices of anyone still banned from the airwaves by the UK regulations. Responding to the Dublin government's decision, Gerry Adams said, "Over 20 years of political censorship has served to stunt any hopes of a resolution of the conflict. It has denied the right of information. Good riddance." The regulations particularly came under the spotlight during a visit Adams made to the United States in 1994, where he gave a speech that was widely broadcast around the world, but had to be dubbed in the UK because of the ban. In May 1994 the National Union of Journalists launched a legal challenge with the European Commission of Human Rights, seeking to take the British government to court for breach of freedom of expression under the European Convention of Human Rights, but the case was rejected. A similar challenge brought against the Irish government in 1991 over its broadcast ban had also been thrown out.

The UK ban was lifted on 16 September 1994, a fortnight after the first IRA ceasefire was declared. On the same day Major announced that ten roads linking Northern Ireland with the Republic (which had been closed by British security forces) would reopen, and promised any negotiated deal on the future of Northern Ireland's governance would be subject to a referendum. The deputy leader of Sinn Féin, Martin McGuinness, gave his first direct interview to Ulster Television shortly after the restrictions ceased.

The decision to end the ban was welcomed by broadcasters. Michael Grade, who was then chief executive of Channel 4, said it had ended "one of the most embarrassing attempts to censor coverage of the most important domestic political story of post-war years", while John Birt commented, "We can once again apply normal and testing scrutiny to all sides in the debate". Sinn Féin also signalled their approval, but the ban's lifting was viewed with more caution by unionist politicians. Peter Robinson of the Democratic Unionist Party felt the decision was premature while the IRA remained an armed organisation. "It gives de facto recognition to a body of men who still have their guns and bombs under the table, who still reserve the right to murder if they don't get their way".

== Analysis ==
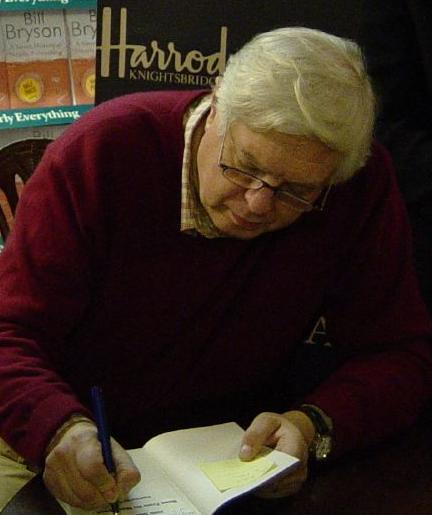
BBC Foreign Correspondent John Simpson encountered difficulties while reporting from Iraq because of the restrictions.

Francis Welch, the producer of Speak No Evil, a 2005 BBC documentary that discusses the restrictions, argued that the legislation "added pressure to the process of reporting events in Northern Ireland", while Sinn Féin's Danny Morrison believed the ban "was a weapon of war used by the government" in an attempt to silence the Republican movement. However, Norman Tebbit, a former Conservative MP who was injured in the Brighton bombing, said that the media was giving Sinn Féin and the IRA "publicity that they shouldn't have had". Peter Robinson of the Democratic Unionist Party argued the use of legislation was "a legitimate weapon for the state to use".

In 1994 Tony Hall, the head of the BBC's News and Current Affairs, argued that the restrictions did not allow viewers to make a proper judgment about those subject to the rules, as the subtle changes to their voices could not be heard. In particular he cited the example of the appearance of Gerry Adams on the BBC's On the Record in September 1993, in which he spoke about the prospect of peace in Northern Ireland. Hall said Adams was nervous and defensive throughout the interview as the presenter, Sheena McDonald, argued that peace could not be achieved while the IRA continued its violent stance, but that viewers were unaware of these aspects of the discussion. He also said that some countries, such as India and Egypt, had quoted the restrictions to BBC journalists who complained about the over use of censorship by authorities in those countries. Additionally Hall argued that Sinn Féin and the IRA had manipulated the ban by using it as an excuse to decline interviews.

The BBC Foreign Affairs Editor John Simpson encountered similar difficulties on the issue of censorship while reporting from Iraq during the Gulf War in 1990–91. "When I worked in Baghdad, officials there always used to mention our Sinn Féin ban if you criticised their censorship. I don't like to see this country appearing on the same side of the dividing line as Saddam Hussein on anything at all." At a conference on the reporting of Northern Ireland-related issues at the University of London in November 1993, chaired by the Irish journalist Mary Holland, several participants claimed it was undermining the practice of investigative reporting.

Research by the Glasgow Media Group indicates that coverage of Sinn Féin by the BBC before the ban was minimal. In 1988 Sinn Féin was only heard or seen on television 93 times, had only 17 of the 633 formal BBC interviews as compared to 121 interviews with the Conservative Party and 172 with the Royal Ulster Constabulary and the civil service, and were never interviewed in the studio like many other participants. However, after the ban there was a steep decline in coverage of Sinn Féin and Republican views, with television appearances being reduced to 34 times in the following year, and the delays and uncertainties caused by ambiguities, voice-overs and subtitles often led to coverage and films being dropped entirely.

== See also ==
- BBC controversies
- Censorship in the United Kingdom
