= Regulations on television programming in Australia =

Australia television programming regulations

Regulations on television programming in Australia are enforced by the Australian Communications and Media Authority to promote programming which reflects Australian identity and cultural diversity. Commercial networks must adhere to content quotas of Australian programming, in the categories of Australian content quotas, children's content quotas, commercial broadcasting quotas, community broadcasting quotas, public broadcasting quotas and subscription television quotas. Regulations are based on the Broadcasting Services Act 1992.

The Australian Federal Government updated its programming requirements with an overhaul of local content quotas in late 2020.

== Types of content quotas ==
=== Australian content quotas ===
The Broadcasting Services Act 1992 requires all commercial free-to-air television licensees to broadcast an annual minimum transmission quota of 55% Australian programming between 6:00am and midnight (12:00am) on their primary channel. Commercial networks must also broadcast 1460 hours of Australian programming yearly on their non-primary channels.

The Government's overhaul of quotas in October 2020 maintained the requirement to produce 55% of Australian content on all primary networks and 1460 hours on non-primary channels. However, sub-quotas on drama, documentary and children's programming were removed; replaced with a points-based system rewarding productions of higher budgets, and limiting the amount of documentary used to meet the requirements. The updated quotas require broadcasters to reach 250 points annually, with a maximum of 50 points allowed for documentaries.

Points-based system for Australian content quotas enforced from 2021 onwards
Genre	Points per hour
Commissioned documentary	1
Commissioned children's content (non-drama)	1.5
Commissioned drama (<$450,000 production budget per hour)	1.5
Commissioned drama ($450,000 to $700,000 production budget per hour)	4
Commissioned drama ($700,000 to $1 million production budget per hour)	5
Commissioned drama ($1 million to $1.4 million production budget per hour)	6
Commissioned drama (>$1.4 million production budget per hour)	7
Acquired Australian film (licence fee less than $50,000)	1
Acquired Australian film (licence fee more than $50,000)	2

=== Streaming services content quotas ===
As of 1 January 2021, Subscription Video on Demand (SVOD) providers operating in Australia are required to report their investment in Australian content to the Australian Communications and Media Authority (ACMA), with no formal requirement to produce local content.

=== Children's content quotas ===
The Children's Television Standards 2009 were published as an amendment to the Broadcasting Services Act 1992, and enforced on 1 January 2010. The standards were implemented for Australian commercial television stations to broadcast a specified minimum amount of children's programming annually. Programs must be classified as either C or P by the ACMA before broadcast; deeming them as specifically appropriate for the needs of children at different ages. These programs differ to series with a G classification, which are aimed at families, but not specifically intended for an audience of children. Classifications for C and P programs last for five years, and any one episode may not be broadcast more than three times throughout this period. (Note: There is no restriction on the number of times a single episode of a C-classified drama series is played.) Each 30 minute broadcast of a C-classified program may not contain more than seven minutes of appropriate advertising, and P-classified programs must be broadcast without any advertisements. Programs must not contain prizes or endorsements for commercial products.

The content quotas on children's programming were enforced in Australia until October 2020, when the Australian Government released an overhaul of local content requirements. The children's sub-quotas were permanently removed, leaving commercial broadcasters with no obligation to produce and air Australian content for children. This followed the quotas being temporarily suspended in April 2020 due to the COVID-19 pandemic. While the requirement to produce children's programming was no longer required, broadcasters were still encouraged to use this genre of production to meet their annual points-based requirements; with the C and P classifications remaining in use for local children's content.

Australian children's content quotas enforced until 2020
Symbol	Abbreviation	Name	Description	Quota (mandated until 2020)	Time band
P-rated (pink)	P	Preschool	Programs deemed to specifically meet the educational needs and interests of preschool children (children who have not started school).	130 hours of P-classified programming each year within a nominated time band. (Note: There is no restriction on the amount of P-classified programs which must be first release, however, a single episode of P program cannot be broadcast more than three times over a five year period.)	Monday to Friday – 7:00am to 4:30pm
C-rated (orange)	C	Children's	Programs deemed to specifically meet the educational needs and interests of children who are younger than 14 and above preschool age.	260 hours of C-classified programming each year within a nominated time band, with at least 50% (130 hours) of first release content. This must include: 25 hours of first release C drama programs. (Note: Networks must broadcast a minimum of 96 hours of first release C drama programs over a period of three years.); 8 hours of non-first release C drama programs.	Monday to Friday – 7:00am to 8:30am; Monday to Friday – 4:00pm to 8:30pm; Saturday, Sunday and school holidays (Note: School holidays are defined as the public holidays and government primary school holidays in the television licence area.) – 7:00am to 8:30pm

== Response to regulations ==
=== Response to Australian quotas ===
In October 2017, the Environment and Communications References Committee of Australia began an inquiry into the viability of Australia's screen and television industry. The "Make it Australian" campaign argued for no cuts to the content quotas to be made, tax incentives for local productions to be raised, and proposed that a new regulation for streaming services such as Netflix and Stan to be implemented. Commercial free-to-air networks Seven Network, Nine Network and Network Ten opposed the campaign and proposed replacing the 55% quota with a new "points" scheme, due to the unsustainable cost of local productions. Denis Muller of The Conversation noted how investment in local content by the Australian Broadcasting Corporation (ABC) and other networks had decreased, due to lack of funding and the rise in prominence of digital platforms.

The obligations to produce Australian drama and documentary programs were suspended in April 2020, due to the COVID-19 pandemic, to offer short-term financial support for the networks. Networks responded by highlighting the urgent need for consultation on the long-term reform for content quotas. The Government updated the local content requirements in October 2020, permanently removing sub-quotas on drama and documentary programs, and adopting a points-based system which would reward the productions of higher budget programming. Screen Producers Australia described the lack of quotas for streaming services as a "lost opportunity", with no requirement for the services to "contribute back to Australian businesses, employment or culture".

=== Inquiry into children's content quotas ===
In 2017, commercial free-to-air networks Seven Network, Nine Network and Network 10 argued that children were no longer watching the C and P-classified programs produced under the Australian content quotas. The executives of the networks requested to be relieved of the quotas which they described as "heavy and restrictive" and "no longer sustainable", while stating that the obligation to produce children's content was a waste of money and resources. Executives noted the change in viewing patterns of children to alternative television services, and suggested that the quotas be abolished and transferred to public broadcasters such as the ABC, who were still experiencing success with their children's programs. The Australian Children's Television Foundation (ACTF) supported the proposal of applying children's quotas to the ABC, complemented with adequate funding to produce quality programming.

The Inquiry into Film and TV found that networks were fulfilling their obligations for children's drama by mainly broadcasting animated series rather than live action programs. The ACTF expressed concern that the animated series were being produced with intentions of worldwide broadcasts, rather than contributing to the development of Australian identity for its local audiences. They noted how the amount of Australian drama for children was declining compared to earlier years. Researchers argued that "international-style" animations went against the original intent of the quotas to support content which was "identifiably Australian". The Inquiry proposed that the sub-quotas be refined with a larger focus on live-action drama.

In February 2020, the Seven Network cancelled production on two of its local children's programs, Get Arty and Get Clever, ahead of the ACMA and Screen Australia releasing their response to the industry inquiry. It was reported that Seven had threatened to discontinue the production of all children's content in protest against the local content quotas. Network executives pleaded for "immediate action" from the government in regards to abandoning the quotas, citing $8 million spent on children's programming in the last calendar year and an average of less than 1,000 viewers for the programs. Screen Producers Australia was not in support of the network's viewpoint, while the ACTF cited programs such as Bluey as examples of quality Australian programming. Despite the halt in production, it was stated that Seven would still meet its content quotas for 2020.

Due to the COVID-19 pandemic, in April 2020, the local content quotas for all Australian programming were suspended for the remainder of the year. In response to the suspension, the Seven Network removed their children's programming from 7two. In May, Seven's executive producer of children's television, Niki Hamilton, left the network and was not replaced. As part of the Federal Government's overhaul of local regulations in October 2020, the sub-quotas for children's content were permanently removed, leaving commercial broadcasters with no further requirement to produce children's programming. In addition to the changes, the Australian Government would also invest $20 million to the ACTF over two years to support production of high quality children's programming. Statements from the Seven Network, Nine Network and Network 10 indicated a favourable response to the update of quotas. Conversely, the Australian Writers' Guild predicted that children's programming would be the "first casualty" of the update, and expected that the ABC and SBS would be left with the responsibility of producing content for children. Screen Producers Australia referred to the overhaul as "the effective abolition of children's content quotas" and suggested it would have a significant negative effect on children's programming production.
