= List of statutory instruments of the United Kingdom, 1957 =

This is an incomplete list of statutory instruments of the United Kingdom in 1957.

== Statutory instruments ==
=== 1-499 ===
- Traffic Signs Regulations and General Directions 1957 (SI 1957/13)
- Airways Corporations (General Stall, Pilots and Officers Pensions) (Amendment) Regulations 1957 (SI 1957/87)
- Visiting Forces Act (Application to Colonies) (Amendment) Order 1957 (SI 1957/103)
- Coal Industry (Superannuation Scheme) (Winding Up, No. 11) Regulations 1957 (SI 1957/156)
- Petroleum-Spirit (Conveyance by Road) Regulations 1957 (SI 1957/191)
- Coal Industry Nationalisation (Superannuation) Regulations 1957 (SI 1957/319)
- Wireless Telegraphy (Control of Interference from Ignition Apparatus) Amendment (No. 1) Regulations 1957 (SI 1957/347)
- Oil in Navigable Waters (Transfer Records) Regulations 1957 (SI 1957/358)
- Transferred Undertakings (Pensions of Employees) (Amendment) Regulations 1957 (SI 1957/438)

=== 500-999 ===
- Colchester Water Order 1957 (SI 1957/552)
- Television Act 1954 (Isle of Man) Order 1957 (SI 1957/602)
- National Health Service (Superannuation) (England and Scotland) (Amendment) Regulations 1957 (SI 1957/788)
- Petroleum (Liquid Methane) Order 1957 (SI 1957/859)
- Merchant Shipping (Registration of Federation of Nigeria Government Ships) Order 1957 (SI 1957/861)
- Motor Vehicles (Construction and Use) (Track Laying Vehicles) (Amendment) (No. 2) Regulations 1957 (SI 1957/972)

=== 1000-1499 ===
- Superannuation (English Local Government and Northern Ireland Civil Service) Interchange Rules 1957 (SI 1957/1155)
- Dearne Valley Water Board Order 1957 (SI 1957/1153)
- Landlord and Tenant (Notices) Regulations 1957 (SI 1957/1157)
- Consular Conventions (Income Tax) (Italian Republic) Order 1957 (SI 1957/1368)
- Consular Conventions (Income Tax) (Federal Republic of Germany), Order 1957 (SI 1957/1369)
- Merchant Shipping (Certificates of Competency as A.B.) (Barbados) Order 1957 (SI 1957/1371)
- Agriculture (Ladders) Regulations 1957 (SI 1957/1385)
- Agriculture (Power Take-off) Regulations 1957 (SI 1957/1386)
- British Transport Commission (Male Wages Grades Pensions) (Amendment) Regulations 1957 (SI 1957/1455)

=== 1500-1999 ===
- Double Taxation Relief (Estate Duty) (Pakistan) Order 1957 (SI 1957/1522)
- Copyright (International Organisations) Order 1957 (SI 1957/1524)
- Superannuation (National Physical Laboratory and Civil Service) Transfer Rules 1957 (SI 1957/1586)
- Justices of the Peace Act 1949 (Compensation) Regulations 1957 (SI 1957/1681)
- Superannuation (Roehampton Hospital and Civil Service) Transfer Rules 1957 (SI 1957/1723)
- North East of Birmingham-Nottingham Trunk Road (Breedon-On-The-Hill Bypass) Order 1957 (SI 1957/1829)
- National Insurance and Industrial Injuries (Israel) Order 1957 (SI 1957/1879)
- Superannuation (Wartime Social Survey and Civil Service) Transfer Rules 1957 (SI 1957/1989)

=== 2000-2499 ===
- Consular Conventions (Federal Republic of Germany) Order 1957 SI 1957/2052)
- Consular Conventions (Italian Republic) Order 1957 (SI 1957/2053)
- Superannuation (English Local Government and Northern Ireland Health Service) Interchange Rules 1957 (SI 1957/2197)
- Census of Distribution (1958) (Restriction on Disclosure) Order 1956 (SI 1957/1860)
- Greenwich Hospital School (Regulations) (Amendment) Order 1956 (SI 1957/1894)
- Merchant Shipping (Certificates of Competency as A.B.) (New Zealand) Order 1956 (SI 1957/1895)
- Coal Mines (Cardox and Hydrox) Regulations 1956 (SI 1957/1942)
- Stratified Ironstone, Shale and Fireclay Mines (Explosives) Regulations 1956 (SI 1957/1943)
- Mines (Manner of Search for Smoking Materials) Order 1956 (SI 1957/2016)
- Visiting Forces (Designation) Order 1956 (SI 1957/2041)
- Visiting Forces (Military Courts-Martial) (Amendment) Order 1956 (SI 1957/2043)
- Visiting Forces (Royal New Zealand Air Force) (Amendment) Order 1956 (SI 1957/2044)
- Sheriffs' Fees (Amendment No. 2) Order 1956 (SI 1957/2081)
- Alkali, &c. Works (Registration) Order (SI 1957/2208)
- Mid-Wessex Water (No. 2) Order 1957 (SI 1957/2233)

== See also ==
- List of statutory instruments of the United Kingdom
