= Broadcasting Act 1980 =

Act of the Parliament of the United Kingdom

Broadcasting Act 1980 (Note: Section 41(1).)
- Act of Parliament
- Parliament of the United Kingdom
- Long title: An Act to amend and supplement the Independent Broadcasting Authority Act 1973 in connection with the provision by the Independent Broadcasting Authority of a second television service and otherwise in connection with the functions of the Authority; to make provision as to the arrangements for the broadcasting of television programmes for reception in Wales, with power to make different provision as to those arrangements by order; to establish a Broadcasting Complaints Commission; and for connected purposes.
- Citation: 1980 c. 64
- Territorial extent: United Kingdom (Note: Section 41(2)–(3).)

Dates
- Royal assent: 13 November 1980
- Commencement: various (Note: Section 41(4)–(5).)
- Repealed: 1 January 1982
Other legislation
Amends	Independent Broadcasting Authority Act 1973; Independent Broadcasting Authority Act 1978
Repeals/revokes	Independent Broadcasting Authority (No. 2) Act 1974; Independent Broadcasting Authority Act 1979
Repealed by	Broadcasting Act 1981

Status: Repealed

Text of statute as originally enacted

Letter from Wyn Roberts to Secretary of State for Wales, Nicholas Edwards, Baron Crickhowell regarding the Fourth Channel, August 9, 1980.

The Broadcasting Act 1980 (c. 64) was an act of the Parliament of the United Kingdom. It was repealed by the Broadcasting Act 1981, though the provisions of the act remained in force.

The most significant effect of the act was to amend the Independent Broadcasting Authority Act 1973, giving the Independent Broadcasting Authority the power to provide a second television station. This began the process which would lead to the creation of Channel 4 in 1982.

It also made provision for the broadcasting of television programmes in Wales, and established the Broadcasting Complaints Commission.

It also allowed the government to take over control of the BBC in a time of national emergency.

== Subsequent developments ==
The whole act was repealed by section 65(4) of, and schedule 9 to, the Broadcasting Act 1981, which came into force on 1 January 1982.

== Bibliography ==
- Whitaker's Almanack: for the year 1982, complete edition, p. 362. J. Whitaker & Sons, London, 1981
