= Export Guarantees and Overseas Investment Act 1978 =

Act of the Parliament of the United Kingdom

Export Guarantees and Overseas Investment Act 1978 (Note: Section 16(1).)
- Act of Parliament
- Parliament of the United Kingdom
- Long title: An Act to consolidate the Export Guarantees Act 1975, (as amended by section 4 of the International Finance, Trade and Aid Act 1977 and Schedule 1 to that Act), and sections 1 and 2 of the Overseas Investment and Export Guarantees Act 1972.
- Citation: 1978 c. 18
- Territorial extent: United Kingdom (Note: Section 16(5).)

Dates
- Royal assent: 30 June 1978
- Commencement: 30 July 1978 (Note: Section 16(4).)
- Repealed: 23 October 1991 (Note: The Export and Investment Guarantees Act 1991 (Commencement) Order 1991 (SI 1991/2430).)

Other legislation
- Amends: See § Repealed enactments
- Repeals/revokes: See § Repealed enactments
- Repealed by: Export and Investment Guarantees Act 1991

Status: Repealed

Text of statute as originally enacted

Revised text of statute as amended

The Export Guarantees and Overseas Investment Act 1978 (c. 18) was an act of the Parliament of the United Kingdom that consolidated enactments relating to export guarantees and overseas investment in the United Kingdom.

== Provisions ==
=== Repealed enactments ===
Section 16(2) of the act repealed 3 enactments, listed in the schedule to the act.

Enactments repealed by section 16(2)
Citation	Short title	Extent of repeal
1972 c. 40	Overseas Investment and Export Guarantees Act 1972	Sections 1 and 2.
1975 c. 38	Export Guarantees Act 1975	The whole act.
1977 c. 6	International Finance, Trade and Aid Act 1977	Section 4.
1977 c. 6	International Finance, Trade and Aid Act 1977	Schedule 1.

== Subsequent developments ==
The whole act was repealed by section 15(4) of the Export and Investment Guarantees Act 1991, which came into force on 23 October 1991.
