= Export Guarantees Act 1968 =

Act of the Parliament of the United Kingdom

Export Guarantees Act 1968 (Note: Section 11(1).)
- Act of Parliament
- Parliament of the United Kingdom
- Long title: An Act to consolidate the Export Guarantees Acts 1949 to 1967 as amended by the National Loans Act 1968.
- Citation: 1968 c. 26
- Territorial extent: United Kingdom

Dates
- Royal assent: 30 May 1968
- Commencement: 30 May 1968 (Note: The Acts of Parliament (Commencement) Act 1793.)
- Repealed: 3 August 1975
Other legislation
Amends	See § Repealed enactments
Repeals/revokes	See § Repealed enactments
Amended by	Export Guarantees and Payments Act 1970; Overseas Investment and Export Guarantees Act 1972; Export Guarantees Amendment Act 1975
Repealed by	Export Guarantees Act 1975

Status: Repealed

Text of statute as originally enacted

The Export Guarantees Act 1968 (c. 26) was an act of the Parliament of the United Kingdom that consolidated enactments relating to export guarantees in the United Kingdom.

== Provisions ==
=== Repealed enactments ===
Section 11(2) of the act repealed 6 enactments, listed in that section.

Citation	Short title	Extent of repeal
12, 13 & 14 Geo. 6. c. 14	Export Guarantees Act 1949	The whole act.
14 & 15 Geo. 6. c. 17	Export Guarantees Act 1951	The whole act.
5 & 6 Eliz. 2. c. 23	Export Guarantees Act 1957	The whole act.
1964 c. 6	Export Guarantees Act 1964	The whole act.
1967 c. 11	Export Guarantees Act 1967	The whole act.
1968 c. 13	National Loans Act 1968	In section 10, subsections (4)(a) and (5).

== Subsequent developments ==
The whole act was repealed by section 12(2) of the Export Guarantees Act 1975, which came into force on 3 August 1975.
