= Television Act 1954 =

Act of the Parliament of the United Kingdom creating ITV

Television Act 1954 (Note: Section 20(1).)
- Act of Parliament
- Parliament of the United Kingdom
- Long title: An Act to make provision for television broadcasting services in addition to those provided by the British Broadcasting Corporation, and to set up a special authority for that purpose; to make provision as to the constitution, powers, duties and financial resources of that authority and as to the position and obligations of persons contracting with that authority for the provision of programmes and parts of programmes; and for purposes connected with the matters aforesaid.
- Citation: 2 & 3 Eliz. 2. c. 55
- Territorial extent: England and Wales; Scotland; Northern Ireland; Isle of Man (Note: The Television Act 1954 (Isle of Man) Order 1957 (SI 1957/602).); Channel Islands (Note: The Television Act 1954 (Channel Islands) Order 1961 (SI 1961/2039).); (Note: Section 20(2)–(3).)

Dates
- Royal assent: 30 July 1954
- Commencement: 30 July 1954 (Note: The Acts of Parliament (Commencement) Act 1793.)
- Repealed: 24 October 1961
Other legislation
| Amended by | Television Act 1963 |
| Repealed by | Television Act 1964 |

Status: Repealed

Text of statute as originally enacted

The Television Act 1954 (2 & 3 Eliz. 2. c. 55) was an act of the Parliament of the United Kingdom which permitted the creation of the first commercial television network in the United Kingdom, ITV.

Until the early 1950s, the only television service in Britain was operated as a monopoly by the British Broadcasting Corporation, and financed by the annual television licence fee payable by each household which contained one or more television sets. The new Conservative government elected in 1951 wanted to create a commercial television channel, but this was a controversial subject—the only other examples of commercial television were to be found in the United States, and it was widely considered that the commercial television found there was "vulgar".

The solution to the problem was to create the Independent Television Authority which would closely regulate the new commercial channel in the interests of good taste, and award franchises to commercial companies for fixed terms.

The first commercial franchises were awarded in 1954, and commercial television started broadcasting in stages between 1955 and 1962. The first advertisement aired by ITV promoted Gibbs SR toothpaste at 8:12pm on 22 September 1955. Household cleaners were the most frequently advertised products over the 1955–1960 period.

== Subsequent developments ==
Television Act 1954 (Isle of Man) Order 1957 (Note: Section 2.)
- Statutory Instrument
- Parliament of the United Kingdom
- Citation: SI 1957/602
- Territorial extent: United Kingdom

Dates
- Made: 5 April 1957
- Commencement: 5 April 1957
Other legislation
| Made under | Television Act 1954 |
| Revoked by | Television Act 1964 (Isle of Man) Order 1965 |

Status: Revoked

Text of statute as originally enacted

Television Act 1954 (Channel Islands) Order 1961 (Note: Section 4.)
- Statutory Instrument
- Parliament of the United Kingdom
- Citation: SI 1961/2039
- Territorial extent: United Kingdom

Dates
- Made: 24 October 1961
- Commencement: 24 October 1961
Other legislation
| Made under | Television Act 1954 |
| Revoked by | Television Act 1964 (Channel Islands) Order 1964 |

Status: Revoked

Text of statute as originally enacted

The act was extended to the Isle of Man by the Television Act 1954 (Isle of Man) Order 1957 (SI 1957/602) and to the Channel Islands by the Television Act 1954 (Channel Islands) Order 1961 (SI 1961/2039).

The whole at was repealed by section 29(1) of the Television Act 1964, which came into force on 31 July 1964.

== Bibliography ==
- Lloyd, Dennis (1958). "Some Comments on the British Television Act, 1954". Law and Contemporary Problems. 23 (1): 165–174. doi:10.2307/1190268. JSTOR 1190268.
- "1954 Television Act". Transdiffusion.
