= Broadcasting Services Act 1992 =

Act of the Parliament of Australia

Parliament of Australia
- Long title: An Act relating to broadcasting services, broadcasting video on demand services, datacasting services, online services and content services, and for related purposes
- Citation: No. 110, 1992 as amended or No. 110 of 1992
- Territorial extent: Australia
- Assented to: 14 July 1992
- Status: Amended

The Broadcasting Services Act 1992 (Cth) is an Act of the Parliament of Australia, which broadly covers issues relating to content regulation and media ownership in Australia.

== Background ==
Prior to the Act, the primary legislation in regulating Australia's broadcasting services was the Broadcasting Act 1942. The ancestral Act was restrictive to the content and ownership of commercial radio and thus was successively amended to accommodate for the introduction of privately owned television networks. The ad hoc approach to legislating broadcasting regulations was reviewed by parliament in 1988 leading to the drafting of the current Act.

Meanwhile, Australia's restrictions on foreign investment were eased during the 1980s leading to significant investment in Australia's private sector. Restrictions were, however, still in place for Australian radio and television broadcasters. Australian television networks of Nine Network and Seven Network sought foreign equity in early 1990 but had been limited by restrictions on foreign ownership within the ancestral Act.

== The Act ==
The legislation aims to regulate the availability and content of Australian broadcasting services including television, radio, and online platforms. The key objectives of the legislation include:

- Promoting a diverse range of entertainment, education, and information content.
- Providing the Australian market for broadcasting services with increased regulation to maintain competitive and responsive content.
- Ensuring the availability of significant local content in regional areas.
- Preventing harmful material being exposed to children.
- Providing a means for consumer complaints regarding internet content.

Broadcasting services are defined as any 'service that delivers television programs or radio programs' to consumers. This excludes services that involve 'no more than data, or no more than text' as well as 'point-to-point' services such as dial-up internet.

=== The Authority ===
The Australian Communications and Media Authority (ACMA), formerly the Australian Broadcasting Authority, was established by the Act. It was given the express purpose to regulate broadcasting licenses for commercial television and radio, and "...[enable] public interest considerations...", whilst "...not [imposing] unnecessary financial and administrative burdens on providers of broadcasting services".

ACMA is provided with the role of ensuring all industry codes of practice for broadcasting regulation comply with the objectives of the Act, and if industry self-regulation fails to provide adequate protections, the authority then intervenes to develop new codes of practice.

=== Election blackout periods ===
From the end of Wednesday on an election year until the close of polls on the relevant polling day, which must always be on a Saturday. Online media sources such as text messages, email communications, streaming media such as Netflix and YouTube, and newspapers and other forms of print media are exempt. The relevant part of the Broadcasting Services Act 1992 that specifies this provision is schedule two.

=== Content quotas ===
The Act stipulates a local content quota for regional broadcasters regulated by the ACMA. The system allocates points based on the number of minutes of content broadcast which relates directly to a local area or area in which a broadcasting license is held. 'Material of local significance' includes content on individuals, places, organisations, events, and issues pertaining to respective communities.

Point System Allocation
Item	Material	Points for each minute of material
1	News that: (a) is broadcast during an eligible period by a licensee covered by subsection 61CW(1) or 61CX(1); and (b) has not previously been broadcast to the local area during an eligible period; and (c) depicts people, places or things in the local area; and (d) meets such other requirements (if any) as are set out in the local programming determination.	3
2	News that: (a) is broadcast during an eligible period; and (b) has not previously been broadcast to the local area during an eligible period; and (c) relates directly to the local area; and (d) is not covered by item 1.	2
3	Other material that: (a) is broadcast during an eligible period; and (b) except in the case of a community service announcement—has not previously been broadcast to the local area during an eligible period; and (c) relates directly to the local area.	1
4	News that: (a) is broadcast during an eligible period; and (b) has not previously been broadcast to the local area during an eligible period; and (c) relates directly to the licensee's licence area.	1
5	Other material that: (a) is broadcast during an eligible period; and (b) except in the case of a community service announcement—has not previously been broadcast to the local area during an eligible period; and (c) relates directly to the licensee's licence area.	1

Regional broadcasters must receive either:

- 90 points per week or;
- 720 points in a period of six weeks.

Regional broadcasting license areas include:

- Northern New South Wales TV1;
- Southern New South Wales TV1;
- Regional Victoria TV1;
- Eastern Victoria TV1;
- Western Victoria TV1;
- Regional Queensland TV1;
- Tasmania TV1;
- Broken Hill TV1;
- Darwin TV1;
- Geraldton TV1;
- Griffith and MIA TV1;
- Kalgoorlie TV1;
- Mildura/Sunraysia TV1;
- Mount Gambier/South East TV1;
- Mt Isa TV1;
- Riverland TV1;
- South West and Great Southern TV1;
- Spencer Gulf TV1;
- Remote and Regional WA TV1;
- Remote Central and Eastern Australia TV1;
- Western Zone TV1;
- South Eastern Australia TV3;
- Northern Australia TV3;
- Western Australia TV3;
- Remote and Central Eastern Australia TV2.

=== Media Ownership ===
The act provides the regulation of broadcasting licenses involving the restriction of company ownership. A person who has at least 15% company ownership through interests, stocks or partnerships is considered in "control" of the company.<refBroadcasting Services Act 1992 (Cth) Schedule 1</ref> The monitoring of media ownership is delegated to the ACMA which involves a case-by-case oversight to determine the individuals who are in control of respective broadcasting companies.

==== Cross-Media Ownership ====
In 2007, the restrictions on cross-media ownership were relaxed with The Broadcasting Services Amendment (Media Ownership) Act 2007 (Cth) in which the situation of an 'unacceptable media diversity situation' was introduced.

==== Foreign Ownership ====
The act defines a 'foreign owner' as an individual with at least 2.5% in company interests. The ACMA is responsible for the register of foreign owners of media assets which includes 'information about foreign stakeholders and their interests in media assets'. This includes any broadcasting licenses held in Television or radio as well as any newspapers within licensed areas.

The ACMA's register for foreign stakeholders currently has 76 registered foreign stakeholders.

==== The 2 out of 3 rule ====
One of the central protections from the concentration of broadcasting companies is described as the '2 out of 3' rule which is defined in the Act:

'A person cannot control more than two of the regulated media platforms (commercial television, commercial radio and associated newspapers) in any commercial radio licence area.'

In 2017, the rule was repealed from the Act by the Turnbull government. The government argued that the media landscape 'in the face of digitisation' required Australian media to be able to grow unrestricted in order to maintain competitiveness against a growing demand for internet services to be integrated into traditional media platforms.

The amendments led to the takeover of Fairfax Media by Nine Entertainment; two of Australia's largest broadcasting companies in television, radio and print media. The resulting merger of the companies was scrutinised for its damage to media diversity and independent investigative journalism in Australia.

==== 75% coverage rule ====
The 75% was also abolished with the Broadcasting Legislation Amendment (Broadcasting Reform) Bill 2017. The rule had dictated that broadcasting companies cannot have more than a '75% audience reach' within a license area.

==== The 5/4 rule ====
The Broadcasting Services Amendment (Media Ownership) Act 2007 (Media Ownership Bill) proposed a 5/4 voices rule:

'a minimum of five separate traditional media 'voices' in metropolitan radio license areas and four in regional radio license areas'.

The rule remains in place following the 2017 broadcasting reform.

The bill also introduced the theoretical situation where the level of media diversity becomes 'unacceptable'. The ACMA would be required to enforce the new regulations and step in where necessary.

==== One to a market or Two to a market rule ====
This rule pertains to any license area and restricts any individual from having control over more than:

- one television license or;
- two radio licenses

The rule is described in the Act as a 'statutory control rule'. The rule remains in place following the 2017 broadcasting reform.

== Amendments ==
In 1998, the Act was amended to provide accessibility for digital broadcasters to transmission infrastructure. On 1 January 2000, Schedule 5 of the Act was implemented, with the amendment introducing the regulation of online services. This involves the regulation of Internet service providers and a mechanism in which content can be reported for breaching established codes of practice. Schedule 6 was implemented in 2003 and provides regulation of datacasting services. The amendment introduces datacasting licences and restrictions overseen by the ACMA. Schedule 7 was implemented in 2007 and aims to regulate online content. The amendment introduces a new role for the classification board to assist in classifying age restrictions for online content. Schedule 8 was passed through the Communications Legislation Amendment (Online Content Services and Other Measures) Bill 2017. The amendment provides the ACMA with the ability to restrict online promotional gambling content. In 2015, the e-safety commissioner was introduced through the Enhancing Online Safety Act 2015 (Cth). This legislation operates parallel to the Broadcasting Services Act 1992 with the commissioner's role involving establishing internet industry codes of practice.

== Legacy ==
In 2004, a report into the operation of schedule 5 (the regulation of online broadcasting services) observed several recommendations to be considered by parliament. These include:

- The improvement of filtering technologies to restrict overseas content not subject to a regulated classification system.
- Promote Internet service providers to provide a 'family-friendly ISP program' on an 'opt-out basis'.
- Support the investment of a community education program focusing on child safety on the internet.
- Promote and ensure the cooperation of ISP's with law enforcement agencies.
- Monitor the emerging broadcasting services such as multimedia messaging services to ensure regulation can be provided with minimal amendment.
- Promote the convergence of the Internet Content Rating Association with the Australian Classification board.

Carolyn Lingerwood, a former government advisor regarding the Broadcasting Services Act 1992, shared recommendations in 2002 for the broadcasting regulation in Australia to be restructured. This involved the deregulation of the sector to lower the barriers to entry for emerging services as well as provide a clear set of principles on which to base regulatory measures for future broadcasting services.

In 1999 the Australian Productivity Commission held an inquiry into broadcasting in which amendments to the Broadcasting Services Act 1992 were recommended. These related to the issue of 'freedom of expression' specifically regarding political communication. The Commission recommended that the key objectives of the act be modified to include 'the promotion of freedom of expression'. The review additionally supported the "removal of regulatory barriers" to broadcasting including advocating for foreign ownership to be introduced with the same restrictions as domestic ownership. The review warned of a "concentrated" traditional media within Australia, pointing out News Limited in newspaper, Nine Network in Television and Village Roadshow in radio as companies holding majority of their fields potential audience.

=== Public Interest Test ===
The current cross-media ownership regulations have been criticised for not being able to adopt to the evolving capabilities of broadcasting technologies. The solution has been raised in the form of a public interest test. This involves the involvement of third-party individuals and organisations assessing factors of media diversity. A public interest test would 'assess proposed changes in the control of content' and restrictions on broadcasting enterprises. The concept of a public interest test was dismissed by the Howard government for its subjectivity in individuals or organisations concluding what can be considered of public interest.

=== Royal Commission ===
In November 2020, former Australian Prime Minister Kevin Rudd introduced an e-petition to the House of Representatives calling for a Royal Commission into Australian media diversity. The petition directly targets News Corporation and Rupert Murdoch for 'blending editorial opinion with news reporting' to 'attack opponents in business and politics'. The merger of Nine Entertainment and Fairfax Media was also a central aspect for its 'undermining' of 'regional and local news'. The petition, registered as EN1938, received 501,876 online signatures; the third most signatures a House of Representatives petition has ever received.

The call for a Royal Commission was supported by the Senate committee following a parliamentary inquiry into media diversity in 2021.

See also

- Regulations on television programming in Australia
