= Campaign for Press and Broadcasting Freedom =

London-based media pressure group

The Campaign for Press and Broadcasting Freedom was a UK pressure group, based in London.

== History ==
Originally founded in 1979 as the 'Campaign for Press Freedom' by the London Workers' Control Committee (on the instigation of that body's Secretary, the journalist John Jennings), the organisation was established to campaign for a more democratic and accountable press following the perceived malign influence of an overwhelmingly Tory supporting newspaper industry in the General Election of that year. The CPF later added broadcasting to its remit and campaigned for a more democratic media, which was both accountable and more pluralistic than at present.

The Campaign's first initiative was to launch a right of reply campaign, supported by its strong media union base. The right of reply to anti-union and racist attitudes was secured through industrial action in several newspapers including the Daily Mail, Daily Express, Sun and Observer, while the News of the World astutely published a bland space rather than permit a reply.

Its campaigns promoted media freedom, public service broadcasting, and greater equality of representation in public media. In 2008, for example, it protested about television programmes which had been funded to promote UK government policies.

In 2018, a CBPF annual general meeting agreed a motion to close the organisation.

== Journal ==
The CPBF published the first edition of its journal Free Press in February 1980. The final edition (#216) was published in Autumn 2018.
