= Independent Broadcasting Authority =

Former British commercial television and radio regulator

- Nickname: IBA
- Predecessor: Independent Television Authority
- Successor: Independent Television Commission; Radio Authority; NTL
- Formation: 12 July 1972; 54 years ago
- Defunct: 31 December 1990; 35 years ago
- Headquarters: Knightsbridge, London, England

The Independent Broadcasting Authority (IBA) was the regulatory body in the United Kingdom for commercial television (ITV and Channel 4 and limited satellite television regulation – cable television was the responsibility of the Cable Authority) – and commercial and independent radio broadcasts. The IBA came into being when the Sound Broadcasting Act 1972 gave the Independent Television Authority responsibility for organising the new Independent Local Radio (ILR) stations. The Independent Television Commission formally replaced the IBA on 1 January 1991 in regulatory terms; however, the authority itself was not officially dissolved until 2003.

The IBA appointed and regulated a number of regional programme TV contractors and local radio contractors, and built and operated the network of transmitters distributing these programmes through its Engineering Division. It established and part-funded a National Broadcasting School to train on-air and engineering staff.

== Approach ==
Independent Broadcasting Authority Act 1973 (Note: Section 40(1).)
- Act of Parliament
- Parliament of the United Kingdom
- Long title: An Act to consolidate the Television and Sound Broadcasting Acts 1964 and 1972.
- Citation: 1973 c. 19
- Territorial extent: United Kingdom (Note: Section 40(2).)

Dates
- Royal assent: 23 May 1973
- Commencement: 31 July 1973 (Note: Section 40(4).)
- Repealed: 1 January 1982 (Note: Section 66(4) of the Broadcasting Act 1981.)
Other legislation
Amends	See § Repealed enactments
Repeals/revokes	See § Repealed enactments
Amended by	Independent Broadcasting Authority Act 1974; Independent Broadcasting Authority (No. 2) Act 1974; Independent Broadcasting Authority Act 1978; Independent Broadcasting Authority Act 1979
Repealed by	Broadcasting Act 1981

Status: Repealed

Text of statute as originally enacted

Independent Broadcasting Authority Act 1974 (Note: Section 4(1).)
- Act of Parliament
- Parliament of the United Kingdom
- Long title: An Act to make further provision as to the payments to be made to the Independent Broadcasting Authority by television programme contractors; and for purposes connected therewith.
- Citation: 1974 c. 16
- Territorial extent: England and Wales; Scotland; Northern Ireland; (Note: Section 4(2).)

Dates
- Royal assent: 23 May 1974
- Commencement: 23 June 1974 (Note: Section 4(3).)
- Repealed: 1 January 1982
Other legislation
Amends	Independent Broadcasting Authority Act 1973
Repealed by	Broadcasting Act 1981

Status: Repealed

Text of statute as originally enacted

Independent Broadcasting Authority Act 1978 (Note: Section 3(1).)
- Act of Parliament
- Parliament of the United Kingdom
- Long title: An Act to extend until 31st December 1981 the period during which television and local sound broadcasting services are to be provided by the Independent Broadcasting Authority and to exclude section 4(2) and (5) of the Independent Broadcasting Authority Act 1973 in relation to proceedings in Parliament and proceedings of local authorities and committees and joint committees of local authorities.
- Citation: 1978 c. 43
- Territorial extent: England and Wales; Scotland; Northern Ireland; (Note: Section 3(2).)

Dates
- Royal assent: 31 July 1978
- Commencement: 31 July 1978 (Note: The Acts of Parliament (Commencement) Act 1793.)
- Repealed: 1 January 1982
Other legislation
Amends	Independent Broadcasting Authority Act 1973
Repealed by	Broadcasting Act 1981

Status: Repealed

Text of statute as originally enacted

Independent Broadcasting Authority Act 1979
- Act of Parliament
- Parliament of the United Kingdom
- Long title: An Act to confer power on the Independent Broadcasting Authority to equip themselves to transmit a television broadcasting service additional to those of the British Broadcasting Corporation and to that provided by the Authority under the Independent Broadcasting Authority Act 1973.
- Citation: 1979 c. 35
- Territorial extent: England and Wales; Scotland; Northern Ireland; (Note: Section 3(3).)

Dates
- Royal assent: 4 April 1979
- Commencement: 4 April 1979
- Repealed: 1 October 1981 (Note: The Broadcasting Act 1980 (Commencement No. 3) Order 1981 (SI 1981/1262).)
Other legislation
Amends	Independent Broadcasting Authority Act 1973
Repealed by	Broadcasting Act 1980

Status: Repealed

Text of statute as originally enacted

The IBA's approach to regulation was more robust than that of its successors, and it assumed the ultimate role of the broadcaster (whereas today, TV licensees are termed "broadcasters in their own right"). The IBA took a very "hands-on" approach and placed the interests of the viewer before anything else. For example, if two ITV licensees wanted to merge, or another wanted to change its broadcast name, this would require approval by the IBA. This direct approach also extended to programmes; the IBA could (and did) place limits on how many soap episodes could be shown per week, if they believed programme quality would be compromised.

As well as setting guidelines on advertising content (some guidelines only, the remainder being the responsibility of the ASA), quantity and timings, the IBA also operated monitoring systems for the quality of programme content and the technical quality of programme play-out.

On 19 January 1972, the British government announced the lifting of all restrictions and limits on the number of broadcasting hours per day that both the BBC and ITV could air. Until 1972, both the BBC and ITV were limited to how many normal programming hours they could air during the course of each day – by 1971 it was limited to 8 hours per day, with exemptions for schools, adult educational, religious programming, state occasions and outdoor sporting coverage.

For ITV this meant they could start a proper daytime television schedule, allowing the smaller ITV companies to produce and sell programming to the network. The IBA ensured that along with the new daytime schedules which launched on Monday 16 October 1972 that their public service remit programming would continue after the restrictions were lifted. Schools programming were now placed in a new 2.5 hour slot each weekday from 9.30am along with the continued production of religious programming and adult education.

There were also limits on the value of prizes that could be given away – this dated from the broadcast of the UK version of Twenty-One in 1958 in which a contestant won enough money to buy both a car and a house. In 1960, two years after the quiz show scandals in America, the Independent Television Authority (predecessor of the IBA) imposed a £1,000 cap on the value of prizes which increased to £1,250 during the late 1970s with an occasional limit of £2,000 which rose to £2,500 by 1981. From 1981 to 1988, weekly winnings could average no more than £1,750. On occasion, said limit could increase to £3,500 over a course of four weeks. From 1989 to 1992, weekly winnings could not average more than £5,000 per individual contestant or £6,000 in total winnings per week. British versions of popular American quiz shows had to be adjusted – The $64,000 Question having a maximum prize initially of 64,000 sixpences (£1,600) in the late 1950s, and in the early 1990s of just £6,400. "The Six Thousand Four Hundred Pound Question" was only asked every other week, so as not to break the regulatory £6,000/week maximum. The Independent Television Commission abolished such limits in 1993.

Throughout its history until just before its demise, the IBA put out a short weekly programme under the title Engineering Announcements, transmitted outside normal programme hours, and not otherwise advertised. These provided valuable technical information for members of the radio and television trade. These broadcasts were shown on ITV until May 1983 after which they were shown on Channel 4 and S4C, with the final broadcast taking place on 31 July 1990.

=== 1980 franchise round ===
Regional programming on ITV was a major concern for the IBA, particularly in the 1980 franchise round. The IBA was determined each franchise provided the best possible local service, so the South of England transmission region was split in two, with the successful applicant (Note: Television South (TVS), which replaced Southern Television.) required to provide separate news services for the South and South East, while in the Midlands ATV's commitment to regional output in the Midlands had been a long-running issue for the IBA; in 1980, they were allowed to keep their franchise, but with several tough conditions (Note: ATV was required by the IBA to sell their studios in Elstree, to sell 49% of the company to local shareholders and relocate in the region, and to rename themselves (as Central Independent Television).).

== Engineering advances ==
Rendition of EBU/IBA 100/0/75/0 Colour Bars pattern, later standardised as ITU-R BT.471-1.

The Experimental and Development Department, as part of the IBA's Engineering Division, was responsible for much leading-edge research into broadcasting technology as well as being responsible for the design and manufacture of specialist equipment that could not be procured from commercial manufacturers. In particular, the IBA's E&D Department developed SABRE (Steerable Adaptable Broadcast Receiving Equipment) that enabled mainland broadcast television channels to be received for re-broadcasting in the Channel Islands. During the early 1980s, the E&D Department designed and manufactured the specialised broadcast receiving and monitoring equipment used to build the national broadcast network for Channel Four. Subsequently, E&D's engineers proposed a system of analogue television encoding known as MAC (Multiplexed Analogue Component) to provide a standard for the forthcoming satellite television broadcasts that was more robust than an extension of the existing PAL system used for terrestrial broadcasts. E&D's engineers also designed and built some of the first digital audio equipment for satellite broadcasting including systems using data packets. E&D's engineers made many important contributions to digital television data-rate reduction whereby the encoding of a standard analogue PAL colour signal requiring some 130 Megabits/second has been reduced to less than 4 Megabits/second as used on current digital television broadcasting.

== Satellite broadcasting ==
In the late 1980s, the IBA was appointed as regulator and transmitter operator for the first DBS (direct broadcasting by satellite) service for the UK and awarded the franchise to British Satellite Broadcasting (BSB). A year before the launch of BSB, the rival Sky Television was able to launch an analogue service, and intended to overshadow BSB by leasing transponders from Société Européenne des Satellites' RCA Astro-built satellite, Astra 1A. BSB launched in early 1990, but just over six months after BSB's launch, Sky and BSB merged.

== Succession ==
The IBA was disbanded as part of the Broadcasting Act 1990, being replaced on New Year's Day 1991 by the Independent Television Commission (ITC) (which also absorbed the Cable Authority), and the Radio Authority (RAu), which have since been merged with other regulators such as the Broadcasting Standards Commission (BSC) and Oftel (Office of Telecommunications) to form one regulator, Ofcom. All of the IBA's engineering function, except for a limited number of quality control engineers, was transferred to a newly set-up private company, National Transcommunications Limited (NTL), which continued to run the former IBA transmitter masts. These assets are now within the portfolio operated by Arqiva. In 2008 the IBA's extensive archive was lodged with the University of Bournemouth.

The IBA's membership of the European Broadcasting Union was passed to United Kingdom Independent Broadcasting (UKIB).

== Technical publications and legacy ==
The engineering staff of the IBA contributed many papers to international standards groups and conferences over many years. The IBA also operated an Engineering Information service in support of the receiver industry and the general public offering information and advice about the transmitter networks and reception issues. Its lasting legacy is a set of IBA Technical Reviews published over a period of 16 years from 1972 to 1988. The complete set of these reviews, as well as some other documents and records, is available for free download.

The reviews were primarily written by the technical staff of the IBA but some articles were written by others from the Independent Television companies and by external specialists. The first volume was published in September 1972 when the Engineering Division was located in Brompton Road, London prior to its move to Crawley Court near Winchester in 1973. Other members of the Division staffed the transmitting stations and maintenance bases spread across the UK. The series ended with the 24th volume published in November 1988. One reason for the termination of the publications was the abolition of the IBA in 1990 and the subsequent privatisation of the Engineering activities as National Transcommunications Limited [NTL]; the government white paper proposing this was published in the autumn of 1988.

These reviews are valuable in recording the activities of the various departments of the division during a period of considerable change in broadcasting. IBA staff members were active not only in designing, building and operating transmitter networks they also made significant contributions to new digital broadcasting standards and their implementation. The laboratories of the IBA were in the forefront of the development of digital television technology, as can be seen in some of the reviews but, after the abolition of the IBA, NTL continued to contribute significantly to the development and implementation of the successor technology that underlies modern Freeview transmissions.

Copyright in these documents originally vested in the IBA. On its abolition, its assets were distributed between the Independent Television Commission (ITC) and NTL, each of which has subsequently been absorbed by other bodies. The ITC was absorbed by Ofcom and the original NTL has evolved into an independent company, Arqiva. The copyright is now vested in Ofcom.

Volume	Title	Publication Date
1	Measurement and Control	September 1972
2	Technical Reference Book	Edition 1: September 1972. Edition 2: July 1974. Edition 3: May 1977
3	Digital Television	June 1973
4	Television Transmitting Stations	September 1974
5	Independent Local Radio	September 1974
6	Transmitter Operation and Maintenance	April 1976
7	Service Planning and Propagation	July 1976
8	Digital Video Processing - DICE	September 1976
9	Digital Television Developments	September 1976
10	A Broadcasting Engineer's Vade Mecum	May 1977 (Reprinted March 1979)
11	Satellites for Broadcasting	July 1978
12	Techniques for Digital Television	January 1979
13	Standards for Television and Local Radio Stations	September 1980
14	Latest Developments in Sound Broadcasting	June 1981
15	Microelectronics in Broadcast Engineering	October 1981
16	Digital Coding Standards	March 1982
17	Developments in Radio Frequency Techniques	March 1982
18	Standards for Satellite Broadcasting	March 1982
19	Technical Training in Independent Broadcasting	June 1982
20	Developments in Teletext	May 1983
21	Compatible Higher Definition Television	November 1983
22	Light and Colour Principles	November 1984
23	Developments in Aerials for Broadcasting	March 1986
24	The D-Mac/Packet System for Satellite and Cable	November 1988

== Notable locations ==
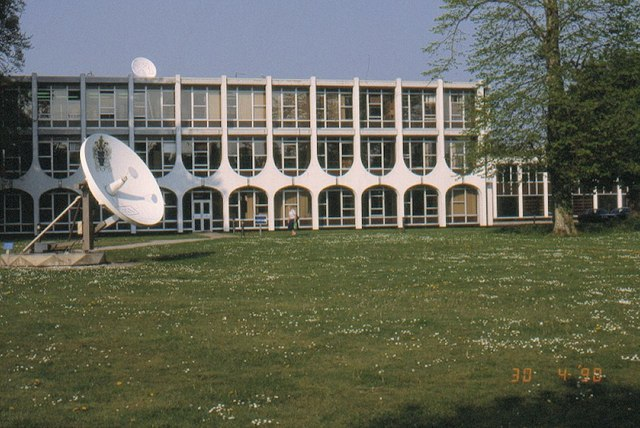
Crawley Court as pictured in May 1998.

Notable IBA locations included:

- Headquarters in 70 Brompton Road, London SW3
- Engineering Division Headquarters at Crawley Court, near Winchester, Hampshire (division novated to ntl, now used as Arqiva HQ)
- the transmission sites now belonging to Arqiva
- the BSB satellite uplink at Chilworth, Hampshire (now a playout/uplink site for Sky UK)
- Engineering Regional Operations Centres at
  1. Beulah Hill, Croydon, in London
  2. Black Hill, near Shotts, Lanarkshire
  3. St. Hilary, near Cardiff
  4. Emley Moor, near Huddersfield
- Harman Engineering Training College, Seaton, Devon

== Notable ex-IBA employees ==
Notable ex-IBA employees include: John Whitney (Director General 1982–89), Gareth Mitchell, Julian Prictoe, Nic Robertson

== Chairman ==
Status

Denotes Acting Chairman

Portrait	Name (Birth–Death)	Term of office		Honour(s)	Prime Minister	Monarch (Reign)
	The Baron Aylestone (1905–1994)	11 July 1972	31 March 1975		Edward Heath	Queen Elizabeth II (1952–2022)
	The Baron Aylestone (1905–1994)	11 July 1972	31 March 1975		Harold Wilson	Queen Elizabeth II (1952–2022)
	Bridget Plowden (1910–2000)	1 April 1975	31 December 1980		Harold Wilson	Queen Elizabeth II (1952–2022)
	Bridget Plowden (1910–2000)	1 April 1975	31 December 1980		James Callaghan	Queen Elizabeth II (1952–2022)
	Bridget Plowden (1910–2000)	1 April 1975	31 December 1980		Margaret Thatcher	Queen Elizabeth II (1952–2022)
	The Baron Thomson of Monifieth (1921–2008)	1 January 1981	31 December 1988		Margaret Thatcher	Queen Elizabeth II (1952–2022)
	George Russell (1935–)	1 January 1989	31 December 1990		Margaret Thatcher	Queen Elizabeth II (1952–2022)

== IBA organisational evolution ==
Communications regulation and maintenance
Preceded by Independent Television Authority	Operation and maintenance of ITV, ILR and Channel 4 transmitters 12 July 1972 – 31 December 1990	Succeeded by NTL
Preceded by Independent Television Authority	Regulation of ITV; 12 July 1972 – 31 December 1990	Succeeded by Independent Television Commission
New creation	Regulation of Channel 4; 2 November 1982 – 31 December 1990	Succeeded by Independent Television Commission
New creation	Regulation of satellite television 1986 – 31 December 1990	Succeeded by Independent Television Commission
New creation	Regulation of Independent Local Radio; 12 July 1972 – 31 December 1990	Succeeded by Radio Authority
