= Broadcasting Act 1981 =

Act of the Parliament of the United Kingdom

Broadcasting Act 1981 (Note: Section 66(1).)
- Act of Parliament
- Parliament of the United Kingdom
- Long title: An Act to consolidate the Independent Broadcasting Authority Acts 1973, 1974 and 1978 and the Broadcasting Act 1980.
- Citation: 1981 c. 68
- Territorial extent: United Kingdom (Note: Section 66(2).)

Dates
- Royal assent: 30 October 1981
- Commencement: 1 January 1982 (Note: Section 66(4).)
- Repealed: 1 January 1991 (Note: The Broadcasting Act 1990 (Commencement No. 1 and Transitional Provisions) Order 1990 (SI 1990/2347).)

Other legislation
- Amends: See § Repealed enactments
- Repeals/revokes: See § Repealed enactments
- Repealed by: Broadcasting Act 1990

Status: Repealed

Text of statute as originally enacted

Revised text of statute as amended

The Broadcasting Act 1981 (c. 68) was an act of the Parliament of the United Kingdom. The effect of the Act was to consolidate the previous Independent Broadcasting Acts 1973, 1974 and 1978 and the Broadcasting Act 1980. The act was repealed by the Broadcasting Act 1990. It was under this act (and the BBC Licence and Agreement) that the Sinn Féin broadcast ban from 1988 to 1994 was originally implemented.

== Provisions ==
=== Repealed enactments ===
Section 65(4) of the act repealed 7 enactments, listed in schedule 9 to the act.

Enactments repealed by section 65(4)
Citation	Short title	Extent of repeal
1973 c. 19	Independent Broadcasting Authority Act 1973	The whole act.
1973 c. 65	Local Government (Scotland) Act 1973	In Part II of Schedule 27, paragraph 207.
1974 c. 16	Independent Broadcasting Authority Act 1974	The whole act.
1975 c. 71	Employment Protection Act 1975	In Part IV of Schedule 16, paragraph 15.
1978 c. 43	Independent Broadcasting Authority Act 1978	The whole act.
1980 c. 64	Broadcasting Act 1980	The whole act.
1981 c. 38	British Telecommunications Act 1981	In Schedule 3, paragraph 56.

== Subsequent developments ==
The whole act was repealed by section 203(3) of, and schedule 21 to, the Broadcasting Act 1990, which came into force on 1 January 1991.
