= Broadcasting Act 1942 =

Parliament of Australia
- Citation: Australian Broadcasting Act 1942 (No 33 of 1942)
- Royal assent: 12 June 1942
- Repealed: 5 October 1992
- Status: Repealed

The Broadcasting Act 1942 was an Act of the Parliament of Australia, passed in the first ministry of the 14th Prime Minister of Australia John Curtin. It was amended by the Broadcasting and Television Amendment Act 1985 and the Broadcasting (Ownership and Control) Act 1988. The act was repealed in 1992 and replaced by the Broadcasting Services Act 1992.
