= Export Guarantees Act 1975 =

Act of the Parliament of the United Kingdom

Export Guarantees Act 1975 (Note: Section 12(1).)
- Act of Parliament
- Parliament of the United Kingdom
- Long title: An Act to consolidate the Export Guarantees Acts 1968 to 1975.
- Citation: 1975 c. 38
- Territorial extent: United Kingdom

Dates
- Royal assent: 3 July 1975
- Commencement: 3 August 1975 (Note: Section 12(3).)
- Repealed: 30 July 1978
Other legislation
Amends	See § Repealed enactments
Repeals/revokes	See § Repealed enactments
Amended by	International Finance, Trade and Aid Act 1977
Repealed by	Export Guarantees and Overseas Investment Act 1978

Status: Repealed

Text of statute as originally enacted

The Export Guarantees Act 1975 (c. 38) was an act of the Parliament of the United Kingdom that consolidated enactments related to export guarantees in the United Kingdom.

== Provisions ==
=== Repealed enactments ===
Section 12(2) of the act repealed 3 enactments, listed in that section.

Citation	Short title	Extent of repeal
1968 c. 26	Export Guarantees Act 1968	The whole act.
1970 c. 15	Export Guarantees and Payments Act 1970	The whole act.
1975 c. 19	Export Guarantees Amendment Act 1975	The whole act.

== Subsequent developments ==
The whole act was repealed by section 16(2) of, and the schedule to, the Export Guarantees and Overseas Investment Act 1978, which came into force on 30 July 1978.
