= Television Act 1964 =

Act of the Parliament of the United Kingdom

Television Act 1964 (Note: Section 30(1).)
- Act of Parliament
- Parliament of the United Kingdom
- Long title: An Act to consolidate the Television Acts 1954 and 1963.
- Citation: 1964 c. 21
- Territorial extent: United Kingdom (Note: Section 30(2).)

Dates
- Royal assent: 25 March 1964
- Commencement: 31 July 1964 (Note: Section 30(4).)
- Repealed: 31 July 1973
Other legislation
Repeals/revokes	See § Repealed enactments
Amended by	Sound Broadcasting Act 1972
Repealed by	Independent Broadcasting Authority Act 1973

Status: Repealed

Text of statute as originally enacted

The Television Act 1964 (c. 21) was an act of the Parliament of the United Kingdom that consolidated enactments related to television broadcasting in the United Kingdom.

== Provisions ==
=== Repealed enactments ===
Section 29(1) of the act repealed 2 enactments, listed in that section.

Enactments repealed by section 29(1)
Citation	Short title	Extent of repeal
2 & 3 Eliz. 2. c. 55	Television Act 1954	The whole act.
1963 c. 50	Television Act 1963	The whole act.

== Subsequent developments ==
The whole act was repealed by section 39(1) of, and part I of schedule 3 to, the Independent Broadcasting Authority Act 1973, which came into operation on 31 July 1973.
