= Independent Broadcasting Authority Act 1973 =

Act of the Parliament of the United Kingdom

Independent Broadcasting Authority Act 1973 (Note: Section 40(1).)
- Act of Parliament
- Parliament of the United Kingdom
- Long title: An Act to consolidate the Television and Sound Broadcasting Acts 1964 and 1972.
- Citation: 1973 c. 19
- Territorial extent: United Kingdom (Note: Section 40(2).)

Dates
- Royal assent: 23 May 1973
- Commencement: 31 July 1973 (Note: Section 40(4).)
- Repealed: 1 January 1982 (Note: Section 66(4) of the Broadcasting Act 1981.)
Other legislation
Amends	See § Repealed enactments
Repeals/revokes	See § Repealed enactments
Amended by	Independent Broadcasting Authority Act 1974; Independent Broadcasting Authority (No. 2) Act 1974; Independent Broadcasting Authority Act 1978; Independent Broadcasting Authority Act 1979
Repealed by	Broadcasting Act 1981

Status: Repealed

Text of statute as originally enacted

The Independent Broadcasting Authority Act 1973 (c. 19) was an act of the Parliament of the United Kingdom that consolidated enactments relating to television and local sound broadcasting in the United Kingdom.

== Provisions ==
=== Repealed enactments ===
Section 39(1) of the act repealed 4 enactments and 1 instrument, listed in parts I and II of schedule 3 to the act, respectively.

Part I – Enactments repealed
Citation	Short title	Extent of repeal
1964 c. 21	Television Act 1964	The whole act.
1969 c. 48	Post Office Act 1969	In section 3(1), paragraph (b) and the word "and" immediately preceding that paragraph.
1972 c. 11	Superannuation Act 1972	In Schedule 4, the entry relating to the Authority. In Schedule 6, paragraph 44.
1972 c. 31	Sound Broadcasting Act 1972	The whole act.

Part II – Order revoked
Citation	Title	Extent of revocation
SI 1971/309	The Television Act 1964 (Additional Payments) Order 1971	The whole order.

== Subsequent developments ==
The whole act was repealed by section 65(4) of, and schedule 9 to, the Broadcasting Act 1981, which came into force on 1 January 1982.
