= Gingell =

Gingell or Gyngell is a last name of English origin from the county of Wiltshire, in the west country of England.

The name is probably of Anglo-Saxon origin, from one of the estimated seven to ten thousand villages and hamlets that have disappeared in Britain. The placename itself may mean "Ginge Dale" or "the hill or valley of the people of Gaeging", from the personal name derived from the Old English pre 7th-century "gaegan", to turn aside, and the Old English "hyll", a hill, or the Old English "dael", valley. The first recorded spelling of the family name is shown to be that of Michael de Gingedale, which was dated 1273, in the "Hundred Rolls of Wiltshire", during the reign of King Edward 1, 1272–1307.

Notable people with the surname include:

- Albert Gingell (1883–1947), British wrestler who competed at the 1908 Summer Olympics
- Allan Gyngell (1947–2023), Australian public servant and diplomat
- Bruce Gyngell (1929–2000), Australian television executive
- David Gyngell (born 1966), CEO of Australia's Channel Nine television network
- Denise Gyngell (born 1961), British singer, actress and model
- Fred Gingell (1930–1999), English-born Canadian politician
- Glenn Gingell (born 1953), Australian rules footballer
- Harry Gingell (1916–1993), Australian rules footballer
- John Gingell (1925–2009), senior Royal Air Force commander
- Judy Gingell (born 1946), aboriginal Canadian politician
- Kym Gyngell (born 1952), Australian comedian and actor
- Ron Gingell (1920–1988), English footballer and football manager
- Skye Gyngell (1963–2025), Australian chef
- William Bruce Gingell (1819–1899), British architect
