= 1991 ITV franchise auctions =

Contest for TV broadcast licences

The ITV logo in 1991

The 1991 ITV franchise auctions were a mechanism created by the British government to award licences to broadcast on Channel 3, the commercial television network commonly known as ITV. They were a significant and highly controversial episode in the transition from a broadcasting duopoly of ITV and the BBC to a competitive, deregulated market.

The award and periodic review of regional and national ITV licences had originally been based on the regulator's assessment of an applicant's merit. By the late 1980s, however, the Thatcher government was dissatisfied with the ITV companies, regarding them as inefficient monopolists in the commercial TV market. As part of a wider deregulation effort in the Broadcasting Act 1990, the government decided to award the ITV franchises through a hybrid blind auction with safeguards to protect quality and financial sustainability. The intention was to bring new, leaner companies into ITV and reduce the monopoly profits of the existing licence-holders. The mechanism was widely criticised for taking money out of programming and encouraging speculative bidding.

The auctions produced almost a year of uncertainty and conjecture. There were high-profile outside bids from Richard Branson, Phil Redmond, the Walt Disney Company and others. Forty applicants bid for the sixteen franchises, which were awarded in October 1991. Four incumbent companies lost their licences, including Thames Television, the largest ITV franchiser, and TV-am, the world's most profitable TV station at the time. The results led to commentary about the relationship between politics and the TV industry and the likelihood of a decline in programme standards. After the licences came into effect in 1993, some ITV companies struggled financially and the network as a whole came under increased competition, contributing to a wave of mergers and the establishment of ITV plc in 2004.

== Background ==
The ITV network after the last round of changes came into effect in 1982

Commercial television launched in the United Kingdom as a result of the Television Act 1954, and Independent Television began broadcasting in London in 1955. By the early 1970s, there were fifteen regional commercial broadcasting licences across the UK, each held by a different company (one license previously operated by WWN collapsed through financial failure and was merged to create the Wales & West license). Each region was franchised to a single company, except London, where there were two: one from Monday mornings to Friday evenings, the weekday franchise; and another from Friday evenings to Sunday nights, the weekend franchise. The ITV companies jointly controlled ITN, which produced national and international news for the network.

The last franchise round, in 1980, had operated under virtually the same rules as all previous ones: bidders submitted a programming proposal to the Independent Broadcasting Authority, and the regulatory body chose the submission it regarded as the most promising. In that round, Westward Television and Southern Television had lost their franchises, to TSW and TVS respectively. ATV, the franchisee for the English midlands, was compelled by the regulator to reorganise itself into Central Independent Television, becoming essentially a new company with a stronger regional focus. In addition, the contract for a national breakfast service on ITV was awarded to TV-am, which began broadcasting in 1983.

The launch of Channel 4 in 1982 also involved the ITV companies. Although the new channel was administratively independent of the network, the ITV companies were responsible for selling its advertising space, thus preserving their monopoly over terrestrial TV ad revenue.

=== Broadcasting Act 1990 ===
In the 1980s, it became clear that British television's duopoly of the BBC and ITV was not going to last. Though ITV's programming remained highly popular and critically acclaimed, the growth of independent production companies fostered by Channel 4 and the rise of cable and satellite television presented serious threats to ITV's near-monopoly over commercial production and advertising. Relatively high trade union influence made ITV a bête noire of Prime Minister Margaret Thatcher and her free-market allies, including the advertising company Saatchi & Saatchi. In 1987, at a seminar on broadcasting at Downing Street, Thatcher described ITV as "the last bastion of restrictive practices". Unsuccessful forays into multi-channel broadcasting with Super Channel and British Satellite Broadcasting in the late 1980s and early 1990s increased the financial pressure on the ITV companies.

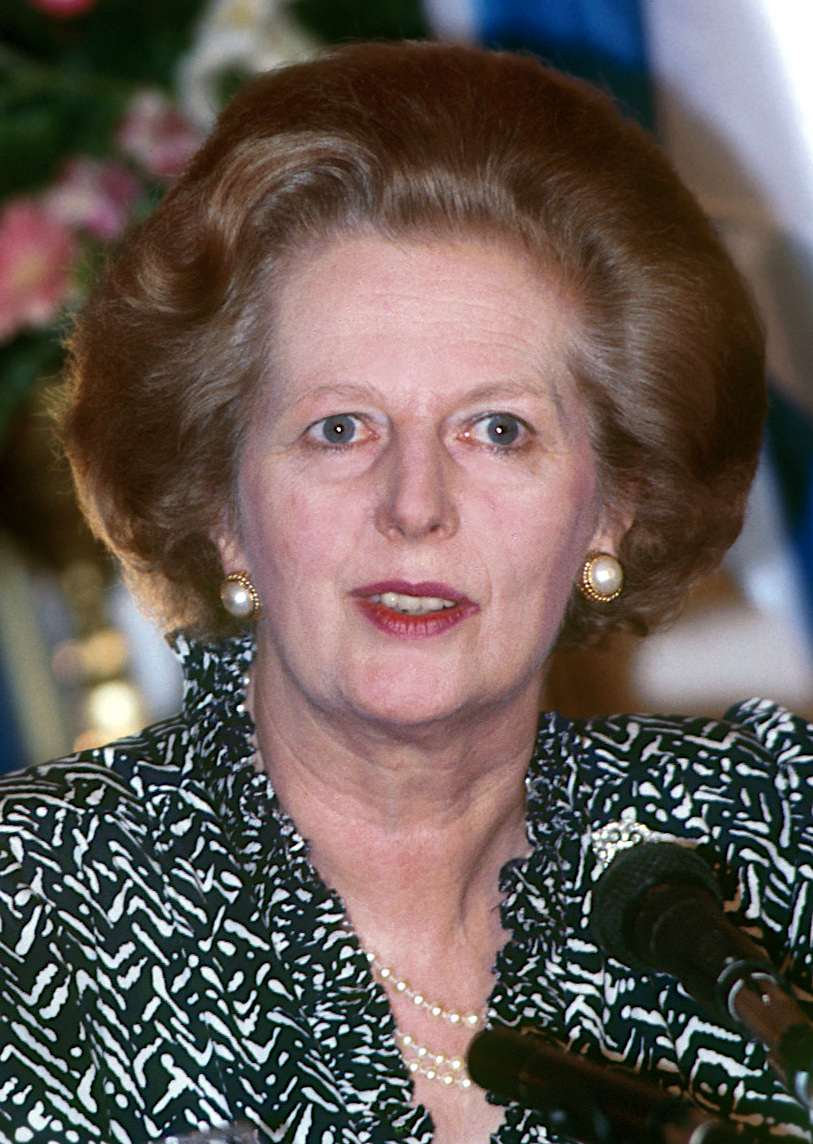
Prime Minister Margaret Thatcher (pictured in 1986) described ITV as "the last bastion of restrictive practices".

In 1985, the Thatcher government formed the Peacock Committee to look into deregulating British broadcasting. Though many of the committee's recommendations were not adopted, its work formed the basis for a White Paper, and in turn a Broadcasting Bill. Among other things, this proposed the launch of a fifth terrestrial TV channel, new quotas for independent production on both the BBC and ITV, and the replacement of the Independent Broadcasting Authority with a lighter-touch regulator, the Independent Television Commission. The government also proposed to allow Channel 4 to sell its own advertising for the first time.

Under the draft law, network scheduling plans would need to be submitted to the Office of Fair Trading, to foster competition and eliminate the major ITV companies' cartel-like control of prime time. In addition, the ITV companies themselves, as "Channel 3", would replace the IBA as the legal broadcaster – a sign the balance of power was shifting away from the regulator. Unlike those of the IBA, the ITC's decisions would be subject to judicial review.

The most controversial feature of the bill was the proposed reform of how ITV franchises would be awarded. Douglas Hurd described the procedure used in 1980 as "a system of despotism tempered by assassination". Thatcher wanted to bring new companies with more competitive instincts into ITV to drive down costs across the industry. The government announced that the next franchise round would be decided by competitive tender – in effect, a blind auction. Franchises would be awarded to the company offering the highest annual stipend to the Treasury, with no other factors considered. The proposal was deeply unpopular. The Campaign for Quality Television, which included public figures like Judi Dench, Esther Rantzen and John Cleese, was formed to lobby against the government's plan and demanded that franchises be awarded to the company willing to spend the most on programming. The producer and director Simon Albury told the Financial Times: "Money to the Treasury is the government’s over-riding concern; and viewers will be offered programmes of lower quality and narrower range."

Though on its publication, David Mellor, the minister responsible, described the bill as "a great leap forward in the direction of wider choice in broadcasting", the auction mechanism was watered down on its way through parliament. A quality threshold was introduced, as were tests relating to financial sustainability. After the bill was approved by MPs in 1990, The Stage reported that these changes had reduced interest in the franchises among major international players like NBC and Canal+, and that the likelihood of a major shake-up in ITV was now diminished, especially with the onset of the early 1990s recession.

The bill did not initially include a franchise for the national teletext service for ITV and Channel 4. Instead, it proposed that each of the 'spare lines' occupied by the current teletext provider ORACLE would be auctioned individually to the highest bidders who would not necessarily have to use the lines to provide a teletext service. After a campaign led by ORACLE, the bill was amended to include a franchise for a public teletext service.

== Rules ==
The Broadcasting Act 1990 set out the rules which would govern the award of Channel 3 licences. Each licence would begin on 1 January 1993 and would last for ten years with the possibility of renewal for a further decade. The Independent Television Commission would be responsible for awarding the franchises in accordance with the new law. Rather than a simple blind auction, there was a two-stage process. For the first stage, without knowing the exact cash bid each applicant had made, the ITC would analyse their programme offerings and financial plans.

The quality threshold would only be met if an applicant had:

- Sufficient news and current affairs programming dealing with national and international matters;
- Sufficient high-quality programming in non-news areas;
- Sufficient regional programming, which should be made predominantly within the region;
- Sufficient children's and religious programming;
- Programming with a wide range of appeal;
- Sufficient programming made in Europe;
- At least a quarter of its programming made by independent production companies.

These specific quality criteria did not apply to the national breakfast franchise, though the Commission was expected to consider quality in its deliberations there also. The financial threshold would only be met if the ITC believed the applicant would be able to maintain their proposed level of service over the full ten-year licence period.

Only after these two thresholds had been met would the Commission proceed to the second stage and open the applicants' sealed envelopes containing their cash bids. The highest qualifying bid would be the winner – except in "exceptional circumstances", defined by the Act as those where the "quality of the service proposed by such an applicant is exceptionally high" relative to the highest qualified bidder. The exceptional circumstances clause was complicated by the high likelihood of judicial review in such cases, so much so that it was unclear if the ITC could use the power without having its decision overturned by the courts. In the event of a tie, a further cash bid would be submitted by the relevant applicants.

After the new licences came into force in 1993, restrictions on mergers within Channel 3 would be gradually lifted. At first, there would be a one-year moratorium on takeovers. From 1994, large companies within the network would be able to buy out smaller ones subject to the approval of the ITC, and European owners would be able to enter the system. The Broadcasting Act permitted the government to further relax these restrictions in the future.

=== Timeline ===
- 1 November 1990: the Broadcasting Act 1990 is signed into law.
- 15 February 1991: the ITC invites bids for the sixteen Channel 3 licences.
- 15 May 1991: deadline for the submission of sealed Channel 3 bids to the ITC.
- 16 October 1991: announcement of the winners of the Channel 3 licences.
- 8 November 1991: the ITC invites bids for the public teletext service.
- 20 January 1992: deadline for the submission of sealed teletext bids to the ITC.
- 30 April 1992: announcement of the winner of the teletext licence.
- 1 January 1993: new licences come into effect.
- 1 January 1994: limited mergers of Channel 3 companies permitted.

== Bids ==
As the cash values were secret and challengers were not obliged to make their intentions public before the May deadline for submissions, the auction process was subject to intense speculation in the media. Incumbents who lost faced the possibility of closure and the certainty of significant job losses. Companies who bid too high and won were likely to be unprofitable in an increasingly competitive advertising market. Press commentary on the bidding process had the potential to influence the value of incumbents or potential challengers, many of whom were publicly traded companies. Some incumbents could be unopposed, but had no way of knowing for sure. The bidding process created enormous uncertainty within the existing ITV companies, who did not know if they would be on air after 1992 and how much money they would have for programmes if they were.

There was widespread speculation that large independent production companies would join bidding consortia to challenge the incumbents, and many outside bids were reported to involve high-profile personalities from the worlds of business and entertainment. The sheer complexity of the application process – the ITC's Invitation to Apply ran to a hundred pages – seemed to favour the incumbents. Though press coverage tended to focus on the battle for the larger regions and the breakfast franchise, the ITC Chairman George Russell noted during the initial call in February 1991 that smaller incumbents were also vulnerable, as it would be relatively easy for a well-resourced outsider to match their programme offering.

On the 15 May deadline for applications, bids were hand-delivered to the ITC headquarters in London, amid much media interest. After the deadline, the ITC announced that there had been forty bidders.

=== Contested franchises ===
==== National breakfast ====
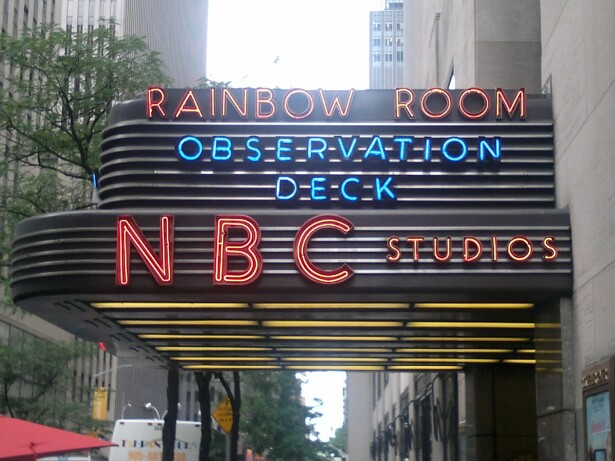
The American network NBC (30 Rockefeller Plaza pictured in 2011) was part of a consortium which bid for the national breakfast franchise.

TV-am had held the national breakfast franchise since it began in 1983. Its broadcasting hours were 06:00 to 09:25 every day. Following a disastrous first few months on air, the station had found its feet under the leadership of Greg Dyke, and later Bruce Gyngell. By the late 1980s, it was the most profitable TV station in the world in terms of turnover, driven by a commitment to informality and a mix of serious and trivial output. In 1987, members of the ACTT union had gone on strike over staffing levels. Gyngell kept the station on air with a reduced workforce and sacked the striking workers three months later. For this, among other things, he was regarded as Margaret Thatcher's favourite TV executive and was a personal friend of the Prime Minister.

An Australian with extensive experience at the Nine Network, Gyngell had made representations to Thatcher over the Broadcasting Bill, but few of them were followed. Going into the franchise round, the conventional wisdom was that TV-am was unbeatable due to its ratings success and Thatcherite ethos. Following the introduction of the quality threshold, Gyngell banked on the idea that quality would win the day for TV-am. He hoped to expand the company after 1993, potentially by bidding for the fifth terrestrial TV licence. Gyngell was deeply hostile to the idea of corporate restructuring as a means to increase profits and facilitate a higher bid, and also believed that, given TV-am's reputation for lightweight news coverage, it could harm their chances to be seen to be cutting costs further.

TV-am faced two rivals, both led by former employees. Greg Dyke, now back at LWT, put together the Sunrise Television consortium. He gained the support of The Walt Disney Company, providing children's programming and a vital infusion of capital for a higher bid, as well as Scottish Television and Broadcast Communications, a subsidiary of the Guardian Media Group. Visnews, part-owned by Reuters, was drafted to provide news coverage, and Sunrise promised regional news opt-outs at breakfast for the first time. Mike Hollingsworth, who had left TV-am in a cloud of recrimination with Gyngell and amid press reports of his extra-marital relationship with Good Morning Britain presenter Anne Diamond, formed the Daybreak consortium. He drafted NBC Europe as an international partner, and ITN were brought in as supplier of news. The Daily Telegraph and its owner Conrad Black were also involved. There were mutual conflicts of interest: Sunrise news supplier Visnews was part-owned by NBC, and ITN was part-owned by LWT and Scottish Television.

Both challengers believed they would outbid TV-am comfortably. Until the day of the announcement Gyngell remained highly confident TV-am would be successful on quality.

==== London weekday ====
Thames Television had held the London weekday franchise since 1968, when it was created from a merger of ABC and Rediffusion. Since 1983, its broadcast hours were 09:25 to 06:00 daily from Monday morning to Thursday night/Friday morning, and 09:25 to 17:15 on Friday. The largest of the ITV companies, Thames produced some of the network's most popular and critically acclaimed programmes, including The Bill, Minder, The Sweeney and Mr. Bean. Thames had faced internal conflict during the 1980s, and both of its shareholders, Thorn EMI and British Electric Traction, wanted to sell their stakes in the company. Carlton Communications had attempted to buy Thames in 1985, but the IBA blocked the sale. Carlton's chairman Michael Green was regarded in government as one of the few supporters of the blind auction system, and it was widely expected that his company would bid for at least one franchise in 1991.

Richard Branson, the high-profile founder of the Virgin Group, was interested in making a bid. In order to give his consortium experience and connections in ITV, he joined forces with David Frost, who had been a founder of LWT and TV-am. The bid was led by John Gau, a former producer of Panorama. Charterhouse Bank provided funding. The Chrysalis Group also joined the bid, which came to be known as CPV-TV: Chrysalis, Paradine and Virgin. CPV-TV decided to bid for three franchises – London weekday, the South and South East of England, and the East of England – reckoning that the work of preparing a bid would be similar for all three, and intending to consolidate its offering if it won in multiple regions. CPV-TV was widely expected to be the highest bidder for the London weekday franchise, which was its priority.

Carlton also bid against Thames, with a consortium comprising The Daily Telegraph and the Italian RCS MediaGroup. Carlton proposed to act as a publisher-broadcaster, commissioning programmes from independent production companies rather than producing any themselves. The consortium's auction strategy was to promise more of the same while bidding higher than Thames, in an attempt to ensure that it could not be rejected on quality grounds or exceptional circumstances. It was widely understood that Thames had bid the lowest of the three London weekday applicants. In public, Thames made contingency plans for defeat, proposing to become an independent producer of programmes for ITV and others. In private, the company's chief executive Richard Dunn was confident the exceptional circumstances clause would be invoked to prevent Thames losing its licence.

==== North West of England ====
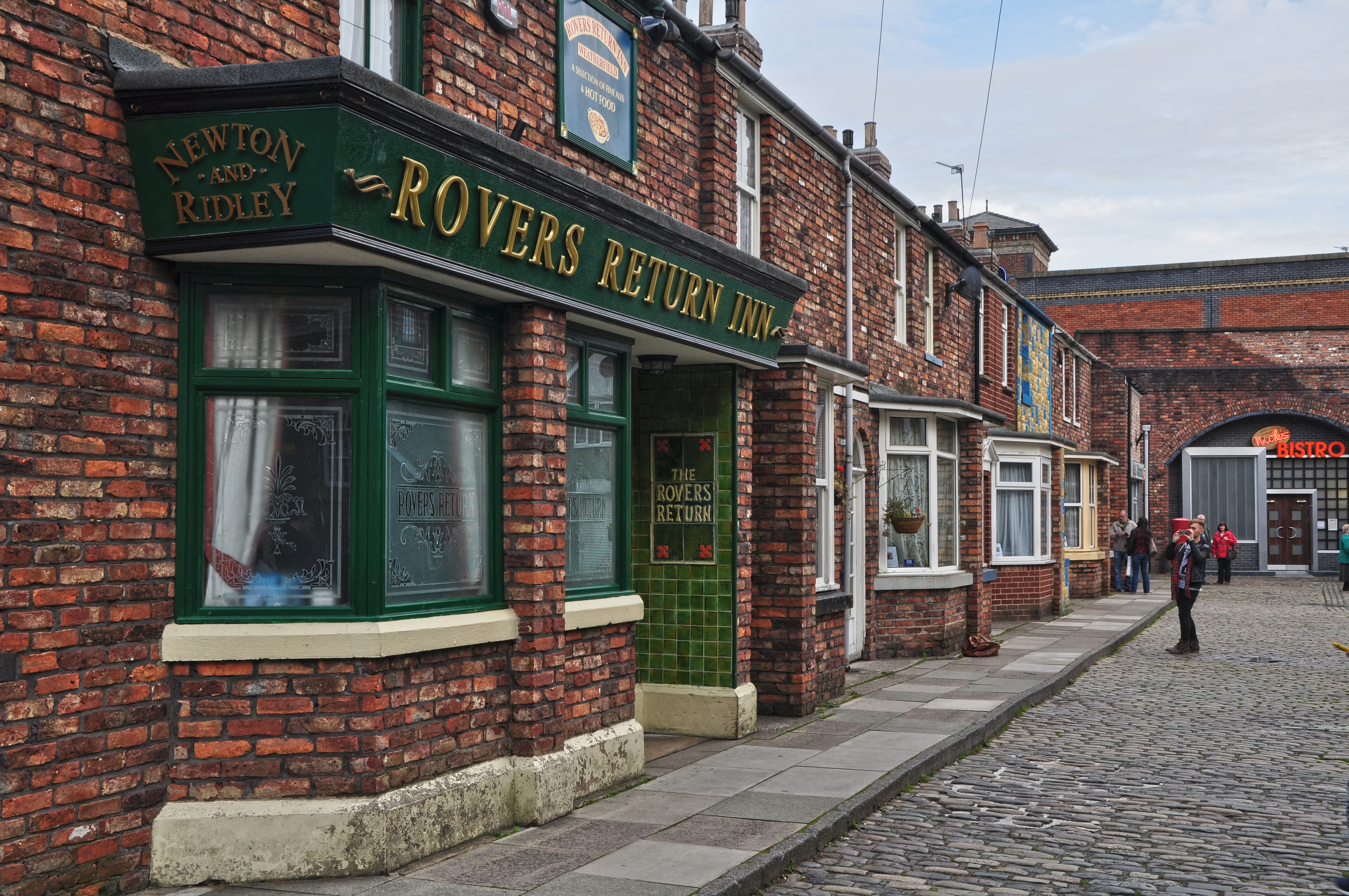
The fate of Coronation Street (set pictured in 2014) was a major subplot of the franchise auction.

Granada Television had held the North West of England franchise since 1968, and before that had broadcast to the North West and Yorkshire since 1956. It was the oldest surviving ITV company. It produced a number of the network's most popular and critically acclaimed programmes, including Coronation Street, Prime Suspect, World in Action and Brideshead Revisited. Granada was one of the most profitable ITV companies. It had been accused of having a bias towards its base in Manchester, but in the 1980s it opened a studio complex in the Albert Dock in Liverpool, at which it made regional news and This Morning.

Granada faced one challenger, North West Television. The bid was led by Phil Redmond, creator of Grange Hill and Brookside, whose outspoken nature generated significant media interest. As well as Redmond's Mersey Television, North West Television was supported by Yorkshire Television, Tyne Tees Television – in retaliation for Granada bidding against them – and Trinity International Holdings, owners of the Liverpool Echo. The consortium was valued at more than one billion pounds. Redmond proposed to give seed funding to community groups to make programmes that would be broadcast at lunchtime and viewed North West Television as a pioneer for the multi-channel era. Granada were sharply critical of their proposals, describing them as "cheap" and suggesting they "would not look out of place on Czechoslovakian television".

Granada's chairman David Plowright was an accomplished producer who had argued for the maintenance of quality in ITV's approach to programming. However, the Granada Group, a large consortium including bingo halls and motorway service stations, was in financial trouble. Knowing that North West Television would bid higher than them, Granada decided to bid modestly and hope that quality would see them through. The media suggested that Coronation Street, ITV's longest-running drama, might be sold to the BBC or even Rupert Murdoch's Sky if Granada lost the franchise. North West Television proposed its own soap opera aimed at older viewers called Willow Mist. By August, Granada were telling the media that they knew North West Television would be failed on quality grounds, raising the ire of Redmond.

==== South and South East of England ====
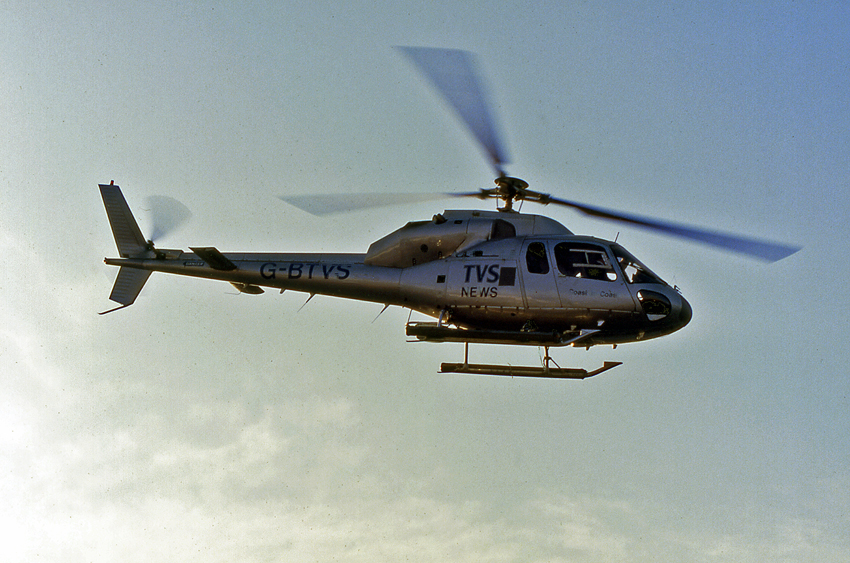
A TVS News helicopter in 1991. By the late 1980s, the company was in financial difficulties.

TVS had held the South and South East of England franchise since 1982. This was a dual franchise, and TVS had operations in Southampton and Maidstone. TVS produced The Ruth Rendell Mysteries and a large amount of children's programming. This part of England, already affluent, had become very wealthy during the 1980s economic boom, making it attractive to advertisers. In addition, TVS had engaged in ambitious expansion efforts, becoming "TVS Entertainment" after it bought MTM Enterprises, the production company founded by Mary Tyler Moore, in 1988. However, the collapse of the US syndication market in the late 1980s meant that TVS were in dire financial straits by 1991, and the survival of the business was at stake in the franchise round.

CPV-TV and Carlton Television put up bids against TVS, but both were focused on the London weekday franchise. The main challenger was Meridian Broadcasting, a consortium including media company Mills & Allen International, independent producer SelecTV and Central Independent Television. The chairman of the bid was Lord Hollick. The consortium was supported by Bill Cotton, the former controller of BBC One, as well as Tracey Ullman and Michael Palin.

It became clear during the summer that TVS had bid very high. The Stage reported that a figure of £55 million had been rumoured, and staff unions expressed horror at the prospect. Including its ad revenue contributions to the Treasury, such a bid meant TVS would be paying over £200,000 a day to stay on air before a single programme was made. TVS argued that a planned restructuring would make the figure manageable. On the eve of the announcement, it was believed that TVS was likely to have its bid rejected on financial grounds, but that even if it won, the company would face serious difficulty staying in business.

==== London weekend ====
LWT had held the London weekend franchise since 1968. Since 1983, its broadcasting hours had run from 17:15 on Fridays to 06:00 on Mondays. It produced a number of ITV's most popular programmes, including Blind Date, Play Your Cards Right and London's Burning. Following the 1980s economic boom in London, the company was rich, but regarded as overstaffed and inefficient. To compete with a new entrant in the franchise round, LWT engaged in wholesale restructuring, laying off workers and replacing equity with debt in an attempt to become, in the words of the station's Director of Programmes Greg Dyke, "rough, tough, and determined to win".

LWT faced only one opponent, and at first it was regarded as a serious one. London Independent Broadcasting involved Polygram, Mentorn Productions and Palace Productions. It was run by Tom Gutteridge, the head of Mentorn. The bidders struggled to find a network insider to support them, however, being rejected by Thames and Granada. The consortium was haphazardly run, had its unlocked office burgled weeks before it was due to submit its bid, and suffered computer mishaps the night before the deadline. The bid promised to be "producer-led, not star-led". LWT concluded that London Independent Broadcasting would be rejected on quality grounds and bid low, its directors incentivised to do so by share options introduced in the corporate restructuring.

==== Yorkshire and Lincolnshire ====
Yorkshire Television had held the Yorkshire and Lincolnshire franchise since 1968. Based in Leeds, it produced a number of the network's most popular and critically acclaimed programmes, including Emmerdale, 3-2-1 and The Beiderbecke Trilogy, as well as Countdown for Channel 4. Though it was considered one of the "Big Five" major ITV companies, it had been overtaken in terms of networked ad revenue by TVS during the 1980s. By 1991, however, the company was confident of success in the franchise round, especially as it had just produced The Darling Buds of May, which had quickly become the most popular programme in Britain.

Yorkshire TV was challenged by two opponents. White Rose TV was a consortium made up of the Chrysalis Group and two local newspaper concerns: Joseph Woodhead Ltd., proprietor of the Huddersfield Daily Examiner; and the Barnsley Chronicle. It was chaired by Viscount Lewisham. The broadcaster Nick Ross and politician Austin Mitchell were involved with the bid. It promised more programming for the Lincolnshire part of the region and proposed to commission programmes like Emmerdale from Yorkshire TV if it won the franchise. Viking TV was a consortium including TVF Media and the Barr & Wallace Arnold Trust, a coach tour operator. Yorkshire TV was known to have bid high and was expected to win.

==== East of England ====
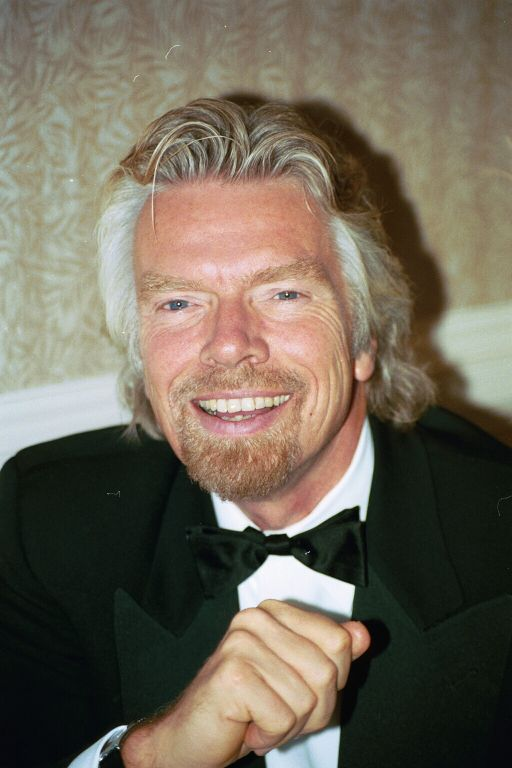
Richard Branson (pictured in 2000) was part of a consortium which bid for three franchises.

Anglia Television had held the East of England franchise since 1959. Nationally, it was best known for producing Survival and the British version of Sale of the Century. The Sunday Express described it as "formerly one of ITV's sleepier regions", but population growth in Essex and the affluence of areas around Cambridge and Milton Keynes made it an attractive target for new entrants.

CPV-TV bid here, in addition to London weekday and the South and South East of England regions, but they were a last-minute entrant. A more significant challenge was presented by Three East, a consortium made up of Emap, the Luxembourg broadcaster CLT and the Daily Telegraph. This bid was chaired by former Conservative cabinet minister Lord Prior and its controller of entertainment was John Lloyd. Three East proposed to have its headquarters in Cambridge instead of Norwich. Anglia planned to become an independent programme producer if it lost its franchise, but it bid relatively high, and was expected to survive.

==== North East of England ====
Tyne Tees Television had held the North East of England franchise since 1959. Based in Newcastle upon Tyne, the station was best known for its adaptations of Catherine Cookson novels and for The Tube, which it produced for Channel 4. The company had a long-standing relationship with Yorkshire Television, having briefly merged with them to form Trident Television in the 1970s. Tyne Tees was perceived as vulnerable because of a decline in its networked output in preceding years. In March 1991, Yorkshire Television bought a 20% stake in the company from Vaux Breweries, ensuring that Tyne Tees would not face a franchise challenge from its larger neighbour.

Instead, the rival bid came from North East Television, a consortium led by Granada Television, Border Television and Thomson Regional, owners of the Evening Chronicle. Melvyn Bragg and Brendan Foster were involved with the bid, which was endorsed by Durham City Council. It was widely believed that Tyne Tees had bid more than North East Television, but there were concerns that the incumbent's offer might be considered too high by the ITC. Tyne Tees' bid was premised on them merging with Yorkshire Television in 1994 to cut costs – but they did not know that North East Television had made a low offer, banking that Tyne Tees would be rejected on financial grounds.

==== Wales and West of England ====
HTV had held the Wales and West of England franchise since 1968. Due to the geographical challenges presented by the Bristol Channel, this was a dual franchise, with separate operations in Cardiff and Bristol. HTV was a significant player in children's programming, operating HTV Junior Drama Workshops in both cities, which were said to be at risk if the franchise was lost. HTV also made Welsh-language programming for S4C.

It was challenged by three rivals. Channel 3 Wales/West (C3W) was backed by Flextech, United Artists, and the Irish public broadcaster RTÉ. It involved figures with experience at the launches of Channel 4 and S4C. Its director of programmes was David Cunliffe, the prominent producer and director, who promised more programming made in north Wales. Merlin Television was controlled by Associated Newspapers and the Chrysalis Group. The chair of the bid was Ivor Richard and the director of programmes was Teleri Bevan. It organised meetings across the region so viewers could have their say on how the company would be run. Channel 3 Wales and West (W3W) was backed by the South West of England franchisee, TSW. It was chaired by Lord Morris of Castle Morris, and the musician Peter Gabriel was a major shareholder.

Though the ITC were happy with HTV's programme plans, there were concerns about their financial forecasts. They were alleged to have overestimated their revenue prospects and share of net advertising revenue. The journalist Ray Snoddy discovered from an HTV executive that the company had bid over £20 million, a surprisingly high figure.

==== South West of England ====
TSW had held the South West of England franchise since 1982. It was ITV's fourth-smallest station, made few programmes for the network, and lobbied hard for the preservation of ITV's regional culture. Its chairman, Harry Turner, was an admirer of Thatcherism, and, following an encounter with the Prime Minister at the Carlton Club in 1990, decided that the company would need to become more efficient to survive the Broadcasting Act.

TSW faced strong opposition from Westcountry Television, a consortium backed by Associated Newspapers, Brittany Ferries and South West Water and chaired by Sir John Banham, the Director General of the CBI. Westcountry proposed a significant increase in news and feature programmes. It also planned to disallow unionisation among its workers. Another bidder, TeleWest, intended to base its operations in Exeter instead of Plymouth, and was led by an independent producer, Malory Maltby.

It quickly became clear that TSW and Westcountry would both pass the quality threshold, and whoever bid highest was likely to win. Turner's team at TSW forecast that Westcountry could not afford to bid more than £14 million at 1993 prices – so Turner decided to bid higher than that, on the premise that TSW would engage in drastic cost-cutting from 1993. It was obvious long before the result was announced that TSW was the highest bidder. However, when the journalist Ray Snoddy reported that Westcountry's bid was rumoured to be much lower than Turner had expected, suspicion grew that TSW might be rejected on financial grounds. Nevertheless, the night before the announcement was made, Snoddy predicted on the BBC's Late Show that TSW would survive.

==== Northern Ireland ====
Ulster Television had held the Northern Ireland franchise since 1959. Though a small broadcaster with limited contributions to the national network, Ulster Television was praised for its regional news coverage in the context of the Troubles. It was widely regarded as the ITV company least likely to lose its franchise, partly due to the esteem in which it was held, and partly because Northern Ireland, with its complex internal politics and relatively small population, was not seen as an appealing target for outside investors.

Nevertheless, UTV faced two challengers. The most competitive was TVNI, backed by a number of prominent local businessmen and Thomson Regional Newspapers, owners of The Belfast Telegraph. The bid was chaired by the Duke of Abercorn, whose father had previously bid for the Northern Ireland franchise in the 1950s. There was also an offer from the Lagan Television consortium, led by businessman Barney Eastwood, best known as the manager of the boxer Barry McGuigan. This bid involved the musician Phil Coulter and the Unionist politician Robert McCartney. On the eve of the announcement, it was believed that UTV had been outbid.

==== North of Scotland ====
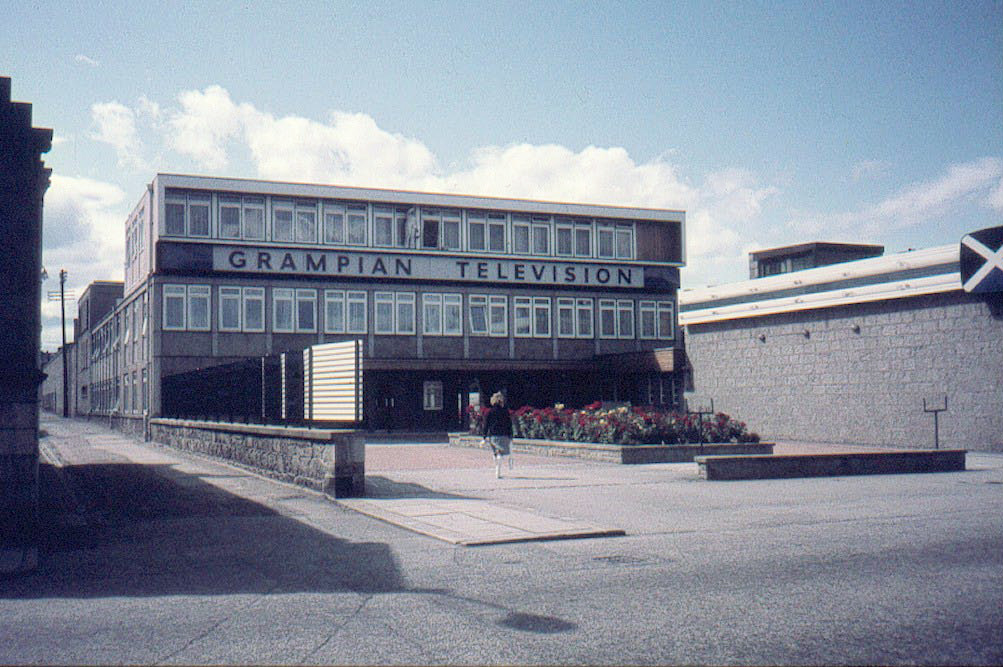
Grampian Television (headquarters pictured in 1984) faced unexpectedly strong competition.

Grampian Television had held the North of Scotland franchise since 1961. Covering a large and sparsely populated area from headquarters in Aberdeen, it was expected to retain the franchise without difficulty. However, despite being one of the smallest and least profitable companies in the network, Grampian faced two challengers.

C3 Caledonia was backed by the musician Donnie Munro. North of Scotland TV was a consortium led by Anne Duguid, a former Grampian announcer. Both challengers proposed to operate as publisher-broadcasters, commissioning independent production companies based predominantly outside the region, and planned to significantly expand programming in Scottish Gaelic. It was widely rumoured that Grampian had been outbid by both its rivals.

==== Channel Islands ====
Channel Television had held the Channel Islands franchise since 1962. By far the smallest ITV company, it faced an unexpected challenge from the CI3 Group, backed by the actor John Nettles, who lived on Jersey. The consortium included a number of former Channel TV employees and promised to expand news and regional programming. Before the result was announced, it was believed that Channel TV had been outbid by CI3.

==== National teletext service ====
ORACLE, owned by all the ITV companies except TV-am, had provided, on a non-franchise basis, the national teletext service on ITV since 1975 and Channel 4 and S4C from launch in 1982. Now awarded on a franchise basis, the teletext licence attracted five bidders (more than any other franchise): the incumbent ORACLE, Teletext Ltd (a consortium of Associated Newspapers, Philips and MediaVentures International), TV-am (through its TV-am Cable Television subsidiary), Update Teletext (a consortium including ITN, Anglia Television, Scottish Television and MAI) and a consortium led by Carlton and Intelfax.

=== Uncontested franchises ===
==== English Midlands ====
Central Independent Television had held the English Midlands franchise since 1982, when it was formed out of a reorganisation of ATV. It broadcast to a treble region from headquarters in Birmingham, Nottingham and Abingdon-on-Thames, and was responsible for a number of the network's most popular programmes, including Spitting Image, Auf Wiedersehen, Pet, Bullseye and a large number of children's programmes. The size and complexity of Central's region, running from the Welsh border practically to the North Sea, made it unappealing to challengers, and one prospective opponent, Carlton Communications, had instead bought into the company.

Central's Leslie Hill worked assiduously to discover if the company had any franchise opposition, and, once East Midlands Electricity plc confirmed it would not bid because it did not believe Central could be beaten, Hill regarded his company as safe. He bid £2,000, which his lawyers told him was the minimum allowable bid. With such a low bid, success had the potential to make Central the most profitable ITV company.

==== Central Scotland ====
Scottish Television had held the Central Scotland franchise since 1957. Based in Glasgow, it counted Take the High Road and Wheel of Fortune among its network contributions. Its managing director, Gus Macdonald, said that it was clear Scottish TV had no opposition because Scotland is a "village" in which a rival bid would be hard to keep secret. He also bid £2,000.

==== Borders and Isle of Man ====
Border Television had held the Borders and Isle of Man franchise since 1961. It was based in Carlisle. One of the smallest ITV companies, it faced no opposition, and bid £52,000 a year, or £1,000 per week.

== Outcome ==
On 16 October at 10:00 BST, the results were faxed to each applicant and a press release was issued. ITV itself broke into normal programming to report the news, and the franchise announcement was the main news story of the day.

Of the forty Channel 3 bids, twelve failed the quality threshold. A further three had their business plan rejected, including two incumbents. Thus, there were twenty-five qualifying bids for the sixteen Channel 3 licences. The extraordinary circumstances clause was not invoked. Four franchises changed hands, which rose to five when the teletext bid winner was announced later:

- **TV-am** lost to **Sunrise Television** (later renamed **GMTV**)
- **Thames Television** lost to **Carlton Television**
- **TVS** was disqualified on financial grounds and lost to **Meridian Broadcasting**
- **TSW** was disqualified on financial grounds and lost to **Westcountry Television**
- **ORACLE** lost to **Teletext Ltd** (announced on 30 April 1992)

The other twelve incumbents all won out. Only six of the fourteen contested franchises were won by the highest bidder. In a press conference after the announcement, George Russell of the ITC noted that while the Treasury would get more money from the ITV companies as a result of the auctions, it would not be much more. Speaking to ITN, he said that such an auction process was unlikely to happen again, as ITV would consolidate in the 1990s. Speaking to the BBC, he said: "From the viewers' point of view, they're likely to get good quality programmes for the next few years, although the next year will be very difficult."

=== Table of cash bids ===
- Bidders **in bold** were winners.
- Bidders in italics were the incumbents.

Franchise	Bids
National breakfast service	**Sunrise (later GMTV): £34,610,000**; Daybreak: £33,261,000; TV-am: £14,125,000
Borders and Isle of Man	**Border: £52,000**
Central Scotland	**Scottish: £2,000**
Channel Islands	CI3 Group: £102,000; **Channel TV: £1,000**
East of England	**Anglia: £17,804,000**; Three East: £14,078,000; CPV-TV: £10,125,000
London (weekday)	CPV-TV: £45,319,000; **Carlton: £43,170,000**; Thames: £32,794,000
London (weekend)	London Independent Broadcasting: £35,406,000; **LWT: £7,585,000**
English Midlands	**Central: £2,000**
North of Scotland	North of Scotland TV: £2,709,000; C3 Caledonia: £1,125,000; **Grampian: £720,000**
North East England	**Tyne Tees: £15,057,000**; North East Television: £5,010,000
North West England	North West Television: £35,303,000; **Granada: £9,000,000**
Northern Ireland	TVNI: £3,100,000; Lagan Television: £2,712,000; **Ulster: £1,027,000**
South and South East England	TVS: £59,758,000; **Meridian: £36,523,000**; CPV-TV: £22,105,000; Carlton: £18,080,000
South West England	TSW: £16,117,000; **Westcountry: £7,815,000**; TeleWest: £7,266,000
Wales and West of England	**HTV: £20,530,000**; Merlin: £19,367,000; Channel 3 Wales and West: £18,289,000; C3W: £17,760,000
Yorkshire and Lincolnshire	**Yorkshire: £37,700,000**; Viking: £30,116,000; White Rose: £17,400,000
National teletext service for ITV, Channel 4 and S4C	**Teletext Ltd: £8,200,000**; ORACLE: £6,700,000; TV-am Cable Television: £6,400,000; Carlton/Intelfax: £3,600,000; Update Teletext: £3,600,000

1. ^{Q} Bid rejected on quality grounds
2. ^{F} Bid rejected on financial grounds after meeting the quality threshold

=== Reaction ===
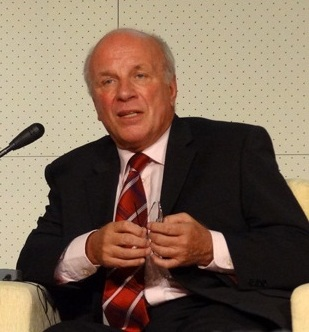
Greg Dyke (pictured in 2011) was sharply critical of the franchise process even though his two bids both won.

Media outlets reported that there were likely to be a thousand job losses at Thames following their defeat, as they moved to independent production. Chief executive Richard Dunn said it was "rough justice", continuing: "We bid the maximum amount of money that we felt the London weekday licence was worth to Thames Television." A union spokesperson alleged that the Broadcasting Act had been introduced to hobble Thames as a result of its production of This Week's "Death on the Rock" documentary, to which the government had objected.

Bruce Gyngell described TV-am's defeat as "a black day for British broadcasting". He said: "The fourteen-million pound bid was a proper and sensible bid given the exigencies of the business. I do not believe that Sunrise will be a profitable company. I predict that Sunrise will be bankrupt in 1994." Presenter Mike Morris said he was "gutted". David Frost, a TV-am founder and a loser four times over in the 1991 franchise battle, said: "I remember that when I was at school, I was always told that the important thing is not the winning, but it's the taking part. I didn't believe it then and I don't believe it now."

Harry Turner of defeated TSW said it was an "extraordinary result" and hinted at legal action. He then said "We made the highest bid because those are the rules, and we lost. The whole thing is like "Alice in Wonderland", we're deeply disappointed, but I am most of all disappointed for the people in this company who worked so hard during these last difficult 18 months." TVS and the Richard Branson-led CPV-TV were also said to be considering judicial review. Phil Redmond of North West Television appeared on Newsnight that evening, saying he was "bewildered" by the result, and could not understand how Yorkshire TV and Tyne Tees could pass the quality threshold in their own region while his consortium, which included them, did not.

Among the incumbents, the big winners of the franchise round were Granada and LWT. At Granada, the Coronation Street cast celebrated with champagne. LWT's Greg Dyke, also a winner with Sunrise Television, told Thames News: "The whole process was a game of poker. It bore no resemblance, I think, to business." He told the BBC it was a "daft system". There was also champagne at Carlton Television. Its chief executive, Nigel Walmsley, told ITN that the introduction of central scheduling from 1993 meant there was a good chance Thames' most popular programmes would remain on ITV. "I don't think we're talking about a revolution," he continued.

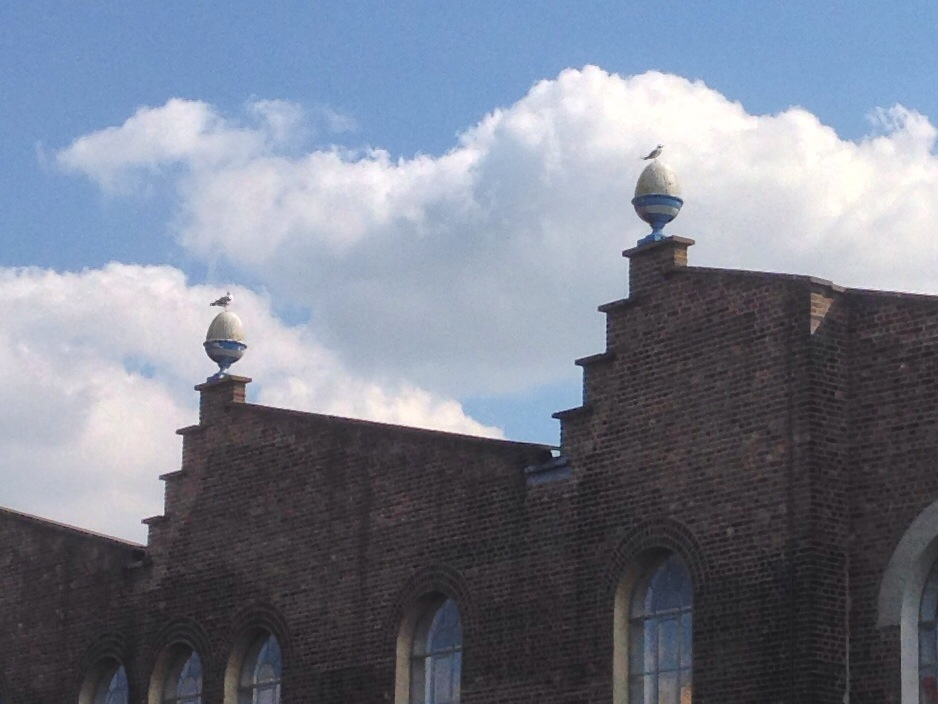
Once known as "Eggcup House", TV-am's studio complex (pictured in 2013) was sold to MTV Networks Europe after they lost the franchise.

The evening after the announcement, a number of prominent broadcasting figures appeared on a Late Show special hosted by Kirsty Wark and Ray Snoddy. The auction mechanism was widely criticised, though Cento Veljanovski, involved in the C3W bid, said it made ITV companies more efficient and competitive, and the quality threshold fulfilled its intended purpose. Clive Leach of Yorkshire TV defended his company's £37.7 million bid, the second-highest winning offer after Carlton. He said: "You either bid high to win, or you hope, and throw the dice, that the others won't get through the quality barrier." John Perriss of Zenith Media, an ad agency, said that he believed the ITV companies, "minnows" in a global context, were likely to be bought up by multinational companies when the moratorium on European buyouts was lifted in 1994 and that this would lead to dramatic cost-cutting and reductions in quality.

On the morning of the announcement, Margaret Thatcher, now out of government, had phoned Bruce Gyngell to commiserate with him over TV-am's defeat. She was, in Gyngell's words, "very upset about it". The following day, Gyngell received a letter from Thatcher, and read it publicly at TV-am's annual broadcast journalism awards, which coincidentally took place that afternoon at Claridge's. It said: "When I see how some of the other licences have been awarded I am mystified you did not receive yours, and heartbroken ... I am only too aware that I was responsible for the legislation."

Following the loss of the franchise, TV-am made massive cuts to reduce costs, outsourcing its news-gathering to Sky News. Other stations across the network also laid off staff, so that in the summer of 1992, Broadcast magazine estimated that there were forty applicants for every vacancy in ITV. Also in 1992, Sunrise Television changed its name to GMTV, the name with which it went to air in 1993.

=== Legal challenges ===
A number of failed applicants considered judicial review, but some decided against due to prohibitive costs, and others had their applications rejected by the Court of Appeal. TSW were the only company to be given a full hearing, at which the ITC's decision-making process was scrutinised publicly. It was revealed that the ITC had estimated that TSW's fixed costs would be 91 per cent of its forecast revenue over the ten-year licence period. On 5 February 1992, after six days of hearings, the application was dismissed. An appeal to the Law Lords was also unsuccessful. The court action delayed Westcountry Television's preparations for its launch in 1993.

== Legacy ==
Franchises after the new Channel 3 licences came into effect in 1993

Speaking in 1992, the ITC's George Russell said the biggest surprise of the franchise applications was the size of the TSW bid. It emerged that Yorkshire TV and Tyne Tees had narrowly avoided losing their franchises on financial grounds. Tyne Tees bid £15 million despite having never made profits of more than £3.5 million a year. Stuart Prebble, who worked for Granada and had been involved in North East Television, said in 2003 that the bid "put Tyne Tees out of business". The merger of Yorkshire TV and Tyne Tees in 1992, approved by the ITC in spite of the moratorium, led to a bitter power struggle over which side would bear the brunt of cost-cutting, and the ITC had to intervene on Tyne Tees' behalf. It later emerged that Yorkshire-Tyne Tees had been falsifying accounts to hide the parlous state of its finances.

Bruce Gyngell's prediction that GMTV would be "bankrupt in 1994" did not come to pass, but the company seriously struggled in its first year on air. It faced unexpected competition from Channel 4's The Big Breakfast, which was a ratings sensation following its launch in September 1992. Indeed, Channel 4 under Michael Grade pursued an aggressively commercial strategy after 1993 to take advantage of its increased financial freedom, buying in American prime-time series like ER and Friends to appeal to an upmarket mass audience. By 1994, as a result of a statutory funding formula, Channel 4 was subsidising ITV, rather than the other way around. The growth of Sky, buoyed by live top-flight football rights previously held by ITV, further weakened the network's position. The ITC cut the fees paid by ITV companies to the Treasury in 1998, accepting that the licences were now overvalued.

Despite media speculation, there were no foreign takeovers of ITV companies. This was due to the complex rules still governing ITV in the 1990s, a perception that British realist dramas and comedies had less export potential than American series, and a sense that British broadcasters were not multimedia players in the way Fininvest and Bertelsmann were. It was only after the deregulation of independent programme exports in 2003 that British television became highly successful in international markets. The X Factor, a talent show format made by the former Thames Television under its new owner, FremantleMedia, was one major success story.

In a documentary made to mark the fiftieth anniversary of ITV in 2005, broadcasting figures reflected on the franchise auctions. Greg Dyke said "the system, as it turned out, was ridiculous". He continued: "It didn't help ITV for Thames to lose its franchise." Sir Paul Fox said the system was "barmy", complaining that it "brought in a company like Carlton Television, who haven't produced one single decent programme". He continued: "Was the audience served in a better way [by the new franchises]? Not at all."

Carlton bought Central in 1994, the first of the post-moratorium ITV mergers. Granada followed with a hostile takeover of LWT. Under Charles Allen, Granada pursued a strategy of deepening its commitment to programme-making in contrast to the publisher-broadcaster model of Carlton. Granada bought Yorkshire-Tyne Tees in 1997. By 2001, every ITV company except GMTV, Scottish Television, Grampian Television, UTV and Channel Television was owned by Carlton or Granada, and regional branding was being phased out in England and Wales. Following the financial pressures created by the collapse of ITV Digital in 2002, Carlton and Granada merged to form ITV plc in 2004, with Allen as chief executive. As of 2025, ITV plc controls fourteen of the sixteen Channel 3 licences, while the STV Group, formerly Scottish Television, owns the other two. The franchise system is effectively defunct.

== Sources ==
- Andrew Davidson, Under the Hammer: The ITV Franchise Battle (1992), London: William Heinemann, ISBN 0-434-17888-8.
- Paul Bonner and Lesley Aston, Independent Television in Britain, Volume 6: New Developments in Independent Television 1981-92: Channel 4, TV-am, Cable and Satellite (2003), Palgrave Macmillan, ISBN 978-1349396207
- Catherine Johnson and Rob Turnock (eds.), ITV Cultures: Independent Television Over Fifty Years (2005), Open University Press, ISBN 978-0335217298.
- Raymond Fitzwalter, The Dream That Died: The Rise and Fall of ITV (2008), Troubadour Publishing, ISBN 978-1906221-836.
- Don Anderson, 50 Years of UTV (2009), Gill & Macmillan, ISBN 978-07171-4454-9.
- Jamie Medhurst, A History of ITV in Wales (2010), University of Wales Press, ISBN 978-0-7083-2213-0.
