= ITV advertising operations =

The ITV network of the United Kingdom began in 1955 as a network of independent broadcasters, each responsible for its own advertising. In 1982, when the Channel 4/S4C network launched, the regional ITV companies also began providing the advertising content for the new network, with each company covering the same transmitter area for Channel 4 as they did for ITV. Each station had a monopoly over TV advertising within its own broadcast area, thus enabling many stations to charge high prices for slots. Over the course of the 1980s an increase in competition from cable and satellite systems and from Channel 4 (when it became independent of ITV in January 1993), caused a decrease in advertising revenue for many ITV stations.

In 1989, two ITV companies, Central Independent Television and Anglia Television, became the first to have a joint sales team via a single organisation to deal with advertising, which allowed for reduced operational costs and a larger number of potential customers. By 1992, areas with "sales houses" were reported as having the highest rates of advertising revenue.

From January to July 1993, the remaining ITV companies (Scottish Television, HTV, Grampian Television and Westcountry Television as well as S4C) which were not initially part of "sales houses" created their own joint operations to help improve their sales operations, before moving to other more established sales groups within ITV.

== Television Sales and Marketing Services Ltd ==
In 1989, Central Independent Television's sales managing director, Dick Emery, and Anglia Television's sales managing director, Tim Wooton, established Television Sales and Marketing Services Ltd (TSMS), the first joint venture (sales house) which provided airtime sales and programme sponsorships. The company was created to coordinate advertising sales for the two companies and to provide better resources to reduce problems and overcome other problems.

In 1991, TSMS acquired the airtime sales operation of Ulster Television and Border Television. Dick Emery then left the company to join the board of ITN as its first commercial director. In September 1992, the advertising share and revenue of Central (5%) and Anglia (1.4%) both increased, which drew praise from the advertising sector and from broadcast companies.

In July 1993, a new joint advertising company, Merlin, was created by Meridian Broadcasting, HTV, Westcountry Television, Channel Television, and S4C, mainly run by Meridian and HTV. In March 1994, at TSMS, Anglia acquired Central's 43% stake and Tim Wooton's 14% stake in the company to take full control of operations. Central left TSMS and was purchased by Carlton Communications, while TSMS merged with Merlin, which had started publicly trading at the beginning of the year. In October 1994, TSMS took over sales operations for Scottish Television and Grampian Television. TSMS also acted as a consultant to international broadcasters such as BBC Select and Nederland 1 in the Netherlands.

In January 1997, Tim Wooton become chief executive of TSMS, before leaving in April 1997 to join media buying agency ZenithOptimedia. In early 1997, HTV reported reduced profits as compared to the year before, and HTV entered into a new contract with TSMS, with penalties attached if TSMS did not meet its goal of raising HTV's share.

In 2000, Granada Media purchased United News & Media (owners of TSMS) and it was merged with Laser Sales on 1 October 2000. HTV, Grampian TV, Scottish TV and Westcountry Television left the company to join up with Carlton's sales house.

== Laser Sales ==
Laser Sales was set up by London Weekend Television in 1990, and the sales team also handled sales for Television South. In October 1993, MAS, the company handling sales for Yorkshire Television and Tyne Tees Television, became part of Laser Sales.

In 1993, Granada Media and Scottish Television created an advertising sales company called The Time Exchange, which also handled sales for Border and Grampian. In January 1994, Granada took over LWT, but the deal was in breach of regulation due to the amount of airtime being controlled by one company, which resulted in Scottish and Grampian leaving Laser Sales to join TSMS. By autumn 1994, Laser Sales was handling sales for LWT, Granada, Yorkshire, and Tyne Tees.

On 4 September 1996, Yorkshire-Tyne Tees Television suggested it might terminate its contract with Laser Sales due to a continuing decline in advertising revenue, which was in part due to speculation that Granada was planning to buy Yorkshire-Tyne Tees Television, which happened nine months later.

== Carlton UK Sales ==
In January 1994, Carlton Communications took over Central Independent Television. After restructuring the two companies, the sales operations were merged into one on 1 September 1994.

In late 2000, after the merger of Laser Sales and TSMS, SMG (which by now owned Scottish TV and Grampian TV), HTV, and Westcountry Television switched their sales contracts to Carlton on 1 January 2001.

== See also ==
- ITV (TV network)
- ITV (TV channel)
- History of ITV
- Broadcast Advertising Clearance Centre
