= Kathy Gyngell =

British journalist and political activist

- Born: Kathryn Julia Rowan; April 7, 1950 (age 76); United Kingdom
- Education: Cambridge University (BA.); Oxford University (M.Phil)
- Occupations: Social policy analyst, journalist, editor
- Political party: Advance UK (since 2025)
- Other political affiliations: Conservative Party (until 2014)
- Spouse: Bruce Gyngell (m. 1986; died 2000)
- Children: 2
- Relatives: Skye Gyngell (stepdaughter); David Gyngell (stepson)

Kathryn Julia Gyngell (née Rowan; born 7 April 1950) is a British social policy analyst, journalist, and conservative political activist. She is the co-founder and editor of the social-conservative commentary website TCW Defending Freedom (formerly The Conservative Woman). Her policy work focuses on traditional family structures, drug addiction, and media analysis.

== Early life and education ==
Gyngell was born Kathryn Julia Rowan on 7 April 1950. She studied social anthropology at Cambridge University and later completed an M.Phil in sociology at Oxford University. Following her postgraduate studies, she worked as a Research Fellow at the Centre for Television Research at Leeds University.

== Career ==
=== Television and journalism ===
Gyngell began her career in media as a television producer and features editor. She worked in the Features and Current Affairs Department at London Weekend Television (LWT) and later transitioned to breakfast television, serving as a Features Editor for TV-am. As a freelance journalist, she has contributed opinion commentary to several British national newspapers, including The Daily Telegraph, Daily Mail, and The Times.

=== Social policy and think tank work ===
Following the birth of her children, Gyngell left full-time television production. Observing what she characterized as institutional pressure on mothers to return quickly to the workforce, she co-founded the Full Time Mothers Association (later renamed Mothers at Home Matter) to campaign for tax incentives and social recognition for single-earner families and stay-at-home parents.

Gyngell later became a Research Fellow at the Centre for Policy Studies (CPS), a centre-right think tank, where she chaired the Prisons and Addictions Forum. In this role, she specialized in drug addiction policy, authoring the addictions sections for the Conservative Party's Social Justice Policy Group reviews: Breakdown Britain (2006) and Breakthrough Britain (2007). She authored multiple papers opposing the liberalisation of drug laws, including The Phoney War on Drugs (2009) and Breaking the Habit (2011).

Since 1999, Gyngell has been associated with News-Watch, an independent organization that monitors the BBC for political and economic bias. She also served as a director for The Global Warming Policy Foundation, until she resigned alongside two other board members in 2024, and is a trustee of the drug prevention charity Cannabis and Skunk Sense.

=== The Conservative Woman ===
In September 2014, Gyngell co-founded the political blog The Conservative Woman alongside Laura Perrins. The site was established to provide a platform for social-conservative viewpoints, particularly regarding anti-feminist perspectives on family policy, small-state economics, and cultural traditionalism. The publication was later rebranded as TCW Defending Freedom. Following Perrins' resignation as co-director in 2025, Gyngell remains the principal editor of the publication. TCW Defending Freedom closed in July 2026.

In 2017, Gyngell wrote pieces for The i Paper in support of Brexit.

=== Advance UK ===
In late 2025, Gyngell became a 'college' member of Advance UK, a far-right political party led by Ben Habib.

== Personal life ==
In 1986, she married Australian television executive Bruce Gyngell, who was then serving as the managing director of TV-am. The couple had two sons. She became stepmother to his children from a previous marriage, including chef Skye Gyngell and television executive David Gyngell.

Following her husband's diagnosis with terminal cancer, she was his primary caregiver until his death in 2000. Citing her personal experiences as a carer, Gyngell has publicly campaigned against the legalization of assisted dying in the United Kingdom.

== Publications ==
- The Phoney War on Drugs (Centre for Policy Studies, 2009)
- Breaking the Habit: Why the State Should Stop Funding Methadone (Centre for Policy Studies, 2011)
