= Ward Thomas =

Ward Thomas can refer to:

- Ward Thomas (band), a British country music duo
- Ward Thomas (television executive) (1923–2019), a British television executive
