= ITV1 =

British free-to-air television channel

- Logo used since 15 November 2022

- Area covered since 2020
- Country: United Kingdom
- Broadcast area: England; Wales; Southern Scotland; Northern Ireland; Isle of Man; Channel Islands
- Network: ITV

Programming
- Language: English
- Picture format: 1080i/1080p HDTV (Note: 1080p25 sometimes only on Freeview.) (downscaled to 576i for the SDTV feed)
- Timeshift service: ITV1 +1

Ownership
- Owner: ITV plc
- Parent: ITV Broadcasting Limited
- Sister channels: ITV2; ITV3; ITV4; ITV Quiz

History
- Launched: 22 September 1955; 71 years ago
- Former names: Independent Television (1955–1963); ITV (1963–2001, 2013–2022)

Links
- Website: itv.com

Availability

Terrestrial
- Freeview: Channel 3 (ITV1 SD); Channel 35 (ITV1 +1); Channel 103 (ITV1 HD)

Streaming media
- ITVX: Watch live (ITV London, UK only)
- Sky Go: Watch live (UK only)
- Virgin TV Go: Watch live (ITV London, ITV regions only); Watch live (+1) (UK only)

ITV1 (formerly known as ITV) is a British free-to-air public broadcast television channel (Note: A mostly unified television network composed of 13 regions all branded as ITV1, which break away for local programming and advertisements. However, all other programming is the same in all parts of the network, meaning they are essentially the same channel.) owned and operated by ITV plc. It provides the Channel 3 public broadcast service across all of the United Kingdom except for central and northern Scotland where STV provides the service.

ITV1 as a consistent national channel (with dedicated slots for regional news and other regional programmes) evolved out of the old ITV network – a federation of separately owned regional companies which had significantly different local schedules and branding. During the 1990s, the differences between the schedules in each region gradually reduced – partly through the consolidation of ownership and partly through the standardisation in the volume and scheduling of regional programmes.

In 2002, a major change of appearance occurred when all ITV regions in England and Wales adopted national continuity. Regional logos vanished and regional names were mentioned only before regional programmes. Effectively this left ITV1 in England and Wales looking like a national channel with slots for regional opt-outs – similar to channels like BBC One and France's France 3 – rather than a group of independent regional broadcasters sharing programmes.

The unification was consolidated in 2004 when Granada plc acquired Carlton Communications to form ITV plc. By then, the two companies had acquired all the regional Channel 3 companies in England and Wales. ITV plc later acquired Channel Television in the Channel Islands and UTV in Northern Ireland.

ITV1 is today the biggest and most popular commercial television channel in the United Kingdom. ITV1, and its predecessor regional channels, have contended with BBC One for the status of the UK's most watched television channel since the 1950s. However, in line with the other former analogue channels, ITV1's audience share has fallen as a result of availability of multi-channel television, and more recently streaming services, in the UK.

== History ==
Following the creation of the Television Act 1954, the establishment of a commercial television service in the UK began.

The Independent Television service, later abbreviated to "ITV", was made up of distinct regions, with each region run by different franchisee companies. The three largest regions, London, the Midlands, and the North of England, were initially sub-divided into weekday and weekend services, with a different company running each. The first use of the name "ITV1" for the network was as a tuning button label on some TV sets sold in the UK in the 1970s in contemplation of the eventual launch of a fourth national channel to be named ITV2 - this service eventually materialised as Channel 4.

The service was very heavily regulated until the early 1990s. The regulator, the ITA (and later the IBA) operated the transmitters, awarded franchises and had a great influence over schedules, content and technical standards. Legally the regulator was the broadcaster – the companies were contracted to provide an "independent television service" to compete with the BBC.

The ITV network existed in a region-heavy form from its inception through to the 2000s, although the switch to a single unified service was gradual.

ITV1 became the generic on-screen brand name used by the twelve franchises of the ITV network in the United Kingdom. The ITV1 brand was introduced on 11 August 2001 by the franchisees owned by Carlton and Granada, initially used alongside the local regional name, such as "ITV1 Anglia" and "ITV1 Meridian". However, it became the sole on-air identity in October 2002 when the two companies decided to create a single unified playout of the channel, with regional references used only prior to regional programming, such as local news and weather. Carlton and Granada went on to merge in 2004, creating ITV plc, which now owns thirteen of the fifteen regional ITV licences.

The ITV1 name was only used in England, Wales, Southern Scotland, and Isle of Man, until Channel Television adopted the name in January 2006, bringing it to the Channel Islands. As national continuity is often used on Channel Television, ITV1 national branding had been seen on the station for several years previously.

The licencees that use the ITV1 brand are: ITV Anglia, ITV Border, ITV Central, ITV Channel Television, ITV Cymru Wales, ITV Granada, ITV London (weekday), ITV London (weekend), ITV Meridian, ITV Tyne Tees, ITV West Country, ITV Yorkshire, and UTV.

ITV Wales & West was the only exception, using the name ITV1 Wales at all times for the Welsh part of its broadcast area, as it has a higher regional commitment. Latterly, the ITV1 Wales name was only used on break-bumpers and regionally advertised programmes until 2013. Non ITV plc-owned licencees on the ITV network, nowadays only STV Group, generally did not refer to the ITV name.

The network production arms of nowadays ITV plc-owned licencees have been gradually combined since 1993, to eventually form ITV Studios.

== Corporate unification ==
Year:	92	93	94	96	97	2000	01	04	08	09	11	16
Central				Carlton; Communications				ITV plc				
(Thames)		Carlton		Carlton; Communications				ITV plc				
(TSW)		Westcountry		Carlton; Communications				ITV plc				
HTV								ITV plc				
(TVS)		Meridian		UNM				ITV plc				
Anglia				UNM				ITV plc				
Granada			Granada plc					ITV plc				
LWT			Granada plc					ITV plc				
Yorkshire	YTTTV							ITV plc				
Tyne Tees	YTTTV							ITV plc				
Border						Capital		ITV plc				
(TV-am)		GMTV										
Channel												
UTV												
Year:	92	93	94	96	97	2000	01	04	08	09	11	16
Diagram showing consolidation of ITV franchisees into ITV plc

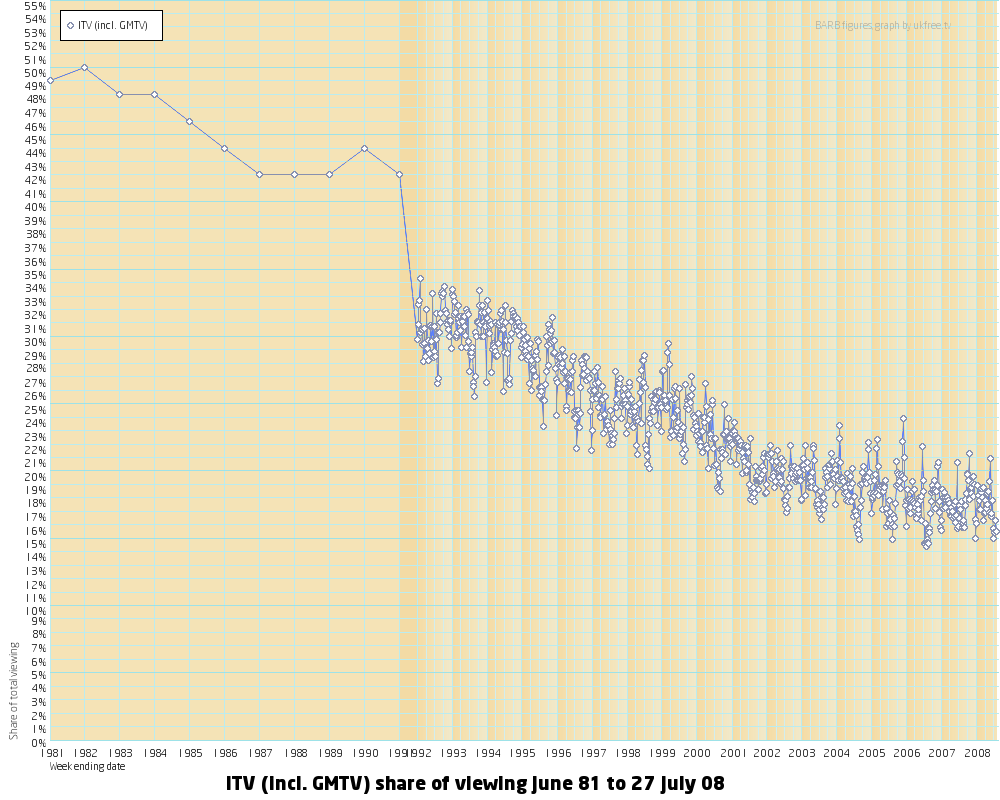
ITV share of viewing 1981–2007 BARB figures

The ITV1 channel was formed by the unification of eleven of the ITV licences. The United Kingdom Broadcasting Act 1990 changed many of the rules regulating the ITV network, which most notably relaxed separate franchise ownership, and hours of production. However, as far back as 1974, Yorkshire Television and its North East neighbour, Tyne Tees Television, formally created Trident Television, a merged entity of the two companies. By 1981, due to regulation, the company was forced to de-merge; however, they resumed their alliance in 1993 as Yorkshire-Tyne Tees Television, which therefore owned the two franchises, and integrated the two companies' assets more than its predecessor.

The intense race to own a larger share of the ITV network began in 1994, when Carlton Communications, the owner of London weekday broadcaster Carlton Television, took control of Central Independent Television in the Midlands. Days afterwards, Granada plc, owner of Granada Television of the North West, purchased London Weekend Television (LWT). Meridian's owner, Mills and Allen International, then went on to purchase Anglia Television in the same year, before merging to become United News and Media (UNM) in 1995. UNM then went on to purchase Wales and West broadcaster, HTV in 1996, while Carlton purchased Westcountry Television later that year. Granada then agreed a deal to take over Yorkshire-Tyne Tees Television in 1997, giving the broadcaster access to both Yorkshire and North East franchises.

There was no further movement in the take-over of franchises until 2000, when Border Television and all of its radio assets were sold to Capital Radio Group, who consequently sold the television broadcasting arm to Granada Media Group. Granada then went on to purchase all of UNM's television interests (including its ITV franchises), which brought Meridian and Anglia into its power, but due to regulation, Granada was forced to sell HTV's franchise to Carlton while acquiring HTV's production facilities. By this time, all of the franchises in England and Wales were owned by either Carlton or Granada.

On 2 February 2004, Granada plc officially merged with Carlton Communications, creating ITV plc, although it was in effect, a takeover by Granada. In 2011, ITV plc acquired Channel Television from its private owners Yattendon Group plc. On 19 October 2015, ITV announced they were to buy UTV for £100 million subject to regulatory approval. The deal also included UTV Ireland, UTV's Irish channel. Initially, the UTV name was retained, but on 2 April 2020 the station began using ITV's national continuity – at first as an emergency measure due to the COVID-19 pandemic in the United Kingdom, then announced as a permanent transition on 26 November 2020.

=== Regional variations ===
The ITV1 channel consists of thirteen regional franchises in England, Wales and Northern Ireland which each broadcast regional news and other local programming to its area. Many franchise areas in England have sub-regions providing separate regional news bulletins. For example, the Anglia region is divided into West and East. This arrangement was suspended in February 2009, when ITV implemented plans to save the company £40m a year on the amount it spent making local news, but was reinstated (with slightly fewer sub-regions) on 16 September 2013.

Since 27 October 2002, on all ITV plc-owned franchises, regional programming has been preceded or plugged by an oral regional announcement, in the format ITV1 regional brand; e.g. ITV1 Granada. In English regions, up until 13 November 2006, regional names were also superimposed (post-production) on these idents below the ITV1 logo, but this practice has since ceased. ITV Wales remains unaffected, and still continues to use dual-branding across all of its on-screen presentation. Despite the lack of regional names on screen, the regional name was usually spoken by the continuity announcer, prior to local programmes. After ITV1's unification in 2002, the two London franchises, Carlton Television and London Weekend Television were merged into a single entity, ITV London, while the Wales and West franchise lost its official identity, and instead was substituted with ITV1 Wales and ITV1 West on-air, with no reference linking the two together (the licence was formally split in two by Ofcom from 1 January 2014, when the West region merged with the Westcountry region to form the West Country franchise).

Channel Television adopted the ITV1 brand on-air prior to the 2011 ITV plc takeover of the channel. UTV was purchased by ITV plc in 2016, but did not adopt national continuity until April 2020 (see above).

Areas with full ITV1 channel branding and continuity:

Broadcast area	Pre-ITV1 branding	Post-2014 franchise	Post-ITV1 branding	ITV-branded franchises map
English-Scottish border	Border Television	ITV Border	ITV	
Isle of Man	Border Television	ITV Granada	ITV	
North West England	Granada Television	ITV Granada	ITV	
North East England	Tyne Tees Television	ITV Tyne Tees	ITV	
Yorkshire and Lincolnshire	Yorkshire Television	ITV Yorkshire	ITV	
The Midlands	Central Independent Television	ITV Central	ITV	
East of England	Anglia Television	ITV Anglia	ITV	
London (weekdays)	Carlton Television	ITV London (weekdays)	ITV	
London (weekends)	LWT	ITV London (weekends)	ITV	
South and South East England	Meridian Broadcasting	ITV Meridian	ITV	
Channel Islands^{*}	Channel Television	ITV Channel Television	ITV	
South West England	Westcountry Television	ITV West Country	ITV	
West of England	HTV West	ITV West Country	ITV	
Northern Ireland	UTV	UTV	ITV/UTV	
Wales	HTV Wales	ITV Cymru Wales	ITV Cymru Wales	

* ITV1 +1 is not available in the main channels (e.g. channel 203 on Sky, channel 34 on Freeview, channel 112 on Freesat), and may be in the regional variation channels instead (e.g. channel 973 on Sky).

In the English regions (plus Border Scotland, Channel Islands and Isle of Man), the channel was known from 2006 until 2013 as ITV1, from 2013 until 2022 as ITV, and from 15 November 2022, ITV1 at all times. Regional references no longer appear before any programming at all in these areas.

- The "ITV Cymru Wales" brand is name-checked only by local ITV promos and ITV announcers;
- The "UTV" branding in Northern Ireland is only used for local programming.
- The "STV" branding in the Central and North of Scotland regions is used throughout the day from 9:25 am to 6 am daily;

ITV network areas without full ITV1 channel branding and continuity:

Broadcast area	Present branding	Former branding
Northern Scotland	STV	Grampian Television
Central Scotland	STV	Scottish Television

=== Regional changes 2009–2013 ===
In June 2007, ITV plc executive chairman Michael Grade hinted at a possible re-structure of the ITV regional layout, stating the existence of smaller regional services "no longer makes sense" relative to the regional audience they serve. The plan was confirmed in September 2007, reducing the number of regional news programmes from 17 to just 9, saving around £35 to £40 million each year, and affecting every ITV plc regional company with the exception of ITV London, ITV Wales, and ITV Granada. These changes were implemented in early 2009. All sub-regional news programmes ceased; ITV Border's Lookaround programme was merged with ITV Tyne Tees' North East Tonight programme, ITV Westcountry's Westcountry Live merged with ITV West's The West Tonight programme, and ITV Meridian's Meridian Tonight south and south east editions merged with ITV Thames Valley's Thames Valley Tonight.

On 16 September 2013, ITV reverted to a more localised system, as was the case prior to a shake-up in 2009, with 14 news regions (rather than eight). This meant people in the Borders, for example, saw a return to a Border-only news service, with all stories covered solely on Southern Scotland and Cumbria, similar to the pre-Tyne Tees merger in February 2009. Meanwhile, in the Westcountry, viewers in Devon and Cornwall also saw a return to a more localised service.

== Subsidiary channels ==
=== ITV1 HD ===
ITV1 HD (logo used since 15 November 2022)

A high-definition simulcast of ITV1, ITV1 HD, debuted on 7 June 2008, with the technical launch of the Freeview HD service. The channel has its roots in ITV HD, which began as a trial service in 2006 on a low-power digital terrestrial (DVB-T) channel from London's Crystal Palace transmitting station, and on Telewest TV Drive cable service. The channel was revived on 7 June 2008, in time for the UEFA Euro 2008 football tournament, this time exclusively available on the Freesat digital satellite service. With its debut on Freeview HD, the channel was re-branded as ITV1 HD in December 2009.

=== ITV1 +1 ===
ITV1 +1 (logo used since 15 November 2022)

The time-shift channel ITV1 +1 launched on all TV platforms, including Freeview in 2011.

== Availability outside the UK ==
ITV channels are available on cable and IPTV in Switzerland and Liechtenstein. In the Republic of Ireland, ITV (as UTV) was widely available; however, UTV Ireland was launched in 2015 and replaced UTV in the Republic of Ireland. UTV has since ceased broadcasting in Ireland. ITV is registered to broadcast within the European Union/EEA through ALIA in Luxembourg.

Since 27 March 2013, ITV1 London has been offered by British Forces Broadcasting Service (BFBS) to members of HM Forces and their families around the world, replacing the BFBS3 TV channel, which already carried a selection of ITV programmes.

== Branding ==
=== ITV network ===
ITV was not consistently promoted as a brand name until 1989 although the name was in common public use. Independent Television, shortened to ITV, was the collective and generic name for the companies which held commercial television franchises. The name referred to the initial regulator, the Independent Television Authority (ITA). It was keen to use this name for its franchisees to highlight the fact they were also public services and not simply commercial broadcasters. In the early years, the network was sometimes referred to as the "ITA network", and the companies as "ITA contractors" or "ITA stations". The companies were principally identified on air using by their own names though some did make reference to ITV too. There were also specific uses of the ITV name – for instance, ITV Schools, ITV Sport, and Children's ITV were used for programming strands.

1 September 1989 to 4 October 1998

5 October 1998 to 10 August 2001

On 1 September 1989, the ITV Association set out a basic package with a new "ITV" logo, which included idents, promotions and general on and off air design, and an edit of this package was designed for each franchise holder within the ITV network. The dual branded idents included a large "ITV" logo, in which the "V" contained part of the franchise logo, and written below the logo in a grey capitalised font was the name of the regional broadcaster. However, only half of the regional broadcasters opted to use the package, which had completely failed by 1998.

On 5 October 1998, another second ITV common presentation (once again using dual-branding with the ITV name) was launched, under the theme, "TV from the Heart". Beginning on 8 March 1999, ITN News was rebranded as ITV News.

By 2001, all eleven franchises of England and Wales were owned by either Granada plc or Carlton Communications, and a new common name, ITV1, was launched on 11 August 2001.

=== ITV1 / ITV channel ===
11 August 2001 to 27 October 2002

1 November 2004 to 15 January 2006

13 November 2006 to 8 April 2010

9 April 2010 to 13 January 2013

On 28 October 2002, regional continuity and idents were dropped in the English regions while the service in Wales was rebranded ITV1 Wales. At this time all English regional continuity announcers were replaced with a single team of national continuity announcers – initially, there were six but the number was later reduced to just four.

In 2005, ITV plc introduced a new channel branding called ITV Day, used to identify ITV1 between 9:25am and 6:00pm. ITV Day was treated as a separate entity to ITV1 and featured its own presentation set focusing using the colours of red, orange and yellow and featured scenes of typical "daytime" activities. Promotions were used in a similar format to ITV1, and all daytime programmes advertised within ITV1 hours branded with the ITV Day logo. A similar "UTV Day" branding was adopted in Northern Ireland.

In January 2006, the channel adopted a new on-air look, designed mainly to improve cross-channel promotion across ITV's multichannel presence. The new logo brought ITV1, ITV2, and ITV3 in line with ITV4's and had been observed on various billboard ads in the UK when the new identity was first used on-screen on 16 January 2006. The overhaul also put an end to the former ITV Day brand, which was axed in favour of a full-time ITV1 identity.

14 January 2013 to 31 December 2018

1 January 2019 to 14 November 2022

On 14 January 2013, ITV unveiled a huge rebranding, including a new corporate logo inspired by handwriting, and the renaming of the flagship channel back from ITV1 to just ITV. Its colour schemes vary on-air to complement its surroundings; a practice referred to internally as "colour picking". Following the buyout in 2016, UTV also rebranded to these idents, using a tweaked version with the new UTV logo.

On 1 January 2019, ITV refreshed its on-air presentation again. The logo and trailers were modified to use a different colour scheme, but the main change was to the idents. In a project known as ITV Creates, a new set of idents were used weekly. They were built around interpretations of the ITV logo commissioned from British visual artists. The first artist featured was Ravi Deepres. UTV continued with its 2013-era idents until it adopted ITV continuity and trials in 2020. However, it used the new on-air presentation on trails with a tweaked version to accommodate the UTV logo.

On 15 November 2022, ITV renamed the channel back from ITV to ITV1 which was used as the name on the channel between 2001 and 2013. ITV1 also received another rebrand, as part of a redesign of all ITV's main channels, being carried out in tandem with the launch of the streaming service ITVX. The logo is now coloured blue and uses idents that are cross-used across ITV2, ITV3, ITV4 and ITVBe with different views which reflect the channel's image and programming output.
