= ITV Yorkshire =

English TV service for Yorkshire and Lincolnshire

- Logo used since 2013

- Type: Region of television network
- Branding: ITV1
- Country: England
- First air date: 29 July 1968; 58 years ago
- TV transmitters: Emley Moor; Belmont; Oliver's Mount; Tapton Hill
- Headquarters: Leeds, West Yorkshire
- Broadcast area: Yorkshire; Lincolnshire; Derbyshire (parts); Nottinghamshire (parts)
- Owner: ITV plc
- Dissolved: lost on-air identity on 27 October 2002 (now known as ITV at all times)
- Former names: Yorkshire Television
- Picture format: 1080i HDTV, downscaled to 16:9 576i for SDTV
- Affiliation: ITV
- Official website: www.itv.com/calendar
- Language: English
- Replaced: Granada Television (weekdays) and ABC Weekend Television (weekends)

ITV Yorkshire, previously known as Yorkshire Television and commonly referred to as just YTV, is the English television service provided by ITV Broadcasting Limited for the Yorkshire franchise area on the ITV network. Until 1974, this was primarily the historic county of Yorkshire (with the exception of the northern areas of North Yorkshire which are served by Tyne Tees) and parts of neighbouring counties served by the Emley Moor transmitter. Following a reorganisation in 1974 the transmission area was extended to include Lincolnshire, northwestern Norfolk and parts of Derbyshire and Nottinghamshire, served by the Belmont transmitter.

Two consortia applied for the franchise, Telefusion Yorkshire Ltd and Yorkshire Independent Television, the former having large financial backing (supported by the Blackpool-based Telefusion television rental chain) and the latter having the better plans but fewer resources.

On 1 January 2007, the company transferred its programme production business to ITV Studios Limited. As a consequence, Yorkshire Television Limited ceased to trade on 1 January 2007. Yorkshire Television Ltd still legally exists, but its licence is now owned and operated by ITV plc under the licence name of ITV Broadcasting Limited (along with all the other ITV plc-owned franchises). Yorkshire Television Ltd is, along with most other regional companies owned by ITV plc, listed with Companies House as a dormant company.

== History ==
ITV Yorkshire, previously known as Yorkshire Television, and sometimes abbreviated to YTV or Yorkshire, has its origins in the 1967 franchise round. That round stipulated that the influential pan-North region, the licence which was owned by Granada Television and ABC, both based in Manchester, had to be split up. Consequently, it was decided that Granada would keep the North West franchise and a new franchise created for Yorkshire.

On 28 February 1967, national and regional newspapers carried numerous advertisements from the Independent Television Authority, each requesting applicants for various new ITV contracts, one of which was Programme Contractor for Yorkshire Area (Contract D) – All Week. Ten formal bids were received by the closing date; another less-serious bid, Diddy TV, headed by comedian Ken Dodd, withdrew their application.

Telefusion Yorkshire Limited, created by the Blackpool-based TV rental chain Telefusion and led by Grampian TV Managing Director G. E. Ward Thomas, was selected as the winning bid. It was chosen on the condition that it 'merged' with another applicant, Yorkshire Independent Television. The latter, backed by a consortium of Yorkshire Post Newspapers Ltd, other local newspaper groups such as the Huddersfield Examiner and the Scarborough Evening News, several Yorkshire-based Co-operative societies, trade unions and local universities, was deemed by the Authority to have the better talent but suffered a lack of funding, whereas Telefusion had the backing of a cash-rich parent. The new venture initially chose the name Yorkshire Television Network, but decided to drop the word 'Network' before going on air. A few days after winning, the chairman Sir Richard Graham said: "We see ourselves as having a particular responsibility to convey to a mature audience the particular qualities and strengths of one of the most populous and most important areas outside London."

The station began broadcasting on 29 July 1968 from new studios at Kirkstall Road in Leeds. Although they were purpose-built for colour production and equipped with £2.2 million of equipment, the majority of initial broadcasts were in monochrome until the ITV network formally launched its colour output on 15 November 1969. After an opening ceremony led by The Duchess of Kent, the station's first programme was live coverage of the Test cricket match between England and Australia at Headingley. Other programmes broadcast on YTV's opening day included the first edition of its regional news programme Calendar, the station's first networked production – the 'Playhouse' drama Daddy Kiss it Better – and a light entertainment special, First Night, hosted by Bob Monkhouse.

The station was hit hard financially when the transmitter mast at Emley Moor collapsed in March 1969 under a heavy build-up of ice. This left the major part of the region uncovered by Yorkshire Television plus BBC2 who broadcast from the same mast. A temporary mast was quickly erected and television to the West Riding of Yorkshire resumed, albeit with reduced coverage. From this, the company grew and by May 1970 the company was making profits of over £689,000. After a series of temporary masts at Emley Moor, the current 275 metre reinforced concrete tower — topped by a 55-metre steel lattice mast — began transmitting in 1971, resuming full area coverage for the YTV region.

In June 1969, talks began between Yorkshire and Anglia about achieving a cost-cutting exercise by sharing equipment and facilities. Neither company planned joint productions or a merger. The decision to form an association was purely down to the costs of the increased levy on the companies' advertising revenue by the government, and the cost of colour TV. The ITA stated there was no reason why the companies should not have talks about sensible economies that could be made, but would examine all details before any association were to be implemented. In January 1970, a warning was given that regionalism would be abandoned, and a forced merger with Anglia Television would happen unless the chancellor reduced the levy applied on advertising revenues, which was also not helped by the high cost with colour television and the introduction of UHF, which the government agreed to a few months later.

With the introduction of UHF broadcasting, YTV had failed to gain the Bilsdale transmitter in North Yorkshire, which was allocated instead to Tyne Tees Television due to the transmitter's penetration into Teesside and County Durham. This seriously reduced YTV's monopoly commercial broadcast area. Partially to address this issue, in 1974 the Independent Broadcasting Authority reallocated the Belmont Transmitter, then served by Anglia Television, to YTV. Although the area served by Belmont was largely rural, it did cover the more industrial centres of Hull, Grimsby, Scunthorpe and Lincoln and it was felt the region would be better served from Leeds rather than from Norwich.

=== Trident Television ===
In August 1970, following a reverse takeover, Yorkshire Television was effectively merged with its neighbour Tyne Tees Television, when the two were brought under the control of Trident Television Limited, a company formed to deal with the problem of effective ownership of the Bilsdale transmitter and the allocation of airtime. It is often contended that the other point of the trident was intended to be Anglia Television, but they were prevented from joining by the Independent Broadcasting Authority. However, it appears that the third 'point' was to be Trident's non-television interests and that Anglia were never considered as partners in the enterprise.

The two stations remained separately run and were required to demerge by late 1981 as a condition of the re-awarding of their ITV contracts from January 1982. Trident's majority shareholdings were sold although they retained ownership of studios and equipment which were leased to the respective companies.

On 28 March 1977, Yorkshire launched a breakfast television experiment. Good Morning Calendar is credited as being the UK's first breakfast television programme, six years before the launch of the BBC's Breakfast Time. The programme ran concurrently with a similar Tyne Tees programme, Good Morning North for North East viewers. Both series ended after nine weeks on 27 May 1977.

=== 1970s: Industrial relations ===
From its inception, YTV had a turbulent relationship with the broadcasting unions (a common theme within ITV). Many employees at the new company were recruited from the Manchester and Birmingham studios of the former ABC Weekend Television and the London station Rediffusion; the upheaval of enforced job changes on these employees combined with a relatively new management of a new ITV station and huge investment by shareholders provided fertile ground for the unions.

In 1971, technicians broadcast a handwritten note that read "'Yorkshire Television have threatened to sack us. We are going on strike. Goodnight." six minutes before the end of "Kate". A black screen appeared before that evening's News at Ten was broadcast. The dispute was involving ACTT union members who had refused to work overtime due to pay rates.

YTV was forced off the air by more industrial action over the whole of Christmas, 1978. This partially coincided with a two-day national shutdown of both BBC channels by strikes in December of that year, meaning that for those two days viewers in the region had no television at all (except for those viewers who were able to pick up neighbouring ITV regions such as Granada, ATV or Tyne Tees regions). Many of ITV's Christmas programmes were eventually shown in the Yorkshire region in early 1979, after the dispute had ended.

In the ITV strike of 1979, the station, like the rest of the network, was off the air for over two months (although appeals by the West Yorkshire Police in their search for the murderer known as the Yorkshire Ripper were periodically transmitted during the strike). However, the dispute was more intense at YTV as the company's management were seen as instrumental in fighting the unions, especially Paul Fox, the Managing Director, and Ward Thomas, the Chairman of Trident Television.

In the 1980 franchise round, several YTV staff submitted their own application for the Yorkshire franchise under the name of 'Television Yorkshire'. They were backed by Donald Baverstock and Jonathan Aitken, MP, who believed they would provide a better service. Yorkshire retained the franchise with the addition of number of relay transmitters on the Lancashire/Yorkshire border, covering Todmorden and Walsden, which were transferred from the Granada region.

=== 1980s/later broadcasting years ===
On 9 August 1986, Yorkshire Television became the first ITV company and the first British terrestrial television station to offer 24-hour broadcasting. This was achieved by simulcasting the satellite station Music Box for a three-month trial, as permitted by the IBA. The all-night simulcasts continued until Friday 2 January 1987 – shortly before Music Box ceased operations as a broadcaster. Thereafter, Yorkshire ran a teletext-based Jobfinder service for one hour after closedown with a Through Till Three strand on Thursday, Friday and Saturday nights introduced a few months later. 24-hour broadcasting resumed on 29 May 1988.

In 1982, after the split up of Trident Television, Bass (brewing and Leisure group) acquired a 20.93% share in Yorkshire TV. In July 1987, Bass sold the stake since it no longer fitted in with its operations. The managing director of YTV said: "We are very sorry to lose Bass as a shareholder; they have been very supportive to Yorkshire Television." By the end of the year, YTV profits had increased to £13.94 million, and it had become one of the largest suppliers of programmes to Channel 4. In October 1987, the production unit had received a co-production pact with Telecom Entertainment in order to co-produce and develop projects, that involved international stars and British crew, around the world and it involved co-productions and projects that came from the deal included the rights to four M. M. Kaye novels for her Death In book series, as well as The Attic: The Hiding of Anne Frank, for CBS and ITV.

In March 1988, Paul Fox left the company to join the BBC, after spending 15 years as Yorkshire managing director. A month later, Paul Mckess resigned. A member of staff said "It comes as a surprise to us, but we don't think there had been a row or anything like that". Clive Leach became managing director.

In preparation of the new ITV franchises, the company started to cut costs which resulted in 91 voluntary redundancies; this had a minor effect with slightly fewer programmes being produced.

=== 1990s: Yorkshire-Tyne Tees Television plc ===
Following rule changes in 1992, Yorkshire-Tyne Tees resumed their alliance under the name Yorkshire-Tyne Tees Television (YTTT) plc. The two stations were integrated to a far greater extent. Following the takeover, 292 jobs were axed at the two broadcasters; 174 at Leeds, and 115 at Newcastle, with a further three from airtime sales in London. Various programmes which had previously been shown at a regional pace were suddenly jolted forward to the furthest ahead point among YTV and Tyne Tees. YTV had to lose over 200 episodes of The Young Doctors to reach the Tyne Tees stage of the serial. Similarly Tyne Tees had to lose over 50 episodes of Blockbusters and two episodes of Prisoner: Cell Block H. Other programmes were also affected.

On 6 December 1993, the North West franchise holder Granada Television launched a hostile takeover for LWT, worth £600 million. LWT tried to outstep the takeover bid by holding talks with Yorkshire Television and Scottish Television. Reports suggested if LWT made a bid for Yorkshire Television, it would also form an alliance with Anglia Television who would take over Tyne Tees Television. By 7 January 1994 the merger talks between Yorkshire-Tyne Tees Television had collapsed because it had proven impossible to reach an agreement on a suitable structure for the new company. A few days earlier Anglia had withdrawn from the proposed alliance, making an LWT takeover of YTV impossible.

The company faced a large revenue shortfall in 1993 of around £15 million, after financial irregularities in its advertising sales, where airtime was oversold, was uncovered by Laser Sales who took over responsibly of its advertising sales. Generally the bids submitted by both YTV and (then-independent) Tyne Tees were considered financially questionable, and the Independent Television Commission, predecessor to Ofcom, warned it came close to rejecting the YTV bid on financial quality grounds. The losses suffered by the company prompted the return of founder Ward Thomas as chairman, and Clive Leach was forced to resign. The rescue mission led by Ward Thomas saw profits recover by 1996, thanks to the cost-cutting measures implemented in the intervening years.

Bruce Gyngell, the former chairman of breakfast station TV-am, became YTTT's managing director on 15 May 1995. On 2 September 1996, Bruce Gyngell made the controversial move of re-branding Yorkshire-Tyne Tees Television under the unified brand "Channel 3" While Yorkshire used a scaled-back version of this branding (still using the Yorkshire chevron logo and being verbally known as "Channel 3 Yorkshire"), Tyne Tees was re-branded as "Channel 3 North East". It dropped the familiar TTTV logo, and relegated the Tyne Tees name to secondary branding.

=== Granada plc and ITV plc ===
On 26 June 1997, Yorkshire-Tyne Tees Television plc was acquired by Granada Group plc (now ITV plc). Granada's first move was to scrap the Channel 3 branding, from 9 March 1998. However, dual branding with the "ITV" name was introduced a year later. In 1998, transmission operations and presentation for all of Granada's stations in the North of England moved to Yorkshire, with the creation of the Northern Transmission Centre. This highly automated server based system was the source to Border, Tyne Tees and Granada as well as the Yorkshire regional output. Continuity from Leeds ended in October 2002, after a unified presentation department for ITV1 in England was set up by London News Network. The transmission operation continues at the Kirkstall Road studios, under the ownership of Technicolor SA. Since 2004, the centre has also provided playout for ITV Central.

On 28 October 2002, Yorkshire Television was rebranded as ITV1 Yorkshire. The ITV1 Yorkshire branding continued to appear before some regional programming until November 2006, when a rebrand saw the sole local ident discontinued. The famous chevron logo continued to appear after programmes made by ITV Yorkshire until 31 October 2004. Today, networked programming made at the Leeds studios by ITV is credited to ITV Studios. ITV Yorkshire is also home to Shiver Productions.

The licence for Yorkshire is now held by ITV Broadcasting Limited, part of ITV plc.

== Studios ==
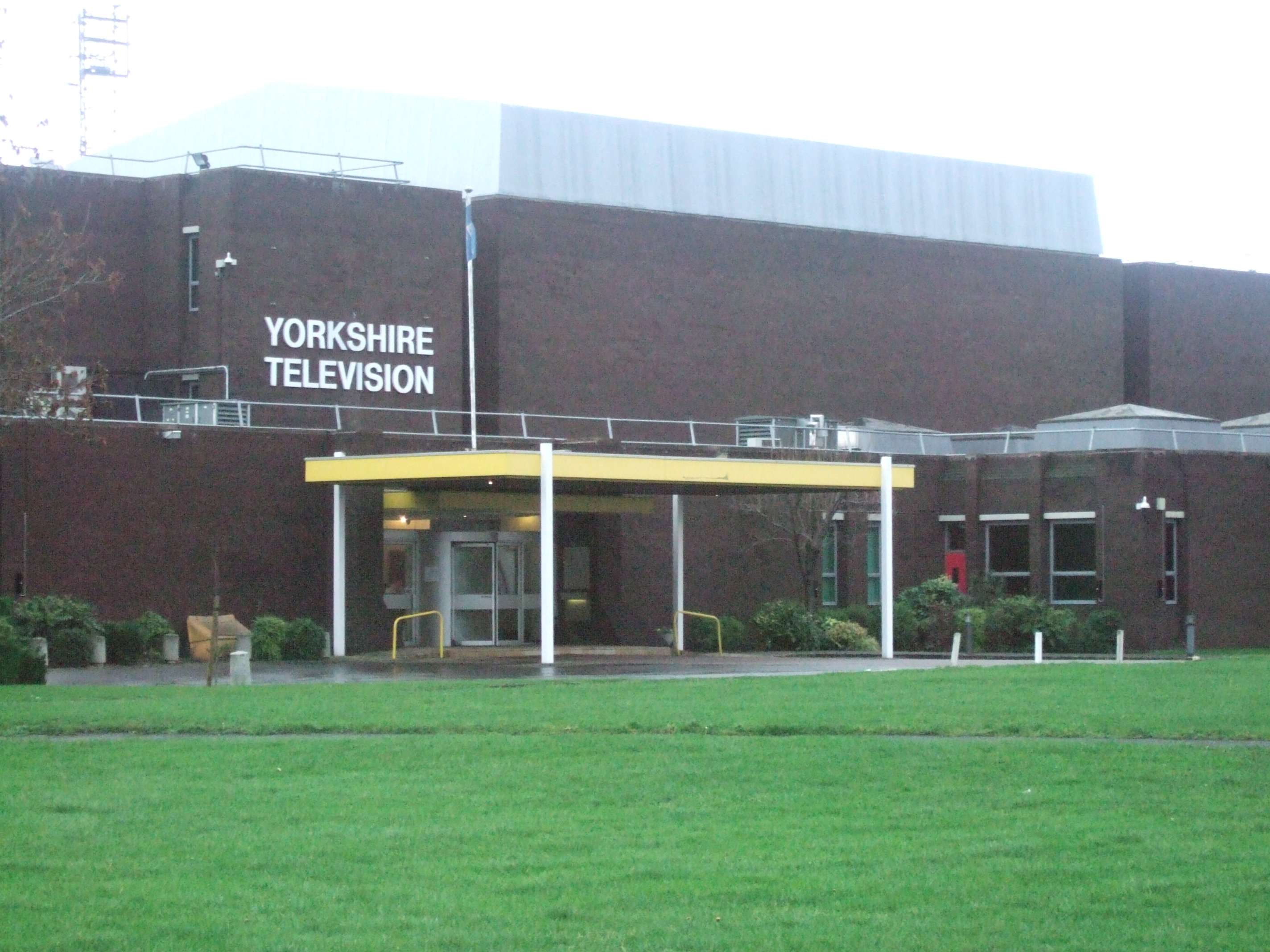
The Yorkshire Television studios

The studios were built on 5 acres (20,000 m^{2}) of slum clearance land on Kirkstall Road, purchased from the former Leeds Corporation.

Construction commenced in early 1967. A mild winter aided building work and by mid-1968 studios one and two were equipped for transmission (studios three and four being completed by early 1969). During construction, pre-launch shows were produced at the ABC studios at Didsbury, Manchester while a former trouser-press factory next to the Leeds facility was used as an administration centre.

The studio was officially opened by The Duchess of Kent on 29 July 1968. It was the first purpose-built colour television production centre in Europe and cost over £4 million to build and equip. Equipment was installed by EMI Electronics and the Marconi Corporation. The studios contained seven 2" Quadruplex VTR machines, six telecines and twelve cameras. The cameras were a mixture of Marconi MkVII's (studios 1, 2 and 3) and EMI 2001 models (studio 4).

The regional news show Calendar was produced at the centre for many years but in 1989 was moved to a dedicated newsroom and broadcast facility based in a converted ice rink next to the main studios.

Productions in the 2000s included Countdown (which has since moved to The Manchester Studios and now Media City in Salford), the revived Bullseye, Mastermind (while asbestos was removed from The Manchester Studios in 2006), My Parents Are Aliens, Channel 4 gameshow Win My Wage and a children's comedy-drama for Cartoon Network called My Spy Family. The site is now home to continuity for ITV's northern transmission areas (although this is now managed, along with its southern counterpart, by Technicolor Network Services) and a number of independent producers. The production facilities are marketed as The Leeds Studios and sister companies ProVision, Film Lab North and The Finishing School occupy adjacent buildings, although the operation continues to be widely referred to as the Yorkshire Television studios or YTV.

In March 2009, ITV plc announced that the Leeds Studios were to be largely closed in an effort to save costs following a reported loss of £2.7 billion for 2008. However, seven months later ITV changed its mind, choosing instead to close the nearby studios dedicated to the production of Emmerdale and transferring production of this programme to Kirkstall Road which would be upgraded for HDTV production.

== Identity ==
The Yorkshire Television logo used from 15 November 1969 to 21 October 1994.

For almost 35 years, Yorkshire Television's on-screen identity always revolved around the use of the station logo: the chevron. This yellow symbol was seen on nearly all of Yorkshire Television's idents and presentation. The first symbol used was a black and white chevron, formed by slit-scan techniques and accompanied by an orchestral version of the tune "On Ilkla Moor Baht 'at", a famous Yorkshire folk song. This music was later to become the station's jingle. This ident continued until Yorkshire Television officially commenced their colour broadcasts on 15 November 1969.

The new colour ident featured the yellow chevron on a black background with the still caption card "Yorkshire Television Colour Production", along with a simplified version of "On Ilkla Moor Baht 'at". This ident was modified in 1981, so that the caption "Colour Production" was changed to "In Colour", and in 1982 the colour caption was removed altogether. The new version of the jingle was at a lower pitch than was previously composed.

Supplementing the ident throughout this period were idents promoting the station's coverage, with the slogan "Serving Six Million Viewers". One version, in 1983 featured a giant chevron logo, made up out of smaller chevrons, and another in 1986 featured the view zooming in from space, to the Yorkshire TV region, which then flipped over, becoming the chevron. This last version was computer-animated, with 3D-style lettering and chevron.

On 5 January 1987, Yorkshire Television introduced a new ident, entitled "Liquid Gold", featuring a pool of liquified gold, with the chevron rising up from it, and rotating into the sky, where the station name joins it. This ident features a fully orchestrated version of the theme tune and reportedly cost £40,000 to make. This was occasionally supplemented by a large rotating chevron over a gradient-ed blue background, used over continuity.

On 1 September 1989, Yorkshire Television adopted the first ITV generic look, featuring the large ITV logo; an additional ident, with a static chevron on the same background, was also used. On 7 January 1991, the ident was revised to allow the chevron to appear full screen instead of being a segment of the 'V' which the company used until 21 October 1994. The whole package was used by Yorkshire Television, and an adapted version, where the whole chevron appeared in the V segment before moving into centre screen, was used before regional programming.

=== 1990s ===
Upon YTV dropping the generic look on 22 October 1994, a new ident was introduced, featuring a textured background with a central strip containing images of the region itself, with the chevron placed in the centre of said strip. The most noticeable thing about this ident set was the smooth nature of the chevron's appearance and, like the previous look, did not feature the "On Ilkla Moor Baht 'at" jingle, instead favouring a smooth orchestral jingle. The background was later changed from a cream to a light blue, and variations on the theme for special occasions and yearly themes were also introduced.

The Yorkshire Chevron logo as used from 21 October 1996 to 18 January 1998, throughout the Channel 3 era.

Yorkshire-Tyne Tees Television adopted a new branding package, based on the concept of Channel 3. The new look was fully implemented in the Tyne Tees region on 2 September 1996, where all on-screen branding was replaced by giant numeral '3', and the Tyne Tees brand became secondary to 'Channel 3 North East', however the look was only partially implemented in the Yorkshire region a month after Tyne Tees's revamp. The entirety of Yorkshire's Channel 3 look included an ident which was later introduced on 21 October 1996 at the same year, where the chevron spun against a light blue background with numeral '3's covering the background.

Another ident featured the chevron with the '3' numeral embossed on the side, which would zoom into view, before revealing a spinning numeral 3, which in turn had YTV chevron on the middle of the 3 and when zoomed into, the chevron re-appeared spinning against the background. The look also heralded the return of the "On Ilkla Moor Baht 'at" tune, which was now noticeably higher in pitch.

The Channel 3 look was dropped on 19 January 1998, following Granada's acquisition of Yorkshire-Tyne Tees Television on 26 June 1997, with the look returning to a spinning chevron against a misty blue background, light blue during the day and dark blue in the evenings.

On 8 November 1999, Yorkshire Television adopted the second generic look, based on the theme of hearts, which was used for the entirety of the branding period before network programming. However, for local programming, Yorkshire created their own ident featuring a background of spinning chevrons, with pictures of the region featuring inside a central box.

=== 2000s ===
A 2001–2 ident, featuring the region's familiar logo

The ITV Yorkshire logo used from 2006 to 2013.

On 28 October 2002, the brand was dropped in favour of a national ITV1 identity, in which local regional identities were dropped except before local programming, when the Yorkshire name appeared below the ITV1 logo only. These regional idents however were dropped by 2006.

=== Continuity announcers ===
- Redvers Kyle (1968–1993)
- Bob Preedy (late 1980s – 2002)
- John Crosse (senior announcer, early 1970s – 1998)
- Graham Roberts (c. 1970s – 1993)
- Kerrie Gosney (2000–2002)
- Earl Richmond (1968 – c.1970s)
- Neil Didsbury (2001–2002)
- Pete Haslam (promo voiceover and continuity announcer, 1999 – c.2007)
- Peter Lewis (late 1960s)
- Keith Martin
- Maggie Mash (1988–2002)
- Nick Oliver
- Karen Petch (deceased)
- Paul Lally (c.1968 – 1990s)
- Ian de Stains (1968–1970)
- Paul Kaye (c.1970s – 1980)
- Helen Aitken (1995–2002)
- Roger Tilling (1998–2002)
- Colin Weston (freelancer)
- Stephen Whitlock (1992–2004)

== Programming ==
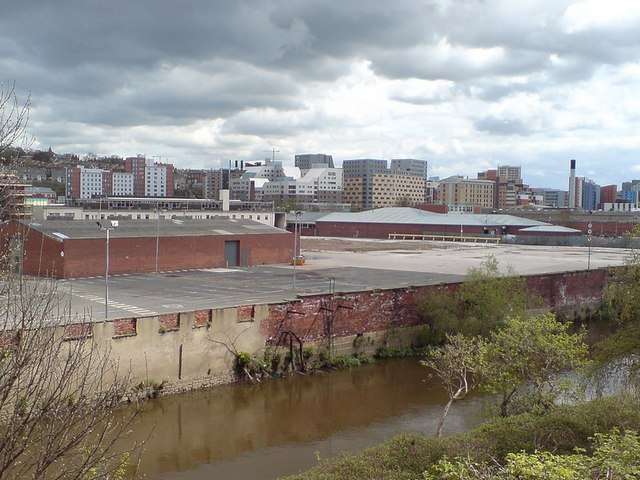
The former Arla Foods site, Kirkstall Road, occasionally a YTV filming location.

As one of the "Big Five" franchises, Yorkshire was a major producer within the ITV network and produced programming in all genres. The presenter Alan Whicker became a shareholder in the company at its inception and made many programmes for the station, most notably interviews with the Cat's Eye inventor Percy Shaw and the Haiti dictator Baby Doc Duvalier.

=== Drama/Serial ===
In Drama, Yorkshire Television had many critical successes, including:

- 15: The Life and Death of Philip Knight
- 1914 All Out
- A Bit of a Do
- A Is for Acid
- A Pinch of Snuff
- A Touch of Frost
- At Home with the Braithwaites
- Black Velvet Band
- Beecham
- Chiller
- Circles of Deceit
- Cloud Waltzer
- Dickens of London
- Demob
- Ellington
- Emmerdale
- Fat Friends
- Flambards
- Flying Lady
- Gazette
- Hadleigh
- Harry's Game
- Heartbeat
- Hunting Venus
- Imogen's Face
- Lost for Words
- Love with a Perfect Stranger
- March in Windy City
- May We Borrow Your Husband?
- Micawber
- Mother's Day
- My Uncle Silas
- Neville's Island
- Paparazzo
- Parkin's Patch
- Rich Tea and Sympathy
- Shipman
- Shoot to Kill
- Stalag Luft
- Stay Lucky
- Steel River Blues
- Strike Force
- Supply and Demand
- The Beiderbecke Trilogy
- The Booze Cruise
- The Brides in the Bath
- The Cater Street Hangman
- The Darling Buds of May
- The Dying of the Light
- The Flint Street Nativity
- The Glory Boys
- The Governor
- The Lady's Not for Burning
- The Life and Crimes of William Palmer
- The Main Chance
- The Organization
- The Outsider
- The Quest
- The Racing Game
- The Royal
- The Royal Today
- The Sandbaggers
- The Wanderer
- The World of Eddie Weary
- Tears in the Rain
- Till We Meet Again
- Tom Grattan's War
- Trial & Retribution
- Verdict
- West of Paradise
- Yellowthread Street

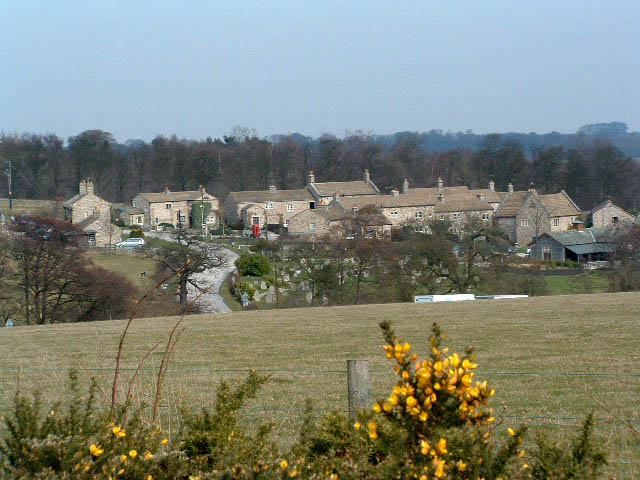
Emmerdale village built by YTV in 1997 for filming.

In 1969, YTV launched its first soap opera Castle Haven which was cancelled after only a year. When the restrictions on daytime broadcasting were relaxed, and on 16 October 1972 it launched an afternoon drama/soap opera called Emmerdale Farm, (which is still being broadcast as Emmerdale).

=== Comedy/Sitcom ===
In comedy (and in sitcom), Yorkshire TV produced many popular shows, including:

- Albert and Victoria
- All Change
- All Our Saturdays
- Beryl's Lot
- Dawson's Weekly
- Dear Mother...Love Albert
- Don't Ask Me
- Downwardly Mobile
- Duty Free
- Farrington of the F.O.
- Fiddlers Three
- Good Girl
- Haggard
- Hallelujah!
- High & Dry
- His And Hers
- Home to Roost
- How's Your Father?
- In Loving Memory
- Inside George Webley
- Jokers Wild
- Langley Bottom
- Life Begins at Forty
- Margie and Me
- Mr Digby Darling
- My Husband and I
- My Old Man
- No Strings
- Oh No It's Selwyn Froggitt
- On the House
- Only When I Laugh
- Plaza Patrol
- Queenie's Castle
- Rising Damp
- Room at the Bottom
- See You Friday
- Shine a Light
- Singles
- Sir Yellow
- That's My Boy
- The Bounder
- The Darling Buds of May
- The Gaffer
- The Gingerbread Girl
- The Nesbitts Are Coming
- The New Statesman
- There Comes A Time
- Thicker Than Water
- Third Time Lucky
- Thundercloud
- TV Squash
- You're Only Young Twice

This side (and department) of Yorkshire Television, also gave the comedian Les Dawson his first major series.

This line-up of sitcoms (and comedy series) also made various household names of well-known faces of British Television, especially in UK sitcom too.

=== Children ===
For children, YTV contributed many networked shows, including:

- Animal Kwackers
- Adam's Family Tree
- Bad Influence!
- Bellamy's Bugle
- Benny
- Charlie's Climbing Tree
- Doris
- Eastern Tales
- Follyfoot
- Get Up and Go!
- Gideon
- Heggerty Haggerty
- Junior Showtime
- Just Us
- Little Blue
- Mathematical Eye (1988 - 1993)
- Mister Trimble
- My Parents Are Aliens
- Puddle Lane
- Ragdolly Anna
- Round the Bend
- Stepping Stones
- Stories of Snowy and Buttercup Buskers
- Teetime and Claudia
- The Big Bang
- The Book Tower
- The Flaxton Boys
- The Giddy Game Show
- The New Addams Family
- The Raggy Dolls
- The Riddlers
- The Wanderer
- Toucan Tecs
- Tumbledown Farm
- Utterly Brilliant
- Wilmot
- The Woofits

as well as the long-running How We Used To Live for ITV's Schools and Colleges' output.

=== Entertainment/Game shows ===
In entertainment, YTV had also produced a large number of networked quiz shows, including:

- 3-2-1 (1978–88)
- Ask No Questions (1986–87)
- Bruce's Price is Right (1995–2001)
- Casino
- Countdown (for Channel 4)
- Fun and Games' (1985–1992)
- Raise the Roof (1995–96)
- Talkabout
- Tarby's Frame Game
- The Indoor League
- Time Please (1990–92)
- Winner Takes All

YTV has also produced some religious shows, including Stars on Sunday.

=== Broadcasting ===
The company invested heavily in outside broadcast facilities and was a large contributor to ITV Sport, responsible primarily for covering northern-based horserace meetings (with London Weekend Television and Thames Television covering the south and ATV covering the Midlands) amongst other sporting events.

In the field of investigative journalism the station soon gained an international reputation for award-winning documentaries: 1975 saw the transmission of the BAFTA award-winning Johnny Go Home, a startling exposé of teenage male prostitution and homelessness in London. In the same year the station transmitted Too Long a Winter (also a BAFTA award-winner), featuring Yorkshire Daleswoman Hannah Hauxwell who lived an austere and harsh life whilst running her small farm.

In 1979 the documentary Rampton: The Secret Hospital, making public the treatment of patients at the Nottinghamshire mental care facility Rampton Hospital, led to a Government investigation – it also won an international Emmy award for the station. Another 1979 documentary The Underground Eiger detailed the record-breaking cave dive of Oliver Statham and Geoff Yeadon. The 1989 documentary Four Hours in My Lai (broadcast as part of the monthly First Tuesday strand) revealed new information about the 1968 massacre. Yorkshire Television also produced the 1989 documentary One Day in the Life of Television.

YTV often led the way in British commercial broadcasting. As well as building the first purpose-built colour studios on Europe it was the first to offer breakfast television. In 1977, the station took part in a nine-week trial offering viewers an extra hour of programming at breakfast time, beginning transmission at 8:30 am with a 15-minute national and regional news bulletin called Good Morning Calendar alongside cartoons and episodes of Peyton Place. A similar experiment was carried out by Tyne Tees Television around the same time.

In August 1986, it became the first terrestrial station in Britain to offer 24-hour television. This was achieved by simulcasting the satellite station Music Box from around midnight to the start of TV-am's transmission. Both YTV and Music Box were partly owned by the same company (Thorn EMI). The experiment ended shortly before Music Box closed down in January 1987 and was replaced by a teletext-based Jobfinder service which broadcast for one hour after closedown. YTV re-introduced 24-hour programming 18 months later along with the rest of the ITV network, beginning full-time 24-hour broadcasting on 30 May 1988.

In the mid-1980s, Yorkshire broke from the network by refusing to screen the BAFTA Awards, claiming them to be slaps on the backs of the BBC. The film The Sting was a replacement in 1986. As the rest of the network overran in the live BAFTA screening, Yorkshire had to cobble together minor programmes until other regions were able to screen the late-running ITN News. In the 1990s, while Bruce Gyngell was managing director, Yorkshire declined to show several late-night programmes, including The Good Sex Guide. One such series, Hollywood Lovers, was replaced with Alan Whicker repeats.

== Yorkshire Television subsidiaries ==
Yorkshire Television had its own record label, York Records. One of the Yorkshire shows that had a theme released on their label was The Sky's the Limit which was hosted by Hughie Green. The theme "The Sky's the Limit" was the B side to "Any Minute of Your Life" (York SYK 501), a single by the group Simplicity which included Bradford musician Roger Davis in its ranks.

ITV regional service
Preceded by Granada Television	Yorkshire (weekdays); 29 July 1968 – present	Current provider as ITV Yorkshire
Preceded by ABC Weekend TV	Yorkshire (weekends); 3 August 1968 – present	Current provider as ITV Yorkshire
Preceded by Anglia Television	Lincolnshire & East Yorkshire; 1 January 1974 – present	Current provider as ITV Yorkshire
Preceded by Anglia Television	North Norfolk coast 1 January 1974 – 24 January 1980	Succeeded by Anglia Television
