= Independent Television Commission =

Former British commercial television regulator

- Abbreviation: ITC
- Predecessor: Independent Broadcasting Authority
- Successor: Ofcom
- Formation: 1 January 1991
- Defunct: 28 December 2003
- Type: Statutory corporation
- Legal status: Created by Broadcasting Act 1990
- Purpose: Regulator and competition authority for broadcasting, telecommunications and radiocommunications spectrum
- Headquarters: London, England
- Location: London, Belfast, Cardiff, Caterham, Glasgow, Newton-le-Willows
- Region served: United Kingdom
- Official language: English, Welsh

The Independent Television Commission (ITC) licensed and regulated commercial television services in the United Kingdom (except S4C in Wales) between 1 January 1991 and 28 December 2003.

== History ==
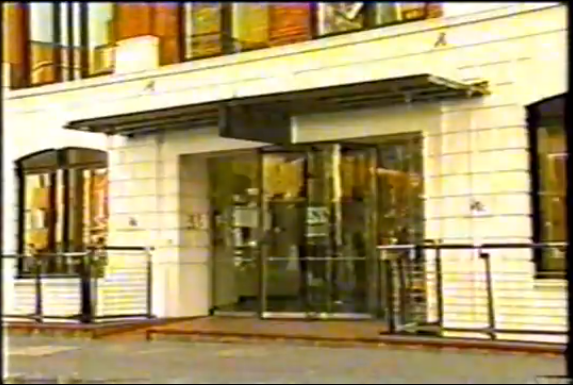
ITC's former headquarters, now occupied by Ofcom (note the former IBA signage was removed).

The creation of ITC, by the Broadcasting Act 1990 to replace the television regulation functions of the Independent Broadcasting Authority (formed by the Sound Broadcasting Act 1972) and Cable Authority. From 1 January 1991 it regulated the existing ITV network. The 1990 act also established the Channel Four Television Corporation to run Channel 4, regulated by the ITC. There was no fanfare, as control was passed from Channel Four Television Company Limited.

== Activities ==
The establishing act required the auction of Channel 3 licences for the fifteen ITV regions and nationwide breakfast time. Most of the Channel 3 licences were awarded to the incumbent ITV companies; however there were some controversial decisions:

- Carlton Television outbid Thames Television for the London Weekday licence; CPV-TV was the highest bidder, but its bid failed due to quality considerations.
- GMTV (changed to Good Morning Television as the bid name 'Sunrise Television' was already used by Sky News) outbid TV-am for the Breakfast television licence.
- TVS and TSW were deemed to have overbid for their licences, and hence their franchises were awarded to lower bidders Meridian Broadcasting and Westcountry Television, respectively.

On 1 January 1993 these new arrangements came into force, and the ITC began its job of 'light-touch regulation'. During this time, the ITC regulated the Channel 3 system as well as Channel 4. It issued licences to new satellite broadcasters and awarded the Channel 5 licence in the mid-1990s. It also regulated cable TV.

In the early 2000s, the British government, in a white paper, declared its intention to merge the ITC with the Radio Authority, Office of Telecommunications, and Radiocommunications Agency. This merger, under the Communications Act 2003, took effect on 29 December 2003. Most powers of the ITC are now exercised by the Office of Communications (Ofcom), making some powers – and the ITC itself – defunct.

== Chairman ==
George Russell, last chairman of IBA

- Sir George Russell (1 Jan 1991 – 31 Dec 1996)
- Sir Robin Biggam (1 Jan 1997 – 28 Dec 2003)

== The ITC's co-regulators and origins ==
=== Timeline of communications regulators (1953–present) ===
* Ministry of Posts and Telecommunications

Alongside the ITC, two other independent bodies also dealt with complaints: the Broadcasting Complaints Commission dealt with injustices against individuals, whereas the Broadcasting Standards Council dealt with complaints about the moral content of programs, with no redress for individuals.

Historically, all of independent television (from 22 September 1955) and radio (from 8 October 1973) was governed by the IBA (Independent Broadcasting Authority) – joined by the Cable Authority in 1984. On 1 July 1985, the Home Secretary asked the IBA to review prospects for commercial DBS.

In 1988, the Broadcasting Standards Council was set up to monitor 'taste and decency' on television. In 1990, large-scale changes brought about the Radio Authority, the privatization of the IBA's engineering division as NTL, and formation of the Independent Television Commission.

Since its formation, the BBC has been primarily responsible for its own governance - initially through the Corporation's Board of Governors and since 1 January 2007 through the BBC Trust.

Communications regulation
Preceded by Independent Broadcasting Authority	Regulation of ITV; 1 January 1991 – 28 December 2003	Succeeded by Ofcom
Preceded by Independent Broadcasting Authority	Regulation of Channel 4; 1 January 1991 – 28 December 2003	Succeeded by Ofcom
Preceded by Independent Broadcasting Authority	Regulation of Satellite Television; 1 January 1991 – 28 December 2003	Succeeded by Ofcom
Preceded by Cable Authority	Regulation of Cable Television; 1 January 1991 – 28 December 2003	Succeeded by Ofcom
New creation	Regulation of Channel 5; 30 March 1997 – 28 December 2003	Succeeded by Ofcom

== See also ==
- Ofcom Code on Sports and Other Listed and Designated Events
