= Bruce Gyngell =

Australian television executive

Bruce Gyngell AO
- Born: 8 July 1929; Melbourne, Victoria, Australia
- Died: 7 September 2000 (aged 71); Chelsea, London, England
- Occupations: Australian television executive, former radio broadcaster
- Years active: 1956–2000
- Spouse(s): Ann Barr (m. 1957–1983); Kathy Gyngell (m. 1986–)
- Children: 5, including Skye and David

Bruce Gyngell AO (8 July 1929 – 7 September 2000) was an Australian television executive, active for more than 40 years in both Australian and UK television. Although Gyngell began his career in radio, in the 1950s he stepped into the arena of early television broadcasting, helping to set up Channel 9 Sydney, the first commercial TV station in Australia. He was managing director of the breakfast television franchise holder TV-am in the United Kingdom from 1984 to 1992.

In later life, he expressed an attraction to eastern ideas which ranged through Zen Buddhism, meditation and Insight philosophy.

== Early life ==
Gyngell was born on 8 July 1929 in Melbourne. According to The Guardian, among Gyngell's relatives were multiple entrepreneurs. His great-grandfather was the pyrotechnician for the wedding of Queen Victoria and Prince Albert, while his grandfather, who settled in Australia, introduced cider-making to the continent. His father ran a flying circus before becoming an engineer with Mobil, and his mother was of Irish extraction.

He was a pupil at Sydney Grammar School and briefly studied medicine. He worked as a disc jockey for the ABC, and joined the University Air Squadron but the Korean War ended before he had a chance to participate.

== Career ==
Gyngell's media career began in the record industry, in the mid-1950s, when he was hired by Australian label Festival Records. He was soon poached by Sir Frank Packer, who hired him to assist in the establishment of TCN-9, Australia's first commercial television station, in 1956. Gyngell is often credited as being the first person to appear on Australian television on 16 September 1956, when he spoke the words, "Good evening, and welcome to television". He was also the country's first television quiz host. However, many people (possibly several hundred) had already appeared in television test broadcasts in Australia prior to Gyngell, including performer Alan Rowe, comedy duo 'Ada & Elsie', 'Happy' Hammond, and Graham Kennedy.

From 1964, Gyngell became the managing director of Nine Network before switching to the Seven Network in 1969. In 1972, he became deputy chairman of ATV in the United Kingdom and also became Chairman of the ITV network planning committee from 1974-1976. Lord Grade refused to make him company chairman, so Gyngell left ATV in 1976 to become an independent producer, but within a year, he became the first chairman of the Australian Broadcasting Tribunal (later the Australian Broadcasting Authority) in 1977. He was the first chief executive of Australia's Channel 0 (now the Special Broadcasting Service or SBS) from 1980. Under his rule, its ratings were starting to rise; largely due to ethnic-based programming or due to its news operation. By the time Gyngell left 0-28 for London in late 1982, the channel was being plagued by repeats.

Gyngell returned to the United Kingdom, where he became managing director at TV-am between Spring 1984 and 1992 and is credited with introducing the sofa format of breakfast television. The new franchise holder's launch in 1983 was a fiasco and he rescued the company, then losing £500,000 a month, from becoming bankrupt. Kerry Packer's Consolidated Press had a large stake in the business and it was at the insistence of Packer that Gyngell assumed the position. During a technicians' strike over pay, 390 employees were locked out of the building and 200 of them were eventually sacked. Over a three-month period, managers became cameramen and 50 journalists were relocated to New York for the news service. The UK Conservative government introduced legislation which inadvertently led to the demise of TV-am; Gyngell received a personal letter of apology from Prime Minister Margaret Thatcher.

He returned to Australia in 1993 as chief executive of Nine. In 1995, Gyngell was asked by company chairman Ward Thomas to join Yorkshire Television (which, after taking over Tyne Tees Television, had become 'Yorkshire-Tyne Tees Television'). In 1996, Gyngell oversaw the rebranding of Tyne Tees to "Channel 3 North East", with Yorkshire adopting some elements of the "Channel 3" branding, and had intended to gradually roll out the "Channel 3" brand across the ITV network. On the station, an ITV franchise holder, Gyngell refused to run late-night programmes carried elsewhere on the network such as Hollywood Lovers which featured segments on such issues as genital plastic surgery. Yorkshire had itself contributed £120,000 to its production budget, but he found the explicit content objectionable. Gyngell stayed with the company until 1997 when it was taken over by Granada, who ultimately dropped the "Channel 3" branding from both channels in 1998, and revived the "Tyne Tees Television" name.

Gyngell repeated his opening night words upon the opening of the Special Broadcasting Service in 1980, and again in 1995, when cable television brought along Optus Television. He was the founder of the Nine Network's music-variety program, Bandstand, which he had adapted from the US programme American Bandstand.

== Personal life ==
Gyngell followed a macrobiotic diet in his later life.

Gyngell married twice and had five children. His first marriage was to Ann Barr, an interior designer, with whom he had three children: designer Briony Gyngell, restaurateur and chef Skye Gyngell, and Nine Network CEO David Gyngell, who is married to Leila McKinnon. In 1986, he married Kathy Rowan, a TV-am producer. The couple had two sons, Adam and Jamie.

== Death ==
Gyngell died at the age of 71, on 7 September 2000 in Chelsea, London, from lung cancer; he did not smoke. Upon Gyngell's death, the Prime Minister of Australia John Howard paid tribute to him, saying, "It's a big loss to the Australian television industry. In a way, he probably contributed more to the industry than just about any other Australian."

== Filmography ==
- Name That Tune (1956)
