= CPV-TV =

Failed bidder for 1991 ITV franchises

CPV-TV (from Chrysalis, Paradine and Virgin) was a company which had bid for three ITV franchises at the 1991 ITV franchise auctions.

It was a consortium led by Sir David Frost and Richard Branson with further backing from the Chrysalis Group media business and had bid for the East of England, London Weekday and the South and South East England franchises which were then held by Anglia Television, Thames Television and Television South respectively. The intention of the consortium was to create a centralised service for these three franchises with a generic presentation package.

However it was unsuccessful with all of its bids. It was outbid by Anglia and Meridian Broadcasting in the East of England and South East England areas and for the London Weekday franchise it lost out to Carlton Communications despite making the highest bid; the bid failed on grounds of quality. CPV-TV's London Weekday bid amount was £45,319,000.
