= Yorkshire-Tyne Tees Television =

Former British broadcasting company

- Logo used from 1992 – 1994.
- Company type: Private
- Industry: Media
- Predecessor: Yorkshire Television; Tyne Tees Television
- Founded: June 1992; 33 years ago
- Defunct: June 26, 1997; 28 years ago
- Fate: Acquired by Granada Media Group
- Area served: Yorkshire; Lincolnshire; Derbyshire (parts); Nottinghamshire (parts); County Durham; Northumberland (majority); Teesside; Tyne and Wear; North Yorkshire (part); Cumbria (Alston area)
- Products: Broadcasting

Yorkshire-Tyne Tees Television was a British broadcasting company, which is now part of ITV plc.

== History ==
The company was created in June 1992 from the merger of the Independent Television broadcasters Yorkshire Television and Tyne Tees Television in England, United Kingdom. YTT was effected by the overbidding for its franchises in 1992. The company lost £7.9m in 1993, compared with a pretax profit of £16.7m in 1992. Yorkshire Television founder, Ward Thomas was recalled from retirement to change the company's fortunes in and around 1994, the company managed profits of £10.5m for a 15-month period, reflecting the changed year-end. Bruce Gyngell, the former chairman of breakfast station TV-am, became YTT's managing director on 15 May 1995.

In 1974 Yorkshire and Tyne Tees had previously been taken over by Trident Television, as a joint holding company, to allocate advertising revenue from the Bilsdale transmitter which covered part of both areas. They were forced to de-merge by the IBA in 1980. The Broadcasting Act 1990 allowed ITV contractors to merge again.

The company was purchased by Granada Media Group on 26 June 1997, GMG having been formed by a merger between Granada Television and London Weekend Television. In February 2004, Granada plc ultimately went on to merge with Carlton Communications, forming ITV plc. The takeover of Yorkshire-Tyne Tees Television was thought to be worth about £800m. Three months later, Bruce Gyngell left the company in September 1997.

Yorkshire-Tyne Tees Television, along with Welsh franchisee HTV, later challenged a government plan for all ITV companies to be required to use a single supplier of television news. It also asked for a vote among ITV companies over whether News at Ten should be moved to another time.
