= Trident Television =

Defunct British holding company

- Type: Holding company
- Industry: Television production, Leisure
- Founded: August 1970
- Defunct: 1992
- Fate: Merged with Grand Metropolitan
- Area served: United Kingdom
- Key people: Richard Graham (chairman); Ward Thomas (managing director); James Hanson

Trident Television Limited was a British holding company with broadcasting interests. It was created to sell airtime for two ITV regions, Yorkshire Television and Tyne Tees Television, and later took over both companies. Trident acquired Halas and Batchelor, Scarborough Zoo, Windsor Safari Park, the British Playboy Clubs, The Clermont, the London Vic Casino, Trident Casinos and Trident Holdings (Australia Pty Ltd).

== History ==
Trident was set up in August 1970 to deal with the problem of fairly allocating commercial airtime from a television transmitter at Bilsdale in North Yorkshire which straddled the catchment areas of two Independent Television (ITV) companies. The transmitter itself was owned by the Independent Television Authority (ITA), the governing body of ITV. Due to the geographical nature of the area it served, allocating the transmitter to either of the two closest broadcasting companies, Yorkshire Television and Tyne Tees Television, would have given one an advantage over the other in terms of selling commercial airtime. The solution was to create a holding company for the selling of airtime in both television regions but with each company retaining its own separate identity and management control.

By October, the name "Trident" was chosen, while share holders in Yorkshire had agreed to the merger, with Yorkshire Chairman Sir Richard Graham becoming Trident chairman and Yorkshire Managing Director Ward Thomas becoming MD at Trident. Three other Yorkshire TV directors and Telefusion's John Wilkinson and James Hanson made up the Trident board.

The creation of the company created the second largest ITV sale area with 16%. Although Yorkshire had engaged in discussions with Anglia Television in early 1969 over shared use of outside broadcast units and regional offices as a cost-cutting measure, Anglia were never considered as potential partners for the new holding companies' interests. The third 'prong of the trident' therefore became the non-television interests of the company. However, in separate developments the Belmont transmitter was reallocated to Yorkshire in 1974.

On 1 January 1974, a reverse takeover of both YTV and Tyne Tees was performed by Trident. Plans to rename the stations 'Trident Yorkshire' and 'Trident Tyne-Tees' were vetoed by the Independent Broadcasting Authority. Pre-tax profit rose to £2.76 million, with profits rising again to £4.82 million in 1976, and increasing once more to £7.355 million in 1977.

In 1977, the group expand into other remits with the purchase of Windsor Safari park for £3 million, before it was sold on in 1984. In 1979, Trident Television launched an American-based New York headquarter distribution company called Trident Television Associates, which was led by Elliot Abrams and Arthur Zeiger. It struck a deal with CBS to license 23 telemovies to the company for use in syndication.

== Australian subsidiary ==
During 1975, Trident acquired Australia Pty Ltd, after helping creating Luke's Kingdom In August 1978, Group sold off its 77% stake in Australian subsidiary of Trident Television plc (Australia Pty Ltd), to Visionshire pty for £3.4 million. It was hinted during much of 1978 plans were afoot to sell the loss-making company on.

== De-merger ==
In December 1980, both Yorkshire Television and Tyne Tees Television had their contracts renewed but were forced to de-merge by the IBA. The de-merger meant Trident's participation in ITV was effectively over. It continued to retain minority shareholdings in both companies which were eventually disposed of. Although it continued to receive rental funds from the studios and equipment leased to the two companies, it no longer earned funds from selling airtime.

The company then moved into the leisure and gaming industries, owning (amongst others) Windsor Safari Park, several London casinos and, for a short while, a chain of betting shops. In 1982 it merged with the leisure and brewing giant Grand Metropolitan.

In 1992, Yorkshire and Tyne Tees merged again, to create Yorkshire-Tyne Tees Television.
