= David Gyngell =

Australian businessman (born 1966)

CEO of Nine Network
- In office 25 September 2007 – 4 November 2013
- Preceded by: Eddie McGuire
- Succeeded by: Position dissolved

CEO of Nine Entertainment Co.
- In office 4 November 2013 – 10 November 2015
- Succeeded by: Hugh Marks

Personal details
- Born: David Liam Barr Gyngell; 1966 (age 59–60) Australia
- Spouse: Leila McKinnon (m. 2004)
- Parent: Bruce Gyngell (father)
- Relatives: Skye Gyngell (sister); Kim Gyngell (second cousin)
- Occupation: Television executive

David Liam Barr Gyngell (born 1966), an Australian businessman, was the former chief executive officer of Nine Entertainment Co. which owns a string of businesses including the Nine Network and Nine Radio.

Gyngell was the CEO of the Nine Network before resigning in May 2005. After a period of declining ratings compared to Channel Seven, he returned to the job in September 2007, succeeding Eddie McGuire. In November 2013, he was appointed as the CEO of Nine Entertainment Co. He resigned as CEO in 2015, and was replaced by Hugh Marks.

== Personal life ==
Gyngell is the son of Australian television pioneer Bruce Gyngell and the best man and former flatmate of James Packer, whom he first met at Cranbrook School, the former owner of the Nine Network. In 2004, he married journalist and presenter Leila McKinnon. Gyngell's second cousin is Kim Gyngell.

In May 2014, Gyngell was involved in a public brawl with Packer at Bondi Beach. A spokesperson for Gyngell subsequently released a statement saying "he was the instigator of the incident. Had he not turned up at Packer's premises in an angry mood then the confrontation would never have occurred". Gyngell and Packer were both fined $500 for offensive behaviour over the incident.
