= Skye Gyngell =

Australian chef (1963–2025)

- Born: 6 September 1963; Sydney, New South Wales, Australia
- Died: 22 November 2025 (aged 62); London, England
- Spouse: Thomas Gore (m. 1989; div. 1996)
- Father: Bruce Gyngell
- Relatives: David Gyngell (brother); Kim Gyngell (second cousin)
- Culinary career
- Cooking style: European cuisine
- Rating
- Michelin stars (2011)
- Previous restaurant
- Petersham Nurseries Café
- Awards
- Best Cookery Book Guild of Food Writers Award 2007; Best UK Woman Chef Book Gourmand World Cookbook Award 2010

Skye Gyngell (6 September 1963 – 22 November 2025) was an Australian chef who was best known for her work as food editor for Vogue, and for winning a Michelin star at the Petersham Nurseries Café in London. She first trained as a chef in France, and afterwards moved to Britain.

== Early life ==
Gyngell was born in Sydney on 6 September 1963. Her father was Bruce Gyngell, an Australian television executive.

== Career ==
Gyngell trained at La Varenne restaurant in Paris, France, under chef Anne Willan. She then moved to work at the Dodin-Bouffant restaurant before going to work at the French House, Soho, in London. She went on to work at the Dorchester under Anton Mosimann. She cooked for dinner parties, including for celebrity chef Nigella Lawson.

She joined the Petersham Nurseries Café as head chef at its opening in 2004, having convinced the owners of the nurseries to allow her to create the "antithesis of a West End restaurant" there. The restaurant, set in the grounds of Petersham House, was awarded a Michelin star in the 2011 list, and she created a pop-up restaurant in London in conjunction with Cloudy Bay wines later in the year. After eight years at the Café, she left in 2012. In interviews she explained that she did not like the expectations that people had of a Michelin-starred restaurant and this led to her decision to quit, and described the star as a "curse", stating, "If I ever have another restaurant I pray we don't get a star." She explained later that she regretted her comments about the Michelin star, but thought that the set-up at Petersham just did not allow for the expectations of customers to be met, describing the facilities as "cooking out of a garage".

Later that year she announced a collaboration with Heckfield Place, and was named Culinary Director for the three restaurants there. In addition, she was being backed by the same investors to head a new restaurant in London. She had already said that she would not turn down a new star. She had declined offers to run the kitchens of Kensington Place restaurant and the café of the Serpentine Gallery.

In November 2014, she opened Spring, a restaurant at Somerset House, London. She wrote for The Independent on Sunday, and was the food editor for magazine Vogue.

== Personal life and death ==
Gyngell married Thomas Gore in 1989. The couple divorced in 1996. Gyngell had two children; one daughter, Holly Gore from her marriage with Gore, and another daughter, Evie Henderson, from a following relationship. She died of an aggressive form of skin cancer, Merkel-cell carcinoma, on 22 November 2025, at the age of 62.

== Published works ==
- Gyngell, Skye; Lowe, Jason (2006). A Year in My Kitchen. London: Quadrille. ISBN 978-1-84400-592-5.
- Gyngell, Skye (2008). My Favourite Ingredients. London: Quadrille Publishing. ISBN 978-1-58008-050-7.
- Gyngell, Skye (2010). How I Cook. London: Quadrille. ISBN 978-1-84400-850-6.
- Gyngell, Skye; Sewell, Andy (2016). Spring. London: Quadrill. ISBN 978-1-84949-754-1.
