= Ward Thomas (television executive) =

British television executive (1923–2019)

Ward Thomas, circa 1980s

Gwyn Edward "Ward" Thomas, CBE, DFC, CdeG (1 August 1923 – 4 February 2019) was a British television executive, who was at the forefront of independent television in the UK from the 1960s through to the mid-1990s. He was CEO of Grampian Television (1961–67) and managing director and chairman of Yorkshire Television (1967–76, 1993–97), and chairman of Trident Television (1976–84).

== Early life, WWII and Motor Racing ==
Ward Thomas was born in Wimbledon, London, the only child of Constance Thomas (née Daborn; 1900–97) and William Thomas. He was educated at Bloxham School, Oxfordshire (1935-9). He spent a year abroad at the Lycée in Rouen until the German invasion of France in May 1940, when he had to escape on the ferry from Saint-Malo.

Ward Thomas joined RAF Bomber Command in 1941 and trained as a navigator and pilot in South Africa. He joined 100 Squadron as a Lancaster pilot and was later moved to 550 Squadron stationed in Grimsby. He flew 36 trips over France and Germany over the course of the war, including taking part in the Nuremberg raid of March 1944 during which Bomber Command suffered its heaviest loses. He was awarded the Croix de Guerre for his involvement in bombing raids on the German Panzer training camp at Mailly-le-Camp in advance of the Normandy landings in June 1944. He also received the DFC "for utmost fortitude, courage and devotion to duty in air operations" during the War. By the time he left the RAF Ward Thomas had achieved the rank of flight lieutenant.

Ward Thomas left the RAF in 1946 and moved to Switzerland in 1947 to fly for Swissair.

On his return to the UK in 1951, Ward Thomas was actively involved in motor racing in the UK and Europe. He won the Brands Hatch championship in May 1952 and the Prix de la Province de Namur (Belgium) competing against Stirling Moss in July of the same year. As a result of his performances he won membership of the British Racing Drivers' Club.

== Career ==
=== Grampian Television (1961—1967) ===
After beginning his television career at Granada Television as an air-time salesman, Ward Thomas was part of the consortium bidding for the Grampian Television franchise in North East Scotland. Ward Thomas was initially appointed as Sales Director, but took over from Edward O'Donnell as CEO Shortly after the company opened After 6 months of operation Ward Thomas fought a successful battle against the unions who had demanded major changes to the company's structure. In a bold move, Ward Thomas threatened to close the station down if staff backed the union proposal, at which point it was overruled.

=== Yorkshire Television (1967—1971) ===
Ward Thomas successfully led the bid for the Yorkshire Television (YTV) franchise in 1967. YTV went on the air in 1968 with Ward Thomas as Managing Director. After only a year of being on air, Ward Thomas had to steer the company through the potentially disastrous collapse of its only broadcasting transmitter on Emley Moor. This left the company facing potential losses of £500,000 per month, but a temporary mast was installed after only four days and a mast bought from Sweden became operational just four weeks later. This swift action limited total losses to only £250,000.

=== Trident Television & Casinos (1971—1984) ===
Trident Television was formed in 1971 as holding company of YTV and Tyne Tees TV (TTTV) with Ward Thomas as managing director and deputy chairman (becoming chairman in 1976). Anglia Television was also supposed to form part of the group (making up the third spur of the trident) but its inclusion was blocked by the Independent Broadcasting Authority (IBA). During this period, Yorkshire produced some of the UK's most successful TV programmes under the stewardship of Head of Programmes Donald Baverstock (1967–73) and later Paul Fox (1973–86). Among them Emmerdale Farm, Rising Damp and Whicker's World.

At the 1980 round of television franchise renewals, the Independent Broadcasting Authority (IBA) forced Trident to devolve its television companies; with the proceeds of the sale of YTV and TTTV, Trident purchased Playboy Casinos from Hugh Hefner's Playboy Enterprises for £14.6m and formed Trident Casinos. The deal included the Playboy Club, the Clermont Club and the Victoria Sporting Club in London as well as the chain of Playboy betting shops (these were later sold off for £6.2m). The Village Club and the Connoisseur Casinos were added to the group in 1982 for £2.6M. In addition to its Casinos, Trident also owned Windsor Safari Park.

Ward Thomas retired from Trident Casinos in 1984 after the company made its highest ever pre-tax profits of £10.3m in 1983. He retired from Trident in 1984, stating that he did not wish to spend the rest of his career in the gaming business.

=== Return to Yorkshire/Tyne Tees Television (1993—1997) ===
Ward Thomas came out of retirement and returned to the Chairmanship of YTV in November 1993 after the company ran into difficulties under the stewardship of Clive Leach. YTV's difficulties stemmed from overselling air-time to advertisers in 1992-3, this had to be honoured in the following year forcing the company to make provisions of £20.2m to cover the debt. When these resulted in pre-tax losses for the year of £7.9m, Ward Thomas was recalled from retirement to steer the company out of its predicament. Upon his return to Yorkshire Ward Thomas demanded Clive Leach's resignation, proposed that the board waive all management bonuses and embarked on a programme of cost-cutting which returned the broadcaster to profit by the end of 1994. In 1995, Ward Thomas appointed Bruce Gyngell as managing director. Having been brought in initially as a temporary measure to stabilise the company, Ward Thomas announced in March 1996 that the board had asked him to continue his time at the helm.

In June 1997, after a long period of corporate courtship, Ward Thomas convinced shareholders to accept a bid of £711m for YTV from Granada plc and the broadcasting franchise was sold. Ward Thomas had always advocated merging the ITV regional franchises into a single entity for efficiency reasons and with the sale of YTV to Granada this was brought one step closer to reality. Having initially been offered the Chairmanship of Granada's Media division, Ward Thomas instead decided to retire at the age of 74.

He also became non-executive chairman at Irving International, a media consultancy company.

== Personal life ==
Ward Thomas was married twice. First to Patricia Cornelius with whom he had one daughter. His second marriage was to Janice Patricia Topp with whom he had one son.
