= List of years in British television =

This page indexes the individual year in British television pages. Each year is annotated with a significant event as a reference point.

== 1920s ==
- 1926 in British television – John Logie Baird demonstrates the world's first television system.
- 1927 in British television – The BBC begins broadcasting as the British Broadcasting Corporation under the royal charter.
- 1928 in British television – John Logie Baird's Television Development Company demonstrates their model A, B, and C 'televisors' to the general public.
- 1929 in British television – John Logie Baird begins broadcasting 30-minute-long programmes for his mechanically scanned televisions.

== 1930s ==
- 1930 in British television – John Logie Baird installs a television receiver at the British Prime Minister's residence in London.
- 1931 in British television
- 1932 in British television – BBC Television begins broadcasting a regular channel, which later becomes BBC One.
- 1933 in British television – The first television revue, Looking In, is shown on the BBC
- 1934 in British television – The agreement for joint experimental transmissions by the BBC and John Logie Baird's company comes to an end.
- 1935 in British television – Baird stops broadcasting in September.
- 1936 in British television – Electronically scanned television begins from Alexandra Palace.
- 1937 in British television – First outside broadcast at the Coronation of King George VI.
- 1938 in British television – First news bulletin carried by BBC television, in sound only. Previously, the service had aired British Movietone News cinema newsreels.
- 1939 in British television – Television broadcasts are suspended during World War II for fear that the signals would help German bombers.

== 1940s ==
- 1940 in British television – No television is broadcast during World War II.
- 1941 in British television – No television is broadcast during World War II.
- 1942 in British television – No television is broadcast during World War II.
- 1943 in British television – No television is broadcast during World War II.
- 1944 in British television – No television is broadcast during World War II.
- 1945 in British television – No television is broadcast during World War II. World War II ends on 2 September.
- 1946 in British television – The BBC resumes broadcasting for the first time since the end of World War II.
- 1947 in British television – The BBC Television Service broadcasts are temporarily suspended since World War II due to a national fuel crisis.
- 1948 in British television – The BBC Television Service resumes broadcasting again and begins its coverage of the Olympic Games in London.
- 1949 in British television – The Sutton Coldfield television transmitter is opened in the Midlands, making it the first part of the UK outside London to receive BBC Television and long-running dancing show Come Dancing launches.

== 1950s ==
- 1950 in British television – First televised report of general election results in the UK.
- 1951 in British television – The Holme Moss transmitter is opened in Northern England, making BBC Television available to the region for the first time.
- 1952 in British television – The funeral of King George VI is televised in the UK.
- 1953 in British television – The coronation of Elizabeth II of the United Kingdom sees a vast increase in television set sales.
- 1954 in British television – The Grove Family, regarded as Britain's first soap, begins airing.
- 1955 in British television – ITV launches, resulting in the destruction of the BBC's 23-year-long monopoly on British television.
- 1956 in British television – Hancock's Half Hour, regarded as the first modern sitcom which began on BBC Radio, is transferred to BBC television. ITV's Granada and ATV regions go on air during weekdays. The weekend franchise in both areas is operated by ABC Weekend TV.
- 1957 in British television – The Sky at Night, the longest-running television programme hosted by the same presenter, Patrick Moore, begins on the BBC. ITV's Scottish region goes on air.
- 1958 in British television – ITV's TWW and Southern regions go on air and Blue Peter, the world's longest-running children's programme, is first broadcast by the BBC along with long-running various sport show Grandstand.
- 1959 in British television – The first Vienna New Year's Concert to be broadcast on television is aired by the BBC. ITV's Anglia, Tyne Tees and Ulster regions go on air.

== 1960s ==
- 1960 in British television – The Pilkington Committee on Broadcasting is established to look at the future of broadcasting and paves the way for the establishment of soon to launch channel BBC Two. Coronation Street, Britain's longest-running television soap, debuts on ITV. Nan Winton becomes the first national female newsreader on BBC television.
- 1961 in British television – ITV's Westward, Border and Grampian regions are established. The Avengers and Points of View debut on British television.
- 1962 in British television – ITV finally arrives in North West Wales and the Channel Islands with the launch of Wales West and North Television and Channel Television and the satirical show That Was The Week That Was begins to run for only two series.
- 1963 in British television – The science fiction series Doctor Who is aired for the first time and the satirical show That Was The Week That Was comes to an end after series 2.
- 1964 in British television – BBC Two goes on the air and long-running football and music shows Top of the Pops and Match of the Day are both launched and Stingray begins on ITV.
- 1965 in British television – Cigarette advertising is banned on British television and ITV's Saturday afternoon World of Sport programme and popular Supermarionation, Thunderbirds both begin airing.
- 1966 in British television – Cathy Come Home, possibly the best-known play ever to be broadcast on British television, is presented in BBC One's The Wednesday Play anthology strand.
- 1967 in British television – BBC Two begins colour broadcasting at the Wimbledon Championships and Patrick McGoohan's cult television series The Prisoner debuts on ITV, along with Captain Scarlet and the Mysterons and News at Ten is also launched on ITV.
- 1968 in British television – Following franchise changes technical staff at ITV stage a strike, leading to ITV management establishing an emergency national service for the duration of the industrial action and popular BBC sitcom Dad's Army begins along with Joe 90.
- 1969 in British television – Where Were You On the Day War Broke Out? became a documentary TV Programme about when the BBC stopped broadcasting TV and carried on broadcasting radio, Regular colour television broadcasting begins on BBC One and ITV, and British viewers watches footage of the 1969 Moon landing. Popular ground-breaking sketch comedy Monty Python's Flying Circus debuts on BBC One.

== 1970s ==
- 1970 in British television – The BBC Nine O'Clock News goes on air for the first time and staff at ITV begin a three-month colour strike, making colour television programmes black & white like in previous years, after a dispute with their management over pay from 13 November of this year to February and December of the following year. The Goodies also debuts on BBC Two, as well as The Adventures of Rupert Bear.
- 1971 in British television – End of ITV's colour strike, Launch of the Old Grey Whistle Test, popular comedy show The Two Ronnies and the popular series Upstairs, Downstairs.
- 1972 in British television – First Community Cable Television Experiment awarded to Greenwich Cablevision. – Debut of BBC One's Newsround and ITV's Emmerdale Farm, both of which continue to air to the present day, and Rainbow.
- 1973 in British television – Debuts of Thames Television's critically acclaimed documentary series The World at War, and The Wombles on BBC Two.
- 1974 in British television – The BBC teletext service Ceefax first goes on air with 30 pages of information, and the Saturday morning children's entertainment series Tiswas is launched by ATV.
- 1975 in British television – The popular sitcom Fawlty Towers first appears along with The Good Life, Space 1999 and Paddington Bear on British television screens, as well as the police drama The Sweeney. 1975 also sees the first transmission of a James Bond film on British television.
- 1976 in British television – The Multicoloured Swap Shop opens on the BBC, Punk group the Sex Pistols cause a storm of controversy and outrage in the UK by swearing well before the watershed on the regional Thames Television news programme Today, hosted by Bill Grundy but Grundy, who has goaded them into doing so, is temporarily sacked making the news programme Today come to an end.
- 1977 in British television – Colour television licenses exceed black & white licenses and repeated black & white programmes for the first time in the UK since ITV's colour strike and Jesus of Nazareth, an Anglo-Italian television miniseries dramatizing the birth, life, ministry, death, and resurrection of Jesus based on the accounts in the four New Testament Gospels debuts on British television. The series stars Robert Powell as Jesus.
- 1978 in British television – Anna Ford becomes the first female news reader on ITN and the first of ITV's An Audience with is aired, presented by Jasper Carrott.
- 1979 in British television – Technicians at Thames Television go on strike – the dispute quickly spreads to other regions in the ITV network and ITV is off air for eleven weeks from 10 August to 24 October, Ceefax begins subtitles for some programmes, Robin Day presents the first edition of Question Time and Terry Wogan presents the first edition of Blankety Blank.

== 1980s ==
- 1980 in British television – Launch of Newsnight, the first televising of Watchdog, Family Fortunes and Play Your Cards Right both debut on ITV and the first BBC Children in Need telethon.
- 1981 in British television – Viewers watch the Wedding of Charles, Prince of Wales and Lady Diana Spencer, Only Fools and Horses and Postman Pat both debut on BBC One. Danger Mouse debuts on ITV. ATV, Southern, and Westward go off air after losing their broadcasting franchises – they are replaced on 1 January 1982 by Central, TVS and TSW respectively.
- 1982 in British television – Channel 4, Britain's fourth terrestrial channel, goes on air, along with the first airing of its first and long running teatime game show Countdown and first animated Christmas special The Snowman; S4C, a Welsh-language version is also launched. "The Satellite Channel", the channel which later became Sky One, also goes on air.
- 1983 in British television – BBC One and ITV launch their respective breakfast television services. Children's ITV is also launched. 1983 also sees Bob Holness presenting the first edition of Blockbusters on ITV.
- 1984 in British television – Thames Television goes off the air for one day when technical staff walk out on strike, BBC One airs the first edition of Crimewatch and Thomas the Tank Engine and Friends debuts on ITV 12 years before moving to satellite channels Cartoon Network and Nick Jr.
- 1985 in British television – EastEnders debuts along with Howards' Way, Bertha and Telly Addicts on BBC One, The 17-hour Live Aid concert takes place in both London and Philadelphia, The last 405-line transmitters are switched off in the UK and Children's BBC is also launched.
- 1986 in British television – BBC One begins a full daytime schedule service for the first time with Australian soap Neighbours making its UK debut as part of the schedule, while Yorkshire becomes the first ITV region to begin broadcasting 24 hours a day. 1986 also sees Neighbours make its British television debut along with Pingu, Casualty and Catchphrase.
- 1987 in British television – Going for Gold and Fireman Sam debut on BBC One while The Cook Report and Knightmare (TV series)launches on ITV; The TV-am strike begins after members of the technician's union the ACTT walk out in a dispute over the station's 'Caring Christmas Campaign.' What is meant to be a 24-hour stoppage continues for several months when staff are locked out by Managing Director Bruce Gyngell. TV-am is unable to broadcast Good Morning Britain. It is replaced with a skeleton service that sees non-technical staff operating cameras and Gyngell himself directing proceedings, as well as imported shows such as Flipper, Batman and Happy Days being used to fill up the station's airtime. Viewing figures remain high throughout the disruption, which continues well into 1988, although normal programming gradually resumes. The strikers are eventually sacked and replaced with non union staff. ITV stations later follow Gyngell's example. The ITV Schools service move to Channel 4 to allow ITV to develop a fully commercial daytime schedule and The Old Grey Whistle Test and The Two Ronnies end as does the original run of University Challenge. Two separate government studies identify spare frequency space on the UHF band, prompting political debate about the viability of a fifth UK terrestrial TV channel.
- 1988 in British television – By the end of 1988, all ITV regions are providing a full 24-hour service, which includes through-the-night news summaries and bulletins from ITN. Also in 1988, the BBC and Channel 4 both start broadcasting into the early hours for the first time. Comic Relief airs its first Red Nose Day fundraiser on BBC One three years after it was founded while ITV broadcasts Death on the Rock, a hugely controversial episode of Thames Television's This Week current affairs strand, investigating Operation Flavius, which resulted in the SAS killing three members of the IRA in Gibraltar. The British government introduces 6 years of regulations banning the direct broadcast of people representing eleven Irish republican and Ulster loyalist groups. You Bet! appears along with This Morning and 15 to 1. 1988 also sees the end of the long-running soap Crossroads along with Play School which is replaced by Playbus. The popularity of Neighbours sees it moved to an early evening slot on BBC One.
- 1989 in British television – Sky Television plc is launched while the government introduces a controversial Broadcasting Bill that will pave the way for the deregulation of commercial television. Television cameras are allowed into the House of Commons for the first time. Also A Grand Day Out starring Wallace and Gromit debuts first on Channel 4 before moving to the BBC and Red Dwarf debuts on BBC2 and Australian soap Home and Away debuts on ITV.

== 1990s ==
- 1990 in British television – British Satellite Broadcasting (BSB) is launched, but later merges with Sky Television plc after an unsuccessful run. John Major the Chancellor of the Exchequer and eventual Prime Minister of the UK, delivers the first budget statement to be televised. The Broadcasting Bill receives Royal Assent, pop music game show Stars in Their Eyes first appears on ITV along with You've Been Framed! and Mr. Bean, popular BBC sitcom One Foot in the Grave also appears and The Simpsons debut on Sky.
- 1991 in British television – Regular programming is abandoned in order to bring live coverage of the Gulf War after Allied Forces launch Operation Desert Storm against Iraq. Over the duration of the war there is extended coverage of events in the Persian Gulf. ITV also broadcasts news and discussion programmes about the war throughout the night. Some broadcasting, particularly in the earlier part of the war, comes from CNN. Also this year the ITV franchise auction results are announced and take effect starting midnight GMT on 1 January 1993.
- 1992 in British television – The controversial one-off drama Ghostwatch is broadcast on BBC One, a 'live' investigation into a haunted North London house. UK Gold is launched, a joint venture between the BBC and Thames Television. The ITC invites bids to run a fifth UK television channel but rejects the sole application amid concerns about its business plan and investor commitment to the project. The hugely popular BBC sitcom Absolutely Fabulous makes its debut, as does the popular Channel 4 morning show The Big Breakfast. 1992 also sees University Challenge, Thunderbirds, Stingray and Captain Scarlet and the Mysterons all move from ITV to the BBC. Live coverage of top flight English football transferred from ITV to Sky Sports meaning that viewers had to pay a subscription fee to watch the newly formed Premier League.
- 1993 in British television – Carlton Television takes over the ITV London Weekday franchise, replacing Thames Television after 24 years. Additionally, Meridian Broadcasting takes over the South of England franchise from TVS, Westcountry Television takes over the South West England franchise from TSW, and GMTV takes over the breakfast television franchise from TV-am. 1993 also sees Teletext Ltd take over the ITV and Channel 4 teletext franchises from ORACLE.
- 1994 in British television – The 1988–1994 broadcasting ban is lifted when the Provisional IRA declares a ceasefire. Following an earlier attempt to award the broadcasting licence for a fifth UK terrestrial television channel, the ITC readvertises for bids. After an absence of 7 years University Challenge returns along with Play Your Cards Right, BBC One airs the first National Lottery draw and BBC Two celebrates its 30th birthday. 1994 also sees Wipeout appear along with Pets Win Prizes and Small Talk.
- 1995 in British television – This year sees the launch of several new satellite TV channels, as well as the first National Television Awards, while Channel 5 Broadcasting Ltd is awarded the licence to run Channel 5. Father Ted also debuts on Channel 4. 1995 also sees the beginning of the sport game show They Think It's All Over.
- 1996 in British television – Launch of Granada Sky Broadcasting and an unsuccessful rebranding of the ITV Tyne Tees region. The acclaimed dramas Our Friends in the North and This Life are broadcast on BBC2. 1996 also sees the beginning of a new Friday entertainment show towards the new millennium TFI Friday on Channel 4 while Pauline Quirke stars in the psychological crime thriller The Sculptress.
- 1997 in British television – Launch of Channel 5, Britain's fifth terrestrial channel followed by the first appearance of the Teletubbies on BBC One & BBC Two, The UKTV network and BBC News 24 are also launched. Programming schedules are abandoned to provide up to date news coverage following the death of Diana, Princess of Wales. 1997 also sees the futuristic game show Robot Wars filmed in the latter half of this year and then appears on BBC Two in the early half of the following year.
- 1998 in British television – Digital satellite television is launched in the UK, spearheaded by Sky. The UK's first two digital only stations, BBC Choice and ITV2 are both launched. ITV launches Who Wants to Be a Millionaire?, Sky Sports News is also launched and Come Dancing the last of the ongoing 1940s debuts leaves the BBC after nearly 50 years. 1998 also sees Don't Try This at Home take over from You Bet! at Shepperton Studios.
- 1999 in British television – Popular television presenter Jill Dando is assassinated outside her home in West London, The murder remains unsolved to the present day, Six TV, Britain's sixth and last terrestrial localised channel launches in both Oxfordshire and Southampton, ITV axes News at Ten after a run of 32 years & The Cook Report after 12 years & 16 Series and BBC One broadcasts a marathon 28-hour programme to welcome in the new millennium. 1999 also sees the debut of Tweenies on BBC One & BBC Two.

== 2000s ==
- 2000 in British television – Judith Keppel becomes the first contestant to win the £1 million prize on Who Wants to Be a Millionaire. The UK versions of The Weakest Link and Big Brother also debut this year. Coronation Street celebrates 40 years on air with a live episode and the ITV News Channel launches. Channel 5 outbids ITV for the broadcasting rights to Home and Away.
- 2001 in British television – British viewers witnesses the September 11 terrorist attacks on New York City and Washington. Some regular programming is suspended in order to bring up to date coverage of events relating to the attacks. Charles Ingram cheats to win the £1 million prize on Who Wants to Be a Millionaire. ITV's News at Ten returns after being axed two years previously, the ITV Sport Channel launches along with E4 and ITV rebrands its English and Welsh services to ITV1. 2001 also sees TV soap Crossroads return after 13 years of absence, Home and Away moves to Channel 5, while Channel 4 announces it will stop showing Sesame Street at the 6am slot to be replaced by The Hoobs in July, and The Office debuts on BBC Two.
- 2002 in British television – Will Young is voted winner of the first series of Pop Idol, Harry Hill's TV Burp begins on ITV1 with ITV2 showing repeats afterwards, along with I'm a Celebrity... Get Me Out of Here and Ant and Dec's Saturday Night Takeaway, CBeebies launches to separate from CBBC, ITV Digital is replaced by Freeview, the ITV Sport Channel is defunct, All major television networks cover the Death and funeral of Queen Elizabeth, The Queen Mother, which occurs on 30 March and Channel 5 is rebranded as Five. 2002 also sees Raven, The Story of Tracy Beaker, The Basil Brush Show and Dick and Dom in Da Bungalow begin on CBBC along with BrainTeaser appearing on Channel 5.
- 2003 in British television – Panorama becomes the first ongoing British television programme to reach its 50th anniversary since BBC Wimbledon in 1977, The Boat Race in 1988 and BBC Cricket in 1989 and ITV screens the controversial Martin Bashir documentary Living with Michael Jackson.
- 2004 in British television – Supernanny launches a year before the London Bombings, Strictly Come Dancing sequels to take over from Come Dancing, Greg Dyke resigns as Director-General of the BBC in the wake of the Hutton Report and News at Ten axes from ITV for a second time. Peppa Pig also debuts on Channel 5, along with Something Special on CBeebies and the long-running ITV singing talent show The X Factor. 2004 also sees Tiny Pop launched in the UK to replace Pop Plus.
- 2005 in British television – After an absence of 16 years Doctor Who returns to British television starting with Christopher Eccleston in the leading role, The quiz show Deal or No Deal is launched along with the Coach Trip and The Biggest Loser, The Two Ronnies Sketchbook sequels to take over from The Two Ronnies, More4 is launched and the ITV News Channel is defunct. 2005 also sees the debut of The Apprentice on BBC One.
- 2006 in British television – ITV Play and the CITV Channel both launch, Michael Grade is appointed as chief executive of ITV, Richard Hammond is seriously injured while driving a jet-powered car for a piece for Top Gear, Top of the Pops axe weekly episodes before revival by Christmas and Stars in Their Eyes is also axed along with They Think It's All Over and the traditional Saturday morning children's live programmes due to viewer shortages. 2006 also sees The Slammer begin on CBBC as well as Dancing on Ice on ITV.
- 2007 in British television – A series of scandals involving allegations of phone-in segments of television programmes and quiz channels conning viewers, The BBC launches BBC iPlayer, The town of Whitehaven in Cumbria becomes the first place in the UK to lose their analogue television signals and start the digital switchover and ITV Play is defunct and rebranded as ITV Bingo. 2007 also sees the debuts of Golden Balls, Benidorm and Britain's Got Talent on ITV1 along with the CBBC Halloween-themed game show Trapped!, Shaun the Sheep and the Prank Patrol on CBBC, In the Night Garden... on CBeebies and Gavin & Stacey and Outnumbered on BBC One.
- 2008 in British television – Weekly comparison between overweight and underweight people programme Supersize vs Superskinny appears, Freesat officially launches while ITV HD launches a full service and ITV's News at Ten returns for its third run after being axed again four years previously. The Inbetweeners also debuts on E4 along with the Big Brother zombie miniseries Dead Set. Neighbours moves from BBC One to Channel 5 after Channel 5 secures the broadcasting rights to the Australian soap.
- 2009 in British television – This year sees many changes at ITV as the company encounters financial troubles and The Coach Trip returns after 3 years of absence along with The Biggest Loser. 2009 also sees Six TV in Oxfordshire and Southampton defunct after only 10 years of localized airing and Horrible Histories begins on CBBC, Timmy Time begins on CBeebies and Divided, The Chase and The Cube all begin on ITV1 as well.

== 2010s ==
- 2010 in British television – A series of US-style head-to-head party leaders' debates are broadcast across UK television ahead of the 2010 general election, the first such debates to be held in the run up to a UK election. ITV's breakfast television service GMTV is axed after seventeen years on air, and replaced by Daybreak. Coronation Street celebrates its 50th year on air with a live episode, while EastEnders marks its 25th anniversary. The ITV period drama Downton Abbey makes its television debut.
- 2011 in British television – Viewers watch the Wedding of Prince William and Catherine Middleton, and the first broadcast of Mrs. Brown's Boys on BBC One, Channel 5 reverts to its original name after almost a decade. Little Mix become the first group to win The X Factor. BBC Four begins rerunning old editions of Top of the Pops on Thursday evenings, starting from April 1976.
- 2012 in British television – Spring of this year sees The Weakest Link come to an end with the 1,693rd edition, when Anne Robinson retires from the show to concentrate on Brand newer series of Watchdog, CBeebies celebrates 10 years of being separated from CBBC, Spring 2012 also sees Harry Hill's TV Burp ending on ITV with a huge finale after 10 or 11 years of broadcast, as well as the Teletubbies celebrating their 15th actual anniversary on the BBC. The events of the Olympic Games begin airing with the opening ceremony in London as well as the debut of Tipping Point from July of this year. The Digital Switchover is completed in October as the final analogue transmitters are switched off in Northern Ireland. In Scotland, the sentencing phase of the trial of David Gilroy is the first in the United Kingdom to be filmed for broadcast.
- 2013 in British television – BBC Two launches in high-definition for the first time 2 1/2 years after BBC One did, Panorama becomes the first ongoing British TV programme to reach and celebrate its 60th anniversary since BBC Wimbledon in 1987 The Boat Race in 1998 and BBC Cricket in 1999, More4 also launches in HD for the first time, CITV will celebrate its 30th anniversary by airing an Old Skool weekend and Doctor Who celebrates its 50th anniversary by airing a special episode all across both Britain and the globe. Spring 2013 also sees the BBC Television centre's old building close with all the BBC services in London moving to the new one next door known as the Broadcasting House along with the debut of Gogglebox and Peaky Blinders on Channel 4 and BBC Two.
- 2014 in British television – 50th anniversary of the first edition of Top of the Pops. Although an edition was aired on New Year's Eve 2013, the anniversary itself goes unmarked by the BBC because of the programme's association with the late Jimmy Savile. The first episode of Channel 4's controversial documentary series Benefits Street attracts several hundred viewer complaints. BBC Two celebrates its 50th anniversary along with Match of the Day. ITV axes its breakfast television programme Daybreak after nearly four years on air, replacing it with Good Morning Britain.
- 2015 in British television – 10th anniversary of the 2005 relaunch of Doctor Who, The rebooted series of Teletubbies will feature voiceovers from names including Jane Horrocks, Jim Broadbent and Fearne Cotton, it is revealed, EastEnders concludes the Who Killed Lucy Beale? storyline by revealing her younger brother Bobby Beale as her killer live in a special flashback episode to celebrate the show's 30th anniversary, Thunderbirds celebrates its 50th anniversary with the debut of the CGI animated reboot Thunderbirds Are Go, Brian Blessed and Dave Lamb. The CBBC channel will also air a 60-minute programme celebrating thirty years of The Broom Cupboard, the studio from which CBBC continuity presenters Andi Peters, Phillip Schofield, Zoë Ball and Edd the Duck, Louisa Johnson becomes the youngest ever contestant to win The X Factor and launch of YourTV on Freeview and YouView, Fox UK's first free-to-air channel and which is targeted at women. The vintage-film and nostalgia television channel Talking Pictures TV is launched.
- 2016 in British television – The BBC announces a deal with Discovery Communications that enables it to broadcast coverage of the Summer and Winter Olympics up to and including the 2024 Summer Olympic Games, The agreement covers television, radio and online coverage, Channel 5, 5* and 5USA get a new look on 11 February as their stencil logos for their channels get their very first airing. 5* is also rebranded as 5Star on the same day, BBC Three closes after thirteen years on air to become an online only channel, Casualty celebrates its 30th anniversary with a special feature-length episode. 2016 also sees the debut of a new 3pm slot game show Tenable on ITV after the axing of two other 3pm slot game shows 1000 Heartbeats and Rebound.
- 2017 in British television – The Saturday evening National Lottery Draw stops being shown on BBC One and is now only seen on the BBC iPlayer, the Corporation having taken the decision to stop broadcasting the draw live on BBC One after agreeing a news, Impossible debuts on the same channel, Channel 5, the Teletubbies and Robot Wars all celebrate their 20th anniversaries, In the Night Garden..., Shaun the Sheep and Golden Balls all celebrate their 10th anniversaries. ITV launches its pay-per-view service ITV Box Office, Wimbledon Tennis celebrates 90 years of coverage on the BBC during Wimbledon Tennis' 140th anniversary and Channel 4, S4C and Countdown all celebrate their 35th anniversaries.
- 2018 in British television – BBC One airs the first of two editions of the latest version of The Generation Game, which is presented by Mel and Sue along with airing The Queen's Birthday Party, a concert from London's Royal Albert Hall celebrating the 92nd birthday of Queen Elizabeth II. Spring 2018 also sees The National Lottery results being broadcast on ITV for the first time after more than two decades on the BBC, with the results appearing as a 90-second summary as part of an advert break. September 2018 sees The Circle debut on Channel 4. Series 11 of Doctor Who sees Jodie Whittaker star as the Thirteenth Doctor; she becomes the first woman to play the role of The Doctor.
- 2019 in British television – The Doctor Who seasonal special is moved from Christmas Day to New Year's Day. BBC Two Scotland closes and is replaced by a new BBC Scotland channel. The Jeremy Kyle Show is axed by ITV due to the death of a guest. The BBC One current affairs programme This Week is shown for the last time after sixteen years on air, and replaced by Brexitcast. Channel 4 opens its new national headquarters in Leeds.

== 2020s ==
- 2020 in British television – Many popular TV shows, such as Through the Keyhole and Take Me Out are axed. The production of many TV shows is halted due to the COVID-19 pandemic. ITV announces that the 2020 series of I'm a Celebrity...Get Me Out of Here! will be staged at Gwrych Castle in North Wales due to travel restrictions imposed because of COVID. After the UK government axes funding for free television licences for over-75s the BBC are forced to start charging for them again from 1 August. Channel 4's Alternative Christmas Message causes controversy after it is delivered by a deepfake version of The Queen and airs at the same time as the real Christmas Message. Brexitcast ends on TV two days prior to it ending on the radio. The Crown Court (Recording and Broadcasting) Order 2020 paves the way for television cameras to be allowed to film the sentencing phase of criminal trials in England and Wales.
- 2021 in British television – All major television networks cover the Death and funeral of Prince Philip, Duke of Edinburgh, which occurs on 9 April, with the BBC receiving a record number of complaints (109,741) after it clears its schedule to provide rolling news coverage. GB News launches in June, with Nigel Farage joining as one of its presenters. The recording and release of many TV programmes are delayed due to the COVID-19 pandemic. I'm a Celebrity...Get Me Out of Here! takes place in Wales for a second year, but is forced off air for a number of days without a clear winner until 12 December following damage caused by Storm Arwen; Talking Pictures TV launches the TPTV Encore catch-up service. 2021 also sees two new game shows on BBC Two called Lightning and Unbeatable after the axing of BBC One's Impossible.
- 2022 in British television – The recording and release of some TV programmes are expected to be delayed due to the COVID-19 pandemic. BBC Three is relaunched as a television channel, six years after becoming an online service. News UK launches the talkTV news channel. GB News begins a daily broadcast of the national anthem, 25 years after it was last aired daily by BBC television. BBC One hospital drama Holby City comes to an end after 23 years, while Channel 5 announces it will stop showing Neighbours, with the soap's final episode airing in July; Amazon Studios then picks up the series, announcing it will return in 2023. The Platinum Jubilee of Elizabeth II is celebrated on television, including BBC One soap EastEnders, where the Prince of Wales and Duchess of Cornwall make a cameo appearance. On 8 September, the death of Queen Elizabeth II is announced. All major television networks provide coverage of events following her death, while her funeral is broadcast by over 50 UK television channels and watched by a cumulative audience of 28 million. The proclamation of accession of Charles III also becomes the first such ceremony to be televised. The Old Bailey trials of Ben Oliver and Jemma Mitchell become the first criminal cases in England and Wales to have their sentencing phase broadcast on television after the Shoreditch Crown Court (Recording and Broadcasting) Order 2020 is enacted.
- 2023 in British television – The BBC merges its UK and international news channels into a single global, but with opt-outs for UK viewers. The government confirms Channel 4 has been saved from privatisation. The Coronation of Charles III is celebrated on television. GB News suspends presenters Laurence Fox and Dan Wootton over "totally unacceptable" misogynistic comments about a female journalist made on an edition of Dan Wootton Tonight; Ofcom also launches an investigation after receiving 7,300 complaints about the incident. Panorama becomes the first ongoing British television programme to reach its 70th anniversary since BBC Wimbledon in 1997, The Boat Race in 2008 and BBC Cricket in 2009, Phillip Schofield quits ITV's This Morning following a controversy; Holly Willoughby also leaves the programme later in the year.
- 2024 in British television – Former Chancellor of the Exchequer Nadhim Zahawi makes a guest appearance in the ITV drama Mr Bates vs The Post Office as himself, questioning Post Office chief executive Paula Vennells in a 2015 House of Commons committee inquiry into the Horizon computer system. Gladiators returns for a third run on British television, this time on BBC One. Ben Shephard and Cat Deeley become the new regular presenters of This Morning. Piers Morgan moves his Piers Morgan Uncensored show from TalkTV to YouTube; Talk subsequently switches from being a television to an online streaming service. BBC One's daytime soap Doctors will end alongside Classic Doctors after nearly 5,000 episodes and nearly 25 years on air.
- 2025 in British television – The Simpsons after over 20 years on Channel 4 moves to E4, Gary Lineker is announced to present his last regular edition of Match of the Day, he will continue to host FA Cup & the 2026 FIFA World Cup for the BBC in the 2025–26 season before leaving the BBC, Eurosport will close in the UK and Ireland after 36 years when TNT Sports incorporates the coverage previously shown on Eurosport. This includes the Olympic Games, cycling (including the Tour de France), snooker, tennis (including three of the four majors) and winter sports and All WWE wrestling programmes move to Netflix after many years on their linear TV channels including TNT Sports, with the WWE Network closing down coincidentally.
- 2026 in British television – ITV1 airs Corriedale, a crossover episode featuring characters from Coronation Street and Emmerdale and ITV confirms that filming for Love Island: All Stars has been postponed for a number of days until 15 January after the villa used for the series is evacuated due to wildfires. The Number of episodes of Love Island: All Stars may therefore decrease to 33, 34 or 35. The British Soap Awards suffers its fourth non-successive cancellation and the food & drinks counterpart of What Not to Wear called "What Not to Eat" makes its debut on Channel 4.
- 2027 in British television –

== Timelines of television by history ==
=== Television channels ===
- Timeline of the BBC
  - Timeline of the BBC Television Service
  - Timeline of BBC One
  - Timeline of BBC Two
  - Timeline of non-flagship BBC television channels
- Timeline of ITV
  - Timeline of ABC Weekend TV
  - Timeline of Anglia Television
  - Timeline of ATV
  - Timeline of Border Television
  - Timeline of Carlton Television
  - Timeline of Central Independent Television
  - Timeline of Channel Television
  - Timeline of Grampian Television
  - Timeline of Granada Television
  - Timeline of HTV West
  - Timeline of London Weekend Television
  - Timeline of Meridian Broadcasting
  - Timeline of Scottish Television
  - Timeline of Southern Television
  - Timeline of Thames Television and Associated-Rediffusion
  - Timeline of TSW and Westward
  - Timeline of TV-am
  - Timeline of GMTV & GMTV2
  - Timeline of TVS
  - Timeline of Tyne Tees Television
  - Timeline of Ulster Television
  - Timeline of Westcountry Television
  - Timeline of Yorkshire Television
- Timeline of Channel 4
- Timeline of Channel 5
- Timeline of Sky Limited
- Timeline of UKTV

=== Children's programming on British Television Channel Networks ===
- Timeline of children's television on the BBC
- Timeline of children's television on ITV
- Timeline of children's television on other British TV channels

=== Sports coverage on British Television Channel Networks ===
- Timeline of BBC Sport
- Timeline of ITV Sport
- Timeline of sport on Channel 4
- Timeline of sport on Channel 5

=== Nations ===
- Timeline of ITV in Wales
- Timeline of television in Northern Ireland
- Timeline of television in Scotland
- Timeline of television in Wales

=== Cities ===
- Timeline of television in London

== See also ==
- List of years in television
