= When Were We Funniest? =

- Genre: Documentary
- Presented by: Alexander Armstrong
- Starring: Martin Freeman; Meera Syal; Jo Brand; Phill Jupitus; Frankie Boyle
- Narrated by: Alexander Armstrong
- Country of origin: United Kingdom
- No. of series: 1
- No. of episodes: 12

Original release
- Network: Gold
- Release: 28 February – 18 December 2008

When Were We Funniest? is a Gold documentary series broadcast in 2008.

== Format ==
Gold wanted to ask the public which decade of British television they thought was the funniest, the 1960s, 1970s, 1980s, 1990s or 2000s. Before the public voted Gold chose five celebrities who each represented one of the decades of television comedy and all of them attempted to convince the viewing public that their decade was the funniest. The first episode was the celebrities on a panel briefly explaining why they thought the public should vote for their decade.

After that each celebrity presented two episodes. In the first one they were able to explain to the public in more detail why they though their decade was the funniest, they would also show clips from comedy programmes in their decade and the celebrity would choose five clips which they believed were the best. Out of all the clips shown, the public were then asked to vote for the five clips they found funniest. In the second episode the clips were put into order based on the public's votes, they were shown from the clip which received the fewest votes to the one with the most votes. The narrator (Alexander Armstrong) would also show where the public placed the celebrity's top five clips. The public were then asked to vote for the funniest decade and funniest clip. In the final overall episode the top five clips were revealed as well as where each decade was placed. As each decade was announced the celebrities gave comments on the placement of each one.

== Advocates and result ==
The presenter and narrator of the programme was Alexander Armstrong.

Decade	Place	Advocate	Source
1960s	5th	Martin Freeman	
1970s	1st	Meera Syal	
1980s	2nd	Jo Brand	
1990s	3rd	Phill Jupitus	
2000s	4th	Frankie Boyle	

== Episodes ==
The launch episode aired on 28 February 2008, after that each advocate presented their two shows and the series final aired on 18 December 2008.

No.	Title	Presenter	Original release date
1	"The Launch"	28 February 2008	Alexander Armstrong
Alexander Armstrong introduces the show and the advocates representing a decade of television comedy. The advocates were given 60 seconds to briefly explain why and attempt to persuade the viewers their decade was the funniest.
2	"1990s Clips Show"	6 March 2008	Phill Jupitus
3	"1990s Results Show"	3 April 2008	Phill Jupitus
4	"1980s Clips Show"	24 April 2008	Jo Brand
5	"1980s Results Show"	22 May 2008	Jo Brand
6	"1970s Clips Show"	12 June 2008	Meera Syal
7	"1970s Results Show"	10 July 2008	Meera Syal
8	"1960s Clips Show"	31 July 2008	Martin Freeman
9	"1960s Results Show"	28 August 2008	Martin Freeman
10	"2000s Clips Show"	18 September 2008	Frankie Boyle
11	"2000s Results Show"	23 October 2008	Frankie Boyle
12	"The Final"	18 December 2008	Alexander Armstrong
