= 1928 in British music =

This is a summary of 1928 in music in the United Kingdom.

== Events ==
January – Edward German is knighted for services to music.

- April – While studying under Frank Bridge, 15-year-old Benjamin Britten composes his String Quartet in F.
- June – Herbert Sumsion leaves the United States for the UK to take up the post of organist at Gloucester Cathedral.
- 9 August – Percy Grainger marries Swedish artist Ella Ström at the Hollywood Bowl.
- September – Benjamin Britten goes as a boarder to Gresham's School, in Holt, Norfolk.
- 10 October – Eric Fenby arrives in Grez to begin work as amanuensis for Frederick Delius.
- date unknown
  - Malcolm Sargent becomes conductor of the Royal Choral Society.
  - Arnold Bax begins taking an annual working holiday in Morar, in the west Scottish Highlands.

== Popular music ==
- Noël Coward – "World Weary"

== Classical music: new works ==
- Kenneth J. Alford – Dunedin (march)
- Granville Bantock – Pagan Symphony
- Arthur Bliss – Pastoral 'Lie strewn the white flocks'
- Hamilton Harty – Suite for Cello and Piano
- Gustav Holst – A Moorside Suite
- John Ireland – Two Songs, 1928
- Cyril Rootham – "On the Morning of Christ's Nativity"
- Ralph Vaughan Williams – Te Deum in G major
- William Walton – Sinfonia Concertante

== Opera ==
- Stanley Bate – The Forest Enchanted
- William Henry Bell – The Mouse Trap; libretto after The Sire de Maletroit's Door by Robert Louis Stevenson

== Musical theatre ==
- The Good Old Days of England, music by Percy Fletcher, libretto by Oscar Asche

== Births ==
- 17 January – Matt McGinn, folk singer (died 1977)
- 8 February – Osian Ellis, harpist
- 5 March – Diana Coupland, singer and actress (died 2006)
- 6 March – Ronald Stevenson, composer and pianist (died 2015)
- 13 March – Ronnie Hazlehurst, conductor and composer (died 2007)
- 2 April – April Cantelo, soprano (died 2024)
- 4 April
  - Jimmy Logan, entertainer (died 2001)
  - Monty Norman, singer and composer of the James Bond signature tune
- 19 April – Alexis Korner, blues musician and historian (died 1984)
- 27 May – Thea Musgrave, composer
- 6 July – Peter Glossop, operatic baritone (died 2008)
- 16 July – Bryden Thomson, orchestral conductor (died 1991)
- 20 July – Peter Ind, jazz double-bassist and record producer
- 26 August – Andrew Porter, music critic (died 2015)
- 6 October – Flora MacNeil, singer in Scottish Gaelic (died 2015)
- 20 December – Donald Adams, operatic bass-baritone (died 1996)

== Deaths ==
- 1 March – Sir Herbert Brewer, organist and composer (born 1865)
- 27 March – Leslie Stuart, musical theatre composer (born 1863)
- 13 May – David Thomas, composer (born 1881)
- 21 June – Marie Novello, pianist (born 1898)
- 12 September – Howard Talbot, conductor and composer (born 1865)
- 30 October – Percy Anderson, D'Oyly Carte stage designer (born 1851)
- 26 November – Herbert Sullivan, nephew and biographer of Sir Arthur Sullivan (born 1868)

== See also ==
- 1928 in British television
- 1928 in the United Kingdom
- List of British films of 1928
