= Timeline of ABC Weekend TV =

This is a timeline of the history of the British television company ABC Weekend TV, one of the first four contractors of the Independent Television network.

== 1950s ==
- 1954
  - 26 October – The Independent Television Authority (ITA) awards franchises for weekend services in the Midlands and North of England regions to Kemsley-Winnick Television.
- 1955
  - 21 September – After the collapse of Kemsley-Winnick, the ITA approaches Associated British Picture Corporation (ABPC) to provide the services instead and the contract was signed that day.
  - 8 October – After legal action from ABPC, the weekend service for London is renamed from ABC (Associated Broadcasting Company) to ATV (Associated TeleVision), thus allowing ABPC to later use the ABC name for its own TV service.
- 1956
  - 17 February – Alpha Television, a joint venture between ABC and the Midlands weekday contractor ATV, reopens the former Astoria Cinema in Aston, Birmingham, as a studio shared between the companies.
  - 18 February – ABPC's new company, Associated British Cinemas (Television) Ltd, begins its Midlands weekend service, under the brand name "ABC", broadcasting from Lichfield transmitting station. Its logo is based on the logo of ABC Cinemas (owned by ABPC).
  - 5 May – ABC begins its North of England weekend service. Initially the service covers the North West from Winter Hill transmitting station. The former Capitol Cinema in Didsbury, Manchester, reopens as ABC's studios in the North of England.
  - 3 November – ABC's North of England service is extended to Yorkshire via Emley Moor transmitting station.
- 1957
  - No events.
- 1958
  - November – ABC buys the former Warner film studios at Teddington Lock in London, to be converted into television studios.
- 1959
  - Teddington Studios open as ABC's main production centre in London.
  - September – ABC introduces a new logo based on inverted triangles, accompanied by a jingle based on the musical notes A, B and C.

== 1960s ==
- 1960
  - No events.
- 1961
  - 7 January – The first episode of ABC's cult series The Avengers is broadcast. It would run until 1969.
  - 18 July – A new 1,000-foot (300 m) mast at Lichfield replaces the existing 450-foot (140 m) mast to extend ABC's Midlands service.
  - August – Alpha Television in Birmingham upgrades its site to provide a second studio, office block, canteen and other facilities.
- 1962
  - No events.
- 1963
  - No events.
- 1964
  - 11 July – ABC airs the first episode of its version of the talent show Opportunity Knocks. A previous version had been made for one series in 1956 by Associated-Rediffusion. ABC and its successor Thames Television continue to produce the show until 1978. It would later be revived by the BBC in 1987 and its version would run until 1990.
- 1965
  - 2 January – World of Sport is first broadcast. ABC compiles and hosts the show from contributions from the whole ITV network. After ABC's demise, the show would be hosted by London Weekend Television (branded as ITV Sport) until 1985.
  - 30 April – Membury transmitting station extends ABC's Midlands service to the Thames Valley area.
  - 11 June – A new relay station in Scarborough extends ABC's North of England service.
- 1966
  - 28 February – A new 1,015-foot (309 m) mast at Winter Hill replaces the existing 450-foot (140 m) mast to extend ABC's service in the North West.
  - 15 August – A new 1,265-foot (386 m) mast at Emley Moor replaces the existing 450-foot (140 m) mast to extend ABC's service in Yorkshire.
- 1967
  - 13 January – The fifth series of The Avengers begins in the UK. This is the first series shot on colour film, even though ITV would not broadcast in colour until nearly three years later, the colour is for the benefit of American audiences. ABC uses the name "Associated British Corporation" at the end of the episodes in this series to avoid confusion with the American ABC network.
  - 11 June – At its franchise review, the ITA decides that ABC will lose both its licences in 1968. Subsequently, the owners of ABC and the London weekday contractor Rediffusion will jointly form a new company Thames Television which will be awarded the new London weekday franchise.
- 1968
  - 28 July – ABC broadcasts for the last time. Its Midlands service is to be replaced by ATV and its North of England service is to be replaced by Granada Television in the North West and Yorkshire Television in Yorkshire.
  - 30 July – Thames Television goes on the air. The ABC brand continues to be used on some programmes broadcast by Thames (including the final series of The Avengers). Thames also inherits ABC's Teddington Studios.

== See also ==
- Timeline of ITV
- Timeline of Thames Television – ABC's production successor
- Timeline of Granada Television – ABC's broadcast successor in the North West
- Timeline of Yorkshire Television – ABC's broadcast successor in Yorkshire
- Timeline of ATV – ABC's broadcast successor in the Midlands
