= Timeline of Thames Television =

This is a timeline of the history of the British broadcaster Thames Television and its predecessor Associated-Rediffusion. Between them, they provided the ITV weekday service for London from 1955 to 1992, after which Thames continued as an independent production company until 2003.

== Associated-Rediffusion ==
- 1955
  - 22 September – At 7:15pm, ITV goes on the air for the first time when Associated-Rediffusion starts broadcasting on weekdays to the London area.
  - 23 September – Associated-Rediffusion, and therefore ITV's first full day of transmission, includes the inaugural edition of Morning Magazine. At 12pm, ITV's first breakdown occurs when the ITN news bulletin was scheduled to air.
- 1956
  - 6 January – The first edition of current affairs programme This Week is broadcast.
- 1957 to 1963
  - No events.
- 1964
  - 6 April – The name Associated-Rediffusion is dropped in favour of Rediffusion London, to reflect the cultural changes of the time, and output altered accordingly.
  - Associated-Rediffusion is given a three-year extension to its licence. This is later extended by a further year.
- 1965
  - No events.
- 1966
  - No events.
- 1967
  - October – The Independent Television Authority announces that there was no place for Rediffusion in the redrawn franchise pattern. Also, ABC Weekend TV loses all its franchises along with the rights to take over the Midlands, held by ATV, or the London Weekend franchise, awarded to the London Television Consortium. ABPC, the parent company of ABC and BET, the parent company of Rediffusion, created Thames as a separate entity. Rediffusion's parent company, BET, takes a 49% stake in Thames, and was under-represented in the management of the new company – a state of affairs to which Rediffusion strongly objected. The ITA replied that either Thames or ABC take over. Rediffusion chose Thames.
- 1968
  - 29 July – Rediffusion London's last night on the air.

== Thames ==
=== 1960s ===
- 1968
  - 30 July – Thames Television starts broadcasting and its first week on the air is disrupted by sporadic strike action.
  - 2 August – A technicians strike forces ITV off the air for several weeks although management manage to launch a temporary ITV Emergency National Service with no regional variations.
- 1969
  - 17 November – Thames begins broadcasting in colour.
  - 19 November – Thames revives This Is Your Life, five years after it disappeared from the BBC.

=== 1970s ===
- 1970
  - Following the launch of colour broadcasts, Thames’ famous ident is given a makeover and the drawings are replaced by photographs. It was to be used for the next 19 years.
  - Thames sells off Television House, Rediffusion's former London headquarters, and moves to its newly constructed studios and offices to new premises on Euston Road.
- 1971
  - No events.
- 1972
  - 16 October – Following a law change which removed all restrictions on broadcasting hours, ITV is able to launch an afternoon service.
- 1973
  - 31 October – The first of 26 episodes of The World at War is broadcast. It took four years to produce.
- 1974
  - The 1974 franchise round sees no changes in ITV's contractors as it is felt that the huge cost in switching to colour television would have made the companies unable to compete against rivals in a franchise battle.
- 1975
  - No events.
- 1976
  - 1 December – Bill Grundy’s infamous interview with The Sex Pistols takes place on Thames’ teatime magazine show Today.
- 1977
  - May – A strike occurs when production assistants at Thames refuse to operate new video equipment. Thames proceeded to sack all the technicians for breach of contract. The following month, both sides backed down over the issues, with all technicians returning to work.
  - 12 September – Today is replaced by a more conventional news magazine Thames at Six.
- 1978
  - 5 September – Thames launches a lunchtime regional news bulletin.
- 1979
  - 6 August – A strike, initiated at Thames, spreads to the entire ITV network, apart from Channel, forcing ITV off air for ten weeks.
  - Thames News at Six is renamed Thames News.

=== 1980s ===
- 1980
  - 28 April – A late night Thames News bulletin is launched. It had originally been planned to launch at the same time as the lunchtime bulletin but was delayed due to union problems.
  - 18 August – Sit Up and Listen launches as Thames’ closedown epilogue programme.
  - 2 October – Thames broadcasts a 10-hour Telethon to raise money for good causes in the London area.
- 1981
  - No events.
- 1982
  - 1 January
    - Thames (and LWT) are no longer able to broadcast to north west Kent due to the Bluebell Hill transmitter near Maidstone being transferred to the new Television South, as part of the creation of the South and South East franchise.
    - Thames loses 105 minutes of transmission time on Fridays when the handover to LWT is moved back from 7pm to 5:15pm.
  - 8 January – Due to the earlier Friday start, LWT becomes contractually responsible for providing a Friday London news service. Rather than launch its own news service, LWT pays Thames to provide a 15-minute insert into The Six O'Clock Show, LWT's Friday teatime magazine. The bulletin is called Thames Weekend News.
- 1983
  - 1 February – Following the launch of ITV's breakfast television service, TV-am, Thames’ broadcast day now begins at 9:25am.
- 1984
  - 27 August – The first of two strikes over new shift patterns takes place. It is resolved on 3 September.
  - 16 October – The Bill launches as a regular programme, just over a year after a one-off episode – Woodentop – was shown. It would run until 2010.
  - 17 October – Another strike begins over the same issue, and also over new technologies.
  - 19 October – A management-operated schedule is introduced. It broadcasts programming between around 1:30pm and around midnight as well as the ITV breakfast service TV-am. For the intervening four hours, instead of schools programmes, Thames viewers were left with a blue screen showing their upcoming emergency schedule. And with no access to ITN News, Thames viewers had to make do with short Thames News bulletins. Weekend ITV schedules for the London region are not affected by the strike, with London Weekend Television coming on air on Fridays at 5:15pm as usual.
  - 3 November – The strike finally ends, after 62 film editors agreed to the new conditions, while the ACTT agreed as well to start negotiations about the introductions of new technology. Additional episodes of network productions were screened to help clear the backlog.
  - The Thames ident is computerised.
- 1985
  - 3 January – Thames's last day of transmission using the 405-lines system.
  - January – Thames does a deal with the international distributors for American production company Lorimar to purchase the UK broadcasting rights for American drama Dallas, at that time transmitted on BBC1. This broke a gentlemen's agreement between the two sides not to poach each other's imported shows.
  - After Thorn EMI and British Electric Traction (BET) decide to reduce their share of Thames, Carlton Communications executes a failed takeover bid for Thames. The IBA, blocked the takeover, after concluding that 'the proposal would lead to a major change in the nature and characteristic of a viable ITV programme company'.
- 1986
  - 3 July – Thames is partially floated on the stock market. The shares on offer were the 71.2 stake of Thames that were being sold by BET and Thorn EMI.
  - 11 September – After an eight-year hiatus when it had evolved into TV Eye, This Week returns.
- 1987
  - 17 April – Ahead of its expansion into night-time broadcasting, Thames broadcasts its end-of-day epilogue, Night Thoughts, for the final time.
  - 1 June – Thames Television launches Thames Into the Night, broadcasting until around 4am. The output includes a news summary at 2am.
  - 17 August – Thames begins 24-hour transmissions.
  - 7 September – Following the transfer of ITV Schools to Channel 4, ITV provides a full morning programme schedule, with advertising, for the first time. The new service includes regular five-minute national and regional news bulletins.
- 1988
  - At the start of 1988, weekend contractor LWT launches its own regional news service, ending the agreement whereby Thames produced the Friday evening regional news insert into LWT's Friday night magazine programme The Six O'Clock Show.
  - 8 April – Thames transmits the controversial documentary Death on the Rock as part of its This Week series.
- 1989
  - July – To mark its 21st anniversary, the famous skyline ident is replaced with a new logo.
  - 1 September – Thames adopts the new corporate ITV logo.

=== 1990s ===
- 1990
  - 3 September – Thames launches what will be its final ident although it is initially only used to introduce local programmes. A modified ITV generic ident featuring this new logo is used for networked shows.
- 1991
  - April – Thames, in conjunction with LWT, launches a new overnight strand ITV Night Time.
  - 16 October – Thames controversially loses its ITV licence to Carlton Television due to it not being the highest bidder, on that same day, Thames announced that they would instead become an independent producer, which ultimately resulted in 1,000 jobs being lost.
  - 4 November – Following the announcement of the loss of its franchise, Thames drops the ITV-branded ident in favour of the local ident which is now used full time to introduce all programmes.
- 1992
  - Spring – Thames tries to continue as a television broadcaster by getting involved with a bid for the new Channel 5 licence. The bid is unsuccessful when the Independent Television Commission rejected it on concerns about its business plan and investor backing.
  - 1 November – Thames joins with the BBC to launch UK Gold. The channel shows programmes from the Thames and BBC archives.
  - 17 December – Ahead of the loss of its franchise, the final edition of the Thames Television-produced current affairs series This Week is broadcast.
  - 31 December – At 11:59pm, after showcasing some of its highlights over its many years on air, Thames stops broadcasting as after the chimes of Big Ben, the new licensee, Carlton Television takes over as licence holder for London weekdays.
- 1993
  - Thames starts operating as an independent producer meaning that many of its popular shows continue to be seen. These include Minder, The Bill and This Is Your Life, the latter continued to run on ITV until 1994 when ITV cancelled it. This Is Your Life was recommissioned by the BBC, with Thames continuing to produce it. The corporation ended the series in 2003. (Note: It was revived once again, this time by ITV Productions and SMG Productions for ITV in 2007, hosted by Sir Trevor McDonald, but failed after one series due to poor ratings.) The Bill continued to run on ITV until its cancellation in 2010.
  - 23 April – Thames Television is acquired by Pearson Television for £99 million. The acquisition is completed during the Summer.

=== 2000s ===
- 2003
  - 10 February – Thames is merged with Talkback to form a new production company Talkback Thames. The Thames name would be resurrected as a new company in 2012. Both companies however, continued to be used separately at the end of productions until 2006, with Thames being used for the company's entertainment and drama programming and Talkback being used for the company's comedy and factual programming.
- 2006
  - 4 January – The Thames and Talkback logos cease to be used independently after a new Talkback Thames logo is introduced, with all of the companies productions being produced under that name.

== See also ==
- History of ITV
- History of ITV television idents
- Timeline of ITV
- Timeline of ABC Weekend TV - Thames' production predecessor
- Timeline of London Weekend Television – supplying the weekend service against Thames' weekday service
- Timeline of Carlton Television – Thames' successor
- Timeline of television in London
