= Timeline of London Weekend Television =

This is a timeline of the history of the British broadcaster London Weekend Television (now known as ITV London at weekend). It has provided the ITV weekend service for London since 1968.

== 1960s ==
- 1967
  - LWT is awarded the London weekend franchise. The new franchise includes Friday evenings so LWT broadcasts from 7pm on Fridays as well as Saturday and Sunday.
- 1968
  - 2 August – LWT goes on the air, for fifteen seconds because that day was the start of the technicians strike which forces ITV off the air for several weeks although management managed to launch a temporary ITV Emergency National Service with no regional variations.
- 1969
  - 15 November – LWT begins broadcasting in colour.

== 1970s ==
- 1970
  - 18 September – LWT launches its famous river ident.
- 1971
  - February – Rupert Murdoch becomes managing director.
- 1972
  - 1 October – LWT launches the UK's first Sunday politics programme, Weekend World. It runs until 1988.
  - LWT opened its purpose-built studios called The London Studios although they were not fully operational until 1974. These new studios replace its studio base in Wembley which was the former home of Associated-Rediffusion.
- 1973
  - No events.
- 1974
  - The Independent Broadcasting Authority (IBA) automatically extends all ITV franchise contracts from 1974 to 1981, owing to the enormous costs of introducing colour television.
- 1975
  - No events.
- 1976
  - May – LWT is reorganised, to form a new company, LWT (Holdings) Limited. which allowed the company to expand into a number of new ventures, including Hutchinson Publishing.
- 1977
  - February – Michael Grade was appointed as Director of Programmes.
- 1978
  - 14 January – The first edition of arts magazine The South Bank Show is broadcast, replacing Aquarius. It continues to be broadcast until May 2010 before Sky Arts revives the programme in 2012.
  - November – News International sells 16% of its LWT holding, reducing its shares from 39.7% to 25%.
- 1979
  - 10 August – The ten week ITV strike forces LWT off the air. The strike ends on 24 October and LWT's acquisition of specialist travel and tour operator Page & Moy and its Hutchinson publishing operations helped offset the losses made during the strike.

== 1980s ==
- 1980
  - 11 February – London Weekend Television's Minorities Unit launches the UK's first television series specifically aimed at a gay audience. The programme, called Gay Life, airs late on Sundays and runs for two series.
  - News International sells its remaining 25% stake, bringing an end to LWT's connection with the Australian tycoon.
- 1981
  - No events.
- 1982
  - 1 January
    - LWT (and Thames) are no longer able to broadcast to north west Kent due to the Bluebell Hill transmitter near Maidstone being transferred to the new TVS, as part of the creation of the south and south east franchise.
    - LWT gains 105 minutes more transmission time on Fridays when the handover from Thames was moved back from 7pm to 5:15pm.
  - 8 January – Due to the earlier Friday start, LWT becomes contractually responsible for providing a Friday London news service. Rather than launch its own news service, LWT pays Thames to provide a 15-minute insert into The Six O'Clock Show, LWT's Friday teatime magazine. The bulletin is called Thames Weekend News. Over the weekend, LWT's news coverage consists of LWT News Headlines which are aired mid-afternoon and late evening. These bulletins usually consisted solely of the duty continuity announcer in-vision reading copy sourced from the Independent Local Radio station LBC and later from local wire agencies.
  - January – John Birt replaces Michael Grade as Director of Programmes and makes major changes to output aimed at maximising audiences with some niche programming, such as arts and science, moving out of primetime to the schedule margins to make way for more entertainment shows at peak time.
- 1983
  - January – LWT drops in-vision continuity.
  - 5 February – Following the launch of ITV's breakfast television service TV-am four days earlier, LWT's broadcast day now begins at 9:25am.
  - 9 September – LWT launches a computerised version of its ident with the tagline "Your Weekend ITV".
  - LWT launches an into-the-night Nightlife strand, resulting in LWT staying on air until around 2am on Friday and Saturday nights.
- 1984
  - 30 December – LWT's last day of transmission using the 405-lines system as by the time they return to air the following weekend, the service had been switched off.
- 1985
  - LWT comes to an agreement with TVS to help to fill its schedules with domestically produced programming while not having to increase its budget. This helps TVS to get more of its programmes onto the ITV network.
  - May–June – LWT's flagship Friday evening news magazine The Six O'Clock Show is briefly extended to Saturdays. However, only six episodes are broadcast.
- 1986
  - 29 August – After 16 years, LWT drops its river-based logo and launches a new ident.
- 1987
  - April – Greg Dyke returns to LWT after three years at TVS to replace John Birt as Director of Programmes.
  - 28 August – LWT begins 24-hour transmissions and launches the UK's first overnight show Night Network. However, it is short lived and ends on 31 March 1989.
  - December – Thames Weekend News, which had produced LWT's Friday teatime news bulletin, is broadcast for the final time.
- 1988
  - 8 January – Following concerns from the IBA over LWT's regional news output, LWT launches its own news service called LWT News. The service is outsourced and is provided by Screen News.
  - 15 July – The Six O'Clock Show is broadcast for the final time.
  - 7 October – The Six O'Clock Show's replacement programme, Friday Now!, launches.
- 1989
  - 28 July – Friday Now! is broadcast for the final time. It is axed due to poor ratings.
  - 1 September
    - LWT adopts the new corporate ITV logo.
    - Friday Now is replaced by Six O'Clock Live.

== 1990s ==
- 1990
  - January – Chrysalis Television takes over the contract to produce LWT News.
- 1991
  - April – LWT, in conjunction with Thames, launches a new overnight strand called ITV Night Time.
  - 16 October – LWT retains its licence. There had been one other applicant, London Independent Broadcasting. However, it was ruled out because it failed to make the quality threshold. It had bid five times more than LWT which retains the licence with a bid of £7.59 million.
- 1992
  - 24 April – LWT and Carlton Television create a 50/50 joint venture called London News Network to provide both franchisees with news and non-news regional programming.
  - 21 August – Six O’Clock Live is axed to make way for the forthcoming London Tonight.
  - 4 September – LWT launches a new ident, sometimes dubbed the flying blocks ident.
- 1993
  - 3 January – LWT News is broadcast for the final time.
  - 8 January – London Tonight is broadcast on LWT for the first time. It is the name of the new regional news bulletins produced by London News Network, the new seven days a week news service jointly owned by LWT and new contractor Carlton Television.
- 1994
  - 25 February – LWT is bought by Granada Television for £770 million. This resulted in Greg Dyke and Sir Christopher Bland leaving the company.
- 1995
  - No events.
- 1996
  - 30 August – LWT modifies its logo and new idents launch.
  - 1 October – LWT's owner Granada launches Granada Sky Broadcasting as a joint venture between Granada and BSkyB. Content from LWT's archives is shown on one of the channels created, Granada Plus.
- 1997
  - No events.
- 1998
  - 15 November – The public launch of digital terrestrial TV in the UK takes place.
- 1999
  - 12 November – LWT unveils what will be its last ever logo and launches new idents.

== 2000s ==
- 2000
  - 24 March – LWT becomes the only ITV region to drop the 1999 generic look, replacing it with the theme of a video wall.
- 2001
  - 11 August – ITV's main channel is rebranded as ITV1.
- 2002
  - 27 October – LWT marks its final day on air with a series of tributes to their past, with long-serving continuity announcers Glen Thompsett and Trish Bertram appearing in-vision live in LWT's playout centre in the London Television Centre. When GMTV handed over to the weekday franchise the following morning, 28 October, the national ITV1 brand was on-air. ITV1 (ITV1 London prior to regional programmes) is formed as a unified on-screen brand for the Carlton and LWT franchises. Consequently, the new "region" operates as a seven-day service. ITV London is formally created.
- 2003
  - No events.
- 2004
  - 2 February – Granada merges with Carlton Communications to form a single England and Wales ITV company called ITV plc.
  - 31 October – The LWT logo is seen by viewers for the final time. It had continued to appear as an endcap.

== See also ==
- History of ITV
- History of ITV television idents
- Timeline of ITV
- Timeline of ATV – LWT's predecessor
- Timeline of Thames Television – provided the weekday service for London 1968–1992
- Timeline of Carlton Television – provided the weekday service for London 1993–2002
- Timeline of television in London – includes the ITV London service after LWT's name ceased to be used
