= 1926 in British television =

This is a list of British television related events in 1926.

== Events ==
- 26 January – Scottish inventor John Logie Baird demonstrates his pioneering greyscale mechanical television system (which he calls a "televisor") at his London laboratory for members of the Royal Institution and a reporter from The Times.

== Births ==
- 25 January – Richard Davies, Welsh actor (died 2015)
- 2 February – David Whitfield, actor and singer (died 1980)
- 22 February – Kenneth Williams, comedy actor (died 1988)
- 8 May – David Attenborough, naturalist and broadcaster
- 14 May – Eric Morecambe, comedy performer (died 1984)
- 17 May – Tenniel Evans, actor (died 2009)
- 19 May – David Jacobs, radio and television presenter (died 2013)
- 29 May – Katie Boyle, 4-time presenter of the Eurovision Song Contest (died 2018)
- 10 June – Lionel Jeffries, actor, director and screenwriter (died 2010)
- 18 July – Robert Sloman, screenwriter and actor (died 2005)
- 18 July – Richard Pasco, actor (died 2014)
- 20 July – Patricia Cutts, actress (died 1974). First actress to play Blanche Hunt in Coronation Street
- 21 July – Bill Pertwee, actor (Dad's Army) (died 2013)
- 22 July – Bryan Forbes, director, producer, screenwriter and actor (died 2013)
- 6 August – Frank Finlay, actor (died 2016)
- 27 August – Pat Coombs, comic stooge (died 2002)
- 11 October - Earl Hyman, actor and voice actor (Thundercats, A Different World)(died 2017)
- 11 October - Jean Alexander, actress (Coronation Street, Last of the Summer Wine)(died 2016)
- 21 October – Leonard Rossiter, comedy actor and writer (died 1984)
- 20 November - Terry Hall, ventriloquist of Lenny the Lion (died 2007)
- 30 November – Sydney Lotterby, comedy producer (died 2020)
- 19 December – Stephen Lewis, comedy actor (On the Buses) (died 2015)

== See also ==
- 1926 in British music
- 1926 in the United Kingdom
