= Timeline of Carlton Television =

This is a timeline of the history of Carlton Television (now known as ITV London), and of its former owner Carlton Communications. Carlton Television has provided the ITV service for London on weekdays since 1993, and Carlton Communications took over the services for the Midlands, South West England, the West of England and Wales before merging with Granada plc to form ITV plc.

== 1980s ==
- 1985
  - 11 October – Carlton Television is set up by Carlton Communications to bid for an ITV franchise after the Independent Broadcasting Authority stops them from buying Thames Television.
- 1987
  - 16 March – Carlton Communications acquires 20 percent of Central Independent Television from Ladbrokes for £30million. This gives Carlton its first stake in a terrestrial broadcasting company.

== 1990s ==
- 1991
  - 16 October – Carlton Television is awarded the licence to provide London's weekday service by outbidding Thames Television. Carlton had not been the highest bidder as CPV-TV had bid just over £2 million more (£45.32 million compared to Carlton's £43.2 million) but it had failed to pass the quality threshold test.
- 1992
  - 24 April – Carlton Television and LWT create a 50/50 joint venture called London News Network to provide both franchisees with news and non-news regional programming.
- 1993
  - 1 January – At midnight, Carlton Television begins broadcasting.
  - 4 January – London Tonight launches as the new news service for both Carlton Television and LWT.
- 1994
  - January – Carlton Communications takes full ownership of Central.
  - 30 May – The Independent Television Commission criticises Carlton Television for providing a wide range of "unimpressive and very disappointing" programmes for the ITV network which were "neither distinctive nor noticeable high quality".
- 1995
  - 4 September – Carlton Television launches a new set of idents.
- 1996
  - 2 September – Carlton Food Network launches, becoming Carlton's first cable channel. It broadcasts for five hours each weekday afternoon, timesharing with SelecTV.
  - 25 November
    - Just over a year after its last ident refresh, Carlton Television launches a new set of idents.
    - London Today, a 30-minute lunchtime edition of London Tonight is launched.
    - Carlton Communications buys Westcountry Television.
- 1997
  - 31 January – Carlton Communications, Granada plc and satellite company British Sky Broadcasting (BSkyB), create British Digital Broadcasting (BDB) as a joint venture to operate three digital terrestrial television (DTT) licences.
  - 14 February – Carlton Select is launched. It replaces SelecTV which Carlton acquired when it bought Pearson Television.
  - 2 April – Carlton Communications buys Rank Film Distributors, including its library of 740 films, for £65 million.
  - 20 December – The ITC awards the sole DTT broadcast licence to British Digital Broadcasting. However, BSkyB had by now been forced by the ITC to pull out of the joint venture on competition grounds, effectively placed Sky's forthcoming digital satellite service in direct competition with the new service, although Sky was still required to provide key channels such as Sky Movies and Sky Sports to ONdigital.
- 1998
  - May – The Guardian publishes a series of articles alleging the wholesale fabrication of a 1996 Carlton Television documentary, The Connection which had purported to film the route by which heroin was smuggled into the United Kingdom from Colombia. An internal inquiry at Carlton found that The Guardian's allegations were in large part correct and the ITC, fines Carlton £2million. for multiple breaches of the UK's broadcasting codes.
  - 28 July – BDB announces that the DTT service will be called ONdigital.
  - 15 November – OnDigital launches and Carlton Communications launches three new channels for the service, Carlton Cinema, Carlton Kids and Carlton World. The service also carries Carlton Food Network and Carlton Select.
- 1999
  - January – Carlton Communications buys the ITC library from Polygram Filmed Entertainment which was in a process of folding into Universal Pictures.
  - 6 September – Carlton drops the Central and Westcountry names from their on-air presentation, rebranding these two regions under the "Carlton" name and using the same on-air presentation as Carlton Television for all three regions.

== 2000s ==
- 2000
  - 31 January – Carlton Kids stops broadcasting.
  - 1 February – Carlton World stops broadcasting.
  - 1 March – Carlton Select stops broadcasting and its hours on ONdigital are given over to Carlton Food Network, resulting in CFN becoming a full-time channel. On cable, the space vacated by Carlton Select is given to Carlton Cinema.
- 2001
  - May – Following the signing of a joint venture with supermarket chain Sainsbury's, Carlton Food Network is renamed Taste CFN.
  - 11 July – Carlton Communications and Granada plc relaunch OnDigital as ITV Digital in an attempt to better compete with Sky.
  - 11 August – ITV's main channel is rebranded as ITV1.
  - 1 December – Taste CFN stops broadcasting.
- 2002
  - 27 March – ITV Digital goes into administration.
  - 1 May – ITV Digital stops broadcasting.
  - 28 October – The remaining two ITV companies in England, Carlton and Granada, decide to drop all regional identities and replace them with a single ITV1 branding. Consequently, the London ITV region now operates as a seven-day service and is branded as ITV London although no ident featuring this branding is created. Instead, the region used plain generic idents seen by the rest of the country, without any regional variance identifying it as London, except for one junction after the launch of the 2003 network rebrand. However, the Carlton name continues to appear on endcaps and on presentation before regional programmes in the Midlands and South West regions.
- 2003
  - 31 March – Carlton Cinema stops broadcasting after Carlton was unable to get the channel onto the Sky platform.
  - 1 December – The Carlton name no longer appears on presentation before regional programmes in the Midlands and South West regions, although they branded as ITV1 for Central England and ITV1 for the Westcountry respectively, and the celebrity idents were replaced by the landscape idents.
- 2004
  - 2 February
    - Granada plc merges with Carlton Communications to form a single company ITV plc, which consequently owns all the Channel 3 franchises in England and Wales.
    - Carlton Television and LWT lose their identities into ITV London.
  - 31 October – The Carlton name is seen at the end of its own programmes for the final time. This brings to an end the use of the Carlton name on ITV after 11 years.

== See also ==
- History of ITV
- History of ITV television idents
- Timeline of ITV
- Timeline of Thames Television – Carlton's London predecessor
- Timeline of London Weekend Television – supplying the weekend service alongside Carlton's London weekday service
- Timeline of television in London – includes the ITV London service after Carlton's name ceased to be used.
