= 1928 in British television =

This is a list of British television related events in 1928.

== Events ==
| Month | Day | Event |
|---|---|---|
| February | 8 | John Logie Baird transmits television pictures across the Atlantic Ocean. The pictures are transmitted from Motograph House, London by telephone cable to Ben Clapp's station GK2Z at 40 Warwick Road, Coulsdon, Surrey, and then by radio to Hartsdale, New York, United States. |
| June | 12 | The first outside broadcast is made by John Logie Baird on his roof in 133 Long Acre, London, featuring the actor Jack Buchanan. |
| July | 3 | John Logie Baird demonstrates a colour television system achieved by using a scanning disc with spirals of red, green and blue filters at the transmitting and receiving ends. |
| September | 22 – 29 | John Logie Baird's Television Development Company demonstrates their model A, B, and C 'televisors' to the general public at the Radio Exhibition held at Olympia in London. The exhibition proves hugely popular, with an estimated nine hundred people per day watching the demonstration programming. |

== Births ==
- 3 January – Michael Barratt, English television presenter and announcer (died 2022)
- 27 January – Michael Craig, Indian-born actor and screenwriter
- 22 February – Bruce Forsyth, English entertainer and presenter (died 2017)
- 13 March – Ronnie Hazlehurst, English light music composer and director, theme tune composer (died 2007)
- 23 April – Bill Cotton, BBC television light entertainment producer and executive (died 2008)
- 30 April – Dickie Davies, English sports presenter (died 2023)
- 1 June – Bob Monkhouse, English comedian, screenwriter, actor and game show presenter (died 2003)
- 12 July– Frank Windsor, actor (Z Cars) (died 2020)
- 22 July – Freda Dowie, English actress (died 2019)
- 1 October – Laurence Harvey, Lithuanian-born screen actor (died 1973)
- 8 October – Bill Maynard, English comic actor (died 2018)
- 12 November – Bob Holness, South African-born English radio and television host (died 2012)
- 12 December – Lionel Blair, Canadian-born actor, choreographer, dancer and television presenter (died 2021)
- 29 December – Bernard Cribbins, English comedy actor (died 2022)

== See also ==
- 1928 in British music
- 1928 in the United Kingdom
- List of British films of 1928
