= Timeline of ITV Digital Channels =

This is a timeline of the British company ITV Digital Channels and its predecessors Granada Sky Broadcasting and Carlton Communications, and digital channels of other ITV-related companies. The timeline does not include events related to ITV network's flagship channel (ITV1 / STV / UTV).

== 1990s ==
- 1995
  - 13 December – Granada announces that it will form a joint-venture with BSkyB, known as Granada Sky Broadcasting. The venture will consist of seven channels, known as Health and Beauty, Home and Garden, Food and Wine, Granada Good Life, Granada Men and Motoring, Granada Talk TV, and Granada TV Shopping Guide. The flagship channel, Granada Gold Plus, would function as a rival to the BBC and Flextech's UK Gold and air programmes from the Granada Television and London Weekend Television archives. All seven channels are announced to launch on the Sky Multichannels service in 1996.
- 1996
  - January – Carlton Communications purchases cable television channel SelecTV for £5.2 million. The deal does not include the channel's parent company or their production and distribution divisions, which are sold separately to Pearson Television.
  - 2 September – Carlton Food Network launches. It broadcasts on weekday afternoons on cable.
  - 1 October – The GSkyB venture officially launches as a four-channel network - archive channel Granada Plus, Men's channel Granada Men & Motors, chat show channel Granada Talk TV, and lifestyle channel Granada Good Life. The remaining channels planned are instead launched as timeshared strands within Good Life schedule, and are known as Granada Food & Wine, Granada Health & Beauty, Granada TV High Street and Granada Home & Garden.
  - 1 November – A joint venture between SMG and BSkyB results in the launch of Sky Scottish. Airing for two hours on Sky between 6:00 pm and 8:00 pm, the channel was targeted towards Scots who lived outside Scotland.
- 1997
  - 14 February – SelecTV relaunches as Carlton Select.
  - 31 August – Granada Talk TV stops broadcasting.
  - 8 October – Granada Media considers selling a stake in GSkyB. The company proclaimed that the venture was costing the company millions of pounds.
- 1998
  - 9 April – BSkyB and SMG agree to terminate their Sky Scottish joint-venture due to poor viewing figures.
  - 1 May – The GSkyB networks gain newly refreshed looks, concluding with the relaunch of Granada Good Life as Granada Breeze, which sees the abolition of the four segments.
  - 31 May – Sky Scottish stops broadcasting.
  - 10 August – The launch of MUTV is officially announced. The channel, which is the first in the world to be exclusively dedicated to a single football club (Manchester United), is a joint venture between Granada, BSkyB, and the club; each holding a 33.3% stake.
  - 10 September – MUTV launches as a subscription-based service. Originally launching on cable, it would be added to Sky Digital upon its own launch on 1 October.
  - 15 November – The public launch of digital terrestrial TV in the UK takes place with the launch of ONdigital and as part of the 19-channel line-up, Carlton creates three new channels for the platform, Carlton Cinema, Carlton Kids and Carlton World and Granada, in conjunction with Littlewoods, opens Shop!.
  - 7 December – ITV2 is launched, but only in England and Wales. It operates as a single service with no regional content. It is a mixed genre channel and as well as being available on ONdigital, it is also carried on cable. It was only made available in Carlton and Granada-owned areas from the start.
- 1999
  - 4 January – GMTV2 launches during the breakfast downtime of ITV2.
  - 30 April – SMG launches S2 on ONDigital.
  - 28 June – Ulster Television plc launches UTV's sister channel, TV You. The channel mainly consisted of a simulcast of ITV2 with opt-outs for local programming.
  - September – Champions ON 28 and Champions ON 99 launch on the ONdigital service to provide live and recorded coverage of the UEFA Champions League.
  - 4 October – MUTV ceases broadcast on cable platforms due to low subscriber numbers. The Sky Digital version continues to operate.
  - 22 December – Carlton Communications announces the closure of the Carlton Kids and Carlton World networks due to poor viewing figures. They would be replaced with two new channels operated by Discovery Communications: Discovery Kids and Discovery Wings. Carlton also announced that Carlton Select will also cease operations for the same reason, and its slot would be taken over by Carlton Food Network, allowing the channel to broadcast around the clock.

== 2000s ==
- 2000
  - 31 January – Carlton Kids and Carlton World stop broadcasting, with the two new Discovery networks taking over the following day.
  - 1 March – Carlton Select stops broadcasting, with Carlton Food Network taking over afterward, thereby becoming an all day service.
  - 1 May – ONrequest launches to provide pay-per-view content for ONdigital viewers.
  - 1 August – The ITN News Channel goes on the air. The channel is a joint venture between ITN and NTL.
  - September – ONsport launches. It replaces Champions on 28 and Champions on 99 which had reflected the channel numbers these were broadcast on. These channels are rebranded as ONsport 1 and ONsport 2 after ONdigital had purchased the rights to the ATP Masters Series. Whilst ONsport 1 broadcasts 24 hours a day, ONsport 2 timeshares with Carlton Cinema and is only on air to provide coverage of an alternate Champions League match.
  - 28 September – Carlton enters into a joint-venture with supermarket chain Sainsbury's to relaunch Carlton Food Network.
  - Late-2000 – TV You is rebranded as UTV2, with no change in programming.
- 2001
  - 6 March – Granada Media signs a joint venture with pharmacy chain Boots to operate a television channel under the latter's Wellbeing brand alongside a website. Granada Media holds 40% in the venture.
  - May – Carlton Food Network relaunches as Taste CFN.
  - 11 July – Carlton and Granada relaunch OnDigital as ITV Digital in an attempt to better compete with Sky.
  - 27 July – SMG signs a carriage deal with Carlton Communications and Granada Media to allow ITV2 to launch in Scotland on ITV Digital. As such, S2 was shut down and affectively replaced by ITV2. The SMG-produced output moved exclusively to Scottish and Grampian.
  - 11 August – The ITV Sport Channel launches. It replaces ONsport and is a premium service rather than an add-on for ITV Digital customers. It fails to get carriage on Sky and Telewest but it does broadcast on NTL.
  - 15 August – Sainsbury's and Carlton disband their Taste CFN partnership due to poorer-than-expected revenues from advertising and e-commerce. The deal ended on 1 September, with Carlton regaining full ownership in the network while Sainsbury's would regain full ownership in the online-related assets.
  - 20 October – Carlton announces that they would close Taste CFN to free space for a new channel on ITV Digital. Granada Media is also reported to end its Wellbeing joint-venture.
  - 27 November – Granada Media and Boots officially announce the closure of Wellbeing, resulting in a £31 million loss for both companies. The channel struggled to gain viewers and ditched its original programmes in the summer. The website would remain in operation, with Boots taking full control.
  - 1 December – Taste CFN stops broadcasting.
- 2002
  - 23 January – Similar to SMG's deal the year prior, Ulster Television plc signs a carriage deal with Carlton Communications and Granada Media to allow ITV2 to launch in Northern Ireland on ITV Digital, replacing UTV2. The change was made two days later.
  - 14 March – Granada Media and Littlewoods announce the end of their partnership to operate Shop! and that the channel will close in April. Both companies cited that the channel did not meet their expectations.
  - 8 April – Shop! closes.
  - 23 April – ITV Select, launched originally as ONrequest, closes.
  - 30 April – Granada Breeze stops broadcasting.
  - 12 May – Following the collapse of ITV Digital, the ITV Sports Channel stops broadcasting.
  - 12 June – Granada Media and Carlton Communications purchase ITN's 65% stake in the ITN News Channel, which had been running at a loss for the company. NTL retains its existing 35% stake.
  - 30 September – The ITN News Channel relaunches as the ITV News Channel.
  - September – Carlton Cinema is removed from NTL's analogue cable platform.
  - 4 December – Carlton Communications announces they would close their last digital channel - Carlton Cinema. The channel's closure was due to the closure of ITV Digital and a failed deal to bring the channel to Sky Digital.
- 2003
  - 31 March – Carlton Cinema stops broadcasting.
- 2004
  - April – The newly created ITV plc purchases NTL's 35% stake in the ITV News Channel.
  - 1 November – ITV3 launches, replacing Plus which closes a few hours prior to ITV3's launch. Earlier that day, ITV had bought out BSkyB's stake in Granada Sky Broadcasting.
  - 8 November – ITV Digital Channels Ltd is formally launched following the closure of Granada Sky Broadcasting.
- 2005
  - 1 November – ITV4 launches but only as a part-time channel. Consequently, ITV2 relaunches as an entertainment channel following the transfer of sports coverage from ITV2 to the new channel.
  - 23 December – ITV News Channel stops broadcasting at 6pm. Poor ratings in comparison to BBC News 24 and Sky News and ITV's desire to reuse the channel's allocation on Freeview were cited as the reasons.
- 2006
  - 11 March – The CITV Channel launches on Freeview, Home Choice and Telewest. It starts broadcasting on Sky on 8 May and on NTL on 6 June.
  - 19 April – ITV Play launches.
  - June – ITV launches a trial high-definition channel, primarily to show matches from the 2006 FIFA World Cup.
  - 30 October – ITV2 and ITV3 launch +1 channels.
  - 30 November – The ITV HD trial broadcast ends.
- 2007
  - 13 March – ITV announces that ITV Play will permanently close down following recent concerns over participation television. On 16 March, its slot on Freeview is taken by the recently launched ITV2+1.
  - 16 March – ITV sells its stake in MUTV to the club for £3.3 million.

- 2008
  - 5 February – ITV4 becomes a 24-hour channel.
  - 17 July – ITV HD launches as a full-time service.
  - 1 December – ITV4 +1 launches.

== 2010s ==
- 2010
  - 1 April – Men & Motors and the full-time version of ITV HD stop broadcasting.
  - 2 April – the HD version of ITV1 launches.
  - 7 October – ITV2 HD launches.
  - 15 November – ITV3 HD and ITV4 HD launch.
- 2011
  - 11 January – ITV +1 is launched.
  - 14 November – ITV and JML Direct launch home shopping channel The Zone.
- 2013
  - 1 October – The Zone becomes The Store.
- 2014
  - 2 June – STV launches the first of its local television channels, STV Glasgow.
  - 9 June – ITV Encore launches, showing recent ITV drama productions.
  - 8 October – Reality channel ITVBe launches. Consequently, ITV2 is repositioned as a youth-focused entertainment channel.
- 2015
  - 1 January – UTV Ireland launches in the Republic of Ireland.
  - 12 January – STV launches its second local television channel, STV Edinburgh.
  - March – STV is awarded three more local licenses, to cover Aberdeen, Ayr and Dundee.
- 2017
  - 1 January – UTV Ireland closes and is replaced by be3.
  - 4 February – Following ITV's return to covering live boxing, the channel launches a pay-per-view channel ITV Box Office.
  - 24 April – STV merges its local channels and relaunches them as a single channel called STV2.
- 2018
  - 1 May – ITV Encore closes as a linear channel after four years on air. It continues as an on-demand service.
  - 30 June – STV2 stops broadcasting following That's TV's acquisition of the assets of STV's STV2 channel.
- 2019
  - January – ITV and JML Direct close The Store.

== 2020s ==
- 2020
  - 24 January – ITV announces that it has closed its pay-per-view service ITV Box Office.
  - 29 July – Merit launches as an evening service showing gardening and cookery programmes but less than a month after its launch, ITV sells the channel to Sky Group.
- 2022
  - 8 December — ITVX launches.
- 2023
  - 1 September – The CITV channel closes as part of ITV's plans to transition its children's output to a predominantly online model. A morning block of children's programming is introduced on ITV2, using the "CITV" brand, serving primarily to promote the online ITVX offering. The LittleBe strand within ITVBe continues.
- 2025
  - 9 June – ITVBe is replaced by ITV Quiz. Many of its programmes, which had mostly been reality shows, move back to ITV2.
- 2026
  - 10 April – The CITV block on ITV2 shuts down, ending the CITV brand as a whole permanently.

== See also ==
- Timeline of ITV
