= List of ITV channels =

ITV (Independent Television) is the original British commercial television network. Some of the franchise holders, most notably ITV plc and its predecessor companies Granada plc and Carlton Communications, launched other television channels, some with the ITV brand, some not.

== Current channels ==
=== ITV1/STV ===

The ITV network was launched in 1955 as a federal network of, eventually, fifteen mutually independent regional companies granted franchises either solely on a geographical basis or also on a weekday/weekend split basis. The franchises were reallocated several times and now all the franchises are owned by ITV plc and STV Group, and are branded as ITV1 (in England, Wales, Southern Scotland, Isle of Man and Channel Islands), STV (in Central and Northern Scotland) or UTV/ITV1 (in Northern Ireland). The network broadcasts a variety of programming, such as entertainment, dramas, documentaries, news, films and sport. A timeshift channel, ITV1 +1 / STV +1 / UTV +1 is available on Freeview, Sky, Freesat and Virgin Media.

==== ITV1 HD/STV HD ====

ITV1 HD is the simulcast high-definition television channel created by ITV. It was first trialled primarily to show the 2006 World Cup games to which ITV had the rights. It also showed looping previews, it began scheduled broadcasting on 9 June 2006 and ended on 30 November 2006. The full version was released as a simulcast on 17 July 2008 on all platforms.

STV launched their HD service in June 2010. STV HD broadcasts in Central and Northern Scotland on Virgin Media and Freeview. The channel was made available on the Sky and Freesat EPGs in April 2014.

UTV HD was launched in Northern Ireland in October 2010 exclusively to Virgin Media. It was later added to Freeview on 24 October 2012 after the completion of the digital switchover in the region.

=== ITV2 ===

In 1998, ITV launched its first new digital channel, known as ITV2. This combines more repeated and new entertainment and films as well as behind the scenes and imported programmes for the modern world. It is available on all digital services and broadcasts 24 hours a day. A timeshift channel, ITV2 +1, is available on Freeview, Sky, Freesat and Virgin Media. Before 2 August 2011, ITV2 +1 was only available on Freeview between 19:00 and 06:00, as it was forced to timeshare with CITV, and, in Scotland, TeleG (until it closed).

On 2 September 2023, the day after the closure of the CITV channel, ITV2 began broadcasting a daily, four-hour children's programming block, using the "CITV" brand. This runs from 05:00 until 09:00 every day.

ITV2 HD is the HD channel of ITV2, launched in 7 October 2010. Until 8 November 2022, it was a pay-TV channel. It is available free-to-air on Sky, Freesat and Virgin Media.

=== ITV3 ===

ITV plc's third channel was launched on 1 November 2004 as ITV3. It was initially thought that ITV3 would continue alongside Plus, broadcasting only on Freeview and cable, but at a last minute deal made it available on Sky, replacing Plus on all platforms (except Freeview). It usually broadcasts murder mysteries, classic dramas and movies. ITV3 is also available on all digital services and is available between 06:00 and 03:00, with teleshopping taking up the early hours of the day. A timeshift channel, ITV3 +1, is available on Sky, Freesat and Virgin Media.

ITV3 HD is the HD television channel of ITV3, launched in 15 November 2010 along with ITV4 HD. Until 8 November 2022, it was a pay-TV channel. It is available free-to-air on Sky, Freesat and Virgin Media.

=== ITV4 ===

ITV4 is a digital channel based targeted mainly at men. It began broadcasting on 1 November 2005. It broadcasts for the same amount of time as ITV3. It usually broadcasts sport events, archival programming, and, similarly to ITV3, movies. A timeshift channel, ITV4 +1, is available on Sky, Freesat and Virgin Media.

ITV4 HD is the HD television channel of ITV4, launched in 15 November 2010 along with ITV3 HD. Until 8 November 2022, it was a pay-TV channel. It is available free-to-air on Sky, Freesat and Virgin Media.

=== ITV Quiz ===

ITV Quiz is a digital channel dedicated to ITV gameshows. It launched on 9 June 2025, replacing ITVBe. This channel does not currently have a timeshift channel. It is available free to air on Sky, Freesat and Virgin Media.

== Defunct channels ==
The ITV network as a whole has owned other spin-off channels. Some were as joint ventures with other broadcasters; others were not.

=== With the ITV brand ===
==== ITVBe ====

ITVBe was a reality TV and lifestyle television channel from ITV plc, which launched on 8 October 2014 and defunct on 9 June 2025. The channel broadcasts reality shows that were previously broadcast on ITV2, such as Big Rich Texas, The Real Housewives franchise and scripted reality series The Only Way Is Essex. The channel was available free-to-air on Freeview, Sky and Virgin Media. A high-definition simulcast and timeshift channel, ITVBe HD and ITVBe +1, was also available.

On 3 September 2018, ITV introduced a new children's strand titled LittleBe, which is dedicated to British preschool programming on ITVBe.

ITVBe HD was the simulcast high-definition television channel of ITVBe. Until 12 December 2023, it was a pay-TV channel and exclusively on Virgin Media. It is available free-to-air on Sky, Freesat and Virgin Media.

The channel was closed on 9 June 2025 and was replaced by ITV Quiz.

==== CITV ====

The CITV channel was aimed at children under 12 years old, and broadcast daily between 06:00 and 21:00. The channel launched on 11 March 2006 at 09:25 with Holly & Stephen's Saturday Showdown, on Freeview, Virgin Media and TalkTalk TV. It then launched on Sky on 8 May 2006 at 06:00, with other platforms to follow. The channel replaced the ITV News Channel on Freeview. In February 2008 it was moved to a space originally held by ABC1, allowing ITV4 to go 24/7 on Freeview; however, this meant that it could no longer be received in Wales via Freeview because the channel would interfere with S4C if available in Wales. On 9 January 2012, a change in the FEC mode on the multiplex allowed CITV to broadcast in Wales on Freeview. The CITV channel closed on 1 September 2023, with programming moved to streaming service ITVX. A daily programming block was introduced on ITV2 from 2 September 2023, which went defunct on 10 April 2026, ending the CITV brand as a whole permanently.

==== ITV Box Office ====

ITV Box Office was a pay-per-view sports channel. It launched on 4 February 2017. On 24 January 2020 ITV announced that it had closed the channel via this message posted on the ITV Box Office web page: 'The ITV Box Office service has ceased as of 24 January 2020. There are no further plans to show any future events on this channel.'

==== ITV Encore ====

ITV Encore was a drama television channel from ITV plc launched on 9 June 2014. Unlike ITV's other channels it was available exclusively on Sky and Now TV, as part of their subscription packages. A high-definition simulcast and timeshift channel, ITV Encore HD and ITV Encore +1, was also available on Sky. Following an over-reliance on repeated content and less than stellar ratings, the channel closed on 1 May 2018 as part of ITV's plans to turn the channel into a box-set brand.

==== ITV News Channel ====
The ITV News Channel launched on 1 August 2000 under the name ITN News Channel. Carlton Television and Granada Television bought equal shares from ITN in the network and rebranded it ITV News Channel in September 2002. In April 2004 ITV bought NTL's 35 per cent share and took full control over the channel. The channel was closed on 23 December 2005 due to poor ratings and the launch of ITV4. It was replaced by ITV4 and CITV.

==== ITV Play ====

ITV Play was a 24/7 participation television channel in the United Kingdom. It launched on 19 April 2006 on Freeview, and was also available on Sky Digital. It was embroiled in a scandal involving overpriced premium-rate phone lines, by which ITV plc pulled the channel off air until further notice. The channel's closure was announced on 13 March 2007 and it closed on 15 March 2007. The channel was replaced by ITV2 +1 on Freeview. The brand "ITV Play" continued during late night quiz show slots on the ITV Network until December 2007.

==== ITV Select ====
This pay-per-view service on ITV Digital was formerly called ONrequest, which launched with ONdigital. It gave access to films, sport events and exclusive footage. It closed prior to the collapse of the platform due to ITV's financial difficulties and poor uptake.

==== ITV Sport Channel ====

The ITV Sport Channel originally launched in 1999 after ONdigital had acquired exclusive rights to screen every match from the UEFA Champions League. Two channels to show the matches were set up, entitled Champions on 28 and Champions on 99, reflecting the channel numbers these were broadcast on. Prior to the 2000–01 season, these channels were re-branded respectively as ONsport 1 and ONsport 2, after ONdigital had purchased rights to the ATP Masters Series tennis. On 11 August 2001, ONsport was closed and was replaced by the ITV Sport Channel, which launched as a subscription service. Lasting for just one football season; the ITV Sport Channel closed on Sunday 12 May 2002 with the Division 2 Play-off Final between Brentford and Stoke. Its failure caused the collapse of ITV Digital.

There were two spinoff channels, ITV Sport Plus and ITV Sport Select, the latter used to show the on-demand Premier League football matches from Sky Sports. Whilst football was the mainstay of the channel, it showed the ATP Masters Series, British basketball and European Cup rugby union.

=== Without the ITV brand ===
==== Merit ====

Merit launched in July 2020 exclusively on Freeview channel 34 that began broadcasting cooking and gardening programmes from 9pm to midnight. The license for the channel was bought by Sky UK less than one month later, in August 2020.

=== With the UTV brand ===
==== UTV2 ====

Formerly TV You, owned by UTV plc, this was the Northern Irish equivalent to ITV2. It closed after a deal was made to broadcast ITV2 in Northern Ireland.

==== UTV Ireland ====

UTV Ireland was a general entertainment channel available in Ireland. The channel was launched on 1 January 2015 and broadcast programmes from ITV Studios Global Entertainment such as Emmerdale and Coronation Street, often simulcast with the main ITV network. The channel was owned by ITV plc since February 2016, following the sale of UTV Media's television assets. In July 2016, ITV announced the sale of UTV Ireland to Virgin Media Ireland, owners of TV3. The channel was replaced by be3 on 9 January 2017. It was later renamed Virgin Media Three.

=== Carlton Communications ===
==== Carlton Cinema ====
This channel was owned by Carlton Communications showing classic cinema. It closed in 2003 after Carlton failed to reach a deal to broadcast the channel on the Sky platform.

==== Taste CFN ====
This was the first Carlton channel to be launched when it started on cable as the Carlton Food Network on 1 September 1996. Owned by Carlton Communications, showing cooking programmes, the channel was relaunched in 2001 as Taste CFN following the signing of a joint venture with the supermarket chain Sainsbury's. The channel was closed in late 2001 due to financial difficulties. It was never replaced on the ITV Digital platform.

==== Carlton Kids ====
This was owned by Carlton Communications showing children's television. The channel was closed in 2000 due to poor viewing figures. This channel, like Carlton World, was replaced by a timeshare of the now-defunct Discovery Kids and Discovery Wings on the ONdigital platform.

==== Carlton Select ====
This was a channel owned by Carlton Communications showing general entertainment programming. The channel was closed in 2000 due to poor viewing figures. Its OnDigital slot was used to provide extra hours for Carlton Food Network whereas on cable, the slot was given over to Carlton Cinema. The channel had originally launched in as a cable exclusive channel June 1995 as SelecTV but changed to Carlton Select in February 1997 and started on OnDigital when that platform went on air in late 1998.

==== Carlton World ====
This was a channel owned by Carlton Communications showing mostly factual programming. The channel was closed in 2000 due to poor viewing figures. It was replaced by a timeshare of the now-defunct Discovery Kids and Discovery Wings on the ONdigital platform.

=== Granada plc ===
==== Granada Breeze ====

Launched in 1996 as Granada Good Life, and split into four three-hour segments: Granada Food & Wine, Granada Health & Beauty, Granada TV High Street and Granada Home & Garden, this was a lifestyle channel aimed at female viewers and showed programmes on lifestyle, cookery, health and US daytime television such as Judge Joe Brown and later became known for showing paranormal shows. In 1998 the channel was relaunched as Granada Breeze. Cuts to the channel in 2001 saw original programming being dropped in favour of US imports, which greatly impacted the channel's ratings. It closed in January 2002 on Sky and ITV Digital due to poor viewing figures, but continued until April 2002 to honour contracts with NTL and Telewest.

==== Granada Plus ====
Owned by Granada Sky Broadcasting, a 50-50 joint venture between Granada plc and BSkyB, Granada Plus was a general entertainment channel aimed at older audiences and showed archived material. Originally from the Granada Television and London Weekend Television archives and shortly after, programmes made by Yorkshire Television, the channel soon began to show more recent programmes made by the ITV network, as well as programme stock which had been originally shown on the BBC. Classic US shows popular with British viewers we also added to the channel's output. Consequently, in 1999 the channel was renamed "G Plus" and in 2002 as "Plus".

It continued to broadcast until 1 November 2004, when ITV sealed a deal to buy out Sky's stakes in GSB to close down the channel in order for ITV's new channel, ITV3, to take Plus' low EPG position on Sky Digital. The channel was replaced on digital satellite and cable platforms, but a closedown slide continued to be available as late as 2010 on analogue cable.

==== Granada Men & Motors ====

Men & Motors was a men's lifestyle television channel in the UK. It was the last remaining station operated by Granada Sky Broadcasting after Plus became the third GSB channel to be closed down. A joint venture set up by Granada plc (now part of ITV plc) and BSkyB in 1996. Although ITV plc is now the sole owner of GSB, Sky will receive 49.5 per cent of any proceeds (net of liabilities) if Men & Motors is sold.

The channel was previously available on Freeview but was removed to make way for ITV Play which was then removed to make way for ITV2 +1, but was still available on Sky Digital and Virgin Media. While it was still broadcasting, it was available from 11:00 to 04:00 every day with ITV Nightscreen taking up the hours of 04:00 to 06:00 and a mixture of teleshopping and animated captions between 06:00 and 11:00.

Men & Motors was removed from Virgin Media on 25 March 2010, and closed on 1 April 2010 on Sky Digital and Freesat, making way for ITV1 HD.

==== Granada Talk TV ====

The last of the original GSB channels, Granada Talk TV focused primarily on chat shows. It ceased broadcasting on 31 August 1997 after less than a year on air.

=== Joint ventures with Granada Television ===
==== Shop! ====
Shop! was a home shopping channel which was a joint venture between Granada and Littlewoods. It ran from November 1998 to April 2002 and was replaced on Freeview by QVC.

==== Wellbeing ====
Wellbeing was a health and beauty focused channel, a joint venture between Granada and Boots which lasted just nine months on air in 2001.

==== Super Channel ====
This was a pan-European cable and satellite channel launched in 1987 by all of the ITV companies except Thames Television (who was a shareholder in the SES Astra satellite operator instead), with the assistance of BBC Worldwide (then Enterprises) and of a few other third parties, such as the independent music television producer Music Box. This channel aimed to beam a selection of the best of British television from both past and present (from both the BBC and ITV) to those living in mainland Europe. It was aimed both at foreign viewers and British expatriates, along with the syndicated ITN World News and a few other programmes coming from other European countries (such as Holland). However, the channel ran into severe financial difficulties almost from the start, with rights problems involving Equity demanding full payment of royalties for its archive programming, and poor viewing figures, advertising revenue and profits. The channel eventually had to scrap much of its BBC and ITV output, and after failing to achieve its expectations in 1988 the channel's British shareholders sold the entirety of its shares to the Italian consortium Beta Television, who changed its programming output completely, although it continued carrying the ITN World News and being based in London. In 1993, it was bought by the American broadcaster NBC, relaunching it as NBC Super Channel, later renaming it NBC Europe. It finally closed in 1998. (The BBC launched its own satellite service immediately after the failure of Super Channel, BBC TV Europe (later BBC World Service Television and BBC World).)

The Guardian newspaper speculated that the failure of Super Channel might have been a historical precedent to the bad luck that ITV has generally had with cable and satellite television.

=== Joint venture with JML ===
==== The Store ====
JML Store is a UK television shopping channel, in partnership with JML Direct Limited, and programming block on ITV. Dubbed the "chatmercial", The Store combines the format of a chatshow with home TV shopping in front of a studio audience.

The channel was first launched in November 2011 as "The Zone" exclusively on the Freeview platform, but was not available in Wales until 9 January 2012. On Tuesday 1 October, ITV rebranded the channel as "The Store", which also launched as a 24-hour channel on Freesat and Sky on the same day. The Freeview channel varies from the satellite feed, as it only broadcasts between 6 pm and 6 am, and airs the live casino programme Jackpot247 daily, between 10 pm and 3 am. On 1 August 2014, it was rebranded as "JML Store" on all platforms, except Freeview.

=== SMG plc/STV Group plc ===
==== Sky Scottish ====
A joint venture between Scottish Television and BSkyB, this was a general entertainment channel for the Scottish market and launched on 1 November 1996. Despite BSkyB and SMG entering into a seven-year contract to run the service, it closed after 18 months due to poor viewing figures and for failing to reach financial targets.

==== S2 ====
Owned by SMG plc (now known as STV Group plc), this was the Scottish equivalent to ITV2. The channel simulcasted the vast majority of ITV2 programmes, albeit covering the ITV2 DOG with its own. It closed after a deal was made to broadcast ITV2 in Scotland.

== See also ==
- List of former TV channels in the United Kingdom
