= History of Freeview UK =

History of British free-to-air television services

Freeview is the collection of free-to-air services on the digital terrestrial television platform in the United Kingdom. The service was launched at 5 am on 30 October 2002 and is jointly operated by its five equal shareholders – BBC, ITV, Channel 4, BSkyB and transmitter operator Arqiva.

== 2002 ==
Following the collapse of ITV Digital, the Independent Television Commission re-advertised the licenses for the three multiplexes (MUX B, C and D) that had been used by ITV Digital. On 16 August 2002 the licenses were granted to members of the Freeview consortium, with BBC getting multiplex B and Crown Castle getting multiplexes C and D.

Although all pay channels had been closed down on ITV Digital, many free-to-air channels continued broadcasting, including the five analogue channels, the digital BBC channels, ITV2, the ITN News Channel, S4C2, TV Travel Shop and QVC.

Freeview launched on 30 October 2002 at 5 am. Sky Travel, UK History, Sky News, Sky Sports News, The Hits and TMF were available on the launch, however many channels originally available have since been removed. BBC Four and the interactive BBC streams were moved to multiplex B. Under the initial plans, the two multiplexes operated by Crown Castle would carry eight channels altogether.

== 2003 ==
In February 2003, BBC Three replaced BBC Choice, which since February the previous year had no longer contained children's programming, as the job was fulfilled by the CBBC and CBeebies channels.

The seventh stream became shared by UK Bright Ideas and Ftn which launched in January 2003. The eighth stream was left unused until April 2004 when the shopping channel Ideal World launched on Freeview. There are now 13 streams carried by the two multiplexes, with Multiplex C carrying 5 streams, and Multiplex D carrying 8.

== 2004 ==
Pay television returned to the terrestrial platform in March 2004 when Top Up TV launched. The BBC and Crown Castle multiplexes were at the time not allowed to broadcast pay channels, so the new service broadcast on multiplex A and Channel 4's half of multiplex 2. On June 14, 2004, Cartoon Network launched onto Freeview. The autumn of 2004 saw the launch of two new free-to-air entertainment channels; ABC1 in September and ITV3 in November. ITV3 was the replacement for Plus on platforms other than Freeview.

== 2005 ==
In early 2005, two new channel streams became available on the two Crown Castle multiplexes. ITV and Channel 4 won one stream each. ITV used their channel to broadcast Men & Motors. Channel 4's entertainment channel E4 had up until this time been broadcast as part of the Top Up TV package, and at this time it was decided that E4 would be made free-to-air, as well as being available on Freeview along with E4 +1 which was launched at the same time in the newly acquired stream. They also launched a 24-hour live stream of the Big Brother house, which was later replaced by quiz channel Quiz Call.

In the autumn of 2005 Channel 4 and ITV joined the Freeview consortium. They also launched two new channels, More4 and ITV4, respectively. Sky replaced Sky Travel with the broader entertainment channel Sky Three.

Another stream became available on the Crown Castle multiplexes. Channel 4 won the bidding for this stream, which reportedly reached £12 million per year. The space was initially used to broadcast More4 +1.

The ITV News Channel had seen its broadcasting hours reduced to daytime after the launch of ITV4. It stopped broadcasting on 23 December 2005 at 6 pm and the space was taken over by CITV in March 2006.

Toonami was launched on Freeview on December 7, 2005.

== 2006 ==
ITV Play was launched in April 2006, and Men & Motors was taken off Freeview to make way for this to happen. FilmFour ceased its subscription service in mid-2006. Also, at the same time, it launched on Freeview and changed its name on all platforms to Film4, and introduced commercials during films for the first time. It also reduced its broadcasting hours to 12:45 – 08:45 so National Lottery Extra and Gems TV could launch. On Freeview, it replaced More4 +1, although the space was briefly used for Big Brother coverage before it was launched on Freeview.

Five had bought a stake in the company behind the Top Up TV service, and in the autumn of 2006 it was restructured into a video on demand service. This made space for Five to launch two new channels in October, which were Five Life and Five US (now known as 5star and 5 USA respectively).

Quiz Call was sold in November 2006, however because the deal did not include the Freeview slot it meant it had to close down. The space was then used by Film4 +1.

== 2007 ==
ITV Play stopped programming in the early hours of 6 March 2007. Originally, it was to return later in March, but it was decided it would close down for good, with it being removed from the EPG on 16 March 2007. The slot got reused for a one-hour timeshift of ITV2, ITV2 +1, shortly afterwards.

Toonami was renamed Cartoon Network Too in June 2007.

Channel 4 replaced Film4 +1 with Channel 4 +1 in August 2007.

Disney decided to leave Freeview and unexpectedly closed down ABC1 shortly after midday on 26 September 2007, days before it was supposed to close down on 1 October 2007.

Ftn was replaced by Virgin1, UKTV Bright Ideas was closed down, UKTV History had its broadcasting hours restricted to daytime and UKTV G2 was launched on Freeview under the new name Dave.

Additionally, in December 2007, the Jewellery Channel was made available on Freeview on channel 44.

== 2008 ==
CITV eventually moved into ABC1's old space, allowing ITV4 to broadcast 24/7. Because the slot that CITV moved into would interfere with S4C if available in Wales, it means that CITV can now only be received using Freeview in England, Scotland and Northern Ireland. CITV continues to be available in Wales on all other platforms.

The Jewellery Channel was removed in May 2008 because the broadcast license was not renewed, and was replaced by a second stream of Gems TV, which was referred to inside the EPG as "GEMSTV1".

The Hits was renamed 4Music in August 2008.

== 2009 ==
In January 2009, price-drop tv was replaced by Quest, gambling service Super Casino launched in new space on the SDN multiplex, Turner channel Nuts TV was closed and replaced with four-hours of news channel CNN International, and Arqiva announced that their latest new channel slot had been sold to UKTV who now use it to broadcast Dave ja vu (originally Dave +1, and is a one-hour timeshift of Dave). Then, Russia Today TV announced that they were going to broadcast for a small amount of time during the day, timesharing with Dave +1. Also, January saw NETPLAY TV launch on channel 49, timesharing with Super Casino on 48. This shows Rocks&Co and various JML presentations throughout the day. Finally, Directgov launched on channel 106.

Quest, was due to launch on Channel 47 on 14 May. Following the broadcast of a preview loop from 7 am, the channel launch was suspended at 10 am by its channel owners, who stated that the channel would be delayed until later in the year due "to a number of commercial factors". The channel successfully launched on 30 September 2009.

After Quest was launched, Film4 broadcast hours were extended to 9:45 am to 8:45 am (although films were only broadcast between 11 am and around 4 am), as Gems TV changed its schedule to broadcast during Quest's downtime (between 1 am and 11 am). Film4 now, instead of closing down in downtime hours, instead broadcasts teleshopping or an animated caption stating it will return at 11 am. Around the same time, Gems TV ceased its second stream and was replaced by extended coverage of CNN.

On 20 May Virgin1 went 24 hours on Freeview, with a timeshifted version of the channel on channel 35 between 6 pm and 6 am. However, it was, later in the year, reduced back to 9 am to 7 pm in Wales and to 7 am to 3 am for the rest of the UK, allowing Tease Me TV to launch.

On 15 July 2009, quiz channel Big Deal launched on channel 37 between 10 pm and 5 am, timesharing with Create and Craft and Russia Today.

Freeview underwent a major multiplex re-configuration on 30 September 2009, which required all Freeview users to retune. This cleared multiplex B (aka PSB3 aka BBCB) to run in DVB-T2 mode, and moved all BBC television and radio services to multiplex PSB1 (BBCA) in post-DSO areas. Five moved to multiplex 2/PSB2/D3+4, swapping with ITV3 which ended up on multiplex A/COM4/SDN. ITV4 moved to Multiplex D/COM6 swapping with ITV2 +1, which ended up on Multiplex 2/PSB2 (in ITV plc areas ITV2 +1 moved to LCN 33 in anticipation that it would become ITV1 +1). 18 million households were required to retune their television sets on or after midday on 30 September. The changes lead to several hundred complaints from people who had lost channels as a result of retuning their equipment.

To make room for the HD channels, the number of interactive BBC streams was reduced from 4 to 2 in pre-DSO areas and 1 in post-DSO areas, and the Community Channel became inaccessible to post-DSO areas. However, as the Community Channel later switched multiplexes from B to C, it was restored to post-DSO areas.

Freeview HD started broadcasting on 2 December 2009, when BBC HD and ITV HD started transmission to parts of the country.

== 2010 ==
In February 2010 National Lottery Extra ceased to exist. The channel was replaced by extended coverage of Film4, which became 24/7 once the channel stopped, but continued to show just teleshopping and animated captions between around 4 am and 11 am.

Channel 4 HD joined the platform on 30 March 2010. A few days later, on 2 April, ITV1 HD launched as a standard channel on all platforms. The high-definition version of S4C, Clirlun, launched on 30 April 2010.

Five HD was originally planned to be the fourth HD channel to launch on Freeview. But in March, it was revealed that Five HD would not be launching in 2010. The other applicant, Film4 HD, was also unable to launch. The commercial public service broadcasters will be able apply to the launch of another HD service in 2012, when a fifth HD stream is expected to become available.

The fourth HD channel slot was automatically given to the BBC, who, on 28 May, announced that they intended to use the space to launch a high-definition simulcast of BBC One in the autumn.

During June 2010, 4TVInteractive ceased broadcasting on the platform on channel 300. It was used to provide up to 14 days worth of EPG data to compatible receivers between 3 am and 4 am. Receivers which relied solely on this data and are not compatible with the standard 8-day EPG requirement for products with digital tick are no longer able to provide advance EPG data.

On 1 July 2010, Al-Jazeera English launched on the platform and Russia Today extended its hours to broadcast 24 hours a day, 7 days a week.

During August 2010, Sky Sports 1 and 2 were made available on digital terrestrial television via BT Vision and Top Up TV.

On 23 August 2010, Sky Sports News was removed from the platform due to it becoming a pay TV channel. The slot was then reused for a 1-hour timeshift of Sky3, called Sky3 +1.

On 3 September 2010, Virgin1 changed their name to Channel One. This was because its new owner, Sky, was not entitled to use the Virgin name in their channels.

On the midnight after 13 November 2010, CNN International was removed from Freeview.

On 30 November 2010, S4C2 was removed from Freeview, for this being because its live coverage from the National Eisteddfod and Royal Welsh show would be more heavily featured on the main S4C channel. It ceased broadcasting on all remaining platforms on 6 December 2010.

== 2011 ==
ITV launched their timeshift channel for ITV1 which is called ITV1 +1 on 11 January 2011. To make way for the timeshift, ITV2 +1 no longer broadcast for 24 hours a day and changed its hours to 7 pm to 6 am. However, ITV2 +1 restored its 24/7 status on 2 August 2011 as a new eleventh stream became available on the multiplex.

Channel One began to leave Freeview across the country, starting with Wales on 31 January 2011 at 7 pm and finishing with the rest of the country on 1 February 2011 at 3 am. On the other platforms, Channel One continued until 1 February 2011 at 6 am with its one-hour timeshift, Channel One +1, ceasing broadcasts at 7 am the same day. On Freeview, the slot was used to launch Challenge. Challenge launched at 9 am the day Channel One stopped broadcasting.

Sky3 & Sky3 +1 became Pick TV & Pick TV +1 at 6 am on 28 February 2011.

The Scottish Gaelic channel BBC Alba was launched in Scotland on 8 June 2011, replacing TeleG, which had been on channel 8 in Scotland from the launch of Freeview. To make room for the launch, all radio stations owned by BBC (except BBC Radio 1Xtra, BBC Radio 5 Live and BBC 6 Music) now only operate between midnight and 5 pm (6 pm on weekends). However, the radio stations are only affected when watching in Scotland via Freeview.

Gems TV stopped timesharing with Quest on 30 June 2011, as a new stream became available on the multiplex.

Food Network launched on channel 49 on 7 July 2011, broadcasting between 6 pm and 10 pm.

Really launched on channel 20 on 2 August at 10 am, reducing Dave ja vu to a two-hour service between 2 am and 4 am.

Pick TV +1 closed on channel 44 on 20 September 2011 at 2 pm. This allowed all channels owned by Sky to be on multiplex C as well as Challenge to go 24 hours in Wales.

On 21 September 2011, the Jewellery Channel was restored to Freeview, this time being on channel 60. The channel replaced Challenge's old slot on multiplex A.

In October 2011, Daystar silently closed on channel 47. The channel however continues to broadcast on other platforms.

== 2012 ==
Movies4Men, Movies4Men +1, Movies4Men2 and Movies4Men 2 +1 all closed in January 2012 on the local multiplex that broadcasts in Manchester. Movies4Men 2 and Movies4Men 2 +1 closed themselves in May of that year. Movies4Men and Movies4Men +1 returned in 2014.

4seven launched on channel 47 with a placeholder channel on 2 April 2012 in post-switchover areas, and officially launched on 4 July 2012.

== 2013 ==
ITV1 was renamed ITV in January 2013.

BBC Two HD launched on 26 February on channel 102 replacing BBC HD

Drama launched on 8 July on channel 20 replacing GOLD which moved to channel 26. This then caused the previous channel 26 station Home to be moved to new channel number 54. This also caused Dave ja vu to reduce its broadcast hours

Film4 moved to multiplex 2, making the channel more widely available in the UK

Travel Channel launched on channel 42 with limited broadcast hours of 6 pm to 10 pm.

True Entertainment launched on channel 61, making it the first CSC Media Group channel to launch on the platform

Pay TV provider Top Up TV closed on 31 October after nine years of providing extra pay TV content. Most Top Up TV set top boxes will still be able to receive Freeview channels

In July 2013 Ofcom announced that they would make some of the spectrum freed up from the analogue switchover to launch two additional terrestrial multiplexes that could carry ten high-definition channels. The BBC subsequently announced that it would launch high-definition versions of BBC Three, BBC Four, BBC News, CBBC and CBeebies. All these channels launched on 10 December 2013, with BBC Three and CBBC using vacant capacity on BBC's existing multiplex, while the others used the new capacity.

One other HD channel, Al Jazeera English, had launched in November, also using the new multiplexes.

== 2014 ==
Channel 5 +24 launched on 4 February on channel 55. Between 7 pm and midnight, it broadcasts the previous day's Channel 5 schedule.

Movies4Men returned to Freeview nationwide. It had previously been Manchester only.

Pop launched on 20 March 2014, making it the 8th children's channel (other than HD Channels) to launch on Freeview.

Shop at Bid and Price Drop closed on 17 April 2014, with the channels being removed from the EPG on 25 April 2014.

On 8 May 2014, Chart Show TV launched, but timeshares with Pop meaning it is night-time only. This arrangement was short-lived as Chart Show TV is now only available on the Manchester Stream. Pop became a 24/7 channel in the process.

Tiny Pop launched on 20 October 2014, making it the 9th children's channel (other than HD channels) are launched on Freeview.

== 2015 ==
On 12 February 2015, Freeview changes its logo.

== 2016 ==
BBC Three closed down on 31 March 2016. It had carried promotional information regarding the online-only service of the same name from 16 February 2016. However, due to the closure of BBC Three, some channels on Freeview moved to channel 7 or 8, depending on their locations. The spot for 105 was used for Channel 5 HD.

Kix launched on 20 April 2016, making it the 10th children's channel (other than HD channels) to launch on Freeview.

== 2017 ==
On 15 March 2017, Tiny Pop moved to the local TV multiplex meaning that cities with no local TV channel on either channels 7 or 8 no longer could access the channel.

CBS Action gained a timeshift channel on channel 90 which meant that CBS Drama had to move multiplexes so that the timeshift channel could broadcast. It moved from the COM7 multiplex to the COM6 one.

Quest Red launched on Freeview channel 38. Quest+1 moved to 92 only being 3 hours a day (5 am – 8 am).

Colors HD launched on COM8. TJC Choice launched on channel 93 on 22 March.

BT Showcase went defunct on 9 May, being replaced by BT Showcase HD at COM8.

On 30 August 2017, Kix was renamed Pop Max, with signs of change for programmes.

== 2018 ==
On 3 January, True Christmas reverted to True Movies. Eight days later, Together launched as a placeholder service. Also, two BBC HD channels (BBC Four HD and CBeebies HD) moved multiplexes from COM7 to COM8. VIVA left Freeview as it became MTV OMG, a pay-tv channel. This also meant that 5USA+1 extended its hours. On the second of February, 5Spike+1 launched as a placeholder service, lasting 2 hours a day. The Vault moved multiplexes becoming Manchester only. On 1 March, Pick's timeshift service returns to Freeview. Quest HD was launched in July.

== 2019 ==
The GREAT! channels were launched and went onto Freeview.

== 2020 ==
On 15 April, CCXTV is launched by Ideal World as an entertainment channel. It took over Create and Craft's Freeview LCN 23, broadcasting from 0700 until 2200, with a schedule of imports and re-runs of shows like The Bold and The Beautiful, On 17 September, Sky Arts launches on Freeview.

== 2021 ==
On 1 February, CCXTV closes and its Freeview slot is allocated to Drama +1.

== 2022 ==
On 3 March, RT UK is removed from all broadcast platforms in the UK as part of a Europe-wide crackdown on Russian propaganda and in response to the 2022 Russian invasion of Ukraine. In March, W becomes a free-to-air channel and launches on Freesat prior to its launch on Freeview on 28 March.

On 29 and 30 June, numerous changes are made, some relating to the withdrawal of the COM7 broadcast multiplex, which led to services including FreeSports, Quest HD, BBC News HD and More4 +1 becoming unavailable on Freeview whilst continuing on other platforms; Forces TV closed on all its platforms at 11 am on 30 June, whilst PBS America +1 and QVC Beauty HD effectively closed altogether as they had broadcast only via COM7 and were not carried elsewhere. BBC Four and CBeebies HD moved to Multiplex B.

Additionally, the 4Music channel as broadcast on Freeview and elsewhere was replaced by E4 Extra, with a new 4Music continuing on satellite and cable in place of Box Hits; and AMC Networks International replaced Horror Channel with Legend, renaming CBS Drama as RealityXtra and moving it to be available in local-TV areas only, and withdrawing CBS Justice.

In November, ITV's name was changed back to ITV1

== 2023 ==
Smithsonian Channel closes on 6 January.

On the 22 March, local news became available on BBC One HD in some regions

On 21 June 2023, Great! TV became available nationwide on Freeview

On 19 July 2023, POP began being available only in local areas, along with the return of Pop Max on Freeview in local areas, and Great! Romance went nationwide on Freeview

On 1 September (or 31 August), ITV closed its children's channel CITV after 17 years (and 40 years as a strand on ITV1/STV) later in the year to move children's content to ITVX. In addition to this, it was also announced that children's programmes would be broadcast in a morning slot on ITV2. This began on 2 September 2023 at 5am, the night after the closure of the CITV channel.

After the closure of the CITV channel, ITVBe+1 began broadcasting from 5am to 9pm. This happened up until 29 November 2023, when ITV reduced broadcasting hours of ITVBe+1 and ITV3+1 to 2am-4am and 4am-6am, respectively. In addition, ITV2+1 stopped broadcasting 24/7 on Freeview as ITV cleared up a slot for ITVBe+1 and ITV3+1 to timeshare with it.
