= Carlton World =

British TV channel

Ownership
- Owner: Carlton Television (subdivision of Carlton Communications plc)

History
- Launched: 15 November 1998; 27 years ago
- Closed: 1 February 2000; 26 years ago
- Replaced by: Discovery Wings

Availability (At time of closure)

Terrestrial
- ONdigital: Channel 34

Carlton World was a British digital television channel, launched on 15 November 1998 and closed down on 1 February 2000. Its sister channels were Carlton Kids, Carlton Food Network, Carlton Select and Carlton Cinema. It was carried on ONdigital channel 34, and timeshared with Carlton Kids, broadcasting nightly between 7pm and midnight.

== Programmes ==
Carlton World broadcast factual and some entertainment programming produced or commissioned by Carlton and its merged companies, including Central Independent Television and Westcountry Television, although it was not unusual for programmes from other ITV network companies to be featured on the channel.

== History ==
It was carried on both analogue and digital cable prior to ONdigital's launch. The channel had limited coverage, reaching only 69% of the population via the lowest-powered terrestrial multiplex D, and newspapers and listings magazines were slow to feature the channel's programming. Carlton World, along with Carlton Kids, closed in 2000 due to poor viewership and financial difficulties and this was partly due to the limited uptake of the ONdigital platform where it was exclusively available, and where the channel was replaced with Discovery Kids and Discovery Wings. On Carlton's television platform, ONdigital, the capacity was replaced by Discovery Wings. The remainder of the ONdigital-exclusive Carlton channels closed over the next few years. and Carlton Communications merged with Granada plc in 2004, forming ITV plc. Programming from Carlton World was absorbed into ITV plc's Digital Channels.
