= ONmail =

British email service

ONmail was a television-based email service run by ONdigital via their set-top boxes (STBs). It was launched on 7 March 2000 and required the user to purchase a new remote control with a slideout keyboard to type on. It used the built-in 2400 bit/s modem in the set-top box to connect to the ONdigital email centre. The service continued until 22 May 2002, when the phone line stopped accepting incoming calls following the collapse of the then-now rebranded ITV Digital on 3 May 2002.

== Service launch ==
The service became available via an over-the-air update to the ONdigital set-top box which added the OnMail interface. This was in addition to the already existing 'Inbox', which could be accessed via the main menu. This menu was never used due to limitations of the existing software.

== Interface ==
The onscreen interface was accessed via the ONdigital menu system (as opposed to the system menu which access the 'Inbox' described above). The interface was in a purple colour, as opposed to the standard green that the rest of the ONdigital software used. The user could thus distinguish it from the television functionality of the box, and because the contrast in colours made text easier to read.

== Limitations ==
The system had clear limitations in many aspects. The main one was that it could only be used to access ONmail accounts, which had the addresses @onmail.co.uk. Additionally, a problem that became increasingly salient as the service aged was that there was no way of accessing attachments via the set-top box interface. This was not only because of the limited interface, but also because of the slowness of the inbuilt modem.

== Move to ONnet ==
With the launch of the ONnet Service in June 2000, and the replacement of the 2400bit/s modem with the plug-in 56K modem of the new ONnet plug-in box, the ONmail service became accessible on set-top boxes through the ONmail web site. The website (www.onmail.co.uk) provided additional features that were lacking in the set-top box interface. Though this caused most users to switch to accessing the service through ONnet, many people still used the original interface as not all users had purchased an ONnet box. This was exacerbated by the impending launch of broadband services and the comparatively limited modem integrated in the new box.
