= ITV Sport Channel =

British sport television channel

- Country: United Kingdom

Ownership
- Owner: Carlton Communications (50%); Granada plc (50%)
- Sister channels: ITV Sport Plus; ITV Sport Select

History
- Launched: 11 August 2001; 25 years ago
- Closed: 11 May 2002; 24 years ago

Availability at time of closure

Terrestrial
- ITV Digital: Channel 20

ITV Sport Channel was a short-lived sport television channel that was owned by Carlton Communications and Granada plc. It was launched on 11 August 2001 and closed on 12 May 2002, precipitating ITV Digital's collapse a month later.

The channel was mostly devoted to football, but also included other sports, and it had two sister channels - ITV Sport Plus and ITV Sport Select.

Matt Smith, Tony Dorigo, Russell Osman, Bob Wilson, John Hendrie, Garry Nelson, Guy Havord, Guy Mowbray, Peter Drury, Jon Champion, David Fairclough, Paul Walsh, Jim Beglin, Simon Hill, Peter Stevenson, Carrie Frais, Lisa Rogers and Dave Beckett presented and commentated for the channel.

== History ==
=== Champions Channel/ONsport ===
In February 1999, ONdigital announced that it had secured a four-year exclusive deal to screen every match from the UEFA Champions League, supplementing ITV's existing coverage of the competition. and at the end of September 1999, two channels were launched to show the games, entitled Champions on 28 and Champions on 99, with the numbers at the end reflecting the channel numbers they were broadcast on. Champions on 99 aired full time on its own transponder but Champions on 28 timeshared with Carlton Cinema and only aired on Tuesday evenings to allow for a second Champions League match to be shown. Eventually, Champions on 28 was moved to Channel 98 to be next to its sister channel, and was rebranded as Champions on 98, and the broadcasting capacities for both networks were swapped over.

As 2000 rolled by, the channels were rebranded as ONsport 1 and ONsport 2, after ONdigital had purchased rights to ATP Masters Series tennis.

=== ITV Sport Channel ===
In June 2000, ONdigital successfully outbid BSkyB for the rights to show live matches from The Football League and the League Cup, for a massive £315m over three seasons, at least five times more than any broadcaster had previously bid for it and in April 2001, a stand-alone subscription channel, the ITV Sport Channel, was announced to broadcast the matches, along with the Champions League coverage that ONdigital had been showing. The launch of the channel coincided with the rebranding of ONdigital to ITV Digital.

The ITV Sport Channel officially launched on 11 August 2001 with Manchester City v Watford in the First Division as the game shown. The channel was also available on NTL cable but it did not broadcast on Sky or on Telewest.

The former ONsport 1 and ONsport 2 networks were renamed as ITV Sport Plus and ITV Sport Select, and remained exclusive to the service. ITV Sport Select showed the on-demand Premier League football matches from Sky Sports and ITV Sport Plus was available without additional charge to allow viewers to watch a match or sport event if there was a scheduling conflict.

On 27 July 2001, the channel launched in the two SMG areas in most of Scotland, then on 22 January 2002, in Northern Ireland.

=== Closure ===
The cost of the Football League deal proved one too many a burden for the struggling ITV Digital. The Football League refused to accept a £130m pay cut in its £315m deal with the network, and this financial burden would cause ITV Digital itself to be placed into administration on 27 March 2002. The collapse caused severe financial difficulties for lower-division football clubs who had budgeted for large incomes from the television contract.

Despite the closure of the majority of the subscription channels on ITV Digital on 1 May 2002, the ITV Sport Channel continued to broadcast, and was re-designated as a free-to-air channel. The closure of the channel was announced two days later, and closed as planned on 11 May, after its coverage of the Division 2 play-off final between Brentford and Stoke. Following the end of the match, a closedown slide was displayed stating "The ITV Sport Channel has ceased transmission".

On 1 August 2002 the Football League sued ITV Digital's parent companies, Carlton and Granada, claiming that the firms had breached their contract in failing to deliver the guaranteed income. The League lost the case, with the judge ruling that it had "failed to extract sufficient written guarantees". The League then filed a negligence claim against its lawyers for failing to press for a written guarantee at the time of the deal with ITV Digital. This time it was awarded a paltry £4 in damages of the £150m it was seeking.

== Programming ==
Throughout its time on air, football was the mainstay of the channel. In addition to live Football League coverage, the channel showed Saturday night primetime highlights from all three divisions. The UEFA Champions League coverage previously shown on ONsport moved to ITV Sport Channel to help to fill out the channel's schedule. However, other sports did receive some coverage, including the tennis coverage previously shown on OnSport 1, snooker, the British Basketball League and boxing from the United States. The channel also acquired secondary rights to European Cup rugby union.

== Successor ==
In 2017, ITV would launch another sport channel, ITV Box Office, showing pay-per-view boxing and wrestling events; that service shut down in early 2020.
