= Carlton Kids =

Former British television channel

Ownership
- Owner: Carlton Television, a subdivision of Carlton Communications plc
- Sister channels: Carlton World; Carlton Select; Carlton Food Network; Carlton Cinema

History
- Launched: 15 November 1998; 27 years ago
- Closed: 31 January 2000; 26 years ago
- Replaced by: Discovery Kids

Availability (At time of closure)

Terrestrial
- ONdigital: Channel 34

Carlton Kids was a British digital terrestrial pay television kids channel, provided by Carlton Television, which started broadcasting on 15 November 1998 and closed on 31 January 2000. Its sister channels were Carlton Food Network, Carlton World, Carlton Cinema and Carlton Select. It broadcast exclusively on ONdigital, the digital terrestrial pay-TV platform backed by Carlton and Granada, where it timeshared on channel 34 with Carlton World.

The channel had limited coverage, reaching only 69% of the population via the lowest-powered terrestrial multiplex D, and newspapers and listings magazines were slow to feature the channel's programming. In the face of competition from several other dedicated children's channels in the UK market the channel ceased broadcasting at the end of January 2000 after 14 months, (1 year, 2 months) partly due to the limited uptake of the ONdigital platform, which was the only platform that the channel had carriage. Initially it was expected to be replaced by an ITV Kids channel, which was planned in mid-1999 to counter the rise of UKTV, but, after a new deal signed by ONdigital with Discovery Communications, it was replaced by Discovery Kids. The other Carlton channels closed over the next few years.

Carlton Television later merged with Granada in 2004 to form ITV plc, which went on to launch another children's channel CITV, in 2006.

== Programming ==
The channel showcased children's programming from Carlton and other ITV franchisees including Granada Television, Central Television, and Yorkshire Television, short films from the BBC library, as well as programmes acquired from American and overseas distributors. Shows included Mopatop's Shop, The Raggy Dolls, Puppydog Tales (originally shown in 1992 on the BBC), Rosie and Jim, Tots TV, The Berenstain Bears, Tickle on the Tum, Willo the Wisp, The Legends of Treasure Island and Worzel Gummidge.

Presentation was provided by daily wrap-around shows "Wakey Wakey" and "The Max". Both were recorded at Ealing Studios. "Wakey Wakey" was presented by Chuck Thomas and Naomi Wilkinson. The Max was presented by Angellica Bell and Paul Leyshon. Other presenters included Jamie Rickers and Alex Verrey.

== List of (known) programs ==
=== Wrap-Around ===
- The Max
- Tiny Time
- Wakey Wakey
- RAW TV

=== Drama ===
- Byker Grove (Also shown on Carlton Select)
- Harry's Mad
- Woof!

=== Fantasy ===
- The Worst Witch

=== Animated ===
- The Adventures of Sir Prancelot
- Around the World in Eighty Days (1972 series)
- The Berenstain Bears (1985 series)
- Bod
- Bolek and Lolek (as Jym and Jam)
- Car-Toon Time with Little Brrrrm
- Denver, the Last Dinosaur
- The Dreamstone
- Doris
- Goodtimes Family Classics
- Henry's Cat
- Ketchup: Cats Who Cook
- The Legends of Treasure Island
- Molly's Gang
- Noah and Nelly in... SkylArk
- Rosie & Ruff in Puppydog Tales
- The Raggy Dolls
- Rubbish, King of the Jumble
- Willo the Wisp

=== Education ===
- Alphabet Castle
- Tickle on the Tum

=== Food ===
- Food Factory (Also shown on Carlton Food Network)
- Planet Nosh (Also shown on Carlton Food Network)
- School Dinners (Also shown on Carlton Food Network)

=== Comedy ===
- The Big Comfy Couch
- Worzel Gummidge

=== Puppet ===
- Mopatop's Shop
- Rosie & Jim
- Tots TV

=== Sports ===
- High Five

== Closure ==
Carlton Kids was the first of five Carlton Communications channels to shut down, doing so on 31 January 2000. The channel had no mention of its closure, and after airing its final program aired a few advertisements and a promo of Discovery Kids coming to the UK, which would foreshadow Discovery Kids replacing Carlton Kids.
