= ITV Encore =

- Logo used from 2014 to 2018
- Country: United Kingdom
- Broadcast area: United Kingdom
- Headquarters: London

Programming
- Language: English
- Picture format: 16:9 576i (SDTV); 1080i (HDTV)
- Timeshift service: ITV Encore +1

Ownership
- Owner: ITV Digital Channels Ltd (ITV plc)
- Sister channels: ITV1; ITV2; ITV3; ITV4; ITVBe; ITV Box Office; CITV

History
- Launched: 9 June 2014
- Closed: 1 May 2018 (3 years, 10 months and 22 days)
- Replaced by: Online service (Sky Go/Now TV)

Availability (at time of closure)

Streaming media
- Sky Go: Watch live (UK only)
- Now TV: Watch live (UK only)

ITV Encore was a British drama pay television channel in the United Kingdom that was owned by ITV Digital Channels Ltd, a division of ITV plc. The channel was exclusive to Sky's digital satellite platform, Sky Go, Now TV, and Sky Store.

The channel closed on 1 May 2018, becoming an on-demand only service available on other platforms as well as Sky.

== History ==
=== Launch ===
ITV Encore launched at 7pm on 9 June 2014. The first programme to be shown on the channel was an episode of Agatha Christie's Poirot which was also the final programme.

The channel was ITV's first new channel launch in over eight years, and formed part of a wider four-year partnership with Sky – ITV's largest ever with a platform operator. It was also the first ITV-branded subscription channel since ITV Sport Channel closed down in 2002.

=== ITV Encore +1 ===
A one-hour timeshifted mirror of ITV Encore launched alongside the parent channel, broadcast on Sky channel 193 (a channel slot ITV had acquired from the Information TV group). ITV Encore +1 temporarily closed on 1 October 2014 (ITV3 +1 took its old slot), to make space for ITVBe, which launched on channel 179. ITV Encore +1 was re-added to the channel lineup on 15 December 2014 on channel 208, the same day ITVBe +1 was added to the Sky and Freesat platforms. It moved to channel 268 on 1 August 2017, a slot previously taken by ITV4 HD, as part of a reshuffling which included ITVBe moving to channel 149, a slot they had acquired from AMC Networks International Zone.

=== ITV Encore HD ===
A high-definition service also launched on Sky channel 298, on the same day as ITV Encore. It broadcasts ITV dramas in high-definition. ITV Encore HD moved to Sky channel 263 on 19 August 2014, following more spaces in the Entertainment genre to be added, and the Lifestyle genre being shortened. On 15 December 2014, it moved again to Sky channel 269, to make space for ITVBe +1 and ITV Encore +1 (as ITV3 HD took its old place). It moved back to channel 263 on 1 August 2017, with CBS Drama taking its old place.

== Closure ==
It was confirmed by an ITV spokesperson in November 2017 that the linear television service ITV Encore would close in Spring 2018.

ITV Encore closed at midnight on 1 May 2018 as part of Sky's major EPG reshuffle. The last programme shown on the channel was Agatha Christie's Poirot The Plymouth Express. Its Sky EPG slot was taken by Sky Two.

== Former programming ==
ITV Encore broadcast some of ITV's most successful drama series of recent years. Since January 2015, ITV Encore also showed original drama, commissioned for the channel. This move was to attract new viewers to the channel, and to the Sky TV platform.

=== First-run ===
- Jordskott (2015–2018)
- The Americans (2015–2018; shown on ITV from 2013–2014)
- Ängelby (2016–2018)

=== Original commissions ===
- The Frankenstein Chronicles (2015–2018)
- Harlots (2017–2018)
- Houdini & Doyle (2016)

=== Other shows ===
- Always And Everyone
- Agatha Christie's Poirot
- Brief Encounters
- Heartbeat
- Peak Practice
- The Chief
- The Ruth Rendell Mysteries
- Vera
