= Carlton Television =

ITV weekday service for London

- The Carlton region when it lost its identity in 2002
- Type: Region of television network
- Branding: Carlton
- Country: England
- First air date: 1 January 1993; 33 years ago
- Motto: Television For London
- TV transmitters: Crystal Palace
- Headquarters: 101 St Martin's Lane, London
- Broadcast area: London and parts of the South East
- Owner: Carlton Communications
- Dissolved: Lost on-air identity on 25 October 2002; 24 years ago (after 9 years, 297 days, now known as ITV at all times)
- Picture format: 16:9 576i (1998-2002); 4:3 576i (1993-2002)
- Affiliation: ITV
- Official website: www.itv.com/london
- Language: English
- Replaced: Thames Television
- Replaced by: ITV London

Carlton Television (now part of the non-franchised ITV London region) was the ITV franchise holder for London and the surrounding counties from 9.25am every Monday to 5.15pm every Friday. The franchises formerly operated by Carlton and London Weekend Television are now managed as a single entity (ITV London), but the two services are still separately licensed. The service is owned and operated by ITV plc under the licensee of "ITV Broadcasting Limited". Carlton has been branded on air as "ITV1" since 28 October 2002 ("ITV" between 14 January 2013 and 14 November 2022).

Carlton Television Ltd, the original holder of the licence (renamed Carlton Broadcasting Limited on 1 February 1997), has since been dissolved. Carlton UK Television Limited however is now known as ITV Consumer Limited and legally operates ITV plc's websites. As Carlton's name has no relation to its region, its on-screen identity has been completely removed (along with those of HTV, LWT and GMTV). Other regions have kept their original company name as a region name and in their local news name.

== Formation ==
Carlton Television was originally set up by Michael Green's Carlton Communications to bid for an ITV franchise after Green failed to buy into Thames Television, the London franchise, in 1985. On 16 October 1991, Carlton won the "Channel 3" franchise to broadcast to London during weekdays from January 1993, as a result of winning the silent auction used to renegotiate the new ITV franchises. Thames bid £32.5M, while Carlton Television placed a bid of £43.2M and CPV-TV placed a bid of £45.3M. CPV-TV was the highest bidder, but was eliminated for failing the quality threshold; since both Thames and Carlton were deemed to have passed the quality threshold, the franchise was awarded to Carlton for having submitted the higher cash bid of the remaining two companies. Carlton also bid for the South and South East franchise, losing to Meridian Broadcasting. Some commentators consequently speculated that Thames had fallen victim to a "government vendetta", whilst others felt that the auction had been won fairly.

Carlton did not buy Thames' studios, instead having its headquarters in St Martin's Lane in the West End and opting to rent transmission space at LWT's London studios. Also, unlike Thames which had been both a production company and a broadcaster, Carlton chose to commission all of its programming from independent production companies.

On 30 November 1992, it unveiled its launch slate of programmes, costing £45 million, featuring the period drama Head Over Heels, set in the 1950s, the thriller miniseries A Statement of Affairs, and Body and Soul, about a "young nun in crisis". Factual programming at launch consisted of a documentary on Vietnam, This Week replacement Storyline and The Good Sex Guide, described as "adult sex education".

=== Launch ===
Carlton Television took over from Thames at stroke of midnight on New Year's Day (1 January) 1993, broadcasting from a newly opened playout centre managed by London News Network, a subsidiary company co-owned by Carlton and London Weekend Television from LWT's facilities on the South Bank in London.

At the stroke of midnight, following ITN's Into The New Year bulletin featuring the Westminster clock tower chimes, technicians at the Crystal Palace transmitter switched from Thames' Euston Road headquarters to the LNN playout centre from where Carlton went on-air with an opening ident featuring Maurice Jones, the then-town crier of London, with the slogan of Carlton, "This is Carlton. Television for London", ringing the bell three times, and the first announcement from continuity announcer Graham Bannerman. He started the first continuity announcement for Carlton with these words: "And a very Happy new year. Welcome to 1993, and our first programme live from Trafalgar Square, here's Chris Tarrant with A Carlton New Year." The station's first programme was the entertainment special A Carlton New Year, produced in-house and presented by Chris Tarrant. After the special, the movie Best Defense, which starred Dudley Moore and Eddie Murphy, aired, which began after Carlton's second ident, with the sea cadets of the Royal Navy, saying the slogan, was shown. Idents from January to December 1993 had the slogan: "This is Carlton. Television for London.", "This is Carlton" or "You're watching Carlton."

Unlike Thames, which had been both a broadcaster and a production company, Carlton chose to commission most of its programming from independent production companies although its contract to hold the ITV franchise licence disallowed the company to commission all programming so Carlton still had to produce a minimal amount of programming in-house.

The first Carlton-produced programme to be broadcast nationally was Surprise Party, effectively the same format as This Is Your Life, previously a mainstay of predecessor Thames Television. Hosted by Michael Parkinson, the first celebrity to be the subject of the show was entrepreneur Richard Branson. At the end of the hour-long show, Michael Parkinson told viewers to keep their eyes out for another Surprise Party. However, no further programmes were ever made.

Alarm bells had been ringing before Carlton even transmitted as part of the ITV network, as one notable commission with wide publicity was The Good Sex Guide, inviting scorn and derision from conservative newspapers, before it had actually been broadcast. Aptly, its first commercial break featured an advert for the Vauxhall Carlton.

== Broadcasting ==
In May 1994, the Independent Television Commission criticised a number of ITV stations as part of its review for the first 12 months of the new franchise in 1993. Carlton Television was condemned for providing a wide range of 'unimpressive and very disappointing' programmes for the ITV network, which were 'neither distinctive nor noticeable high quality'. This criticism came after Carlton and Granada secretly planned to axe News at Ten in the chase for ratings, a move which was foiled by the ITC. Carlton, angered by this criticism, responded: 'In the first year, Carlton launched 43 brand new series and 20 new single programmes, sustained audience levels and played a full part in ITV network; successes far outweighed failures.' A few days later, Carlton won two awards from the Royal Television Society's 'programme and tech awards' in London; Margi Clarke was named 'Best Female Presenter' for Carlton's The Good Sex Guide; while Old Bear Stories won the Children's Entertainment award.

During a 1994 review, ITC commented that Carlton had made improvements, in its factual and drama output, while its children's programmes were 'impressive', but more remained to be achieved. In 1995, its regional programming was regarded as high quality but with few innovations; The Good Sex Guide was guilty of breaching taste and decency requirements with little educational classifications, which resulted in the company receiving two written warnings from the ITC. Once again, in 1997, Carlton was criticised for failing to ensure its programming complied with the programmes code, while the number of formal interventions from the ITC had increased from four in 1995 to eight; but its regional programming continued to be of high quality.

=== Factual inaccuracy in 1996 documentary ===
Carlton found itself at the centre of a major controversy about truthfulness in broadcast journalism in May 1998, when The Guardian carried a series of articles alleging the wholesale fabrication of a much-garlanded 1996 documentary, The Connection, which had purported to film the route by which heroin was smuggled into the United Kingdom from Colombia. An internal inquiry at Carlton found that the allegations made by The Guardian were in large part correct, and the then-regulator of the industry, the ITC, punished Carlton with a record fine of £2 million for multiple breaches of the UK's broadcasting codes. The scandal led to an impassioned debate about the accuracy of documentary production.

=== Expansion ===
Changes in legislation concerning media ownership enabled Carlton to buy out many of the other ITV stations, including Central Independent Television, Westcountry, and part of HTV (via Granada), as well as the rights to the archives of ITC Entertainment and its former sister company ATV. Rank Film Distributors, including its library of 740 films, was purchased by Carlton in 1997 for £65 million. HTV was the only region owned by Carlton not to be subject to a full on-screen rebrand as 'Carlton'. Both 'HTV West' and 'HTV Wales' stayed with their then-current idents; however, upon Carlton's purchase, the animated introduction and music to the idents were replaced by the sequences and audio in use with Carlton's graphical package. However, the logo and end-board of the ident remained unchanged, using the generic hearts look of 1999. Carlton also did not acquire most of HTV's production facilities; these were retained by Granada.

The ITC archive is financially lucrative, since it includes such popular series as Thunderbirds, The Prisoner, and The Saint, as well as such feature films as On Golden Pond. Carlton released much of the Rank library on video and DVD via its own label in the UK, and via A & E Home Video, Acorn Media, MGM Home Entertainment, and Lions Gate Home Entertainment in the USA. A large number of these films were screened on Carlton's digital movie channel, Carlton Cinema; however, it closed in March 2003. The merger with Granada led to the use of the Carlton name falling into disuse, and Carlton Video became part of Granada Ventures.

=== ITV Digital ===
In 1997, Carlton formed a partnership with Granada and BSkyB to bid for some of the multiplexes for the new digital terrestrial network. In June of that year, it was successful in its application, and began the service, OnDigital, under the condition BSkyB withdrew from the group. OnDigital was rebranded as ITV Digital in 2001, before its collapse in 2002.

== Merger and unification ==
In September 2002, Carlton and Granada, having now acquired all the franchises in England and Wales, made the decision to remove all regional idents, continuity and branding, and replace them with the single brand, ITV1. English regional idents were to only precede regional programming, and regional announcements were pre-recorded from London (Wales gets on-screen recognition prior to all programming, see ITV1 Wales). Unlike Granada-owned regions, Carlton used dual-branding on its regional idents with the Carlton logo, so the Carlton Westcountry and Carlton Central regions were simply known as ITV1 Carlton. Granada-owned franchises preferred simply to place text of the region name under the ITV1 logo. This went on until December 2003, when Carlton dropped the practice, resulting in changing the brands from Carlton Central to ITV1 for Central England, from Carlton Westcountry to ITV1 for the Westcountry. The HTV regions were re-branded ITV1 Wales and ITV1 West of England in 2002.

On 2 February 2004, Carlton Communications plc merged with Granada plc, creating ITV plc, which now owns all of the ITV franchises in England and Wales under the ITV1 brand (Wales still uses its own on-screen identity as ITV1 Wales, but now also uses English ITV1 continuity since 16 January 2006). The three English Carlton ITV regions were reverted to their previous names: ITV1 for Central England again became ITV1 Central, ITV1 West of England became ITV1 West and ITV1 for the Westcountry became ITV1 Westcountry, prior to regional programming in their respective areas.

=== ITV London ===
Since 28 October 2002, the London weekday franchise (in common with all the other ITV companies, except Scottish Television, Grampian Television, Ulster Television and Channel Television) has been known on air simply as ITV1. Unlike London Weekend Television, Carlton Television did not note the last day (25 October) of its regional identity on-air. However, the Carlton brand continued to be seen on production captions until 2004. Since the two London franchises now use identical presentation and logos, the division between the London weekday and weekend franchises is now invisible, although the weekend licence does have London Weekend Weather, which is sponsored by a different company to that of London weekdays.

With the merger of Carlton and Granada, ITV London has a single management team. The separate licences are now just a formality.

Upon merger, Carlton lost recognition to programmes made by their companies, which became branded as Granada and the relevant area, for example, all programmes made in London became branded as Granada London. From 16 January 2006, all programmes produced by any ITV plc owned region were branded as ITV Productions and in 2009 this became ITV Studios.

== Studios ==
Carlton was a publisher broadcaster who never made any of its own programming itself. Carlton productions that required studio space were booked at Lenton Lane when Carlton bought Central Independent Television in 1994, obtaining the company's Nottingham studios and gained the in-house production arm. The studios were booked by independent production companies.

Carlton was originally based in a small office building in St. Martin's Lane in Central London, with transmission being provided by London News Network, a company jointly owned with LWT and based at The London Studios that also provided a seven-day news service.

Following the creation of ITV plc in 2004, Carlton's office in St Martin's Lane was vacated and the operations transferred to The London Studios, albeit as part of the ITV plc operations housed there. ITV London's news operation moved to ITN on 1 March 2004. The transmission operation moved to the HD Technicolor Playout Centre at Chiswick.

== Identity ==
=== Launch ident ===
Carlton's on-screen identity was launched on 1 January 1993 with an ident package featuring London personalities. These people, who lived and worked in the capital would appear against a brightly coloured background with the Carlton logo in the top left corner, and would say the phrase, "This is Carlton, television for London", or other variations of the theme. In excess of sixty idents were produced and used from 1993. This was replaced by a single montage of individuals used from later on from 6 December 1993 until 1 September 1995.

=== 1995 ===
On 4 September 1995, a new in-house look was launched featuring changing backgrounds of colours with a translucent Carlton logo in the centre of the screen, becoming opaque and white at the end of the ident. These idents lasted until 22 November 1996, but were deemed not exciting or brash enough for Carlton executives.

=== 1996 ===
Lambie-Nairn devised the new set on 25 November 1996, featuring the Carlton logo against a brightly coloured background and various animations occurring. This could be interaction between other letters in the name, letters being replaced by objects, or the letters becoming part of something larger, such as a crossword of places in London. Thirty sequences were produced, including some designed especially to introduce certain programmes, and versions for Central were also introduced two years later on 27 April 1998. These idents were used until 3 September 1999.

=== 1999 ===
On 6 September 1999, Carlton's boldest rebrand yet occurred, and it was also to be its last. While Granada and UNM regions were about to adopt the "Hearts" generic look, Carlton refused the look and instead adopted a package that related back to the Hearts, but put their own distinct take on it. Lambie-Nairn was once again commissioned, and a dozen idents were produced and were used depending on the programme to go before it. The idents featured opening films featuring a heart shape, before a star shaped light is emitted from the heart shape, before the screen changes to the Carlton logo, now with added star in top right corner, against a spinning stars background of different colours, with ITV logo beneath. This look has received criticism, not concerning the idents themselves, but because these idents replaced the brands used by both Central and Westcountry. The idents were later partially adopted by HTV following its sale to Carlton, with the opening films from said look, although with the HTV logo and ITV Hearts ending slide being retained.

=== Continuity announcers ===
Carlton used a number of continuity announcers throughout the years.

(1993)

- Graham Bannerman (1993–2002)
- Fiona Goldman (1993–2002)
- Mark Lipscomb (1993–2002) (only Thames continuity announcer to work for its successor franchisee)
- Adrian Finighan (1993)

(1994)

- Hilary Holden (1994–1997)

(1995)

- David Allan (1995–2002)

(2000)

- Erica Longdon (2000–2002)
- John McKenzie (2000–2002) (previously at Granada)
- Peter Tompkins (2000–2002)

== Productions ==
=== Network ===
Some notable Carlton commissions are listed below:

(1992)

- Bananas in Pyjamas (1992)

(1993)

- Brighton Belles (1993–94)
- Frank Stubbs Promotes (1993–94)
- The Good Sex Guide (1993–94)
- Alphabet Castle (1993–95)
- The Beat (1993–95)
- Michael Ball (1993–95)
- The Little Picture Show (1993–95)
- The Chrystal Rose Show (1993–96)
- The Hypnotic World of Paul McKenna (1993–97)
- Old Bear Stories (1993–97)
- The Big Story (1993–97)
- Blues and Twos (1993–98)
- Schofield's TV Gold (1993–98)
- Tots TV (1993–98, previously networked by Central until 1996)
- Mike and Angelo (1993–2000, previously produced by Thames Television from 1989 to 1991)
- Body and Soul (1993)
- Dave Allen (1993)
- Head over Heels (1993)
- Lose a Million (1993)
- A Statement of Affairs (1993)
- A Woman's Guide to Adultery (1993)
- Storyline (1993)
- Sport in Question (1993 regional only, 1994–96 networked)

(1994)

- 99-1 (1994–95)
- Class Act (1994–95)
- Moving Story (1994–95)
- Scavengers (1994–95)
- Terror Towers (1994–96)
- The 10%ers (1994–96)
- Dr. Zitbag's Transylvania Pet Shop (1994–97)
- Talking Telephone Numbers (1994–97)
- Catchphrase (1994–2002; previously produced by TVS/Meridian between 1986 and 1993)
- Police Camera Action! (1994–2002)

(1995)

- Good Sex Guide Abroad (1995–96)
- Is It Legal? (1995–96; the series moved to Channel 4 in 1998, though still produced by Hartswood Films)
- Sharman (1995–96)
- Cone Zone (1995–97)
- Bramwell (1995–98)
- The Clive James Show (1995–98)

(1996)

- Element of Doubt (1996)
- Frontiers (1996)
- Gayle's World (1996–97)
- Bodyguards (1996–97)
- Crazy Cottage (1996–98)
- Quisine (1996–98)
- Wilderness (1996)
- The Treasure Seekers (1996)

(1997)

- Loved by You (1997–98)
- Noah's Ark (1997–98)
- Snap (1997–99)
- Into The Blue (1997)
- Rebecca (1997)

(1998)

- Babes in the Wood (1998–99)
- Timbuctoo (1998–99)
- Mad for It (1998–2000)
- Whizziwig (1998–2000)
- Cider with Rosie (1998)
- Frenchman's Creek (1998)
- Goodnight Mister Tom (1998)
- Heat of the Sun (1998)
- The Unknown Soldier (1998)
- Who Wants to Be a Millionaire? (1998, co-produced with Celador)

(1999)

- Bad Blood (1999)
- Pump It Up (1999–2000)
- Family Fortunes (1999–2002)
- Mopatop's Shop (1999–2003, co-produced with the Jim Henson Company)
- The Vice (1999–2003)

(2000)

- The Unforgettable (2000–02)
- TV's Naughtiest Blunders (2000–2005)
- Monsignor Renard (2000)
- Grizzly Tales for Gruesome Kids (2000–06)
- The Railway Children (2000)

(2001)

- Starstreet (2001–02)
- Lloyd & Hill (2001)
- Anybody's Nightmare (2001)

(2002)

- The Vault (2002–04)
- Dead Gorgeous (2002)
- Bertie and Elizabeth (2002)

(2003)

- Fortysomething (2003)
- Pollyanna (2003)
- Too Good to Be True (2003)

(2004)

- The Brief (2004–05)
- Murder in Suburbia (2004–05)

=== Regional ===
(1993)

- One in 5 Million (1993–95)
- Big City (1993–95)
- Capital Woman (1993–97)
- Carlton Sport (1993–2004)
- Going Underground (1993)
- The Frost Programme (1993)

(1994)

- Carlton People (1994–99)
- Capital Futures (1994)
- Who Cares Wins (1994)

(1995)

- Revelations (1995–96; a co-production with Central and Granada Television)
- Capital Lives (1995)

(1996)

- London Bridge (1996–99)
- Crown And Country (1996–2000)
- Carlton Debate (1996–2002)
- Carlton Country (1996–2003)

(1997)

- First Edition (1997–2004)

(1998)

- The Sports Show (1998–2000)

(2003)

- The Tube (2003–05)

For other details about local news and non-news programmes for London, see London News Network.

== Other ventures ==
Between 1996 and 2003, Carlton owned a number of extra channels, carried initially on analogue cable, and also later on their flagship platform, ONdigital too, although none of them ever made it onto Sky Digital. Three closed in 2000; and all five were closed by 2003. Most were closed due to funding issues and lack of loyal viewership. They all time-shared on three EPG positions. Carlton Food Network and Carlton Select shared a channel, Carlton Kids, Carlton World, and another channel named 'RAW!' shared the second. Carlton Cinema received an EPG position of its own, but would be periodically closed down to provide bandwidth for "On Sport 2" during the ONdigital days.

=== Carlton Cinema ===
Carlton Cinema was the Carlton channel which showed classic movies, but also unusually for a movie channel, cartoons. This ceased transmission on 31 March 2003, the last of the five Carlton channels to do so.

=== Carlton Select ===
Carlton Select was the main entertainment channel from Carlton, and broadcast both in the UK and Africa. It time-shared with the Carlton Food Network, and ceased transmission in March 2000.

=== Carlton World ===
Carlton World was a general entertainment and factual channel broadcast in the evenings, with sister channel Carlton Kids broadcast in the daytime. This ceased transmission in February 2000.

=== Carlton Kids ===
Carlton Kids was a children's channel and showed almost all of Carlton's children's imports, and programming from Carlton's regions. Time-shared with Carlton World, it ceased transmission in January 2000.

=== Carlton Food Network ===
Carlton Food Network was the Carlton channel devoted to cookery, and time-shared with Carlton Select. It was later rebranded "Taste CFN", and ceased transmission in December 2001.

ITV regional service
Preceded by Thames Television	London (weekdays); 1 January 1993 – 25 October 2002	Succeeded by ITV London
