= Men & Motors =

Programming
- Picture format: 576i (16:9 SDTV)

Ownership
- Owner: ITV plc
- Parent: ITV Digital Channels Ltd
- Sister channels: ITV1; ITV2; ITV3; ITV4

History
- Launched: 1 October 1996
- Closed: 1 April 2010 (13 years and 6 months)
- Replaced by: ITV1 HD (on Freesat & Sky)
- Former names: Granada Men & Motors (1996–2001)

Links
- Website: menandmotors.com

Men & Motors was a men's lifestyle television channel in the UK. It was the last remaining station operated by the former Granada Sky Broadcasting joint venture, set up by Granada Television (now part of ITV plc) and satellite broadcaster British Sky Broadcasting in 1996. Men & Motors closed on 1 April 2010.

In February 2021, One Media iP relaunched a Men & Motors channel via Kapang, a television app, fronted by Shane Lynch and Torie Campbell.

== History ==
=== Launch ===
First Men & Motors logo, used from 1 October 1996 to 31 August 1998.

The channel's provisional name at the time of GSkyB's creation in December 1995 was Granada Men & Motoring.

From its launch, Men & Motors was only available with subscription television services and for its first two-year on air, it shared space with Granada Plus and was on air each night from 11pm until 2am.

It was part of the original line-up (as a "primary channel") for ITV Digital, a Digital terrestrial television service part-owned by Granada. This saw its broadcast hours expand and it came on air at the earlier time of 9pm, with motors content before 11 pm, and adult content thereafter.

When ONdigital closed, Men & Motors left DTT, and was then available only via satellite and cable.

=== Presenters ===
Second Men & Motors logo, used from 1 September 1998 to 11 August 2001.

Famous names who started at Men & Motors are split into two groups. On the more mature 'Men' side of the channel, presenters included Jordan (Katie Price), Jo Guest, Catherine McQueen, Mike Reid, Roy "Chubby" Brown, Garry Bushell and James Whale.

On the 'Motors' side names included Gary Numan, Vanilla Ice, Ginny Buckley, Richard Hammond, John Inverdale, Foo Foo Lammar (in a section titled Hot Agony Aunt) and Princess Tamara. The channel initially saw some growth, and Men and Motors became a minor household name until November 2004, when ITV acquired GSkyB and rebranded the ill-fated Plus as ITV3.

=== Switch to free-to-air ===
Many years after the closure of ITV Digital, ITV (the company formed by the merger of Carlton Television and Granada) successfully bid for a slot on digital terrestrial (DTT) multiplex D. It was announced that Men & Motors would be launched on Freeview on 2 May 2005. To coincide with this launch, the channel was re-vamped, and its late night, risqué adult content was replaced by archive drama, comedy and documentaries. The channel also dropped its Videoguard encryption on Sky Digital on 1 July 2005, switching to free-to-air status.

ITV's plans to launch a channel aimed at men (the target audience of Men & Motors) were considered by many to be the end for Men & Motors. It seemed logical that Men & Motors would simply "become" ITV4, with much of the channel's programming simply being shown under the ITV brand; in addition to inheriting its programming, it would also axe its popular softcore block. With capacity on the Freeview platform limited, and to avoid being in competition for the same genre of viewers, this seemed the inevitable conclusion.

However, available to a much wider audience, Men & Motors enjoyed a (slightly unexpected) sharp increase in viewing figures. ITV were faced with the conundrum of replacing a channel with a well-known brand and enjoying a new popularity with a new, seemingly identical channel. ITV4 instead replaced the ITV News Channel on Freeview (between its broadcasting hours of 18:00 to 06:00), with Men & Motors still available on its own 24-hour slot. The News channel closed soon after, due to major competition from Sky News and BBC News 24 and heavy financial losses. It was replaced fully by ITV4 and the CITV Channel.

Men & Motors closedown slide on Freeview. This briefly reappeared in 2008 during a breakdown on ITV4.

After less than a year on Freeview, Men & Motors had now been replaced. At 06:00 BST on 12 April 2006, Men & Motors ceased transmissions on digital terrestrial television. This was to allow ITV to launch the "participation television" channel, ITV Play, which has since been closed down itself. With limited bandwidth on the platform, and a desire to keep the entire ITV "family" (i.e. all channels carrying the ITV brand) on the free platform, Men & Motors was only available on satellite and cable television at the time of its closure.

A possible merger with ITV4 had been on the cards, but in September 2007 ITV confirmed that it planned to dispose of Men & Motors.

=== Closure ===
On 2 April 2010, ITV1 HD launched on Sky Digital channel 178, replacing Men & Motors. As a result, Men & Motors closed on 1 April at 6 a.m. on both Freesat and Sky Digital. On Virgin Media, Men & Motors was removed from the EPG on 25 March 2010 for "operational reasons" to add an ITV HD launch information screen. Most of the programmes that were shown on Men & Motors moved over to ITV4.

== Assets purchase by One Media iP (2012–present) ==
On 11 December 2012, One Media iP announced that they had acquired all of the trademarks and content rights of Men & Motors from ITV plc, including approximately 1,600 hours of programming. One Media are currently repackaging the content for sale across a variety of digital platforms including the iTunes Store and YouTube. The original Men & Motors footage including full episodes and clips are available to watch on the Official Men & Motors YouTube channel. The company said that in 2020 the YouTube channel received 2.5 million viewing minutes per week.

One Media iP relaunched Men & Motors as an online channel in February 2021 with new and archived shows.
