= Wellbeing (TV channel) =

British television channel

Wellbeing (TV)
- Country: United Kingdom

Ownership
- Owner: Granada TV and Boots Pharmacy

History
- Launched: 14 March 2001
- Closed: 31 December 2001
- Replaced by: ITV Select (ITV Digital only)

Links
- Website: Wellbeing Official Site (Archive)

Wellbeing was a short lived British well-being and lifestyle channel broadcast under the joint venture of Granada TV and the Boots Pharmacy chain. The channel was launched on 14 March 2001 and closed on 31 December 2001 after nine months on air. It was replaced by ITV Select, on ITV Digital, on 26 January 2002 before the collapse of the ITV broadcasting service in October 2002 s.
