= Carlton Food Network =

British television channel

- Taste CFN logo, used from May until December 2001

Ownership
- Owner: Carlton Television (Carlton Communications)
- Sister channels: Carlton Select; Carlton Cinema; Carlton Kids; Carlton World

History
- Launched: 2 September 1996; 30 years ago
- Closed: 30 November 2001; 24 years ago

Availability (at time of closure)

Terrestrial
- ITV Digital: Channel 35

Carlton Food Network (later known as Taste CFN from May 2001) was a British pay television digital terrestrial channel, owned by Carlton Television. It launched at midday on 2 September 1996 and closed on 30 November 2001. It was part of a group of non-terrestrial channels operated by Carlton, which also included Carlton Select – with whom Carlton Food Network time-shared space with – Carlton World, Carlton Kids, and Carlton Cinema.

The channel was also available via the PanAmSat's PAS-4 satellite in Europe, the Middle East and Africa on the South African DStv service.

== History ==
Carlton Food Network launched on Monday, 2 September 1996 on cable. It originally broadcast on weekday afternoons, from 12 noon until 5pm, but later it expanded its broadcasting hours to become a seven-day-a-week, all-day service, broadcasting daily from 9am until 5pm. Carlton Food Network shared space with Carlton Select. It began broadcasting on the ONdigital (later ITV Digital) platform at its launch in November 1998, which was part owned by Carlton along with another ITV company Granada, who also operated its own group of Granada branded channels under a partnership with Sky known as Granada Sky Broadcasting. In early 2000, Carlton Select was closed down and its hours on ONdigital were given over to Carlton Food Network resulting in CFN becoming a full-time channel. However the channel remained a daytime only service on cable with Carlton Cinema airing during the evenings in place of Carlton Select.

=== The Taste era ===
In September 2000, Carlton announced it had a signed a joint venture with the supermarket chain Sainsbury's to co-brand the channel. The deal saw the announcement of interactive services for digital TV viewers that would allow them to order recipe ingredients from Sainsbury's through their set-top box. The rebranding took place the following May, with the channel becoming Taste CFN and the launch of the taste.co.uk website, merging Carlton's SimplyFood and Sainsbury's tasteforlife websites. The channel was now promoted by Sainsbury's both in-store and on its website.

However, the partnership was brief, and it was announced in August 2001 that the venture was to be disbanded on 1 September. Less than expected revenues from e-commerce and a weakened advertising market were blamed on the decision to close the venture, which saw the return of ownership of the Taste CFN channel back to Carlton and the return of the web-based recipe and wine assets to Sainsbury's, with the taste.co.uk website being shut down and its assets being reused by Sainsbury's own websites.

Although Carlton returned ownership of Taste CFN as part of the venture disbanding, Carlton decided to close the channel and it ceased broadcasting on 30 November. The final day of transmission for the channel was full of never-before-seen programming. At 23:58, Taste CFN aired a farewell montage of clips from the programming aired all throughout its five years of operation, followed by a final airing of its ident, with a closing announcement:

Well that's all from Taste CFN, not just for today but sadly forever. The last five years have really been very enjoyable ones for us, and we hope you got as much pleasure out of the programmes as we did out of bringing them to you. So before we disappear, a big thank you to all of you who've watched us over the years, it was great while it lasted. Goodbye from all of us here on Taste CFN, but standby for Carlton Cinema.

Afterward, before a final fade-out and showing Carlton Cinema on-screen, this caption appeared on-screen:

To all our loyal viewers who watched the channel over the years
Thank You and Goodbye

On ITV Digital, it was anticipated that the slot was to be filled by a new channel on the now struggling platform, but in the end, the space became a preview channel for ITV Digital suppliers and potential customers.

The channel also shut down in Africa, where it was carried on the DStv platform.

=== Post closure ===
Less than a month before the closure of the channel, a new food and cookery channel from the UKTV network began broadcasting, UK Food, a spin-off channel from UK Style. Later known as the Good Food Channel before closedown, the channel was known to broadcast former CFN programming, including original programming that was made for CFN such as Use Your Loaf, co-hosted by James Martin and Paul Hollywood. Good Food closed on 11 September 2019 due to Discovery taking control of the channel and deciding to merge it with the Food Network.

=== Programming ===
The channel broadcast food and cookery programmes and showcased the best of Carlton and other ITV cookery programmes. It also broadcast a weekday food magazine show called Food Network Daily, which was shown several times each day.

== See also ==
- Carlton Television
