= ITV Digital =

Former British subscription-based digital terrestrial TV service

ITV Digital plc
- Logo used from 2001 to 2002
- Formerly: ONdigital plc, British Digital Broadcasting plc
- Type: Joint venture
- Industry: Media
- Founded: 15 January 1997; 29 years ago (as British Digital Broadcasting)
- Defunct: 18 October 2002; 24 years ago (as ITV Digital)
- Fate: Bankruptcy, liquidation
- Successor: Freeview (terrestrial broadcaster); Top Up TV (pay TV service)
- Headquarters: Marco Polo House, Battersea, London, United Kingdom
- Products: Pay TV services and programming
- Owner: Carlton Communications; Granada

ITV Digital was a British digital terrestrial television broadcaster which launched a pay-TV service on the world's first digital terrestrial television network. Its main shareholders were Carlton Communications plc and Granada plc, owners of multiple licences of the ITV network. Starting as ONdigital in 1998, the service was rebranded as ITV Digital in July 2001.

Low audience figures, piracy issues and an ultimately unaffordable multi-million pound deal with the Football League led to the broadcaster suffering large losses, and it entered administration in March 2002. Pay television services ceased permanently on 1 May of that year, but carriage of the remaining free-to-air channels such as BBC One and Channel 4 continued. In October, ITV Digital’s former terrestrial multiplexes were taken over by Crown Castle and the BBC to create the Freeview free-to-air service.

== History ==
British Digital Broadcasting logo (1997–1998)

On 31 January 1997, Carlton Television, Granada Television and satellite company British Sky Broadcasting (BSkyB) together created British Digital Broadcasting (BDB) as a joint venture, and applied to operate three digital terrestrial television (DTT) licences. They faced competition from a rival, Digital Television Network (DTN), a company created by cable operator CableTel (later known as NTL). On 25 June 1997, BDB won the auction and the Independent Television Commission (ITC) awarded the sole broadcast licence for DTT to the consortium. Then on 20 December 1997, the ITC awarded three pay-TV digital multiplex licences to BDB.

That same year, however, the ITC forced BSkyB out of the consortium on competition grounds; this effectively placed Sky in direct competition with the new service as Sky would also launch its digital satellite service in 1998, although Sky was still required to provide key channels such as Sky Movies and Sky Sports to BDB. With Sky as part of the consortium, British Digital Broadcasting would have paid discounted rates to carry Sky's television channels. Instead, with its positioning as a competitor, Sky charged the full market rates for the channels, at an extra cost of around £60million a year to BDB. On 28 July 1998, BDB announced the service would be called ONdigital, and claimed it would be the biggest television brand launch in history. The company would be based in Marco Polo House (since demolished) in Battersea, south London, which was previously the home of BSkyB's earlier rival, British Satellite Broadcasting (BSB).

Six multiplexes were set up, with three of them allocated to the existing analogue broadcasters. The other three multiplexes were auctioned off. ONdigital was given one year from the award of the licence to launch the first DTT service. In addition to launching audio and video services, it also led the specification of an industry-wide advanced interactive engine, based on MHEG-5. This was an open standard that was used by all broadcasters on DTT.

=== The launch ===
ONdigital logo from 1998 to 2001

ONdigital was officially launched on 15 November 1998 amid a large public ceremony featuring celebrity Ulrika Jonsson and fireworks around the Crystal Palace transmitting station. Its competitor Sky Digital had already debuted on 1 October. The service launched with 12 primary channels, which included the new BBC Choice and ITV2 channels; a subscription package featuring channels such as Sky One, Cartoon Network, E4, UKTV channels and many developed in-house by Carlton and Granada such as Carlton World; premium channels including Sky Sports 1 and 3 (later including 2), Sky Premier and Sky MovieMax; and the newly launched FilmFour.

From the beginning, however, the company was quickly losing money. Supply problems with set-top boxes meant that the company missed Christmas sales and retailers had to wait several months for the customers to receive their boxes. Meanwhile, aggressive marketing by BSkyB for Sky Digital made the ONdigital offer look unattractive. The new digital satellite service provided a dish, digibox, installation and around 200 channels for £159, a lower price than ONdigital at £199. Sky had also launched earlier, meaning they had a head start over the ONdigital service. ONdigital's subscription pricing had been set to compare with the older Sky analogue service of 20 channels. In 1999, digital cable services were launched by NTL, Telewest and Cable & Wireless.

In February 1999, ITV secured the rights for UEFA Champions League football matches for four years, which would partly be broadcast through ONdigital. Two sports channels were added to the platform, Champions ON 28 and Champions ON 99 (later renamed ONsport 1 and ONsport 2 when it secured the rights to ATP tennis games), the latter of which timeshared with Carlton Cinema. Throughout 1999, channels including MTV and British Eurosport launched on the platform. The exclusive Carlton Kids and Carlton World channels closed in 2000 to make way for two Discovery channels.

ONdigital reported in April 1999 that it had 110,000 subscribers, while Sky Digital had over 350,000 by that time. By March 2000, there were 673,000 ONdigital customers.

The first interactive digital service was launched in mid-1999, called ONgames. On 7 March 2000, ONmail was launched which provided an interactive e-mail service. A deal with multiplex operator SDN led to the launch of pay-per-view service ONrequest on 1 May 2000. In June 2000, ONoffer was launched. On 18 September 2000, the internet TV service ONnet was launched.

On 17 June 2000, ONdigital agreed to a £315 million three-year deal with the Football League to broadcast 88 live Nationwide League and Worthington Cup matches from the 2001–02 season.

=== Setbacks ===
In 1999, Sky started to give away their digiboxes for free whilst the customer subscribed. This was a problem for ONdigital, as they had no choice but to sell prepaid set top boxes to win customers back from rival services. Even when they decided to sell prepaid set top boxes (under the ONprepaid brand), they could not easily compete with Sky.

ONdigital's growth slowed throughout 2000, and by the start of 2001 the number of subscribers was no longer increasing; meanwhile, its competitor Sky Digital oversaw a dramatic increase in subscribers, spearheaded by the launch of interactive services, such as Open... and Sky Gamestar, and the launch of rival cable digital services from the likes of NTL and Telewest ate into ONdigital's subscriber numbers. The ONdigital management team responded with a series of free set-top box promotions, initially at retailers such as Currys and Dixons, when ONdigital receiving equipment was purchased at the same time as a television set or similarly priced piece of equipment. These offers eventually became permanent, with the set-top box loaned to the customer at no charge for as long as they continued to subscribe to ONdigital, an offer that was matched by Sky. ONdigital's churn rate, a measure of the number of subscribers leaving the service, reached 28% during 2001.

Additional problems for ONdigital were the choice of 64QAM broadcast mode, which when coupled with far weaker than expected broadcast power, meant that the signal was weak in many areas; a complex pricing structure with many options; a poor-quality subscriber management system (adapted from Canal+); a paper magazine TV guide whereas BSkyB had an electronic programme guide (EPG); insufficient technical customer services; and much signal piracy. While there was a limited return path provided via an in-built 2400 baud modem, there was no requirement, as there was with BSkyB, to connect the set-top box's modem to a phone line.

With this combination of factors contributing to the service's lack of popularity, in 2001, executives at ONdigital management wrote a letter to the government, asking for emergency funding to finance the service in order to keep it alive due to a lack of customers and paying members.

==== Loaned equipment ====
ONdigital viewing card

ONdigital began to sell prepaid set-top boxes (under the name ONprepaid) from November 1999 in order to win customers, especially at the launch of other digital services from the likes of NTL and Telewest. This bundle sold in high street shops and supermarkets at a price that included the set-top box (which was technically on loan) and the first year's subscription package. These prepaid boxes amounted to 50% of sales in December 1999. Thousands of these packages were also sold at well below retail price on auction sites such as the then-popular QXL. As the call to activate the viewing card did not require any bank details, many ONdigital boxes which were supposed to be on loan were at unverifiable addresses. This was later changed so a customer could not buy a box without ONdigital verifying their address. Many customers did not activate the viewing card at all, although where the viewer's address was known, ONdigital would write informing them that they must activate before a certain deadline.

==== Piracy ====
The ONdigital pay-per-view channels were encrypted using a system – SECA MediaGuard – which had subsequently been cracked by hackers working for NDS Group, the makers of the VideoGuard system that Sky Digital used. ONdigital did not update this system, therefore it was possible to produce and sell counterfeit subscription cards which would give access to all the channels. About 100,000 pirate cards were in circulation by 2002, and these played a role in the demise of the broadcaster that year.

=== Rebranding ===
In April 2001 it was said that ONdigital would be 'relaunched' to bring it closer to the ITV network and to better compete with Sky. On 11 July 2001 Carlton and Granada rebranded ONdigital as ITV Digital.

Other services were also rebranded, such as ONnet to ITV Active. A rebranding campaign was launched, with customers being sent ITV Digital stickers to place over the ONdigital logos on their remote controls and set top boxes. The software running on the receivers was not changed, however, and continued to display 'ON' on nearly every screen. However, iDTVs made after the rebrand removed the 'ON' prefix from their software. Option 7 on the main menu on iDTVs was also renamed from "ONdigital Updates" to "Subscription Information".

The rebrand was not without controversy, as SMG plc (owner of Scottish Television and Grampian Television), UTV and Channel Television pointed out that the ITV brand did not belong solely to Carlton and Granada. SMG and UTV initially refused to carry the advertising campaign for ITV Digital and did not allow the ITV Sport Channel space on their multiplex, thus it was not available at launch in most of Scotland and Northern Ireland. The case was resolved in Scotland and the Channel Islands and later still in Northern Ireland, allowing ITV Sport to launch in the non-Carlton and Granada regions, although it was never made available in the Channel Islands, where there was no DTT or cable, and it never appeared on Sky Digital.

Later in 2001, ITV Sport Channel was announced. This would be a premium sport channel, and would broadcast English football games as per the company's deal with the Football League in 2000, as well as ATP tennis games and Champions League games previously covered by ONsport 1 and ONsport 2. The channel launched on 11 August of that year, and was also carried on cable by NTL.

=== Downfall ===
The service reached 1 million subscribers by January 2001, whereas Sky Digital had 5.7 million. Granada reported £69 million in losses in the first six months of 2001, leading some investors to urge it to close or sell ONdigital/ITV Digital. ITV Digital was unable to make a deal to put the ITV Sport Channel on Sky, which could have given the channel access to millions of Sky customers and generated income; the channel was only licensed to cable company NTL. Subscriptions for ONnet/ITV Active, its internet service, peaked at around 100,000 customers. ITV Digital had a 12% share of digital subscribers as of December 2001. ITV Digital and Granada cut jobs that month. By 2002, the company was thought to be losing up to £1 million per day.

In February 2002, Carlton and Granada said that ITV Digital needed an urgent "fundamental restructuring". The biggest cost the company faced was its three-year deal with the Football League, which had been deemed too expensive by critics when agreed, as it was inferior to the top-flight Premiership coverage from Sky Sports. It was reported on 21 March 2002 that ITV Digital had proposed paying only £50 million for the remaining two years of the Football League deal, a reduction of £129m. Chiefs from the League said that any reduction in the payment could threaten the existence of many football clubs, which had budgeted for large incomes from the television contract.

=== Administration ===
On 27 March 2002, ITV Digital was placed in administration as it was unable to pay the full amount due to the Football League. Later, as chances of its survival remained bleak, the Football League sued Carlton and Granada, claiming that the firms had breached their contract in failing to deliver the guaranteed income. On 1 August the league lost the case, with the judge ruling that it had "failed to extract sufficient written guarantees". The league then filed a negligence claim against its own lawyers for failing to press for a written guarantee at the time of the deal with ITV Digital. From this, in June 2006, it was awarded a paltry £4 in damages of the £150m it was seeking. The collapse put in doubt the government's ambition to switch off analogue terrestrial TV signals by 2010.

Despite several interested parties, the administrators were unable to find a buyer for the company and effectively put it into liquidation on 26 April 2002. Most subscription channels stopped broadcasting on ITV Digital on 1 May 2002 at 7 am, with only free-to-air services continuing. The next day, ITV chief executive Stuart Prebble quit. In all, 1,500 jobs were lost by ITV Digital's collapse. ITV Digital was eventually placed into liquidation on 18 October, with debts of £1.25 billion.

=== Post-collapse ===
By 30 April 2002, the Independent Television Commission (ITC) had revoked ITV Digital's broadcasting licence and started looking for a buyer. A consortium made up of the BBC and Crown Castle submitted an application on 13 June, later joined by BSkyB, and were awarded the licence on 4 July. They launched the Freeview service on 30 October 2002, offering 30 free-to-air TV channels and 20 free-to-air radio channels including several interactive channels such as BBC Red Button and Teletext, but no subscription or premium services. Those followed on 31 March 2004 when Top Up TV began broadcasting 11 pay TV channels in timeshared broadcast slots.

From 10 December 2002, ITV Digital's liquidators started to ask customers to return their set top boxes or pay a £39.99 fee. Had this been successful, it could have threatened to undermine the fledgling Freeview service, since at the time most digital terrestrial receivers in households were ONdigital and ITV Digital legacy hardware. In January 2003, Carlton and Granada stepped in and paid £2.8m to the liquidators to allow the boxes to stay with their customers, because at the time the ITV companies received a discount on their broadcasting licence payments based on the number of homes they had converted to digital television. It was also likely done to avoid further negativity towards the two companies.

During the time under administration, Carlton and Granada were in talks regarding a merger, which was eventually cleared in 2004.

==== Effect on football clubs ====
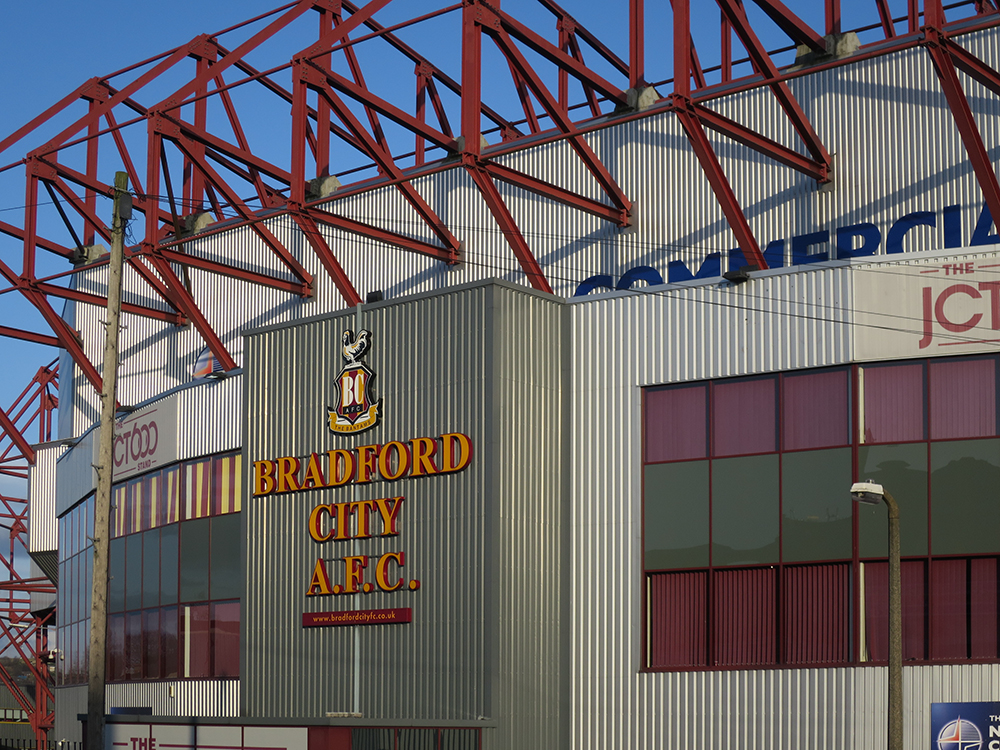
ITV Digital's collapse contributed to Bradford City F.C. being put into administration

Following the proposed Football League merger, with the lucrative finances it proposed, ITV Digital's collapse had a large effect on many football clubs. Bradford City F.C. was one of the affected, and its debt forced it into administration in May 2002, followed by Leicester City in October.

Barnsley F.C. also entered administration in October 2002, despite the club making a profit for the twelve years prior to the collapse of ITV Digital. Barnsley had budgeted on the basis that the money from the ITV Digital deal would be received, leaving a £2.5 million shortfall in their accounts when the broadcaster collapsed.

Clubs were forced to slash staff, and some players were forced to be sold as they were unable to pay them. Some clubs increased ticket prices for fans to offset the losses.

The rights to show Football League matches were resold to Sky Sports for £95 million for the next four years compared to £315 million over three years from ITV Digital, leading to a reduction from £2 million per season to £700,000 in broadcasting revenue for First Division clubs.

In total, fourteen Football League clubs were placed in administration within four years of the collapse of ITV Digital, compared to four in the four years before.

== News Corporation hacking allegations ==
On 31 March 2002, French cable company Canal+ accused Rupert Murdoch's News Corporation in the United States of extracting the UserROM code from its MediaGuard encryption cards and leaking it onto the internet. In September of 2002, it was alleged that on a call with investors, Sky's chief executive, Tony Ball also referenced the hacking -- he had allegedly said "ITV Digital/DTT is completely pirated, a joke. For $7 you can buy a card for all channels." At around the same time, ITV Digital alleged that over 100,000 pirated cards were in circulation and that foreign markets for Canal+ cards were "flooded" with pirate smart cards.

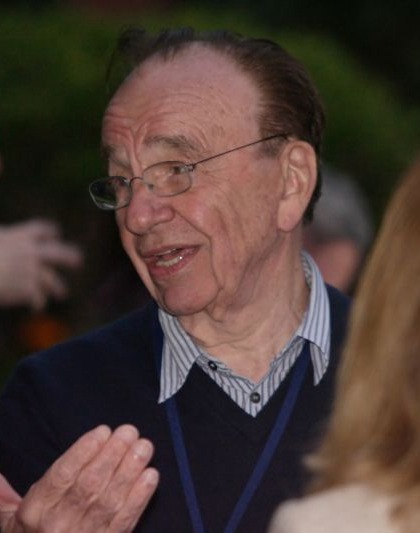
Rupert Murdoch's Sky and NDS subsidiary faced renewed scrutiny after the 2012 Panorama investigation.

Canal+ brought a lawsuit against News Corporation alleging that it, through its subsidiary NDS (which provides encryption technology for Sky and other TV services from Murdoch), had been working on breaking the MediaGuard smartcards used by Canal+, ITV Digital and other non-Murdoch-owned TV companies throughout Europe. The action was later partially dropped after News Corporation agreed to buy Canal+'s struggling Italian operation Telepiu, a direct rival to a Murdoch-owned company in that country.

Other legal action by EchoStar/NagraStar was being pursued as late as August 2005, accusing NDS of the same wrongdoing. In 2008, NDS was found to have broken piracy laws by hacking EchoStar Communications' smart card system, however only $1,500 in statutory damages was awarded.

On 26 March 2012, an investigation from BBC's Panorama found evidence that one of News Corporation's subsidiaries sabotaged ITV Digital.

The episode stated that before OnDigital, several hackers including hacker Lee Gibling had started a hacking website The House of Ill Compute (THOIC) and along with other hackers had been looking at how to get access to satellite channels without paying, including Sky TV and foreign channels, and in the course of his activities had been investigated by Israeli firm NDS's security unit and jointly funded by Sky TV, and had hired him as a consultant on £65,000 per year (£137,260 adjusted for inflation in 2026), with the intention of making THOIC a part of the company's portfolio.

According to the documentary, the unit was headed up by former head of MET Police Criminal Intelligence, Ray Adams and his number two, Len Withall, a former UK police chief inspector in Surrey. The BBC conducted hidden camera interviews in which both Withall and Adams stated they had been involved in overseeing the operation, with Adams agreeing he paid Gibling. Gibling, the principal hacker for THOIC said that if he required more resources, he would call up Ray Adams and simply ask for more resources and the money was always there.

The BBC interviewed hacker Oliver Koemmerling, who stated when interviewed that he had previously hacked into Sky's smart card system in 1996 was approached by Ray Adams from NDS. Koemmerling said that Ray Adams had offered him a job in haifa, israel, where he worked in a laboratory analysing competing products, including the encryption and security systems of Sky competitors, including the Canal+ system that OnDigital were using (MediaGuard).

Koemmerling stated that they had successfully managed to crack the encryption keys used within the Canal+ card. Later these keys leaked onto a Canadian hacking site -- Koemmerling when asked if they keys were the ones obtained in the haifa office stated that based on the timestamp, the chance that it did not come from that office was "astronomically small", and that he had no doubt the keys were the ones obtained in haifa.

During this time, a meeting was allegedly arranged between Ray Adams and hacker Lee Gibling as well as with other NDS representatives where it was revealed that a hack for OnDigital was being worked on. When the codes were cracked by Koemmerling's team in haifa, Gibling states that NDS delivered the software and keys for OnDigital as well as the keys, with instructions that the software and keys enabling piracy for OnDigital/Canal+ smart cards, go to "the widest possible community".

Other outlets also reported on ONdigital/ITV Digital smartcard data and leaked them through a pirate website under Murdoch's control – actions which enabled pirated cards to flood the market. Lawyers for News Corporation claimed that these accusations of illegal activities against a rival business are "false and libellous".

In June 2013 the Metropolitan Police decided to look into these allegations following a request by Labour MP Tom Watson.

== Marketing ==
ITV Digital ran an advertising campaign involving the comedian Johnny Vegas as Al and a knitted monkey simply called Monkey, voiced by Ben Miller. A knitted replica of Monkey could be obtained by signing up to ITV Digital. Because the monkey could not be obtained without signing up to the service, a market for second-hand monkeys developed. At one time, original ITV Digital Monkeys were fetching several hundred pounds on eBay, and knitting patterns delivered by email were sold for several pounds. The campaign was created by the advertising agency Mother. In August 2002, following ITV Digital's collapse, Vegas claimed that he was owed money for the advertisements. In early 2007, Monkey and Al reappeared in an advert for PG Tips tea, which at first included a reference to ITV Digital's downfall.

== Set top boxes ==
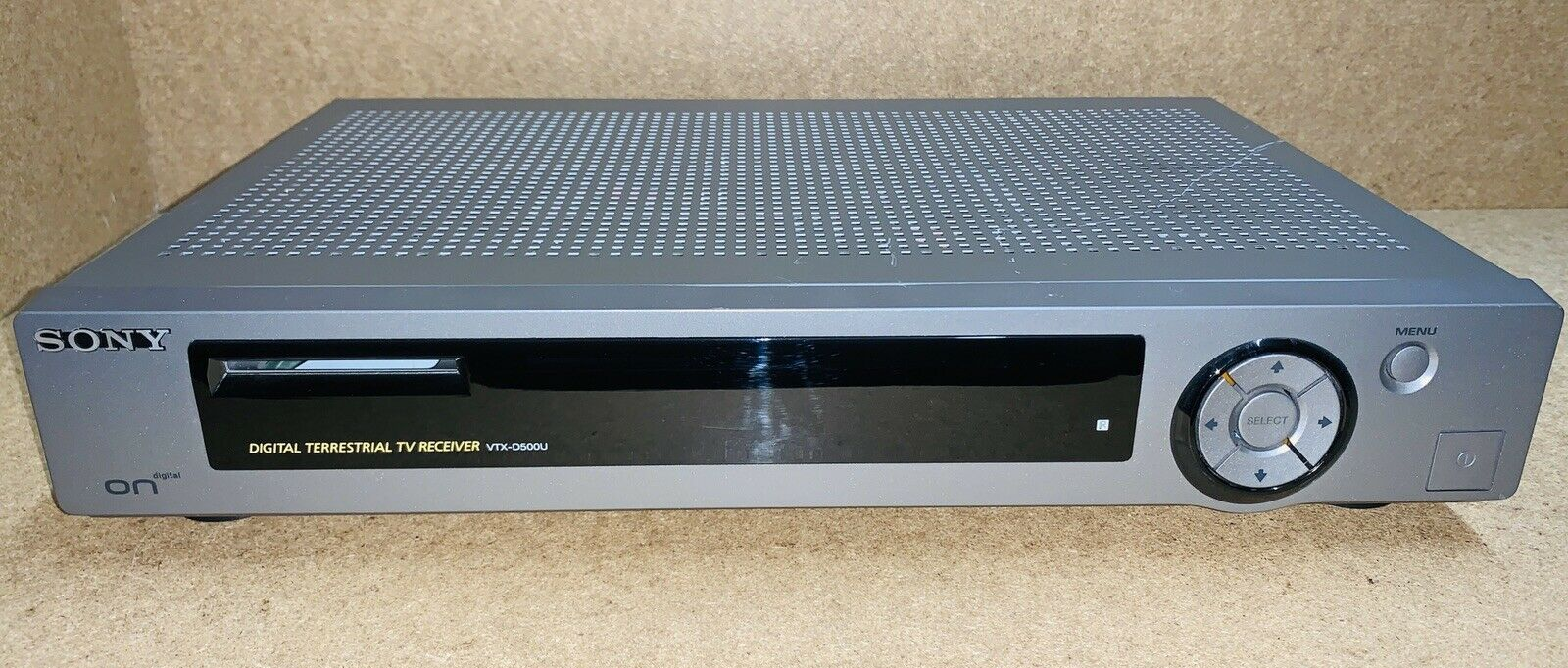
Sony VTX-D500U Set Top Box

The set-top boxes used for ITV Digital and ONdigital were:

- Nokia Mediamaster 9850T
- Pace Micro Technology DTR-730, DTR-735
- Philips DTX 6370, DTX 6371, DTX 6372
- Pioneer DBR-T200, DBR-T210
- Sony VTX-D500U
- Toshiba DTB2000

== Carlton/Granada digital television channels ==
Carlton and Granada (later ITV Digital Channels Ltd) created a selection of channels which formed some of the core content available via the service. These were:

Channel name	Channel no.	Year removed	Reason/Notes
Carlton Kids	34	2000	Timeshared with Carlton World. Replaced by a timeshare of Discovery Kids and Discovery Wings.
Carlton World	34	2000	Timeshared with Carlton Kids. Replaced by a timeshare of Discovery Wings and Discovery Kids.
Carlton Select	35	2000	Timeshared with Carlton Food Network.
First ONdigital	20	2000	Provided exclusive coverage of sports events, concerts and ONdigital features/channels.
ONoffer	20	2001	Provided offers on products. Was replaced by Wellbeing.
ONsport 1	99	2001	Originally known as Champions ON 99. Replaced by ITV Sport Channel, ITV Sport Extra and ITV Sport Select.
ONsport 2	28/98	2001	Originally known as Champions ON 28, then Champions ON 98. Timeshared with Carlton Cinema. Replaced by ITV Sport Channel, ITV Sport Extra and ITV Sport Select.
Taste CFN	35	2001	Known as Carlton Food Network until 1 May 2001. Timeshared with Carlton Select before extending hours until closure.
ONview	20	2001	Served as a portal to the ONdigital service, containing services like ONoffer, ONsport results and ONrequest movie showing times.
Granada Breeze	31	2002	Known as Granada Good Life until 1 May 1998. Timesharing with Men & Motors (Known as Granada Men & Motors until 2001, ceased during 2010).
ITV Select	50	2002	Known as ONrequest until 22 August 2001.
ITV Sport Channel	20	2002	Replaced ONsport 1 and was also available on NTL's service. Closed due to ITV Digital's liquidation.
ITV Sport Plus	99	2002	Replaced ONsport 2, but it is unknown if it was on rival digital services like ITV Sport Channel. Closed due to ITV Digital's liquidation.
ITV Sport Select	98	2002	Provided a pay-per-view service for sports events, in the same way as ONrequest/ITV Select. Closed due to ITV Digital's liquidation.
Shop!	19	2002	Joint venture between Granada and Littlewoods.
Wellbeing	47	2001	Joint venture between Granada and Boots. Replaced ONoffer service.
ITV Text+	16	2002	Operated mostly in the same way as BBC Text, but provided ITV programme information. Closed due to ITV Digital's liquidation.
Carlton Cinema	28	2003	Timeshared with Champions ON 28/98, then timeshared with ONsport 2.
Plus	30	2004	Known as Granada Plus until 1998, then G Plus until 2002. Closed due to launch of ITV3.
ITV News Channel	48	2005	Known as ITN News Channel until after the collapse of ITV Digital.
ITV2	6	—N/a	Still broadcasting.

== See also ==
- Sky UK
- Top Up TV
- Freeview
- History of Freeview UK
- NDS Group
- Digital terrestrial television in the United Kingdom
