= CCXTV =

British digital television channel owned by UKTV

- Broadcast area: United Kingdom; Ireland

Programming
- Language: English
- Picture format: SDTV 16:9 576i

Ownership
- Owner: UKTV (BBC Studios)
- Sister channels: Alibi; Dave; Drama; Eden; Gold; W Yesterday

History
- Launched: 15 April 2020; 6 years ago
- Replaced: Create and Craft
- Closed: 1 February 2021; 5 years ago
- Replaced by: Drama+1

Availability

Terrestrial
- Freeview: Channel 73

CCXTV was a short-lived British free-to-air television channel launched on 15 April 2020 by Ideal World as an entertainment channel. It took over Create and Craft's Freeview LCN 23. The channel was on air from 07:00 until 22:00, with a schedule of imports and re-runs of shows like The Bold and The Beautiful.

The channel was sold to UKTV in October 2020 to allow them to move Dave Ja Vu into LCN 23, resulting in CCXTV moving to LCN 73 on 7 December 2020. On 25 January 2021 it was announced that the channel would close on 1 February 2021 and be replaced by Drama +1.
