= Discovery Wings (UK & Ireland) =

Ownership
- Owner: Discovery Networks Europe

History
- Launched: 1 February 2000
- Replaced: Carlton World
- Closed: 1 March 2007
- Replaced by: Discovery Turbo
- Former names: Discovery Wings Channel (2000-2001)

Discovery Wings was a British TV channel devoted to documentaries regarding aircraft and as a brand extension of Wings, a staple documentary programme of the Discovery Channel throughout the 1990s. In the United States it has been replaced by the Military Channel, which still has a large portion of its programming dedicated to military aviation. The channel timeshared with Discovery Kids.

The channel initially began broadcasting exclusively on the On Digital service as an evenings/overnight channel, timesharing with Discovery Kids. Both had been created for the created for On Digital, and was initially exclusive to that platform. However, it was only available on that platform for around 18 months because on 12 October 2001 it was announced that the main Discovery Channel would launch on ITV Digital on 17 October, with Discovery announcing that it would fully replace both Kids and Wings on 18 November.

The channel eventually became available on other digital platforms such as Sky Digital, and Virgin Media. In the UK, Discovery Wings was axed in favour of a new channel called Discovery Turbo, on 1 March 2007 whose remit was widened to include also programmes related to speed and all motor vehicles.

== See also ==
- Discovery Kids (UK & Ireland)
