= Carlton Select =

British digital television channel

- Carlton Select's logo after the 1996 relaunch.

Ownership
- Owner: Carlton Television (subdivision of Carlton Communications plc)

History
- Launched: 1 June 1995; 31 years ago
- Closed: 1 March 2000; 26 years ago
- Former names: SelecTV (1995–96)

Availability (at time of closure)

Terrestrial
- ONdigital: Channel 35

Carlton Select was a British digital television channel, owned by Carlton Television. It was originally launched on cable in 1995 as SelecTV, by the independent production company of the same name, before being purchased by Carlton in 1996 who relaunched it as Carlton Select.

The channel was also available via satellite in Africa, on the South African DStv service, from the start of the platform to the shutdown of the channel.

== History ==
In March 1995, SelecTV, an independent production company, announced plans to launch their own television network. SelecTV launched on 1 June 1995 as a basic-tier cable-only service. The service was operated by an independent production company of the same name, and broadcast on weekdays from 5:00 pm to Midnight, and on weekends from 12:00 pm to Midnight. Much of the channel's schedule consisted of original programmes produced by the company, while acquisitions were mostly taken from the BBC, Yorkshire, Anglia and Central programming archives. At the end of the year, SelecTV gained offers from Flextech and Pearson Television for a potential purchase, which if was the case, the company would have to sell the TV channel and its 15% stake in Meridian Broadcasting.

In January 1996, SelecTV's operations were sold to Pearson Television. The channel was sold to Carlton Communications for £5.2 million. In April, Carlton announced that the channel would be relaunched as Carlton Select on 9 May. Under its new name, the channel was branded as "The UK's leading entertainment cable channel" with output from a variety of different genres, including quiz shows, films, dramas and comedies. Carlton Select also occasionally showed live coverage of the UEFA Champions League. On 1 September 1996, Carlton Food Network launched in the channel's daytime capacity, allowing Carlton Select to start at 5:00pm every day.

With the launch of ONdigital in November 1998, Carlton Select was one of the service's launch channels.

The future of the channel was being considered internally as early as mid-1999. It was initially expected to be replaced by ITV Gold, which was part of a strategy from the ITV companies to counter the rise of BBC Worldwide and Flextech's UKTV venture. On 22 December, Carlton officially announced that the channel would close due to poor viewing figures, and that its broadcast capacity on ONDigital would be taken over fully by Carlton Food Network.

The channel closed at the late hours of 1 March 2000, with Gridlock being the last programme to air on the service. While Carlton Food Network took over its slot entirely on ONDigital, its capacity on Analogue cable was taken over by Carlton Cinema.

== Programmes ==
- A Country Practice
- A Kind of Living
- Airline
- Auf Wiedersehen, Pet
- The Beiderbecke Trilogy
- Birds of a Feather
- Blockbusters
- Blue Heelers
- Blues and Twos
- Boon
- Byker Grove (Also shown on Carlton Kids)
- The Camomile Lawn
- Chancer
- Desmond's
- Duty Free
- Get Smart!
- The Golden Girls
- Gone to Seed
- Goodnight Sweetheart
- Gridlock
- Hey Dad..!
- Home to Roost
- I Spy
- Lovejoy
- Moonlighting
- My Two Wives
- On the Buses
- Peak Practice
- Perfect Scoundrels
- Rising Damp
- Robin of Sherwood
- The Ruth Rendell Mysteries
- Sharpe
- Soldier Soldier
- St. Elsewhere
- Tales of the Unexpected
- That's Love
- Tracey Ullman: A Class Act
- Tracey Ullman Takes on New York
- UEFA Champions League
- Unnatural Causes
- The Upper Hand
- What's Cooking? (Also shown on Carlton Food Network)
- Yesterday's Dreams
