= ITV Digital Channels =

British media company owned by ITV plc

ITV Digital Channels Limited
- Type: Subsidiary
- Industry: Media
- Founded: 13 December 1995; 30 years ago
- Founders: Granada plc British Sky Broadcasting
- Headquarters: London
- Area served: United Kingdom
- Parent: Granada plc/BSkyB (1995–2004); ITV plc (2004–)

ITV Digital Channels Limited (formerly known as Granada Sky Broadcasting) is a wholly owned subsidiary of British broadcaster ITV plc.

It was set up in December 1995 and operated until 2004 as a joint venture between Granada plc and British Sky Broadcasting to launch a range of television channels broadcasting the Granada and LWT archives on the Sky satellite platform, as well as other digital platforms such as ITV Digital (closed on 1 May 2002), NTL and Telewest (both later merged to form Virgin Media).

On 2 February 2004, Granada plc merged with Carlton Communications to form ITV plc, which fully purchased ITV Digital Channels in November of that year.

== History ==
=== 1995–2002: Launch, digital expansion and rebrands ===
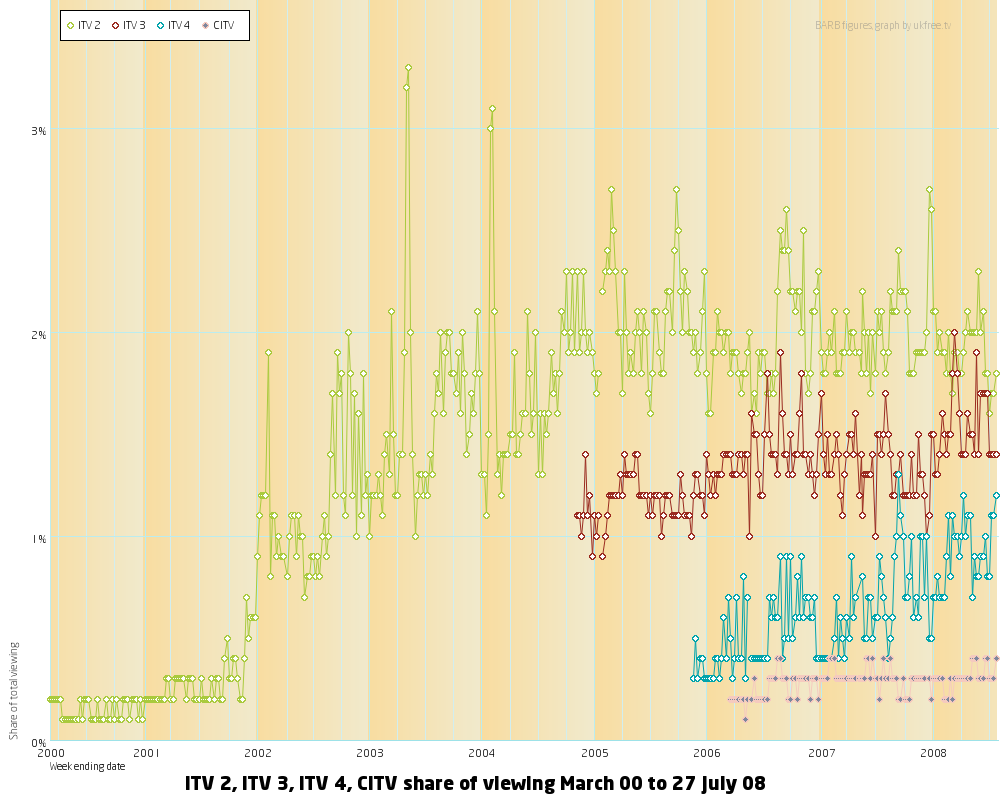
ITV digital channels viewing share between 2000 and 2008

On 13 December 1995, Granada plc and BSkyB agreed to create a joint venture to operate four services on Sky and other cable platforms. The services were:

- Granada Plus, an archive channel using the Granada and LWT archives (de-branded from Granada on 9 September 2002)
- Granada Men & Motors, a channel aimed at men, focused on motoring and erotic content (de-branded from Granada on 12 August 2001)
- Granada Good Life, a women's lifestyle channel (renamed to Breeze on 1 May 1998)
- Granada Talk TV, a talk shows channel (closed on 31 August 1997 due to low ratings)

The GSkyB portfolio greatly increased its reach with the launch of ONdigital, which Granada and Carlton, another dominant ITV rights holder, were funding, in October and November 1998. Granada Plus and Men & Motors performed well in ratings, but Breeze struggled to attract viewers, leading to budget cuts that resulted in original programming being cut and 60 jobs being lost. In December 2001, the decision was made to close the channel with a gradual closure across digital platforms. It was finally closed on 30 April 2002 to honour contracts with Telewest and NTL.

Throughout 2001 and 2002, the channels began to disassociate from Granada branding. Men & Motors received a major rebrand in August 2001, and the Granada brand was dropped from Plus in September 2002.

=== 2003–2004: Uncertain future ===
In late November 2003, the future of GSkyB was thrown into uncertainty as Granada and Carlton – soon to merge as ITV plc – looked to increase their multichannel presence. ITV Gold was conceived as a new archive channel similar to Plus, but over time this evolved to ITV3, with Plus' first run rights to archive drama being sought after for the new channel. ITV was also negotiating with Sky over carriage of ITV3, eventually reaching an impasse due to the lack of EPG space on some Sky Digiboxes. It was later announced with carriage on Freeview, NTL and Telewest, but with no Sky carriage. Many had expected GSkyB to either be sold or closed entirely, an option ITV considered as it began the sale of non-core assets.

=== 2004–present: ITV plc control and multichannel expansion ===
On 1 November 2004, ITV plc agreed to purchase BSkyB's stake in GSkyB for £10 million. The deal included the slot that Granada Plus was broadcasting on, which ITV used to broadcast its new ITV3 channel which replaced Plus on the same day. The negotiations that led to ITV plc taking sole control of GSkyB, closing Plus and launching ITV3 on digital satellite were apparently completed just hours before the new channel started broadcasting. On 8 November, Granada Sky Broadcasting was renamed ITV Digital Channels Limited, shortly after the closure of Granada Plus left Men & Motors as the sole survivor of the original four channels. As part of ITV's buy-out of Sky's shareholding, Sky would have received 49.5% of any proceeds (net of liabilities) from any future sale of Men & Motors.

On 2 May 2005, Men & Motors launched as a free-to-air channel on the Freeview digital terrestrial television service. It was rumoured that ITV plc would replace it with ITV4, another men's channel, when it launched later that year on 1 November, echoing the launch of ITV3 in 2004. However, after better than expected performance from Men & Motors as a free-to-air channel, both channels continued and ITV plc cut the hours of the ITV News Channel to make way for ITV4 and CITV instead. The news channel closed on 23 December of that year with its remaining bandwidth used for CITV.

Although ITV4 started broadcasting from the Astra satellite on 1 November, it was not placed on the Sky EPG until 7 November. Because of this, some ITV4 sports programming was simulcast on Men & Motors under the ITV4 on m&m strand. On 23 February 2006, despite the previous decision not to close Men & Motors, fresh rumours over the channel's future began to circulate due to poorer than expected performance from ITV4. In April 2006, Men & Motors left Freeview to make way for the launch of ITV Play, and much of its content was moved over to ITV4. ITV intended to dispose of the channel as a non-core asset, but it ultimately closed on Virgin Media on 25 March 2010, and finally closed on Sky and Freesat on 1 April, to make way for a permanent EPG position for ITV HD.

In 2014, ITV's portfolio of channels was expanded with the launch of ITV Encore, a drama channel, and ITVBe, a reality and lifestyle channel. The launch of the latter lead to ITV2's repositioning as a youth-focused entertainment channel. In 2018, ITV closed the Encore channel and repositioned its content to the ITV Hub online service. In 2021, commissions for ITV2, ITVBe and CITV were altered in that they would debut first on the ITV Hub, then on the linear channels, whilst ITV2 was given a wider brief for producing factual content.

The CITV channel closed on 1 September 2023, with programming moved to streaming service ITVX. A daily programming block was introduced on ITV2 from 2 September 2023 to 10 April 2026, from 05:00 to 09:00, using the "CITV" brand.

== Channels ==
=== Current ===
ITV operates the following digital television channels:

- ITV2 (including ITV2 +1 and HD) – General entertainment and reality
- ITV3 (including ITV3 +1 and HD) – Drama and movies
- ITV4 (including ITV4 +1 and HD) – Sports and entertainment
- ITV Quiz – Quiz shows and entertainment

=== Former ===
GSkyB's logo banner used from 1996 to 1998

- Plus – Launched as Granada Plus on 1 October 1996, showing entertainment programmes from the archives of Granada, LWT and its subsidiaries. Closed on 1 November 2004 to allow ITV3 to launch on Sky.
- Granada Breeze – Launched as Granada Good Life on 1 October 1996, a lifestyle channel divided into four 3-hour segments: 'Food & Wine', 'Health & Beauty', 'TV High Street' and 'Home & Garden'. Relaunched on 1 May 1998 in order to improve ratings but closed on 30 April 2002.
- Men & Motors – Launched on 1 October 1996, a channel aimed at men focused on motoring and erotic content. Last of the original Granada Sky Broadcasting channels to close on 1 April 2010.
- Granada Talk TV – A debate channel launched on 1 October 1996. Closed on 31 August 1997.
- ITV Play – Interactive gaming channel launched in April 2006. It closed in March 2007
- ITV Encore (and ITV Encore +1) – A drama channel launched on 9 June 2014. Closed on 1 May 2018.
- The Store – A shopping channel, which was a joint-venture with JML. Removed from Freeview in January 2019.
- ITV Box Office – A pay-per-view sports channel. Closed on 24 January 2020.
- Merit – A short-lived lifestyle channel. Sold to Sky on 20 August 2020.
- CITV – For children under 12 years old. Closed as a channel on 1 September 2023. Programming moved to ITVX and a daily morning slot on ITV2. The ITV2 block closed on 10 April 2026.
- ITVBe (including ITVBe +1 and HD) – Reality television and lifestyle launched in 2014 as a spinoff of ITV2. The channel closed on 9 June 2025 and was replaced by an all quiz channel.
