= Plus (British TV channel) =

TV channel run by Granada Sky Broadcasting

- Logo used from 2002 until 2004.

Ownership
- Owner: Granada Sky Broadcasting

History
- Launched: 1 October 1996; 30 years ago
- Closed: 1 November 2004; 21 years ago
- Replaced by: ITV3
- Former names: Granada Plus (1996–1998); G Plus (1998–2002)

Plus was a digital channel run by Granada Sky Broadcasting. It was launched on 1 October 1996 under the original name of Granada Plus, and during its availability it underwent successive rebrands as G Plus, G+ and then simply Plus.

However, it remained widely referred to by the public at large by its original name. On 1 November 2004, it was permanently closed down by ITV plc in an attempt to bring its replacement, ITV3, onto Sky.

== History ==
Granada Plus was launched on 1 October 1996 at 7pm. From launch, the channel initially showed only programmes made originally by Granada Television and London Weekend Television (itself recently acquired by Granada Television), such as On the Buses, Crown Court, The Comedians and The Wheeltappers and Shunters Social Club. One of the channel's biggest attractions was a thrice-daily repeat of classic Coronation Street, with a five-episode omnibus every weekend. The channel started showing episodes in original broadcast order from April 1976, (some cut slightly for timing reasons), until they got up to February 1994 on 1 November 2004. After Plus had secured the rights to show programmes originally made by Yorkshire Television, they started showing classic episodes of Emmerdale, usually straight after Coronation Street, at 9:30 in the morning and 12:30 in the afternoon, each weekday.

Many of these programmes would have been unshown since their original transmissions, and hence were of value to those interested in classic television, but these early schedules lacked the commercial appeal of rival channel UK Gold, which had long since moved from showing little-seen gems to broadcasting television's 'greatest hits'.

Before the launch of ITV2, the channel also occasionally broadcast live UEFA Champions League football matches involving either Manchester United or Newcastle United on nights when the national ITV network was unable to broadcast the matches live.

It was not long before Granada Plus revamped their on-screen identity, and in order to look more contemporary, they started showing more recent programmes made by the ITV network (at the time, Granada was buying up old rivals such as Yorkshire Television and Tyne Tees Television, in preparation for a unified ITV plc), as well as programme stock which had been originally shown on the BBC. Granada Plus also began screening many classic US shows popular with British viewers and airing promos with the stars of those shows (such as James MacArthur for Hawaii Five-O, Cheryl Ladd for Charlie's Angels, Philip Michael Thomas for Miami Vice and Ben Murphy for Alias Smith and Jones - the last two had also originally aired on the BBC in Britain). The channel also aired British premieres of at least three US series: 10-8: Officers on Duty, Fortune Hunter and the 1988 revival of Mission: Impossible.

Many of the channel's programmes were cut by up to five minutes for commercial timing purposes, which was not a popular choice with viewers.

=== Closure ===
The future of Plus came into doubt by late 2003, when ITV had planned for a new channel similar to Plus to be launched. Originally conceived as 'ITV Gold', it evolved in its conception to ITV3. It would have been originally launched on both Freeview, NTL and Telewest, with a later launch on Sky in March 2005, likely due to ITV rejecting a deal to encrypt ITV3, and the limitations faced by Sky boxes in exceeding the 500-channel limit. Due to the similarity in both channels' content, many believed that ITV3 would replace Plus, only for this rumour to be frequently debunked by GSB themselves. ITV also looked to either sell or close the GSB channels.

However, come 1 November 2004 — ITV3's launch date — it was looking increasingly likely that ITV plc's new channel would not be launched on Sky Digital. However, frantic discussions were going on behind the scenes: ITV wanted the 7 million or so Sky viewers available; Sky did not want to give Freeview any advantage; and to further complicate matters, ITV wanted the new channel to be as high up on the EPG as possible. ITV looked into Plus, which was in a high EPG slot, channel 118. Plus also had access to archives of programmes that were sought after by ITV for the new channel.

At 1pm on that day, just 8 hours before launch, ITV and Sky finally reached a deal: ITV would buy out Sky's 49.5% stake in GSB for £10 million. This meant ITV plc completely took full control of the two GSB channels, Plus and Men & Motors.

Shortly afterwards, ITV plc decided to close Plus, and moved ITV2 to channel 118 making space for ITV3.

The slide that was shown on analogue cable after Plus closed down in 2004. It continued to be displayed until 2011 when it was finally removed.

An hour-and-a-half later that afternoon, while in the middle of a commercial break, Plus suddenly cut to a closedown slide, and, on digital cable and satellite platforms, shortly afterwards disappeared. The final programme on Plus was Pie in the Sky, but only half of it was shown before ITV ceased transmission of Plus. On Sky, Plus was immediately removed minutes after closure, with ITV2 and ITV3 appearing on channels 118 and 119 in an EPG update. On NTL and Telewest, Plus broadcast a GSB logo with looped music, before cutting into a test card asking viewers to move to ITV3. Transmission of Plus officially ceased at 5:15pm, when it was replaced by holding slides for ITV3. The channel was replaced on digital cable and satellite, but on analogue cable, the closedown slide remained for over six years and was finally removed in April 2011 due to analogue cable becoming obsolete.

The team at Plus were caught unaware as they had sent out their regular highlights email at 3:50pm. ITV3 launched at 9pm.

== Identity ==
The very first identity of Granada Plus upon its launch featured its 1996–1998 logo etched in purple curtains, with either people or objects making contact with it.

The channel was renamed G Plus in 1998, and it received new idents featuring the logo interacting with the background. The idents were replaced in 1999. Around 2002, Granada Plus, now named simply Plus, got a new look, which showed a pale blue ball with a white plus sign on it. The idents showed the 3D logo in everyday places, as seen in the stills of the idents. The idents would be scrapped as Plus was discontinued for ITV3 on 1 November 2004.
