= Carlton Cinema (TV channel) =

British TV channel

Ownership
- Owner: Carlton Communications
- Parent: Carlton Television

History
- Launched: 15 November 1998; 27 years ago
- Closed: 31 March 2003; 23 years ago

Availability (at time of closure)

Terrestrial
- ITV Digital: Channel 28

Carlton Cinema was a British digital film television channel, provided by Carlton Television. It launched in November 1998 on the ITV Digital platform and closed down in March 2003, five months after Carlton went off the air in the London region, being the last Carlton-branded television network to do so. Its sister channels were Carlton Select, Carlton World, Carlton Kids, and Carlton Food Network. The first film shown on the channel was the 1953 film Genevieve. The last film shown on the channel was the 1981 film Body Heat. The channel got additional carriage when it launched on cable in March 2000. It aired as an evening and overnight service, as a replacement for Carlton Select.

== Closure ==
Carlton Cinema struggled to keep going after the ITV Digital platform ceased broadcasting on 1 May 2002. These struggles increased when the channel was removed from NTL's analogue channel line-up in September 2002. At the same time Carlton had been negotiating with BSkyB to get the channel onto Sky, but no deal was agreed. The closure was announced on 4 December 2002. The channel closed on 31 March 2003. On that night came the last three films on Carlton Cinema, Genevieve, which was the first film to be broadcast on the channel's launch night, The Inn of the Sixth Happiness and finally, the 1981 neo-noir Body Heat. Following the conclusion of that film, continuity announcer Fiona Goldman made the closing announcement:

Well, that was the last film on Carlton Cinema. It's been almost four-and-a-half years since we first went to air and during that time, we've shown over 4,000 films. We hope you've enjoyed watching them as much as we've enjoyed showing them. So, from our director of programmes, George McKee, myself, Fiona Goldman, and all the team here at Carlton Cinema, it's been a great pleasure and thank you for having been with us. Now, all we have to do is pick up the popcorn and turn off the lights.

Then they aired a montage of scenes and quotes from all the films they showed, to the tune of Alice Faye's "You'll Never Know" which was regularly being shown on the channel during its final two weeks on the air. The farewell montage concluded with the last words ever heard on the channel:

Carlton Cinema thanks all our viewers for tuning in over the last four years. We hope you've enjoyed watching the films as much as we've enjoyed bringing them to you.

The final image shown was a movie theatre screen curtain (one of the many icons of movie places during the Golden Age of Hollywood) closing, revealing (for the final time) the Carlton Cinema logo with the date of launch (15 November 1998) on the top and the date of closure (31 March 2003) on the bottom. After a final fade to black, the channel's DOG was still seen for twenty more minutes. The channel's transmitters were finally shut down at midnight.
