= Carlton Communications =

Former British media company

Carlton Communications plc
- Final logo, used from 1999 to 2004
- Type: Public
- Traded as: LSE: CCM; Nasdaq: CCTVY
- Industry: Television
- Founded: 1982; 44 years ago
- Defunct: 2 February 2004; 22 years ago
- Fate: Acquired by Granada plc
- Successor: ITV plc
- Headquarters: Knightsbridge, London, United Kingdom
- Key people: Michael P. Green (chairman)
- Products: Carlton Cinema; Carlton Select; Carlton World; Carlton Kids; Carlton Food Network
- Divisions: Carlton Television; Westcountry Television; Central Independent Television; HTV; Carlton Home Entertainment; Carlton America; Carlton International; Action Time; Planet 24
- Subsidiaries: Carlton Screen Advertising; Carlton Publishing Group; ITV Digital (50%); London News Network (50%); GMTV (20%); ITN (18%)

Carlton Communications plc was a British media company. It was led by Michael P. Green and listed on the London Stock Exchange from 1983 until 2 February 2004, when it was bought by Granada plc in a corporate takeover to form ITV plc. Carlton shareholders gained approximately 32% of ITV plc.

As well as being the parent company of Carlton Television it was also involved in several other media and broadcasting businesses and was listed on the London Stock Exchange where it was a constituent of the FTSE 100 Index.

== History ==
=== Founding ===
In 1967 Michael Green established a printing and photo-processing company, Tangent Industries, with his brother-in-law and his father-in-law (the future Lord Wolfson). In 1982, Green bought Transvideo, renaming the company Carlton Television Studios. A year later the name was changed to Carlton Communications when the company went public. Soon after, the Moving Picture Company (MPC), Europe's largest video facilities provider, joined Carlton in a joint venture to acquire the UK subsidiary of California's International Video Corporation, IVC UK Ltd. Carlton acquired MPC itself in July 1983.

=== Television ===
Green tried unsuccessfully to acquire a broadcasting station. He first tried for Thames (see below) before trying for LWT. The Independent Broadcasting Authority (IBA) intervened, allowing Green only a 10 percent share. In response, Green sold his existing 5 percent share for £1 million. Carlton also failed to win the direct satellite broadcasting franchise (despite the fact that Carlton was already operating their own DBS system called "Skyscan"- and presumably continued offering the service until BSB launched in 1990), which went to British Satellite Broadcasting (BSB). In March 1987, Carlton acquired a 20 per cent in Central Television from Ladbrokes for £30million which finally gave Carlton its first stake in a terrestrial broadcasting company. Bob Phillis became Carlton's representative on the board of directors, having previously worked for Central before joining Carlton as managing director. Carlton increased its portfolio of media companies with the acquisition of Zenith Productions for £7.3 million.

Carlton's most significant move was to outbid Thames Television for the ITV London weekday licence in 1991. Previously, in 1985, Carlton had executed a failed take-over bid for Thames after Thorn EMI and British Electric Traction decided to sell its share of Thames. The deal was blocked by both Richard Dunn, chief executive of Thames, and by the IBA, which concluded "the proposal would lead to a major change in the nature and characteristic of a viable ITV programme company". Michael Green was left "bewildered", saying: "We are surprised at the IBA's decision. I'm absolutely certain it would not have been a major change to Thames. We have always suggested that we would make absolutely sure the company would continue to be what it is at this moment in time." IBA said it had nothing against Carlton owning part of an ITV company, but believed 'any' single ownership of an ITV company was undesirable.

Thames finally floated on the stock market in July 1986. A few days afterwards, speculation appeared that Carlton had attempted to buy a sizable number of shares. Michael Green, chairman of Carlton, was quoted as saying, "I can't possibly comment", but a Thames spokesperson said: "It does seem quite likely; however, no one shareholder can own more than 10% of our equity, so it's difficult to see what they might have in mind".

It has been said that Green talked to the then Prime Minister Margaret Thatcher on the matter, which in turn may have helped to shape the Broadcasting Act 1990 which replaced the IBA with the Independent Television Commission and the change in franchise allocation procedures. Carlton Television had a policy of being a publisher-broadcaster, not producing any programmes of its own; even its news was outsourced to London News Network. By 1994, the ITC had criticised the channel for its "poor network programming", and said further improvements could be made.

=== Acquisitions ===
During 1985, US video company, Abekas Video Systems, was purchased for £52.8 million. In 1986, it bought the Complete Post facility, one of the largest production facilities in Hollywood, for $31 million. It also acquired Post Perfect, a post-production company in New York. In March 1987 it acquired Modern Video Productions in Philadelphia for $48 million.

Carlton purchased Skyscan, the satellite dish manufacturer, in 1986. The company was sold on in 1988 because of slow sales and continuing delays in new start-up television services. Carlton's biggest acquisition of the decade came in October 1988, when it bought Technicolor SA for $780m, which led to Carlton becoming the world's largest producer of video cassette duplication and motion picture film processing, serving Hollywood studios and software companies. A year later, Carlton bought United Engineering Industries (UEI) plc for £580m, incorporating Quantel and Solid State Logic, which designed and manufactured professional video and sound products. Carlton later disposed of Solid State Logic in 1999 and Quantel in 2000.

In January 1992, Carlton strengthened its media library when it acquired Pickwick Video, which in turn was re-branded and merged with the existing Carlton library to create Carlton Visual Entertainment. The company acquired a 20% stake in GMTV a month after it won the ITV breakfast franchise 1991 and bought 18% stake in Independent Television News in 1993. Carlton increased its stake in Central Television to 81% in 1994 and two years later added Westcountry Television to its portfolio. The acquisition of Central made Carlton one of the largest television producers in the UK, when Action Time and Planet 24 were added to the company's holding.

The future Prime Minister, David Cameron was director of corporate affairs at Carlton from July 1994 to February 2001, his only venture into employment outside of the political world.

Carlton expanded its non-TV interests by acquiring the Rank Organisation's film library as well as the cinema advertising company Cinema Media (formerly Rank Screen Advertising), the UK's largest cinema sales house at the time, from The Rank Group, renaming it Carlton Screen Advertising. In 1997, along with Granada and British Sky Broadcasting, Carlton bid successfully for the UK national digital terrestrial television licence. Sky was excluded from the eventual company, ONdigital, for competition reasons, and this marked the start of Granada and Carlton working more closely together. That same year, it announced its intention to sell its 15% stake in Home TV, a general entertainment channel in India, which was failing. Channel KTV, based in Singapore, went bankrupt earlier that year; Carlton owned a 31% stake.

In early January 1999, the company bought the ITC television and film library from PolyGram/Seagram for £91 million, which reunited the programme library of Associated Television and Central Television and doubled the stock of its library division Carlton International, by giving it a total of 15,000 hours of programming. Carlton chairman Michael Green said: "The ITC library is a jewel in the crown. We can now unite it with the other gems from Britain's film and television heritage in our excellent library." From September 1999, Central Broadcasting and Westcountry Television were re-branded as Carlton. This later paved the way for the eventual downgrading of all of ITV's regional identities, though the names were never fully dropped as their news programmes Central News and Westcountry Live continued, and eventually returned to the air (albeit as ITV1 Central and ITV1 Westcountry) in 2004. In 2000, United Business & Media proposed a merger with Carlton. However, the parties were outmanoeuvred by Granada, which took over only the television interests of UNM (the rest of the company remained in existence). The broadcasting arm of HTV (though not the majority of its production operations) were sold to Carlton.

In 1999, Technicolor continued expansion with the acquisitions of wholly owned businesses in Canada and Australia and started the development of digital cinema within two years. In 2001, Technicolor was sold to Thomson multimedia for $1.9bn and in 2002 ITV Digital (the renamed ONdigital) collapsed.

=== Acquisition by Granada plc ===
On 7 October 2003, Carlton and Granada finally agreed to merge. While described as a merger, it was essentially a take-over by Granada as its shareholders would own two-thirds of the new company, Charles Allen would become chief executive and Michael Green would leave the company he had built. After the merger, the Granada brand would remain in Granada Television and Granada Productions. In contrast, the Carlton franchises dropped the Carlton name for local programming from the day of the merger (2 February 2004) with the Carlton network production brand disappearing from 1 November 2004; even the London weekday franchise started trading as ITV1 London (Weekdays), and was operationally (though not legally) merged with London Weekend Television as ITV London. The Carlton brand continued being used by Carlton Screen Advertising (and then only in the Republic of Ireland and Northern Ireland) by Dermot Hanrahan and Claude Morgan inc until it was renamed Wide Eye Media in 2014, ending the use of the Carlton name 10 years after the creation of ITV plc.
