= Timeline of overnight broadcasting in the UK =

This is a timeline of overnight television broadcasting in the United Kingdom. It focuses on programming between midnight and 6am and includes details of when channels began into the night and 24-hour broadcasting.

== 1980s ==
- 1983
  - LWT becomes the first station in the UK to begin broadcasting into the night when it launches Nightlife. This sees broadcasting continuing until around 2am on Friday and Saturday nights.
- 1984
  - 4–12 August – For the second week of the 1984 Summer Olympic Games, the BBC extends its live coverage until around 4am, as opposed to ending coverage between 2am to 3am during the first week. Rather than closing down, the BBC fills the gap with Ceefax Olympics AM which provides news from the Games to fill the gap between the end of live coverage and the start of Olympic Breakfast Time.
- 1985
  - No events.
- 1986
  - 2 April – Central launches a Jobfinder service which is shown for one hour after the end of the day's programming. It becomes the first in-vision teletext service to be seen on ITV.
  - 9 August – Yorkshire launches an experimental overnight service, simulcasting the satellite TV channel Music Box. YTV carries Music Box until 6am, and not until the start of TV-am because 6am was when the national breakfast franchise hours began, regardless of whether programmes were actually being broadcast. Therefore, there was a short programming break because in this year, TV-am wasn't starting its day until 6:15am (weekdays) and 6:55am (weekends).
- 1987
  - 3 January – Closedowns reappear on Yorkshire when its experiment with 24-hour television is put on hiatus.
  - 13 January – Yorkshire becomes the second ITV region to launch a Jobfinder service and, like Central, it broadcasts for an hour after closedown.
  - 23 April
    - Channel 4 starts broadcasting into the early hours on Thursdays, Fridays and Saturdays when it launches Nightime. One of the programmes is the discussion show After Dark which was broadcast live and with no scheduled end time.
    - Yorkshire extends broadcasting into the early hours on Thursday, Friday and Saturday nights by introducing a Through Till Three strand.
  - 25 April – Central becomes the first station to keep its transmitters on air all night on a permanent basis when it launches More Central. Programmes are shown until around 3am on weekdays and 4am at the weekend, with the rest of the night filled by its Jobfinder service.
  - 1 June – Thames launches Thames Into the Night, broadcasting until around 4am.
  - 17 August – Thames becomes the first ITV company to launch a full 24-hour service.
  - 28 August
    - LWT and Anglia begin 24-hour transmissions.
    - LWT launches the UK's first overnight show Night Network.
  - 7 December – Tyne Tees begins 24-hour broadcasting. It does so by launching a Jobfinder service which is shown each night from its usual closedown time until the start of TV-am at 6am. Tyne Tees broadcasts Jobfinder in silence, as opposed to other regions which accompany their Jobfinder programme with music.
- 1988
  - 25 January – TVS launches Late Night Late and gradually extends its broadcast hours over the next few months.
  - February – British Medical Television is officially launched, ahead of it commencing broadcasting later in the year as a subscription service during BBC1's overnight closedown period.
  - 15 February
    - Channel 4 starts broadcasting into the early hours every night, closing down between 2am and 3am. Previously, Channel 4 had closed down on Sundays to Wednesdays at between midnight and 1am.
    - An early morning 60-minute news programme, ITN Early Morning News, is launched but it is only available in areas which have 24-hour broadcasting. The first 30 minutes includes a full broadcast of ITN's international news bulletin ITN World News. In addition, brief news summaries are broadcast at various points through the night. The launch coincides with three of the major ITV companies, Scottish, Central and Granada, beginning 24-hour transmissions.
  - 30 May
    - Yorkshire recommences 24-hour broadcasting.
    - TVS and Channel begin 24-hour broadcasting.
  - 22 August – HTV begins 24-hour broadcasting. The service, called Night Club, is broadcast on both HTV West and HTV Wales.
  - 2 September – TSW, Grampian and Border begin 24-hour broadcasting. They carry a new overnight service produced by Granada called Night Time which Granada designs to make it easier for the smaller companies to introduce 24-hour broadcasting. Tyne Tees also takes the service, which replaces its all-night showing of Jobfinder. Regional Jobfinder services are part of Night Time and they are broadcast between 4am and 5am on weeknights.
  - 17 September–2 October – Channel 4 broadcasts all night for the first time to provide full live coverage of the 1988 Olympic Games. BBC1 also provides all-night Games coverage, and consequently broadcasts non-stop for 16 days.
  - 3 October – Ulster begins 24 hour broadcasting. Ulster had planned to commence 24-hour transmissions a month earlier but it was delayed because of a last minute decision to take the overnight service provided by Granada and not that provided by Central. This means that, from this day, all ITV regions now offer a 24-hour service.
  - Autumn – The BBC takes its first tentative steps into later closedowns. Previously, weekday programmes ended no later than 12:15am and weekend broadcasting had finished by 1:30am.
- 1989
  - 6 February – Sky Television launches and one of its channels. Sky News broadcasts a 24-hour service from day one. And for a while, Sky Channel broadcasts teletext pages during its overnight downtime.
  - 31 March – Night Network ends after a little more than 18 months on the air.

== 1990s ==
- 1990
  - 24 January–3 February – As it had done during the 1988 Summer Olympics, BBC1 broadcasts throughout the night to provide live coverage of a major sporting event, this time to cover the 1990 Commonwealth Games in Auckland, New Zealand.
  - 25 March – British Satellite Broadcasting launches. None of its five channels broadcast around the clock but, apart from Now, the channels do broadcast into the early hours. A test card is shown during the channels' downtime.
- 1991
  - late January – The BBC and ITV broadcast extensive live coverage of the Gulf War, both in terms of extended news bulletins and special programmes. All-night coverage is broadcast on both channels during the early stages of the war. ITV broadcasts an all-night news programme and BBC1 broadcasts Pages from Ceefax to keep viewers up to date. This through-the-night coverage had ended by the start of February.
  - 3 March – Following the conclusion of the Gulf War, the ITN Early Morning News is halved in length and now goes on the air at 5:30am. From this day, the ITN World News is no longer broadcast as part of the bulletin.
  - April – LWT and Thames launch a new overnight strand called ITV Night Time.
  - 28 April – HTV closes down its Night Club and replaces it with a simulcast of the overnight generic ITV service from London.
  - 6 May — Sky Movies and The Movie Channel begin broadcasting 24 hours a day. Previously, they had been on air from early afternoon until the early hours of the following morning.
  - August – TVS stops broadcasting their own overnight strand Late Night Late and is replaced by a new ITV Night Time service from London, provided by Thames from Monday to Thursday and LWT from Friday to Sunday. For the first time, both London companies utilised the same on-screen branding throughout the week, the only notable difference being LWT's near non-use of a continuity announcer at the weekend.
  - 1 September – Anglia's Through the Night service ends. It is replaced by the generic overnight service from London which is also broadcast on HTV.
  - October – Scottish rebrands its overnight service as Scottish Night Time and removes the overnight in-vision continuity.
- 1992
  - 21 January – BBC Select launches overnight on BBC Television as an overnight subscription service, showing specialist programmes for professionals including businessmen, lawyers, teachers and nurses. However, the first series, The Way Ahead, made for the Department of Social Security, is distributed free.
  - 5 October – Following the merger of Yorkshire and Tyne Tees, the two ITV companies begin broadcasting the same overnight service called Nightshift.
- 1993
  - 1 January
    - Granada's overnight service begins to be broadcast on Anglia, HTV Wales, HTV West (from 1 January 1993) and on Westcountry which had replaced TSW as ITV's South West of England contractor.
    - The new ITV franchise holder for London weekdays, Carlton introduced a new Nightime service, from Monday–Thursday nights and simulcast by Meridian and Channel Television.
  - 3 January – 3 Nights is launched by LWT as its overnight service. Output includes some of LWT's local programmes.
  - January – On Friday, Saturday and Sunday nights, Meridian and Channel broadcast their own version of Nighttime, presented in-vision from Southampton by ex-Late Night Late presenter Graham Rogers. Both Carlton and Meridian/Channel services utilised the same on-screen branding and presentation throughout the week. Programming largely consists of output from the other services as well as imports including French soap Riviera and in the case of Meridian, regional programming, including World Of Sailing and Freescreen, an experimental series featuring viewers' videos and social action features.
  - 19 January – Schools programmes are shown overnight on BBC2 for the first time as part of a new experiment called Night School. The broadcasts are generally either subject blocks or series blocks.
  - Instead of fully closing down, 4-Tel on View is shown throughout Channel 4's overnight downtime. The teletext pages are accompanied by a continuous tone with music only being played in the final 30-or-so minutes prior to the start of the next day's programmes.
- 1994
  - 19 June – More Central which had been the brand name for Central's overnight broadcasting since it began nighttime transmissions in 1987 ends. It carries Carlton's Nightime service from Monday–Thursday nights and broadcasts its own version of the service on Friday, Saturday and Sunday nights.
  - Yorkshire and Tyne Tees resume local overnight continuity. After two years of sharing transmissions, the schedule and the overnight brand name of Nightshift is retained by both regions.
  - December – The final encrypted BBC Select broadcasts take place although the service will continue broadcasting unencrypted programmes for the next ten months.
- 1995
  - 9 January – Sky One begins 24-hour broadcasting, filling the overnight hours with music videos under the name Hit Mix Long Play.
  - February – Central ends its own nighttime programming and carries the London overnight service, although opt-outs for Jobfinder and other regional programming continues.
  - 13 February – London News Network (a subsidiary of Carlton & LWT) launches a revamped overnight service featuring new neon-themed presentation without any station-specific branding. Following the launch of the LNN service over much of the ITV network, Meridian's overnight service expands to seven days a week and begins transmission in the Anglia region. Overnight continuity links were dropped in favour of announcer-less idents and presentation.
  - 5 June – Granada closes its Night Time service and replaces it with the new national overnight service from London. Consequently, Border, Grampian, UTV, HTV Wales (5 June–31 December 1995), HTV West and Westcountry all take the London service.
  - September – The BBC Select name is used for the final time.
  - 9 October – BBC Learning Zone is launched, broadcasting education programmes all-night Sundays to Thursdays on BBC2. BBC2 continued to close down on Friday and Saturday nights and during the Christmas period when the Learning Zone is not on. It replaces BBC Select and Night School.
  - 16 October – Following the launch of the BBC Learning Zone the previous week, Pages from Ceefax is broadcast in the gaps between the end of regular programmes and the start of Learning Zone broadcasts. This is the first time that Ceefax is broadcast overnight on a regular basis.
- 1996
  - January – Meridian's programming is adopted by HTV and Westcountry, albeit with separate local presentation from HTV's presentation centre in Cardiff.
  - 11 April – Channel 4 trials an overnight sports programme. Airing for six weeks, Nightsports mixes comment and live action from America. This becomes permanent in January 1997 when Channel 4 launches Under the Moon as part of its new 24-hour schedule.
  - September – Meridian revamps and relaunches its overnight service as The Edge. It largely carried the same programmes provided by LNN with some regional opt-outs for programmes such as Meridian's World of Sailing and Freescreen.
- 1997
  - 6 January – Channel 4 starts 24-hour broadcasting, resulting in the end of 4-Tel on View.
  - 30 March – Channel 5 begins broadcasting 24 hours a day from day one, with American sport being shown through the night on weekdays.
  - 9 November – BBC News 24 launches and from that day, instead of closing down, BBC One simulcasts the new news channel throughout the night.
- 1998
  - 14 January – ITV Nightscreen launches as an overnight filler on ITV. Broadcast as teletext pages, the service features news and information about ITV and its programmes.
  - Early in 1998, BBC2 stops shutting down its transmitters when it is not broadcasting the BBC Learning Zone. Instead, they show Pages from Ceefax during all overnight downtime.
  - 19 January – ITV Night Time launches on Tyne Tees and Yorkshire, bringing to an end to their Nightshift after nearly six years.
  - 2 November – SMG relaunches its own overnight programming for its two regions, Scottish and Grampian. The overnight strand is called Nighttime TV.
  - Meridian drops The Edge and replaces it with a set of idents using generic ITV branding. These idents were amended later that year to reflect the change of ITV's generic logo and continued to be used until May 2000, by which time, Meridian had adopted the generic overnight branding used by the rest of the network since November 1999.
- 1999
  - 9 November – ITV Night Time is rolled out to many more ITV regions, including Granada, Border, Central, Tyne Tees, UTV and Yorkshire. At this time, ITV phases out the Night Time logos and presentation on overnight shows by late 1999 with generic network branding taking its place in most regions and ITV Nightscreen starting to take up timeslots towards the end of the night although Central and Yorkshire partially opt out of Nightscreen to show Jobfinder.
  - BBC One starts showing recent programmes with in-vision signing in a slot called Sign Zone. Programmes are broadcast for the first half of the night, with BBC News 24 continuing for the remainder of the night.

== 2000s ==
- 2000
  - May – ITV Night Time begins on Anglia, Channel, HTV Wales, HTV West, Meridian and Westcountry.
- 2001
  - 29 August – Many of the former overnight programmes associated with the old Night Network and Night Time services are replaced with repeats of networked daytime shows (many of these including on-screen BSL signing for the deaf). Scottish and Grampian (both branded overnight as Nighttime TV) continue to run their own overnight schedule.
- 2002
  - No events.
- 2003
  - The pages on ITV Nightscreen transfers from teletext-style pages to a format using Scala Info.
  - Central's overnight opt-outs from ITV Night Time end.
- 2004
  - A reduction in BBC Learning Zone's hours means that more airtime is given over to Pages from Ceefax.
  - Scottish and Grampian (both branded overnight as Nighttime TV) continued to run its own overnight schedule until around late 2004.
- 2005
  - December – ITV begins broadcasting participation quiz programming during much of its overnight hours in the form of Quizmania and later, ITV Play output such as The Mint and Make Your Play.
- 2006
  - No events.
- 2007
  - 23 December – Make Your Play, a remnant from ITV Play, ends, bringing to an end all call participation programming on ITV.
- 2008
  - January – Following the end of its participation programming, ITV Nightscreen is now broadcast for much of the night on ITV.
- 2009
  - No events.

== 2010s ==
- 2010
  - 22 April – Launch of The Nightshift on STV Central. The overnight service launches on STV North on 13 July.
  - ITV launches The Zone, a gaming and shopping programme block, usually from 12:30am to 2:30am.
- 2011
  - 12 April – The Nightshift begins broadcasting separate editions in each of STV's four sub-regional areas.
  - Later in 2011, the sub-regional editions of The Nightshift are axed and are replaced with a single pan-regional edition serving both of the Northern and Central areas, with opt-outs for regional news.
  - Towards the end of 2011, Channel Television's Channel Nightscreen which had consisted of local news headlines and programming information, is axed, finishing shortly after ITV plc had bought the company.
  - December – The Nightshift is reduced from broadcasting nightly to being on the air on four nights a week, on Thursday–Sunday nights.
- 2012
  - 27 April – The Store with JML launches on ITV. It is shown across ITV's late-night two-hour retail teleshopping schedule on Sundays and overnight on ITV4.
  - 22 October – At 5:59am, the final transmission of Pages from Ceefax comes to an end with special continuity announcements and a specially created end caption featuring various Ceefax graphics from over the years.
  - 27 October – Instead of showing pages from the BBC's digital text service during BBC Two's overnight downtime, the channel instead launches This is BBC Two which is a loop of forthcoming BBC Two programmes.
  - 21 December – The final edition of ITV's early morning news programme ITV News at 5:30 is broadcast. Consequently, apart from special events such as election results programmes, there is no longer any overnight news coverage on ITV.
- 2013
  - The overnight showing of recent programmes with in-vision signing moves to BBC Two.
- 2014
  - February – STV's The Nightshift once again becomes a seven-days-a-week programme, but only for four months when in June, it reverts to being shown on four nights each week.
- 2015
  - 1 July – STV's The Nightshift ends its original run. It briefly returns on 27 August but ends again on 1 October.
  - 2 October –After Midnight, a rolling service of regional news and local programming highlights from the STV City channels, launches as STV's replacement overnight slot.
- 2016
  - No events.
- 2017
  - No events.
- 2018
  - No events.
- 2019
  - 1 August – Home shopping channel Ideal World begins simulcasting on ITV during part of the overnight period on ITV.

== 2020s ==
- 2020
  - No events.
- 2021
  - 1 October – ITV Nightscreen is broadcast for the final time, ending after nearly 24 years. It is replaced the following night by Unwind with ITV/Unwind with STV.
- 2022
  - No events.
- 2023
  - 3 July – Home shopping channel Ideal World is dropped by ITV as the channel itself starts to find a buyer. The slot, which had run from just after midnight until 3am, is filled with alternative programming such as Bling and repeats of Winning Combination.
  - 1 December – A home shopping strand returns to the first part of ITV1 overnights when ShopOnTV begins broadcasting for approximately three hours. The strand features presenters from the former Ideal World channel.

== See also ==
- Night Network
- Graveyard slot
