= Night Network =

British network

Night Network, Night Time and Night Shift were names given to the overnight (usually between 12 and 6 am) schedule of the ITV network in the United Kingdom. The first ITV company began 24-hour broadcasting in 1986, with all of the companies broadcasting through the night by the end of 1988. At first, individual companies created their own services; however, before too long, many of the smaller ITV stations began simulcasting or networking services from others.

From this, numerous services began each offering their own distinct take on programmes, with regions taking one of the services on offer. As each franchise was taken over, however, the services became fewer in number. Today, all of the ITV plc regions (except ITV Channel Television and UTV for legal reasons), show teleshopping, followed by repeats of daytime programming and then Unwind with ITV (previously the ITV Nightscreen service was shown until October 2021). STV broadcasts its own strand, Teleshopping and Nightvision.

== History ==
Up until the mid-1980s, all British television stations closed down for the night at around 12:30am, sometimes up to an hour later on Friday and Saturday nights. Some of the ITV companies wanted to expand their broadcasting hours in the belief there was an untapped market for television through the night. As early as 1983, London Weekend Television (LWT) was experimenting with extra hours on Friday and Saturday nights during its Nightlife strand, which pushed back closedown until after 2 am.

And between November 1986 and December 1987, Central and Granada would stay on the air into the night for live world title boxing matches involving Mike Tyson, Sugar Ray Leonard and Thomas Hearns. Thames would also air the coverage when a fight took place on a weekday.

By 1988, Channel 4 had extended late night broadcasting hours and transmission staff for the ITV regional companies were required to play out the network's commercial breaks, even if their station had already closed down. There was also speculation of a threat from the Independent Broadcasting Authority to franchise overnight hours to a new company, as had been the case with breakfast television. Within just over two years of ITV's first overnight experiment (at Yorkshire Television in 1986), the entire network had commenced 24-hour transmission.

=== Early experiments ===
On 9 August 1986, Yorkshire Television became the first ITV company and the first British terrestrial television station to offer 24-hour broadcasting. This was achieved by simulcasting the satellite station Music Box for a three-month trial, as permitted by the IBA. The all-night simulcasts continued until Friday 2 January 1987 – shortly before Music Box ceased operations as a broadcaster. On 13 January 1987, Yorkshire became the second region to launch a teletext-based Jobfinder service for one hour after close-down (Central had launched a Jobfinder service the previous April) with a Through Till Three strand on Thursday, Friday and Saturday nights introduced in April.

On 25 April 1987, Central began extending its programming hours to 3 am on weeknights and 4 am at weekends, airing its own schedule of films, series and hourly Central News bulletins entitled More Central. The station's Jobfinder service (launched a year beforehand) was expanded from a single hour after close-down to fill the remainder of the night until TV-am took over at 6 am. Meanwhile, Granada Television took a more restrictive approach – during 1987, the station introduced a Nightlife strand, which saw programming hours extended until around 3 am on Friday and Saturday nights only. A short-lived joint schedule was introduced by Central, Granada and Scottish Television when the companies began full 24-hour transmission on 13 February 1988, but was abandoned within a few months. During this time, all three stations provided local presentation. Central continued to air its own overnight service until 1994, when it briefly took Carlton's Nightime [sic] service (with opt-outs for regional programming until circa 2003).

In August 1987, Anglia Television, Thames Television and LWT began 24-hour broadcasting. Thames's Into the Night strand began in June 1987 with broadcasts originally running until around 4 am, extending to a full service on Monday 17 August 1987. Anglia originally opted to air Night Network on weekends alongside its own overnight schedule on weeknights while LWT filled the post-Night Network slot with a short-lived Thru to 6 strand. Tyne Tees Television also experimented with 24-hour transmission when in December 1987, it began airing its own teletext Jobfinder service between close-down and 6 am. This continued until Granada's Night Time service launched on Tyne Tees the following September.

TVS, which also aired Night Network at weekends, started its own Late Night Late strand on Monday 25 January 1988, gradually extending its broadcast hours until a full 24-hour service began on 30 May 1988 – the strand was the first to be simulcast on another ITV station, (Channel Television).

HTV Wales and HTV West began broadcasting its own Night Club service on 22 August 1988. Both Late Night Late and Night Club took on a different approach to the practice of in-vision continuity – incorporating viewers' letters, competitions and live studio guests – such features were also used by Thames and Anglia's regional overnight strands.

One constant of all the overnight services, regardless of their differing schedules, was overnight news bulletins provided by ITN, referred to as simply the ITN News Headlines. These were no-frills bulletins, originally proceeded by a variant of the ITN animation of the time set over a dusk sky background (as opposed to the usual light blue); these bulletins would lead into the ITN Morning News, and typically the anchor of that day's edition of the ITN Morning News would also anchor the short updates. The headlines were aired at different times depending on the schedule; both the bulletins and the Morning News debuted on 15 February 1988. Thames also briefly aired editions of CNN Headline News before the ITN World News in 1988.

=== Night Network ===
Night Network was ITV's first overnight programme, beginning on Friday 28 August 1987, originally for the ITV regions covered by LWT, TVS and Anglia, before expanding to other regions during 1988. The programme aired between 1 am and 4 am in the Friday and Saturday night schedules, and between 1 am and 3 am in the Sunday night schedule. On LWT and Anglia, the remaining time until 6am (the start of TV -am programming) was filled by US films and TV series in a strand called Thru To 6.

The show was produced for Night Network Productions and LWT by Jill Sinclair who had been the producer of BBC1's Pop Quiz and Channel 4's The Tube at Tyne Tees Television, aiming for a similar audience to that of these two shows. The format of Night Network was similar to Channel 4's Network 7, or even a late night adult version of Saturday morning kids TV, as it was a mixture of quizzes, celebrity guests, imported serials and bands. Hosting duties rotated but were most frequently undertaken by Paul Thompson and Mick Brown.

Feature segments included Street Cred with Paul Thompson, Video View with Craig Charles, Rowland Rivron in The Bunker Show, Tim Westwood's N-Sign Radio, Emma Freud's chat segment Pillow Talk, Geoffrey Cantor's video segment The Axeman, Barbie Wilde and Gian Sammarco's video reviews for The Small Screen, and quiz show The All New Alpha Bet Show hosted by Nicholas Parsons, whilst Captain Scarlet and the Mysterons, The Partridge Family and Batman were also run, split across each show. Originally, on Sunday nights, recorded music performances were shown but this was only until the programme was expanded to other ITV regions on Friday 2 September 1988.

Although it proved a success, Night Network was never broadcast nationally as Central opted out of the entire programme from the start to provide its own schedule. With more programmes (be it imports, repeats or original output) competing for the overnight slots, the Sunday edition was eventually dropped in autumn 1988. Around the same time, the first hour of Night Network became a regional For London Only segment on LWT while the remaining two hours continued to air across other regions, albeit in differing timeslots depending on the stations' preferred schedules.

Night Network was broadcast for the last time on Friday 31 March 1989.

=== Night Time from Granada ===
On 2 September 1988, four of the smaller ITV companies (Border, Grampian, Tyne Tees and TSW – joined from 3 October 1988 by Ulster – began 24-hour broadcasting with the introduction of Night Time, a part-networked service provided by Granada Television's presentation department in Manchester and intended to help the smaller ITV stations who were unable to provide a service of their own.

This new late night line up consisted mainly of films, and syndicated American shows such as America's Top 10 (presented by Casey Kasem), American Gladiators (the popularity of which prompted LWT to commission their own equivalent series in 1992), WCW Worldwide (which would later be promoted to British wrestling's old Saturday afternoon slot) and Donahue. There was also a limited number of home-produced programming such as Granada's Nightbeat, The Other Side of Midnight (hosted by Factory Records' Tony Wilson), The Hitman and Her (and replacement BPM), Quiz Night, Movies, Games and Videos, Get Stuffed, Stand Up and LWT's Cue the Music.

Traditionally, Grampian would opt out of the overnight networked service by providing its own regional schedule on Hogmanay night into New Year's Day morning - with the exception of 1988 and 1997, as Grampian carried the network schedule through the night as normal after their hogmanay output had finished broadcasting to their region. Respectively, Border Scotland would also carry STV's hogmanay show on a yearly basis too, but didn't provide a regional schedule of their own afterwards, so they too carried the overnight network schedule as normal.

Granada's Night Time service was wound down during 1995 – with programming carried from LNN from January onwards before presentation was handed over to the London service on 5 June.

=== Night Shift from Yorkshire ===
On 29 May 1988, Yorkshire Television reintroduced a full through-the-night service, this time consisting of films, imports, series and networked original programming including YTV's The James Whale Radio Show, simulcast locally with Radio Aire. Following Yorkshire's buyout of Tyne Tees Television in 1992, a new overnight service for both stations was launched entitled Night Shift, broadcast across both regions from YTV's transmission centre in Leeds with pre-recorded continuity from the station's announcing staff. Separate overnight presentation for the YTV and Tyne Tees areas was introduced two years later.

Both regions aired the same schedule of imports, films, local programming and Bollywood movies although for a short while, YTV refused to air more adult programming such as The Good Sex Guide and God's Gift – while such output continued to air on Tyne Tees. The service remained locally originated (despite the introduction of networked idents in 1997) until 18 January 1998. YTV continued to opt out of the network for its regular Jobfinder programme at 5 am until around 2005.

=== ITV Night Time from Thames/LWT ===
During 1991, Anglia, HTV and TVS discontinued their own overnight strands and began carrying a new ITV Night Time service from London, provided by Thames from Monday to Thursday and LWT from Friday to Sunday. For the first time, both London companies utilised the same on-screen branding throughout the week – the only notable difference being LWT's near non-use of a continuity announcer at the weekend.

Around this time, original programming for the network included LWT's Cue the Music, Dial Midnight, ...in Profile, The Big E, Noisy Mothers, One to One, In Bed With Medinner, Night Shift, Get Stuffed and Thames's Video Fashion, albeit airing in differing timeslots depending on each strand's schedule. Imported output increased with featured shows including Night Heat, Soap, Three's Company, The Time Tunnel, Too Close for Comfort, The Equalizer and American sporting programmes.

Following the loss of Thames' franchise on 31 December 1992, Anglia and HTV began taking Granada's Night Time, leaving LWT with its own overnight presentation – the network-branded 3 Nights, which featured some of LWT's local programming.

=== Nightime ===
On 1 January 1993, the new ITV franchise holder for London weekdays, Carlton introduced a new Nightime [sic] service, airing from Monday – Thursday nights and simulcast by Meridian and Channel Television. It was also briefly simulcast by Central between 1994 and 1995.

On Friday, Saturday and Sunday nights, Meridian & Channel broadcast its own version of Nightime, presented in-vision from Southampton by ex-Late Night Late presenter Graham Rogers. Both Carlton and Meridian/Channel services utilised the same on-screen branding and presentation throughout the week. Around this time, programming largely consisted of output airing on the other services as well as imports including French soap Riviera and in the case of Meridian, regional programming, including World of Sailing and Freescreen, an experimental series featuring viewers' videos and social action features.

=== ITV Night Time from LNN ===
From 13 February 1995, London News Network (a subsidiary of Carlton & LWT) launched a revamped overnight service featuring new neon-themed presentation (without any station-specific branding) and a year later, a brand slogan – Television with Attitude. Initially broadcast in London only, the service expanded on 5 June to most of the regions formerly served by Granada's version of Night Time, which had been following the same schedule as LNN's service since the start of the year. Similar to the previous ITV Night Time service from London, live continuity announcements were only made during weekdays. On weekends, the presentation used an automated system of pre-recorded announcements to introduce the programmes.

New original programming was also produced for the network including Bonkers!, Bushell on the Box, Carnal Knowledge, Club@Vision, Cyber Cafe, Cybernet, Curtis Calls, Hotel Babylon, God's Gift, Late and Loud, The Paul Ross Show, Pyjama Party, The Lads and Rockmania. Although less reliant on imports than before, shows including Coach and Box Office America continued to feature within the schedules.

=== NightTime/The Edge from Meridian ===
Following the launch of the LNN service over much of the ITV network, Meridian's overnight service expanded to seven days a week in February 1995 and began airing in the Anglia region. Overnight continuity links were discontinued in favour of announcer-less idents and presentation.

Meridian's programming was also adopted in January 1996 by HTV and Westcountry, who opted to run separate local presentation from HTV's presentation centre in Cardiff. The arrangement continued when Meridian revamped and relaunched the service as The Edge in September 1996. The service largely carried the same programmes provided by LNN with some regional opt-outs for programmes such as Meridian’s World of Sailing and Freescreen.

In 1998, The Edge was dropped and replaced by a set of idents using generic ITV branding. These idents were amended later that year to reflect the change of ITV's generic logo and continued to be used until May 2000, by which time, Meridian had adopted the generic overnight branding used by the rest of the network since November 1999.

=== 1999 – 2000s ===
With 24-hour programming becoming the norm on British television, ITV phased out the Night Time logos and presentation on overnight shows by late 1999 with generic network branding taking its place in most regions and ITV Nightscreen starting to take up timeslots towards the end of the night. From 2001 onwards, many of the former overnight programmes associated with the old Night Network and Night Time services were replaced with repeats of networked daytime shows (many of these including on-screen BSL signing for the deaf). By 2005, the only original Night Time programme still airing was the offbeat cookery show Get Stuffed. Scottish and Grampian (both branded overnight as "Nighttime TV") continued to run its own overnight schedule until around late 2004.

Quiz programming in the form of Quizmania and later, ITV Play output such as The Mint and Make Your Play aired overnight between December 2005 and December 2007.

=== Present ===
All ITV plc regions now carry the same schedule from London. Up until mid-2019, ITV's overnight schedule consisted mainly of repeats of talk and lifestyle shows such as Loose Women and ITV Nightscreen, as well as the roulette strand Jackpot247. STV in Northern & Central Scotland, UTV in Northern Ireland and ITV Channel Television opt out of the overnight schedule regularly for teleshopping, alternative programming and ITV Nightscreen.

STV also continues to provide its own localised presentation overnight – in April 2010, the station introduced The Nightshift, a nightly strand consisting of interactive viewers' chat, local & national news and extracts from current and archived STV programming, linked by live out-of-vision announcers in Glasgow. Initially launched as a pilot in the Central Scotland region, the programme began airing a separate edition for Northern Scotland and later, separate editions for each of STV's four sub-regions. A single pan-regional programme was later broadcast across the STV North and STV Central regions at weekends.

The Nightshift was axed in October 2015 and replaced by After Midnight, a rolling service of regional news and local programming highlights from the STV City channels.

From 1 August 2019, home shopping channel Ideal World began simulcasting during part of the overnight period on ITV, including in the UTV and Channel regions which for legal reasons hadn't been able to carry the prior casino gaming strand in the slot (replacing it with repeated programmes and Nightscreen). STV began simulcasting Ideal World content from September 2021, having previously carried its own separate teleshopping content, After Midnight (until its cancellation following the demise of STV2) and ITV Nightscreen - the latter in some cases for longer than in ITV-branded regions. (Due to schedule opt-outs, on some nights STV will join Ideal at a different point to ITV.) On 1 October 2021 ITV Nightscreen was scrapped and replaced by footage-and-music strand Unwind With ITV (branded as 'Unwind With STV' in STV regions), produced by Rock Oyster Media.

In October 2022, STV launched their own overnight filler programme, called Nightvision in a similar format to the former After Midnight programme, but only contains regional news on a loop throughout the allocated timeslot between roughly 3am and 5am.

In June 2023, the Ideal World strand on ITV1 was discontinued prior to the company's collapse into administration. Following this, the slot was filled with repeats of some of ITV's general entertainment or factual programming, most of which carried on-screen British Sign Language for deaf viewers. On 1 December 2023, ShopOnTV was launched featuring presenters from the former Ideal World channel, which runs for approximately three hours each night until 3am on ITV1.

== Advertising ==
Most of the ITV stations experienced great difficulty in selling advertising slots for the overnight schedules – many companies were not convinced that the low viewing audiences were enough to justify buying airtime. In most cases, stations who were unable to sell advertising overnight simply replaced commercial breaks with public information films or interval captions. Notably, LWT's Thru To 6 service placed animated captions on-screen with music from the week's charts playing in the background. During the 1990s, when advertising space couldn't be sold, an intermission took place between programming, with a message showing simply "Back Soon" and a music track by composer Curtis Schwartz, titled Beat This, playing through.

During the 1990s, commercials for premium-rate phone chat lines and edited versions of infomercials for firms such as Teledisc and Time–Life appeared rather prominently in between regular advertisements. However, by 2003, commercial breaks during overnight programmes became extremely rare, resulting in a block of public information films being shown during the breaks of programmes, many of which were rarely ever seen outside of the early morning hours of television.

Since 2005, overnight commercial breaks on the ITV network consist of programme trailers and promos.

== Regional variations ==
=== Regional services ===
Service	Producer	Years in operation
Thames Into the Night	Thames	1 June 1987 – c. 1991 (24-hour from 17 August 1987, weekdays only)
Thru to 6	LWT	28 August 1987 – Spring 1988 (weekends only)
Anglia Through the Night	Anglia	28 August 1987 – 1 September 1991
More Central	Central	25 April 1987 – 19 June 1994 (Note: Central continued to have its own regional service at the weekends until early 1995.)
Through the Night/Scottish Night Time	Scottish	13 February 1988 – 1 November 1998
Through The Night	Yorkshire	29 May 1988 – 4 October 1992
Night Club	HTV Wales & HTV West	22 August 1988 – 28 April 1991
3 Nights	LWT	2 January 1993 – 12 February 1995 (weekends only)

=== Part-networked services ===
Service	Producer	Years in operation	Regions
Late Night Late	TVS	25 January 1988 – August 1991	TVS; Channel
Night Network	LWT	28 August 1987 – 31 March 1989 (weekends only)	LWT; Channel (in conjunction with Late Night Late); TVS (in conjunction with Late Night Late); Anglia (in conjunction with Anglia Through The Night) (Note: These are the only stations that can be confirmed, using video evidence from TVARK and YouTube, that definitely used the service. Many others used the service in conjunction with their own services.); All other ITV stations except Central from Friday 2 September 1988 onwards
Night Time	Granada	2 September 1988 – 4 June 1995	Granada; Border; Grampian; TSW (partly locally-branded, until 31 December 1992); Tyne Tees (until 4 October 1992); Ulster (from 3 October 1988); Anglia (from 1 January 1993 until 31 December 1994); HTV Wales (from 1 January 1993); HTV West (from 1 January 1993); Westcountry (from 1 January 1993)
ITV Night Time	Thames/LWT	April 1991 – 31 December 1992	Thames/LWT; HTV Wales (from 29 April 1991); HTV West (from 29 April 1991); TVS (from August 1991); Channel (from August 1991); Anglia (from 2 September 1991)
Night Shift	Yorkshire	5 October 1992 – 18 January 1998	Yorkshire (locally branded, from 1994); Tyne Tees (locally branded, from 1994)
Nightime	Carlton/Meridian	1 January 1993 – 9 February 1995	Carlton; Meridian (until 31 December 1994); Channel (until 31 December 1994); Central (from 20 June 1994)
ITV Night Time	London News Network (for Carlton/LWT)	13 February 1995 – 8 November 1999	Carlton; Central (opt-outs until circa 2003); LWT (from 18 February 1995); Grampian (5 June 1995 – 1 November 1998); Border (from 5 June 1995); Granada (from 5 June 1995); UTV (from 5 June 1995); HTV Wales (5 June – 31 December 1995); HTV West (5 June – 31 December 1995); Westcountry (5 June – 31 December 1995); Tyne Tees (from 19 January 1998); Yorkshire (from 19 January 1998)
Night Time (1995–96); The Edge (1996–98); ITV Night Time (1998–2000)	Meridian	January 1995 – May 2000	Meridian; Channel; Anglia; HTV Wales (locally branded, from 1 January 1996); HTV West (locally branded, from 1 January 1996); Westcountry (locally branded, from 1 January 1996)
Nighttime TV	SMG	2 November 1998 – 30 May 2006	Scottish; Grampian
ITV Night Time	Carlton/Granada	9 November 1999 – 2002	Anglia (from May 2000); Channel (from May 2000); Border; Carlton/LWT; Central (opt-outs until circa 2003); Granada; HTV Wales (from May 2000); HTV West (from May 2000); Meridian (from May 2000); Tyne Tees; UTV; Westcountry (from May 2000); Yorkshire

=== Timeline of services ===
NOTE: Area which had Granada Night Time service never changed over to the LNN until June 1995.

ITV regions	1980s			1990s										2000s						
ITV regions	1987	1988	1989	1990	1991	1992	1993	1994	1995	1996	1997	1998	1999	2000	2001	2002	2003	2004	2005	2006
Anglia Television (1959–2004); ITV Anglia (2004–present)	Anglia Through the Night; Anglia				ITV Night Time; Thames / LWT		Night Time; Granada		Night Time; Meridian	The Edge; Meridian		ITV Night Time; Meridian		ITV Night Time; Granada / Carlton			—N/a			
Border Television (1961–2004); ITV Border (2004–present)	—N/a	Night Time; Granada							ITV Night Time; LNN				ITV Night Time; Granada / Carlton				—N/a			
Central Television (1982–2004); ITV Central (2004–present)	More Central; Central							Nightime; Carlton / Meridian	ITV Night Time; LNN				ITV Night Time; Granada / Carlton				—N/a			
Channel Television (1962–2011); ITV Channel Television (2011–present)	—N/a	Late Night Late; Television South			ITV Night Time; Thames / LWT		Nightime; Carlton / Meridian		Night Time; Meridian	The Edge; Meridian		ITV Night Time; Meridian		ITV Night Time; Granada / Carlton			—N/a			
Granada Television (1956–2004); ITV Granada (2004–present)	—N/a	Night Time; Granada							ITV Night Time; LNN				ITV Night Time; Granada / Carlton				—N/a			
Thames Television (1968–1992); Carlton Television (1993–2004); ITV London (2004–present)	Thames Into the Night; Thames				ITV Night Time; Thames / LWT		Nightime; Carlton / Meridian		ITV Night Time; LNN				ITV Night Time; Granada / Carlton				—N/a			
London Weekend Television (1968–2004); ITV London (2004–present)	Thru to 6 LWT		Night Network; LWT		ITV Night Time; Thames / LWT		3 Nights; LWT		ITV Night Time; LNN				ITV Night Time; Granada / Carlton				—N/a			
Television South (1982–1992); Meridian Broadcasting (1993–2004); ITV Meridian (2004–present)	—N/a	Late Night Late; Television South			ITV Night Time; Thames / LWT		Nightime; Carlton / Meridian		Night Time; Meridian	The Edge; Meridian		ITV Night Time; Meridian		ITV Night Time; Granada / Carlton			—N/a			
Tyne Tees Television (1959–2004); ITV Tyne Tees (2004–present)	—N/a	Night Time; Granada				Night Shift; Yorkshire						ITV Night Time; LNN	ITV Night Time; Granada / Carlton				—N/a			
HTV Cymru Wales (1968–2004); ITV Cymru Wales (2004–present)	—N/a	Night Club; HTV			ITV Night Time; Thames / LWT		Night Time; Granada		ITV Night Time; LNN	The Edge; Meridian		ITV Night Time; Meridian		ITV Night Time; Granada / Carlton			—N/a			
HTV West (1968–2004); ITV West (2004–2013)	—N/a	Night Club; HTV			ITV Night Time; Thames / LWT		Night Time; Granada		ITV Night Time; LNN	The Edge; Meridian		ITV Night Time; Meridian		ITV Night Time; Granada / Carlton			—N/a			
Television South West (1982–1992); Westcountry Television (1993–2004); ITV Westcountry (2004–present)	—N/a	Night Time; Granada							ITV Night Time; LNN	The Edge; Meridian		ITV Night Time; Meridian		ITV Night Time; Granada / Carlton			—N/a			
Yorkshire Television (1968–2004); ITV Yorkshire (2004–present)	—N/a	Through The Night; Yorkshire				Night Shift; Yorkshire						ITV Night Time; LNN	ITV Night Time; Granada / Carlton				—N/a			
Grampian Television (1961–2006); STV (2006–present)	—N/a	Night Time; Granada							ITV Night Time; LNN			Nighttime TV; SMG								
Scottish Television (1957–2006); STV (2006–present)	—N/a	Through the Night / Scottish Night Time; Scottish Television										Nighttime TV; SMG								
UTV (1959–present)	—N/a	Night Time; Granada							ITV Night Time; LNN				ITV Night Time; Granada / Carlton				—N/a			
