= Pentelow =

Pentelow is a surname. Notable people with the surname include:

- Arthur Pentelow (1924–1991), English actor
- Kylie Pentelow (born 1979), English journalist and television news presenter
- Nick Pentelow (born 1951), British saxophone player, saxophonist and flautist for the glam rock band Wizzard from 1972 to 1975
