= Bob Crampton =

British journalist at TV presenter

- Born: Witbank, South Africa
- Education: Sutton High School, Plymouth, England
- Occupations: Weather presenter, journalist
- Employer: ITV
- Notable credit(s): The West Tonight; ITV News West Country

Bob Crampton is a British former journalist and TV presenter.

== Early life and education ==
Crampton was born in South Africa. His father was the country's first radio DJ to introduce piano music. At the age of 11, Crampton wanted to become a rugby player. He was educated at Sutton High School in Plymouth.

== Career ==
After leaving Sutton High School, he was employed by a small weekly newspaper in North Devon for a four-year apprenticeship as a reporter.

In 1983, Crampton moved to ITV Wales & West and became a news presenter and reporter. In 2008 he was appointed the weather presenter for The West Tonight.

On 16 February 2009 the ITV News West Country launched, following the merger of The West Tonight with Westcountry Live, Crampton was retained alongside Alex Beresford. After 41 years at ITV, he retired on 29 June 2018.

Year	Title	Role
1997–1981	Westward Diay (Westward Television)	News presenter and reporter
1982–1983	Today South West (Television South West)	News presenter and reporter
1983–2009	The West Tonight (ITV Wales & West)	News/weather presenter and reporter
2009–2018	ITV News West Country (ITV West Country)	Weather presenter
2023–present	Radio Bath	presenter
