= Unwind with ITV =

British ambient television programme

- Title card on ITV1.
- Also known as: Unwind with STV (on STV); Unwind with ITV1; Unwind with ITV2; Unwind with ITV3; Unwind with ITV4; Unwind with ITVBe (until 8 June 2025); Unwind with ITV Quiz (since 10 June 2025)
- Genre: Ambient television; Television filler
- Country of origin: United Kingdom
- Original language: English

Production
- Camera setup: Single-camera
- Running time: 5–75 minutes
- Production company: Rock Oyster Media

Original release
- Network: ITV1, ITV2, ITV3, ITV4, ITVBe (until 2025), ITV Quiz (since 2025)
- Release: 2 October 2021 – present

Related
- ITV Nightscreen; Night Vision (on STV)

Unwind with ITV is an ITV ambient television programme. It broadcasts footage of environments and computer graphics with ambient music. It is produced by Plymouth-based Rock Oyster Media in collaboration with mental health charity Campaign Against Living Miserably, with music from the conglomerate BMG. It started broadcasting on 2 October 2021.

It is shown from 3:50am to 5:05am every night on ITV1 with short airings as little as 5 minutes on ITV 2-4 and ITV Quiz (formerly ITVBe). Select episodes previously broadcast on ITV1 are available on ITVX under the title Unwind with ITV1. Unlike ITV Nightscreen, which presented the TV listings for ITV1 alone across the ITV network, distinct editions of Unwind with ITV air on the same night from channel to channel and are labelled accordingly on ITVX's TV listings.

In November 2022, a round-the-clock feed of Unwind footage was made available as part of the line-up of FAST channels offered within the 'Live TV' section of ITVX. This has since closed. Also in November 2022, Unwind was discontinued on STV and replaced by Night Vision featuring news, sport and weather from across Scotland. In July 2023, Unwind returned to STV following the collapse of Ideal World and was shown alongside Night Vision. Unwind with ITVBe was discontinued with ITVBe's closure and replacement by ITV Quiz on 9 June 2025, with Unwind with ITV now broadcasting on the new channel. Now, Night Vision is broadcast on STV Monday Tuesday and Wednesday nights (Tuesday Wednesday and Thursday morning) from 3:50am to 6am with Unwind broadcasting in Scotland for the rest of the week

== Origins ==
Unwind with ITV replaced ITV Nightscreen, an overnight filler programme promoting upcoming ITV shows, that ran over the late hours of ITV's night-time service and had been broadcast since 1998. The programme cheaply filled the station's overnight downtime as, under ITV's public service broadcasting requirements, ITV1 is required to operate 24 hours a day.

In 2023, Unwind with ITV accounted for 14 per cent of the broadcast hours that ITV1 was required to commission from independent production companies.

== Content ==
Each episode consists of ambient aerial, landscape or natural scenery, or digital graphics, accompanied by soft ambient music.

== Broadcasts ==
Though broadcasts of Unwind with ITV are subject to change to accommodate other programmes, Unwind with ITV1 typically airs overnight between reruns of ITV programming. The other four channels air Unwind with ITV prior to their scheduled teleshopping hours in the early morning. Editions on these channels range from a minimum of 5 minutes to over 30 minutes.

As the death of Prince Philip affected ITV Nightscreen, so the death of Queen Elizabeth II affected Unwind with ITV. Commemorative documentaries aired in place of Unwind with ITV in the days following her death.

== See also ==
- The Landscape Channel – A British defunct television channel that showed landscapes over ambient music
