= ITV (TV network) =

British TV network

ITV Channel 3
- The franchise holders's logos

- Branding: ITV1 STV
- Country: United Kingdom, Isle of Man & Channel Islands
- Headquarters: London, England (ITV); Glasgow, Scotland (STV)

Programming
- Language: English

Ownership
- Owner: ITV plc (13 licences); STV Group (2 licences)

History
- Launched: 22 September 1955; 71 years ago
- Former names: Independent Television (1955–1963)

Links
- Website: itv.com; stv.tv

Availability

Streaming media
- Affiliated streaming service(s): ITVX (England, Wales, Northern Ireland, southern Scotland); STV Player (Central and northern Scotland); Sky Go; Virgin TV Go

ITV is a British free-to-air public broadcast television network. It is branded as ITV1 in most of the UK except for central and northern Scotland, where it is branded as STV. It was launched in 1955 as Independent Television to provide competition to BBC Television (established in 1936). ITV is the oldest commercial network in the UK. Since the passing of the Broadcasting Act 1990, it has been legally known as Channel 3 to distinguish it from the other analogue channels at the time: BBC One, BBC Two and Channel 4.

ITV was, for decades, a network of separate companies that provided regional television services and also shared programmes among themselves to be shown on the entire network. Each franchise was originally owned by a different company. After several mergers, the fifteen regional franchises are now held by two companies: ITV plc, which runs the ITV1 channel, and STV Group, which runs the STV channel.

The ITV network is a separate entity from ITV plc, the company that resulted from the merger of Granada plc and Carlton Communications in 2004. ITV plc holds the Channel 3 broadcasting licences for every region except for central and northern Scotland, which are held by STV Group.

Today, ITV plc simply commissions the network schedule centrally; programmes are made by its own subsidiary ITV Studios and independent production companies. Regional programming remains in news and some current affairs series.

Although the ITV network's history goes back to 1955, many regional franchisees changed over the years. Some of the most important names in the network's past—notably Thames, ABC and ATV—have no connection with the modern network.

== History ==
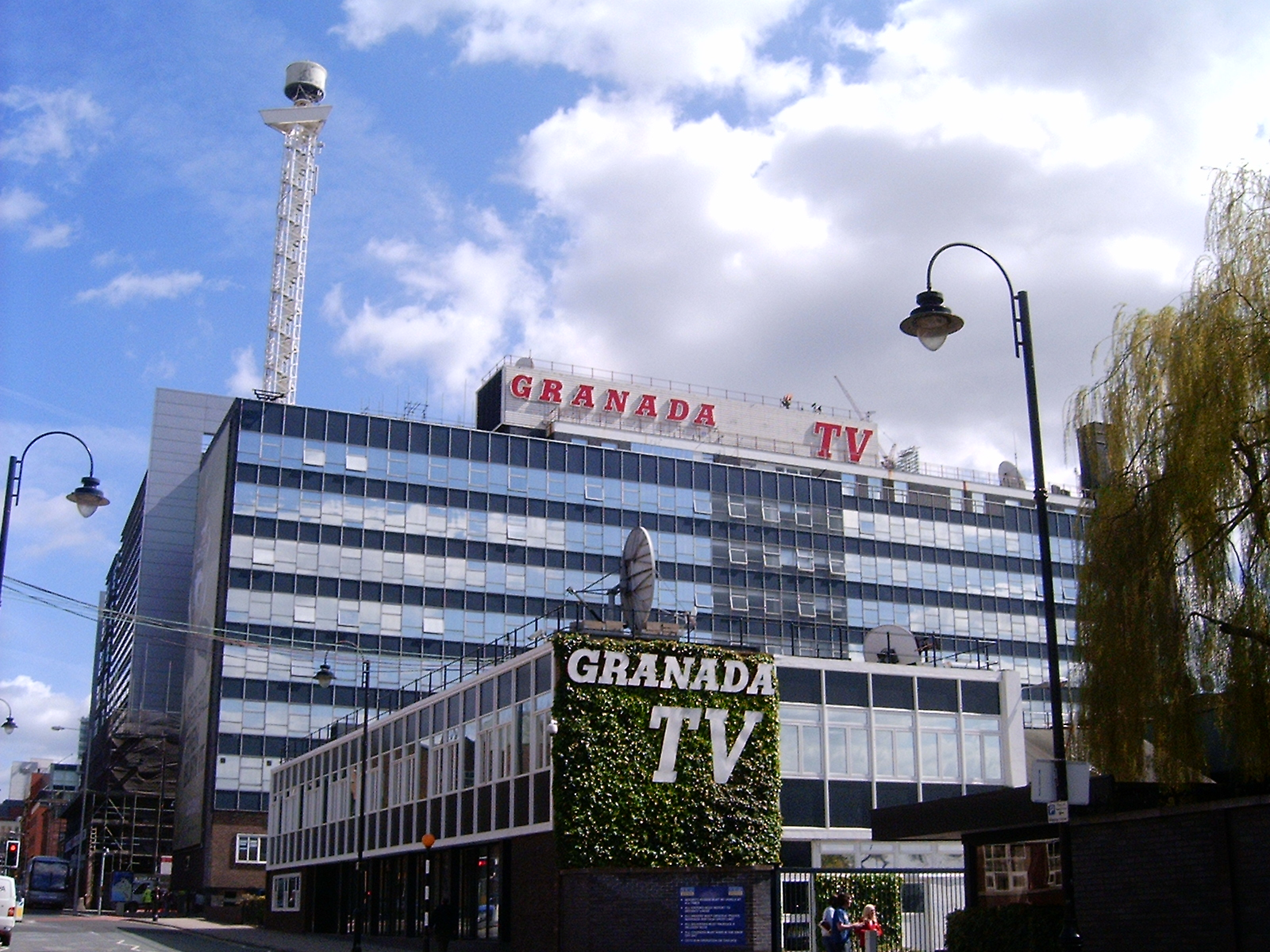
Granada Studios was built in 1954 to house the broadcaster Granada Television. Granada Television opened in 1956 and is the only franchisee to remain an ITV contractor since the creation of the network. The Granada studios closed in 2013.

The ITV network in 1962, after all regional companies had begun broadcasting

The origins of ITV lie in the passing of the Television Act 1954, designed to break the monopoly on television held by the BBC Television Service. The act created the Independent Television Authority (ITA, then IBA after the Sound Broadcasting Act) to heavily regulate the industry and to award franchises. The first six franchises were awarded in 1954 for London, the Midlands and the North of England, with separate franchises for Weekdays and Weekends. The first ITV service to launch was London's Associated-Rediffusion on 22 September 1955, with the Midlands and North services launching in February 1956 and May 1956 respectively. Following these launches, the ITA awarded more franchises until the whole country was covered by fourteen regional stations, all launched by 1962.

The network has been modified several times through franchise reviews that have taken place in 1963, 1967, 1974, 1980 and 1991, during which broadcast regions have changed and service operators have been replaced. Only one service operator has ever been declared bankrupt, WWN in 1963, with all other operators leaving the network as a result of a franchise review. Separate weekend franchises were removed in 1968 (with the exception of London) and over the years more services were added; these included a national breakfast franchise from 1983 onward—operating between 6:00 am and 9:25 am—and a teletext service. The Broadcasting Act 1990 changed the nature of ITV; the then regulator the IBA was replaced with a light-touch regulator, the ITC; companies became able to purchase other ITV regional companies and franchises were now being awarded based upon a highest-bidder auction, with few safeguards in place. This heavily criticised part of the review saw four operators replaced, and the operators facing different annual payments to the Treasury: Central Independent Television, for example, paid only £2,000—despite holding a lucrative and large region—because it was unopposed, while Yorkshire Television paid £37.7 million for a region of the same size and status, owing to heavy competition.

Following the 1993 changes, ITV as a network began to consolidate with several companies doing so to save money by ceasing the duplication of services present when they were all separate companies. By 2004, the ITV network was owned by five companies, of which two, Carlton and Granada, had become major players by owning between them all the franchises in England, Wales, the Scottish borders and the Isle of Man. That same year, the two merged to form ITV plc with the only subsequent acquisitions being the takeover of Channel Television, the Channel Islands franchise, in 2011; and UTV, the franchise for ITV in Northern Ireland, in 2015.

In July 2026, ITV plc agreed to sell its Media and Entertainment division, including its television channels and ITVX, to Sky for up to £1.6 billion, subject to regulatory approval. ITV Studios would remain a separate business.

== Organisation (other networks) ==
The ITV network is not owned or operated by one company, but by a number of licensees, which provide regional services while also broadcasting programmes across the network. Since 2016, the fifteen licences are held by two companies, with the majority held by ITV Broadcasting Limited, part of ITV plc.

The network is regulated by the media regulator Ofcom which is responsible for awarding the broadcast licences. The last major review of the Channel 3 franchises was in 1991, with all operators' licences having been renewed between 1999 and 2002 and again from 2014 without a further contest. While this has been the longest period that the ITV network has gone without a major review of its licence holders, Ofcom announced (following consultation) that it would split the Wales and West licence from 1 January 2014, creating a national licence for Wales and joining the newly separated West region to Westcountry Television, to form a new licence for the enlarged South West of England region.

All companies holding a licence were part of the non-profit body ITV Network Limited, which commissioned and scheduled network programming, with compliance previously handled by ITV plc and Channel Television. However, due to amalgamation of several of these companies since the creation of ITV Network Limited (and given Channel Television is now owned by ITV plc), it has been replaced by an affiliation system. Approved by Ofcom, this results in ITV plc commissioning and funding the network schedule, with STV and UTV paying a fee to broadcast it. All licensees have the right to opt out of network programming (except for the national news bulletins), but, unlike the previous system, will receive no fee refund for doing so. Therefore many do not opt out due to pressures from the parent company or because of limited resources. Prior to the affiliate system being introduced, STV would frequently (and sometimes controversially) opt out of several popular network programmes – such as the original run of the first series of Downton Abbey – citing the need to provide more Scottish content to its viewers.

As a public service broadcaster, the ITV network is obliged to broadcast programming of public importance, including news, current affairs, children's and religious programming as well as party election broadcasts on behalf of the major political parties and political events, such as the Budget. The network also needs to produce accessible output containing subtitles, signing and audio description. In exchange for this programming, the ITV network is available on all platforms free to air and can be found at the top of the EPG of all providers.

Since the launch of the platform in 1998, all of the ITV licensees have received gifted capacity on the digital terrestrial television platform. At present, the companies are able to broadcast additional channels and all choose to broadcast the ITV plc owned ITV2, ITV3, ITV4 and ITV Quiz in their region. UTV and STV (formerly Scottish Television and Grampian Television) previously broadcast their own services – UTV2 in Northern Ireland and S2 in central and northern Scotland – until 2002, when they adopted the ITV plc channels. Despite this, STV was given a broadcasting licence for what would become the STV2 channel in 2013, however this was short-lived and the channel closed in 2018. The broadcasters all make use of the Digital 3&4 multiplex, shared with Channel 4. CITV launched in March 2006 (closed September 2023). ITV Encore launched in June 2014 (closed May 2018) and ITVBe launched in October 2014. ITV Box Office launched in February 2017 (closed January 2020).

On 13 September 2022, ITV confirmed that during the day of Monday 19 September, the day of the state funeral for Queen Elizabeth II, all programming schedules on ITV's digital channels would be scrapped, with the main ITV News coverage being shown live and uninterrupted on every channel. This was the first time ITV decided to do this, with the company keeping their digital channels' schedules mostly as advertised in the run up to the funeral (with a few amendments for cancelled sporting events on ITV4) and all royal coverage being on their main channel.

In November 2025, ITV said it was in "preliminary" discussions to sell its broadcasting business to Sky UK. On 6 July 2026, Sky announced it would acquire, subject to regulatory approval, ITV's broadcasting networks and streaming services for £1.6bn, a deal that does not include production unit ITV Studios, which would become a standalone company. Should the deal be completed, ITV would join Sky under the corporate umbrella of NBCUniversal, whose U.S. parent Comcast is planning to spin off into its own separate entity.

=== ITV plc ===
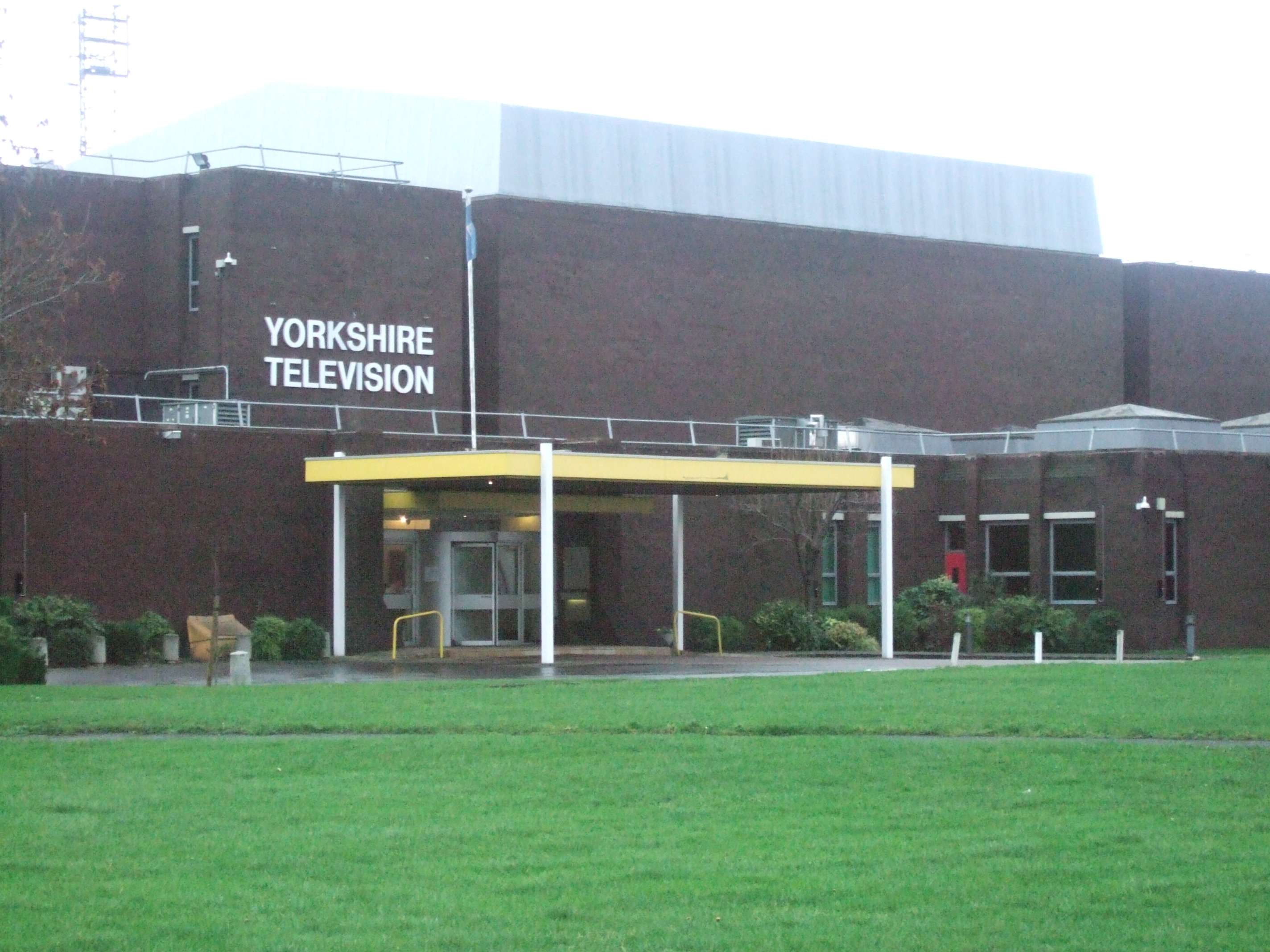
The Leeds Studios, used by ITV Yorkshire. Each ITV region originally had its own studios, however the rise of publisher-broadcasters like Carlton Television and the takeover of regions caused several studios to be closed.

ITV plc owns thirteen of the fifteen franchises and broadcasts to England, Wales, southern Scotland, the Isle of Man, the Channel Islands and Northern Ireland through its subsidiary company ITV Broadcasting Limited. The company also owns the breakfast television licence, which as of January 2020, broadcasts across the network between 6:00 and 10:00am each morning using the Good Morning Britain (previously Daybreak) and Lorraine names. The company broadcasts a centralised service under the ITV1 brand. In Northern Ireland, ITV used the UTV brand name as the name of the channel until April 2020.

The group also owns ITV Studios, the production arm of the company and formed from an amalgamation of all the production departments of the regional licences they own. The company produces a large proportion of ITV's networked programming (around 47%, but previously as high as 66% according to some reports), with the rest coming primarily from independent suppliers (under the Broadcasting Act 1990, at least 25% of ITV's total output must be from independent companies). ITV plc hopes to increase the amount of in-house programming to as close to the 75% limit as possible.

The group cut the number of regional news programmes offered from 17 in 2007 to 9 by 2009, resulting several regions being merged to form one programme, including the Border and Tyne Tees regions, the Westcountry and West regions and the removal of sub regional programming, with some regions only represented by pre-recorded segments. Sub-regions were restored in 2013.

=== STV Group ===
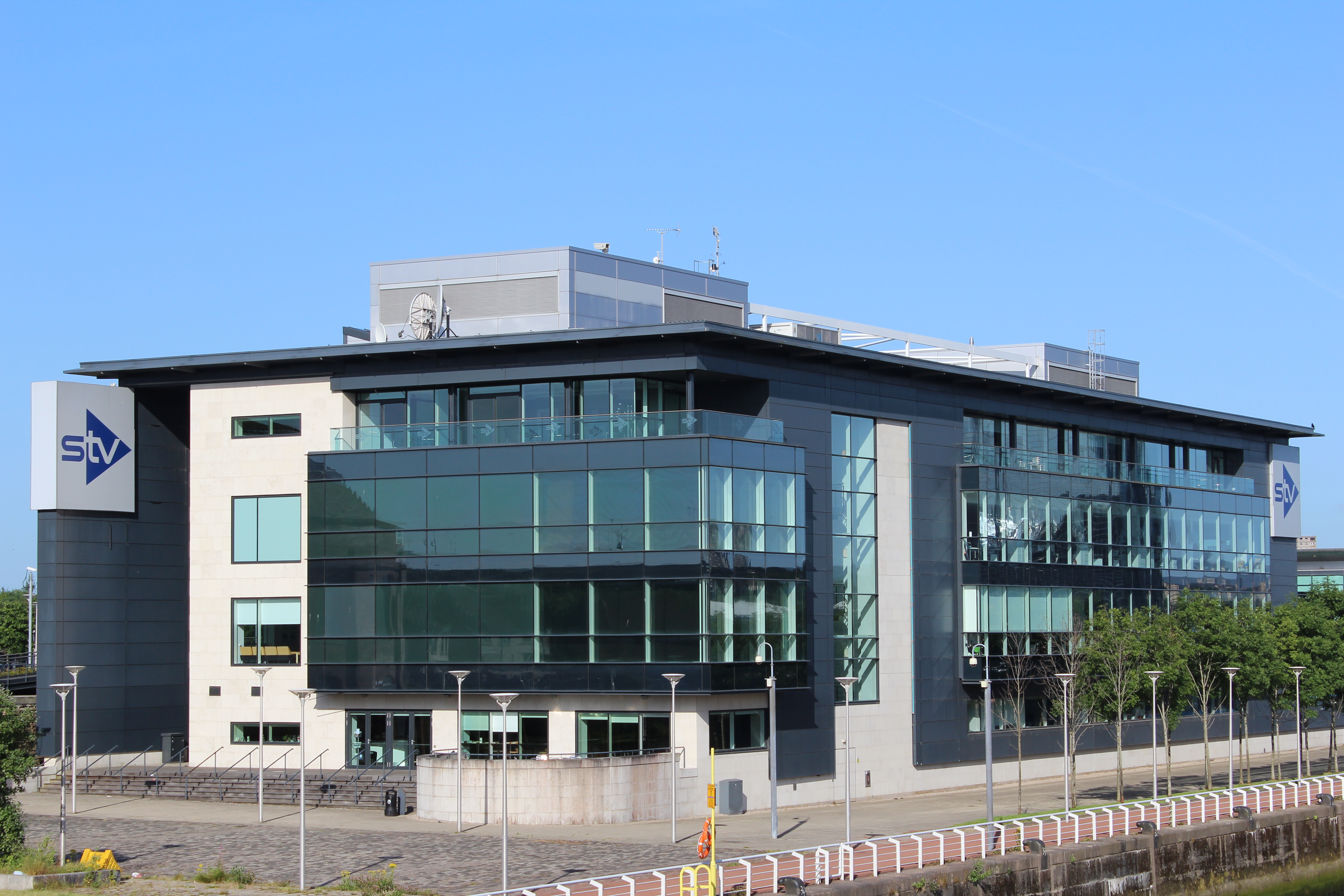
HQ and studios of STV in Glasgow

STV Group plc owns two franchises, covering central and northern Scotland, through subsidiary companies STV Central and STV North, broadcasting a central service under the STV brand.

The company had several disputes with ITV plc in the late 2000s and early 2010s over network programming. STV aimed to broadcast more Scottish programmes at peak times and so removed several key ITV plc programmes from their schedule in July 2009 including The Bill, Midsomer Murders and Lewis. Despite STV's explanation of expense, ITV plc were angered by the decision, as a recent schedule change had made The Bill central to their programming, and broadcast the programmes on ITV3 as well to ensure Scottish viewers could see the programmes. On 23 September ITV plc was reported to be in the process of suing STV for £20 million, as ITV felt dropping the shows constituted a breach of network agreements; STV subsequently counter-sued ITV plc for £35 million.

The dispute was ended in 2011 with STV agreeing to pay ITV plc £18 million. The signing of the new affiliation deal has resulted in STV paying a flat fee for all networked programming, and so to drop any programmes is unlikely due to the large costs involved.

== Current licensees ==
On-air branding of the ITV network regions 2013–2022. Since then, ITV has rebranded as ITV1.

The fully ITV-branded franchises since 2014

There are fifteen regional licences, covering fourteen regions (there are separate weekday and weekend licences for the London region), and one national licence for the breakfast service. All licences listed here were renewed until the end of 2024. Licences in England and Wales were held by the individual regional ITV plc owned companies prior to November 2008.

The appointment to provide national news for ITV (TV Network) is also subject to approval by Ofcom. This appointment has been held by ITN since the channel's inception, and has also been approved through the end of 2024.

Regional ITV licenses
Licence service area	Licence holder	Licence held since	Parent company	Service name	On air name
Central Scotland	STV Central Limited	31 August 1957	STV Group plc	STV Central	STV
North of Scotland	STV North Limited	30 September 1961	STV Group plc	STV North	STV
East of England	ITV Broadcasting Limited	December 2006 (Note: "Anglia Television Limited", which had provided the service since 1959, had its name changed to "ITV Broadcasting Limited" on 29 December 2006.)	ITV plc	ITV Anglia	ITV1
England–Scotland Border	ITV Broadcasting Limited	November 2008	ITV plc	ITV Border	ITV1
East, West and South Midlands (Note: Up to 1968, the service for the Midlands region was provided by ATV for Monday to Friday and by ABC Weekend for weekends.) (Note: The Oxford area was transferred from the Central to the Meridian licence on 1 January 2014)	ITV Broadcasting Limited	November 2008	ITV plc	ITV Central	ITV1
Wales (Note: Wales and West of England until 31 December 2013)	ITV Broadcasting Limited	November 2008	ITV plc	ITV Cymru Wales	ITV1 Cymru Wales (Note: Usually just ITV1.)
North West England (Note: Up to 1968, the service for a single Northern area consisting of both the current North West region and most of the current Yorkshire region was provided by Granada Television for Monday to Friday and by ABC Weekend for weekends.) and Isle of Man (Note: Coverage was transferred from ITV Border and Tyne Tees to ITV Granada following DSO in the Isle of Man in July 2009.)	ITV Broadcasting Limited	November 2008	ITV plc	ITV Granada	ITV1
London (weekdays)	ITV Broadcasting Limited	November 2008	ITV plc	ITV London (weekdays)	ITV1
London (weekends)	ITV Broadcasting Limited	November 2008	ITV plc	ITV London (weekends)	ITV1
South and South East England	ITV Broadcasting Limited	November 2008	ITV plc	ITV Meridian	ITV1
North East England	ITV Broadcasting Limited	November 2008	ITV plc	ITV Tyne Tees	ITV1
South West and West of England (Note: South West of England only until 31 December 2013)	ITV Broadcasting Limited	November 2008	ITV plc	ITV West Country	ITV1
Yorkshire and Lincolnshire	ITV Broadcasting Limited	November 2008	ITV plc	ITV Yorkshire	ITV1
Channel Islands	ITV Broadcasting Limited	March 2017	ITV plc	ITV Channel TV	ITV1 (Note: Since 2013 all presentation has only carried the ITV/ITV1 name, however the name ITV Channel Television was previously used on-screen.)
Northern Ireland	ITV Broadcasting Limited	February 2016	ITV plc	UTV	ITV1 (UTV) (Note: Despite UTV permanently adopting ITV/ITV1 continuity in November 2020, the UTV brand is still used for local programming.)

National ITV license
Licence service area	Licence holder	Licence held since	Parent company	Service name	On air name
National breakfast time (Note: The current breakfast holder, ITV Breakfast Ltd, is a rebrand of GMTV, which took over from the previous incumbent, TV-am in 1993.)	ITV Breakfast Limited	1993	ITV plc (Note: ITV plc purchased the remaining stake of GMTV (now ITV Breakfast) from The Walt Disney Company in November 2009.)	Good Morning Britain	ITV1

== Programming ==
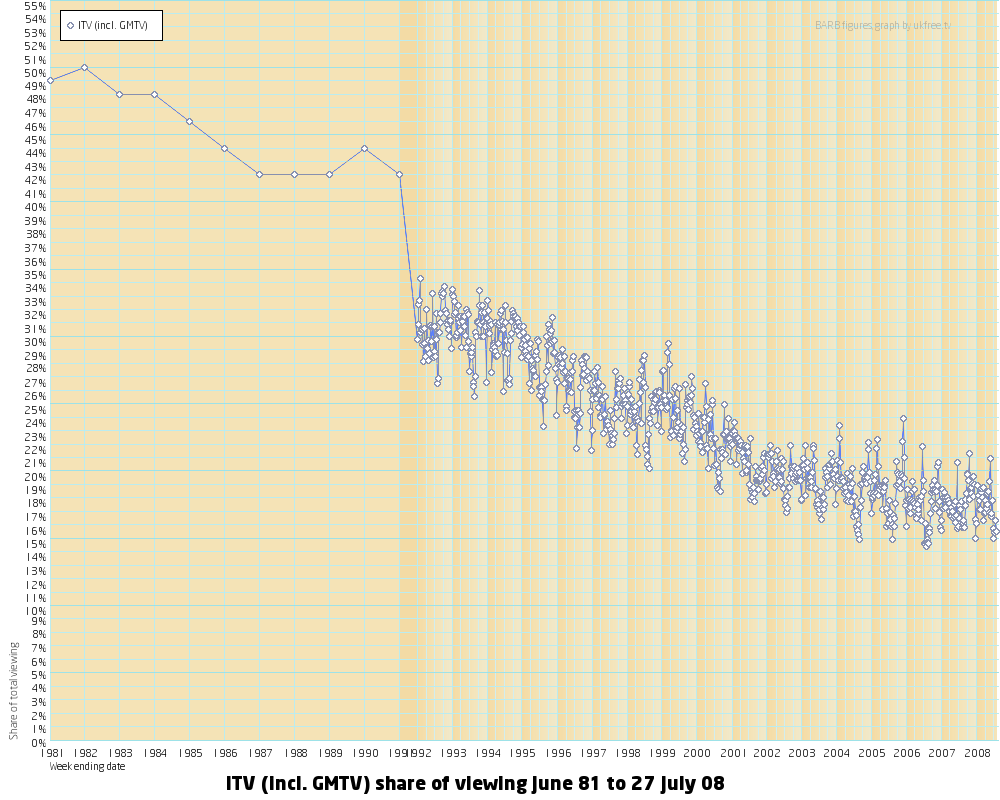
ITV share of viewing 1981–2008 Broadcasters' Audience Research Board figures

Despite the immense popularity of ITV programming, following legislation in the Broadcasting Act 1990 imposing a 25% quota for commissioning of independent productions, the number of programmes from independent production companies not connected to the traditional ITV network has increased rapidly. Notable examples include Talkback Thames (one half of which, Thames Television, was itself a former ITV franchisee), producers of The Bill and co-producers of The X Factor, and 2waytraffic, producers of Who Wants to Be a Millionaire?.

From the late 1990s, ITV's long-standing commitment to strong current affairs and documentary programming began to diminish with the ending of productions such as World in Action (Granada Television), This Week (Rediffusion London/Thames Television), First Tuesday (Yorkshire Television), Network First, Survival (Anglia Television), and Weekend World (LWT) and their replacement with populist shows such as Tonight. News at Ten was also axed in 1999, although it was reinstated in 2001. In December 2009, the final edition of ITV's long-running arts programme, The South Bank Show was broadcast.

ITV's primetime schedules are dominated by its two soap operas: Coronation Street and Emmerdale. At the start of the 21st century, ITV faced criticism for including a large amount of "reality TV" programmes in the schedule, such as Celebrity Fit Club, Celebrity Wrestling and Celebrity Love Island. In its defence, ITV does continue to show its major strengths in the fields of sports coverage and drama productions, and it continues to schedule national news in primetime.

=== Breakfast ===
Breakfast television programmes have been broadcast on ITV since 1 February 1983. It was initially run by an independent contractor - TV-am, and later GMTV - until GMTV Limited became a wholly owned subsidiary of ITV plc in November 2009.

Historically, ITV aired breakfast programmes from 6am until 9.25am but ITV extended this to 10am on weekdays on 6 January 2020. and now broadcasts two breakfast programmes on weekdays - Good Morning Britain and Lorraine. Good Morning Britain keeps viewers up to date with all the latest news, sports, features and weather, whilst Lorraine predominantly focuses on celebrity interviews, recipes, fashion and showbiz. Until 27 August 2023, the service would show a simulcast of the CITV channel, but since that service has closed, a mix of repeated programming is shown whilst the CITV service that still exist broadcasts at breakfast time on ITV2 (which has the CITV block), ITV3, ITV4 and ITVBe from 7am show other repeats some of which provide a sign language service within the broadcast as part of its quota and licence requirements.

=== Daytime programming ===
ITV's strong daytime line-up helped by programmes such as This Morning, Loose Women, Dickinson's Real Deal and game shows Tipping Point and The Chase are very popular, achieving the highest audience share during the daytime slot.

=== Entertainment ===
In recent years the network has tried to use formats that ITV Studios own outright (whether they have originated in the UK with their Lifted Entertainment company or have come from production companies they own abroad), though some popular programme formats like The Masked Singer have still been acquired from other companies abroad. Currently ITV are behind the formats for Dancing on Ice, The Voice UK (the format originally coming from their Dutch production company) and I'm a Celebrity...Get Me Out of Here!, while forthcoming music game show Walk The Line has been co-developed by Simon Cowell's Syco Entertainment and ITV.

=== National and international news ===
Since the network started, Independent Television News Limited (ITN) has held the contract to produce news for the ITV network, with 30-minute national news bulletins currently broadcast at 1:30 pm, and 10:00 pm, and an hour-long bulletin at 6.30pm. These bulletins were broadcast under the ITN brand from 1955 until 1999, when a new network identity reinforced the ITV brand, resulting in the new bulletins being broadcast under the ITV News brand.

ITN has long been respected in the news industry as a source of reliable information and news, and as a result the service has won many awards for their programmes, the latest being in May 2011 when News at Ten was named best news programme by the Royal Television Society and BAFTA.

==== Weather ====
The ITV National Weather forecast was first broadcast in 1989, using data supplied by the Met Office, and was presented by a number of weather forecasters. The forecasts are sponsored with the sponsor's message appearing before and after the forecast. The forecasts are made immediately after the main national news bulletins.

Prior to the creation of the national forecast, each regional company provided its own regional forecast. The regional forecasts today are incorporated into the main regional news bulletins, and in the summer months, includes a pollen count.

=== Late-night programming ===
Currently only new episodes of long-form news and current affairs programmes like Exposure, Peston and On Assignment are being scheduled after News at Ten. The channel broadcasts a partnership teleshopping service overnight, replacing gambling broadcasts: the time between the news and the shopping is usually kept for re-runs, with ITV repeating its primetime entertainment shows, films, or sports programming from ITV4.

Also aired overnight are repeats, many of which have on-screen BSL signing for the deaf community. Replacing the information-based ITV Nightscreen slot in 2021 was Unwind With ITV, programming produced in association with the Campaign Against Living Miserably. This mindfulness programme shows calming shots of natural landscapes and relaxing animations, with versions of the footage also seen on ITV2, ITV3 and ITV4.

On some occasions the schedule is varied, for example a live event overnight, such as the Super Bowl or the Oscars.

This overnight programme service is very different to what used to be shown on the network in the years after 24-hour broadcasting was introduced - this included new entertainment, imports, sports and other information programmes, and, in some regions, a job finder service.

=== Regional programming ===
The regional ITV companies are required to provide local news as part of their franchise agreement together with local weather forecasts, with the main local bulletin at 6pm and regional bulletins located after each national news programme. In addition to this, traditionally ITV companies would provide other regional programming based on current affairs, entertainment or drama. However, apart from a monthly political programme, most non-news regional programming in the English regions was dropped by ITV plc in 2009, although it continues in Wales and the Channel Islands, as well as on STV and UTV and ITV Border in Scotland from 2014 to cover mainly Scottish politics whilst ITV Border in England broadcast network programming . On 14 January 2013, ITV plc regional news programmes titles were discontinued in favour of more generic branding under the ITV News title with the region listed as the subheading. However some "heritage" brand names were retained including Calendar, Granada Reports and Lookaround. On 28 June 2014, ITV News Cymru Wales returned to its historic name of Wales at Six.

==== Current regional news programmes ====
ITV News and STV News regions and sub-regions since 2013

1. Anglia: ITV News Anglia (with East and West variations)
2. Border: ITV News Lookaround (although with a Scotland non-news opt out)
3. Central: ITV News Central (with East and West variations)
4. Channel: ITV News Channel TV
5. Granada: ITV News Granada Reports
6. London: ITV News London
7. Meridian: ITV News Meridian (with South variation and a Thames Valley opt-out and South East variation)
8. STV Central: STV News (non-ITV plc) (with East and West variations)
9. STV North: STV News (non-ITV plc) (with a Dundee opt-out)
10. Tyne Tees: ITV News Tyne Tees
11. UTV: UTV Live
12. Wales: ITV News Wales at Six
13. West Country: ITV News West Country (with West and South West variations)
14. Yorkshire: ITV News Calendar (with East and West variations)

==== Former programmes ====
- ATV: ATV Midlands News, ATV Today
- Anglia: About Anglia, Anglia News, Anglia News Tonight, Anglia Tonight
- Carlton: London Tonight
- Central / Carlton (Central): Central News, Central News at Six, Central Tonight
- Channel: Channel Report
- Grampian: North Tonight
- Granada: Northern Newscast, Scene at Six Thirty, Granada Tonight
- HTV Wales / ITV Wales: Report Wales/Y Dydd, Wales Tonight, HTV News, ITV Wales News
- HTV West / ITV West: Report West, HTV News, The West Tonight, ITV West News, West Country Tonight
- London Weekend Television / LWT: LWT News, London Tonight
- Meridian: Meridian Tonight
- Scottish Television / STV: Scotland Today
- Southern: Day by Day / Scene South East (Dover Transmitter)
- Television South West / TSW: Today South West, TSW Today
- Television South / TVS: Coast to Coast
- Thames: Thames News
- Thames Valley (Non-Franchise): Thames Valley Tonight
- Tyne Tees: Today At Six, Northern Life, Tyne Tees Today / Network North (Bilsdale Transmitter), North East Tonight
- Ulster Television / UTV: Good Evening Ulster, Six Tonight
- Westward: Westward Diary
- Westcountry / Carlton (Westcountry): Westcountry Live

=== Sports ===
- Football
  - ITV holds joint rights for the FIFA World Cup and the UEFA European Championship with the BBC and has shown every World Cup live since 1966, on a shared basis with the BBC. This arrangement has been in place since the 1960s. ITV shares the rights for the FA Cup with the BBC, having previously done so from 1955 to 1988. ITV also held the live rights to the competition from 1998 to 2001 and from 2008 until 2014. The 24/25 season also added the Carabao Cup to its portfolio broadcasting both semi finals with the first leg of one and the second leg of the other and the final sharing the broadcasting rights with Sky Sports.
- Horse racing
  - ITV other flagship sporting coverage is as the exclusive free to air home of British horse racing. ITV's deal, which began on 1 January 2017, encompasses horse racing every Saturday afternoon on ITV or ITV4.
- Boxing
  - ITV Sport has broadcast many boxing matches over the years under the Big Fight Live banner and the sport was a regular fixture on ITV screens until the mid 1990s when ITV lost its two premier contracts to Sky Sports In 2005, ITV returned to the ring when it reached an agreement to broadcast the main share of Frank Warren's Sports Network fights. This continued until 2008, and in 2010 ITV decided to stop covering the sport as ITV thought that boxing was no longer commercially viable. In the late 2010s ITV showed some boxing on a pay-per-view channel ITV Box Office. However ITV's boxing coverage is now restricted to Premier Boxing Champions which it shows on ITV4, having closed ITV Box Office at the start of 2020.
- Cycling
  - ITV has shown the Tour de France in 2002. Initially, live coverage was only broadcast at the weekend but since the 2010 Tour de France, ITV4 has broadcast daily live coverage of every stage. ITV also broadcasts the Tour of Britain Women and Tour of Britain Men live.
- Darts
  - ITV4 covers six tournaments each year, including the UK Open, The Masters and the World Series of Darts. ITV had previously extensively covered the sport and did so from 1972 until it decided to drop the sport in 1988. ITV resumed coverage of darts in 2007 and since then it has gradually increased the number of events it shows.
- Motorsport
  - ITV's flagship motorsport coverage is of the British Touring Car Championship and has shown the event in full since 2002. ITV also broadcasts highlights of the World Superbike Championship and the British Superbike Championship. ITV had previously covered Formula One and did so for 12 seasons, from 1997 to 2008.
- Rugby
  - ITV has broadcast every Rugby World Cup live since 1991. ITV also broadcasts the Women's Rugby World Cup and the Under 20 World Cup. Since 2016, ITV has shared coverage of the Six Nations Championship with the BBC. ITV broadcasts all England, France Ireland and Italy home matches live, while BBC shows all Scotland and Wales home matches live. ITV also shows 7 live matches from Premiership Rugby including the final and a weekly highlights show on ITV4 on Sunday evenings, repeated later on ITV1.
- Snooker
  - Snooker is another sport which ITV dropped but has subsequently restarted showing. In the 1980s and early 1990s, ITV broadcast four tournaments per season. ITV dropped snooker after the 1993 British Open and the sport was mostly absent from ITV screens until the 2010s. In summer 2014 ITV and Barry Hearn announced they had signed a 5-year deal to cover 2 Snooker Tournaments per year, keeping coverage of the Champion of Champions and a new tournament called the World Grand Prix. ITV now shows four tournaments each year, including the Champion of Champions and the World Grand Prix.

=== Children's programming ===
The network broadcasts children's programming under the CITV (Children's ITV) strand. Children's programming was originally provided during weekday afternoons and weekend mornings, however following the launch of the CITV channel in 2006, all children's programming, with the exception of the weekend ITV Breakfast slot, were relocated from the ITV line-up to the CITV channel in 2007, a move which was challenged by Ofcom in April 2007. In 2023, ITV announced that CITV would cease broadcasting as a linear channel, and would be replaced by ITVX Kids, a streaming media service which launched in July 2023. The CITV channel closed on 1 September 2023, with a dedicated CITV programming block now broadcasting on ITV2 every morning, from 2 September 2023.

=== Schools programming ===
Schools programming on the network began in 1957 in some regions and expanded as more regions began broadcasting. It was a contractual obligation for some ITV companies to broadcast schools programming, and this was initially broadcast as part of the normal scheduling. The programmes were moved into a segment for broadcast during the day in the 1960s, under the banner Independent Television for Schools and Colleges and from 1987 were broadcast on Channel 4 in the ITV Schools on Channel 4 segment. In 1993, this segment became Channel 4 Schools and later in 2000 4Learning. These strands of programming consisted of schools programming from all the ITV companies or from independent sources. The schools strand itself is now defunct, with no particular branding segment used.

=== Acquired programming ===
ITV was originally very reliant on broadcasting American series, with westerns such as Gunsmoke and Rawhide in particular being considerable successes for the network during its earlier years. Action drama The Fugitive and sci-fi anthology The Twilight Zone were also broadcast by various regions in the early 1960s, with Batman and I Dream of Jeannie shown later on in the decade. Due to the varying schedules of many ITV regions, acquired content was not broadcast by some franchises.

By the 1970s, most ITV regions were airing the likes of Hawaii Five-O, Happy Days, and The Brady Bunch. 1972 also saw the beginning of ITV's daytime programmes at lunchtime, a slot that would become associated with the many Australian soap operas that were broadcast in the newly expanded schedule, including The Sullivans and The Young Doctors. By the 1980s, more were added to the schedule, such as Sons and Daughters and A Country Practice.

In primetime by the 1980s, ITV was broadcasting the likes of Hill Street Blues (which ITV began showing just one week after its debut on NBC in the United States) and L.A. Law. It was also early in the decade when Australian evening soap opera Prisoner: Cell Block H was bought by ITV, and was broadcast after News at Ten.

By 1982, Channel 4 had launched, and despite originally being related to ITV, it competed against its parent network to screen popular American programmes such as St. Elsewhere and Cheers, although the latter did receive a single ITV broadcast as part of a night showcasing Channel 4 programmes. Both Hill Street Blues and L.A. Law had moved from ITV to Channel 4 by the end of their runs.

A heavy emphasis on action, fantasy and science fiction series was also placed by ITV during the 1980s, with The A-Team, Buck Rogers in the 25th Century, and Airwolf being broadcast by the network, as well as the likes of Baywatch and SeaQuest DSV by the 1990s. ITV also picked up a glut of older-skewing CBS dramas through that period, including Murder, She Wrote and Dr. Quinn, Medicine Woman.

In February 1989, in tandem with the network launching its national weather forecast, and as part of a new early evening lineup which involved the shortening of Children's ITV, Australian soap Home and Away was acquired by ITV, particularly to compete with the success of rival Australian soap opera Neighbours on BBC One. ITV also broadcast Beverly Hills, 90210 beginning in early 1991, in the same Saturday teatime slot that Baywatch had occupied, although some episodes were broadcast in later time slots. It moved to Sky One beginning with the third season.

ITV reshuffled its daytime schedules in the autumn of 1993, and just a few months prior, Central began broadcasting the New Zealand soap opera Shortland Street. The revamp saw more ITV companies pick it up, with Scottish Television the only region to reject the series outright. Central also broadcast the Australian soap opera Echo Point around the same time, although no other franchises picked it up. ITV also aired a considerable amount of syndicated unscripted US programmes in daytime during the 90s, such as Judge Judy and The Jerry Springer Show.

By 1996, ITV had been quiet with US series in primetime, particularly as Channel 4 and Sky One increased the competition for securing the most popular US dramas and sitcoms. However, that summer, ITV debuted the primetime soap Savannah, in a 9pm Friday slot. It was a considerable success for ITV's standards, and it became the highest rated new American series of that year. Despite this success, ITV moved the show for its second season, no longer networking the series and moving to late night slots.

ITV tried again at broadcasting an American drama series in September 1997, with the ABC legal drama The Practice, which ran in the same slot that Savannah had the year prior. It saw nowhere near the same levels of success, and was dropped by the network after just three episodes. It later resurfaced in late night before moving to BBC One in 2000.

ITV attempted launching a Monday night block for American sitcoms in the post-News at Ten slot in the autumn of 1998, with Veronica's Closet (which ITV beat Channel 4 for the rights to) followed by Dharma & Greg. After this failed to catch much steam, ITV all but pulled out from showing American programmes on the main network by the end of the decade, and it would prove to be the final time ITV aired US comedy on the main network.

ITV made attempts during the mid 2000s to poach proven popular US shows such as the mystery comedy-drama Desperate Housewives and medical drama House from Channel 4 and Five, respectively, but both shows ended up remaining on their incumbent rights holders. ITV were reportedly also interested in 2004 about acquiring the Friends spin-off Joey but later denied such interest, and in 2007 were close to picking up Neighbours after the BBC declined to continue broadcasting it, although Five eventually won the rights to both programmes.

ITV returned to US programming in 2006, acquiring Six Degrees. Initially it had been planned to air in a primetime slot in 2007, but ended up being shown in late nights in 2008. This could be due to the show being cancelled after its first season by original network ABC due to low ratings, despite high expectations and its slot following top-10 hit Grey's Anatomy. It was also around this time that Supernatural and Dexter, which ITV2 & ITV4 aired respectively, were given late night repeats on ITV1.

The following year, ITV acquired another US programme, fellow ABC series Pushing Daisies. It debuted in 2008 in a Saturday evening slot and initially did well garnering 5.7 million viewers, although there were fan complaints when ITV chose to skip broadcasting the second episode, blaming football coverage, eventually releasing it on their website. The last attempt so far by ITV to broadcast acquired output in primetime was the TV adaption of Lethal Weapon in 2017, where it remained for all three seasons.

As of 2024, most US acquired programming that ITV owns the UK rights to, such as Family Guy, Bob's Burgers, The O.C., Dawson's Creek, Gilmore Girls and Superstore air on ITV2, as opposed to the main ITV network.

=== Notable programming ===
==== Daytime programming ====
- Good Morning Britain
- Lorraine
- This Morning
- Loose Women
- ITV Lunchtime News
- Dickinson's Real Deal
- Tenable
- Lingo
- Riddiculous
- Tipping Point
- Deal or No Deal
- Jeopardy!
- The Chase

==== Primetime programming ====
- ITV Evening News
- ITV News at Ten
- Emmerdale
- Coronation Street
- Tonight
- Who Wants to Be a Millionaire?
- Midsomer Murders
- Vera
- The Bay
- My Mum, Your Dad
- I'm a Celebrity...Get Me Out of Here!
- Big Brother
- Celebrity Big Brother
- The Martin Lewis Money Show
- Beat the Chasers
- On Assignment
- Paul O'Grady: For the Love of Dogs
- Kate Garraway's Life Stories
- ITV Sport
- Peston

==== Weekend programming ====
- The 1% Club
- Ant & Dec's Saturday Night Takeaway
- Britain's Got Talent
- Catchphrase
- The Chase: Celebrity Special
- Dancing on Ice
- Family Fortunes
- ITV Weekend News
- ITV Racing
- James Martin's Saturday Morning
- John and Lisa's Weekend Kitchen
- The John Bishop Show
- The Jonathan Ross Show
- Limitless Win
- Love Your Garden
- The Masked Singer
- Password
- Soccer Aid
- Tipping Point: Lucky Stars
- The Voice UK
- The Voice Kids
- Wheel of Fortune

==== Night-time programming ====
- AEW Dynamite
- AEW Rampage
- Motorsport
- Shop Direct
- Unwind with ITV

=== Teletext provider ===
The Public Teletext Licence allows the holder to broadcast a text-based information service around the clock on Channel 3 (as well as Channel 4 and S4C) frequencies. Teletext on ITV was provided by ORACLE from 1974 until 1993 and from 1993 to 2010 by Teletext Ltd., whose news, sport and TV listings pages rivalled the BBC's offering, Ceefax on terrestrial and BBC Red Button on digital. Teletext Ltd. also provided digital teletext for the Channel 3 services, as well as the text output for both Channel 4 and S4C under the same licence and Channel 5. However, the licence was revoked by Ofcom on 29 January 2010 for failing to provide news and local non-news information on ITV and there is currently no teletext licence holder for ITV.

== Availability outside the UK ==
ITV (as UTV) is widely available in Ireland, where it is received directly in areas bordering Northern Ireland, or in coastal areas from Wales (as ITV Cymru Wales). Until 2015, it was also carried on cable, when it was replaced by UTV Ireland, which was itself replaced by be3, now Virgin Media Three. ITV programming is also available to Irish viewers on Virgin Media One (including soap operas Emmerdale and Coronation Street). ITV is also available on cable and IPTV in Switzerland and Liechtenstein. Since 27 March 2013, it has been offered by the British Forces Broadcasting Service (BFBS) to members of HM Forces and their families around the world, replacing the BFBS3 TV channel, which already carried a selection of ITV programmes.

== Awards and nominations ==
Year	Association	Category	Nominee(s)	Result
2017	Diversity in Media Awards	Broadcaster of the Year	ITV	Nominated

== Visual identity ==
1989

1998

ITV logos shared between the network companies before the establishment of a single ITV1 channel in England, Wales and Southern Scotland in 2002

Prior to 1989, there had never been an identity for ITV as a whole that was adopted uniformly by all broadcasters within the ITV network. Before 1989, each regional company used its own name for identification and the name "ITV" was rarely seen on screen, except for some sub-brands such as ITV Schools, ITV Sport or promos produced for the network, like "Christmas on ITV". In September 1989, a national ITV corporate identity was established, which saw regional brands combined with the national ITV brand, although the balance between regional and national brands varied from company to company, and some companies never used the ITV brand at all. It was not until October 2002 that national ITV-branded continuity was adopted across all the regions in England and Wales (see ITV1), although regional continuity before local programmes continued until November 2006.

== See also ==
- List of ITV channels
- List of ITV journalists and newsreaders
- List of television programmes broadcast by ITV
