= Ben McGrail =

British broadcast journalist

- Born: Ben McGrail; 4 November; London
- Occupation: Broadcast journalist
- Known for: ITV News West Country

Ben McGrail (born 4 November) is a British broadcast journalist, best known for his work at ITV News West Country as their Somerset Correspondent.

== Career ==
McGrail studied broadcast journalism at the University of Leeds from 2004 to 2007 where he started in radio at the student radio station LSR. After graduating, McGrail worked as a freelance journalist before joining Andover Sound in September 2008 as news editor and drivetime presenter. In 2011 McGrail was appointed as the drivetime presenter on BBC Somerset and in 2013 he took over the 9 am mid-morning phone-in programme.

In 2017 McGrail was announced as the new Somerset Correspondent for ITV News West Country.

== Awards ==
In 2010 McGrail and the Andover Sound news team won a silver at the Sony Radio Academy Awards in the Journalist of the Year category. In 2014 McGrail's radio show won the South West Media Award for Radio News/Current Affairs Programme of the Year. Meanwhile in 2015 McGrail won a national Mind Media Award for his coverage of mental health in Somerset.
