= ITV Nightscreen =

UK television programme

- Country of origin: United Kingdom
- Original language: English

Production
- Running time: 4 hours (1998–2005); 3 hours (2005–2007); 2 hours (2007–2010); 1 hour, 30 minutes (2010–2013); 1 hour, 15 minutes (2013–2021); 1 hour (2021)
- Production company: Gower Creative Communications

Original release
- Network: ITV, ITV2, ITV3, ITV4, ITVBe, Men & Motors
- Release: 14 January 1998 – 1 October 2021

Related
- Unwind with ITV/STV; Jobfinder The Nightshift

ITV Nightscreen is a scheduled programme on the ITV television network that was broadcast from 1998 to 2021. It consisted of a sequence of animated pages of information about ITV's upcoming programmes, features and special events, with easy listening music in the background. The programme was used to fill the station's overnight downtime, wherein a closedown would have once been used at the end of programmes. The programme was generally shown every night. However, on ITV's additional channels which only began broadcasting in the digital era, the amount of Teleshopping affected how much Nightscreen was broadcast.

== Origins and history ==
Teletext screens had been used by the BBC since 1980 and Channel 4 since 1983 to fill airtime cheaply. However teletext was only ever occasionally used on the ITV network due to ITV having been on air all day every day since the early 1970s. From April 1986, certain regions, firstly Central Independent Television, followed in January 1987 by Yorkshire Television, started showing overnight teletext sequences containing details of local job vacancies under the title Jobfinder. Initially the pages were broadcast for an hour after the end of regular programming but from April 1987 Central broadcast Jobfinder throughout its overnight downtime. Also, for a short while in 1987, an Oracle-provided service preceding TV-am broadcasts, known as Daybreak, was broadcast before the start of TV-am's programming. When 24-hour television began in 1988, the majority of ITV regions broadcast a Jobfinder programme in the hour preceding the ITV Morning News. These pages continued to be broadcast in some regions until the mid-1990s.

Nightscreen was first broadcast on 14 January 1998, and consisted of teletext pages taken from the ITV regional teletext services, with interstitial teletext-based animations in a similar style to the former 4-Tel On View. From 2003 the screens were produced using Scala InfoChannel3. In early 2009, updated systems were installed with the latest version of Scala5, with a dual redundant system to counter any issues of service. In April 2012, the system was upgraded again to a newer version of Scala5. The Scala system was provided by Beaver Group, and the programme was produced by Gower Creative Communications with soundtracks provided by KPM Music and BMG Production Music. This, amongst other minor presentational changes, allowed compatibility of the service to be transmitted in 16:9 widescreen for the first time, as opposed to 4:3.

In February 1999, STV started carrying Nightscreen as a programming filler during its overnight programming strand 'Night Time TV' (run by SMG and jointly aired between the Scottish and Grampian regions at the time), whilst sister station Grampian had already carried Nightscreen as a filler in their programming schedules by this time too.

ITV Channel Television previously ran its own version of the service entitled Channel Nightscreen consisting of local news headlines and programming information. Channel Nightscreen was axed towards the end of 2011 shortly after ITV plc brought Channel Television.

In April 2010, STV launched its own Scottish night-time service, The Nightshift, broadcast in the STV Central region and consisting of programming highlights, news, competitions and viewers texts and emails read out by a live out-of-vision presenter. STV North continued to broadcast ITV Nightscreen until July 2010, when The Nightshift was extended to the North region. The programme included regional news opt-outs for the four STV sub-regions: Aberdeen & the North, Dundee & Tayside, Edinburgh & the East and Glasgow & the West. STV dropped The Nightshift from its schedules in June 2015, meaning Nightscreen was extended on the station.

In October 2021, the programme was replaced by Unwind with ITV (branded as Unwind with STV on STV in Central Scotland and North of Scotland).

== Broadcasts ==
ITV Nightscreen was broadcast every night on ITV1, STV and UTV. Very occasionally it was not broadcast due to live events happening overnight. such as coverage of national elections in both the United Kingdom and the United States. In the British Superbike seasons 2017 to 2020. Nightscreen was off air one night a week showing highlights.

Nightscreen was also broadcast on ITV2, ITV3, ITV4 and ITVBe. Availability depended on how much unused time was left, and could sometimes last for as little as five minutes as teleshopping is shown on these channels. There was a different music tracklist for each channel, however, upcoming programmes on only the ITV network were shown. CITV did not use the service since the channel closed down at 6:00 pm (later 9:00 pm). Although not an ITV-branded channel, ITV's defunct Men & Motors channel (closed 1 April 2010) would in its later years carry the filler from the close of programming until 6:00 am.

In its early years, Nightscreen would often begin at around 4am and finish before the ITV News at 5:30. The length of the programme varied depending on the overnight schedules. Some ITV regions didn't broadcast Nightscreen initially, including STV, who opted to continue with their own service entitled Scottish Night Time, Meridian, who opted to continue with their own Freescreen service, and Central, who opted to broadcast their own local programming within that slot. In the Yorkshire and Tyne Tees regions, Nightscreen ended at 4:30 am to allow both networks to opt-out for their one hour regional Jobfinder programme.

In December 2005, three months before the now defunct ITV Play began transmitting, a quiz show entitled Quizmania began broadcasting in the early hours on ITV. Subsequent programmes that followed were The Mint, Make Your Play and Glitterball. This resulted in Nightscreen being pushed back to just a half-hour service between 5am and 5:30 am.

In 2008, largely as a result of widespread scandal surrounding phone-ins, ITV Play was permanently axed, meaning that Nightscreen began broadcasting from around 4:30 am. In 2010, ITV started airing The Zone for two hours, a gaming and shopping programme block, usually airing from 12:30 am to 2:30 am, leaving Nightscreen often cut back to as little as an hour and sometimes removed from ITV's schedule altogether. As well as providing focus on upcoming programmes, films and TV listings, it also used to offer entertainment news, sports news, cooking tips, recipes and fact files of characters from famous ITV shows such as Emmerdale and Coronation Street.

From 1 August 2019, home shopping channel Ideal World began simulcasting during part of the overnight period on ITV. Consequently, the two bursts of Nightscreen on UTV and Channel then ceased as these regions then followed network scheduling due to there being no restrictions about their showing Ideal World, unlike the previous gaming programmes. STV began simulcasting Ideal World from September 2021, meaning Nightscreen was only shown once per night on the channel, instead of twice for the final days of it airing

From January 2021, ITV started airing FYI Extra at 3:00 am for 15 minutes daily. This meant that Nightscreen was reduced from 75 minutes to 60 minutes.

On 10 April 2021, due to the death of Prince Philip, Nightscreen was broadcast continually from 12:15 am to 6:00 am without a break, on Channel 3 throughout the United Kingdom and Channel Islands.

== Closure ==
On 2 October 2021, Nightscreen was replaced by Unwind with ITV (Unwind with STV on STV in Central Scotland and North of Scotland). This features time-lapse footage of various peaceful environments with ambient, relaxing music in the background, also provided by BMG Production Music. It is produced by Rock Oyster Media. Ofcom's 2019 Review of Regional TV Production and Programming Guidance stated that these promotional text-based shows could no longer be part of ITV's regional production quotas anymore (from 2021). The final episode of Nightscreen aired on 1 October 2021.

== Other similar services ==
=== RTÉ Aertel ===
A similar filler to ITV Nightscreen was provided by RTÉ, who currently uses this to fill airtime cheaply on RTÉ Two. It is very similar in fashion to Nightscreen as it provides rolling teletext pages while RTÉ Two is not broadcasting.

=== Pages from Ceefax ===
Ceefax was the BBC's teletext information service transmitted via the analogue signal, started in 1974 and continued to run until the UK analogue switch off in October 2012. In-vision Ceefax broadcasts started in 1980, initially as a daytime filler, but as programme hours expanded Ceefax was shown before the start of programming. From 1995 until October 2012, they were seen on BBC Two late at night, most commonly at the weekend but occasionally during the week. The final broadcast was in the early hours of Monday 22 October 2012, two days before Ceefax was switched off when digital switchover was completed. Broadcasts on BBC One had ceased in November 1997 when BBC News was launched as BBC One carries BBC News overnight although occasional Ceefax broadcasts were seen on BBC One Scotland.

=== 4-Tel On View ===
Originally broadcast on weekdays, it alternated with showings of the IBA ETP-1 testcard and Oracle On View. From 1983 until the start of Channel 4's breakfast television service in April 1989, the 4-Tel magazine ran for 15 minutes and was repeated several times each day with transmissions airing at increasingly earlier times of the day as Channel 4 expanded its broadcast hours. In April 1989 Channel 4 began broadcasting programming at breakfast and 4-Tel On View was reduced to a 40-minute slot between 5:20 am and 6:00 am, although from 1993 4-Tel was broadcast throughout Channel 4's closedown period. It ended in January 1997 when Channel 4 began broadcasting a 24-hour television service.

=== Oracle on View ===
Aired from 1983 until 1989 on Channel 4, the 15-minute bursts were originally broadcast at :30 to :45 minutes past the hour but changed to :15 to :30 minutes past in October 1984. Initially the pages were used to showcase various aspects of the Oracle service, changing subject matter every so often, but from September 1987 Oracle On View featured a newsreel and a weather forecast. Oracle On View ended when Channel 4 launched breakfast programming.

=== S4C closedown screen ===
A programme which ran for ten minutes after closedown and for ten minutes before startup. It was phased out in the late 2000s.

=== STV Night Vision ===
A programme which showcases the latest STV programme synopses, Scottish news and weather.
