= Channel East =

Defunct British television channel

- Country: United Kingdom
- Headquarters: Middlesex

History
- Launched: 26 January 2000
- Closed: 23 July 2001

Channel East was a British television channel available on the Sky Digital service targeting the British South Asian population. The channel existed for roughly a year and a half before shutting down due to financial difficulties, ultimately losing its satellite slot. 80% of its programmes were in English.

== History ==
Channel East started broadcasting on 26 January 2000, targeting the 18-40 demographic. In the three months leading to its launch, it only aired a promotional tape. The channel targeted second- and third-generation Asians and promoted British Asian culture beyond bhangra and Bollywood, by offering a line-up for the homogenous community that did not include content such as cricket matches and feature films. Advertising sales were handled by Carlton Communications and programming was done in-house at HDS Studios in London. Viewer data, however, was unavailable.

Initially, the channel was available free to all Sky Digital subscribers, but aimed to start encrypted broadcasts in June 2000. In February 2001, the station was nominated for the 2001 Race in the Media awards alongside Channel 4 and the BBC Asian Network, subsequently winning the category on 26 April.

In February 2001, 100 of its 126 staff were fired. Most staff were working under "sweatshop" conditions, while BECTU blacklisted the channel following problems facing its staff. Following these problems, Channel East shut down.

== Programming ==
Most of Channel East's programmes were in-house productions. One of its talk shows, Cook and Chaat, was likened by The Guardian to the early years of TV-am; Lisa Aziz, who previously worked with the breakfast TV station, was its presenter. Other programmes included Fusion East, a music show, and imported animated series such as Sandokan. The channel's programmes not only catered South Asians in the UK, but also on the European mainland.
