= ITV News West Country =

- Title card for the west sub-region, depicting Smeaton's Tower
- Also known as: Good Morning West Country; The West Country Tonight (2009–2013); The West Country Today (2009–2013)
- Genre: Regional news
- Presented by: Sabet Choudhury; Alex Lovell
- Countries of origin: England, United Kingdom
- Original language: English

Production
- Executive producers: Nimesh Joshi (Head of News)
- Production locations: Bristol, England
- Camera setup: Multi-camera
- Running time: 29 minutes (18:00 broadcast)
- Production company: ITV West Country

Original release
- Network: ITV1 (ITV West Country)
- Release: 16 February 2009 – present

Related
- ITV News; ITV Weather; The West Country Debate; The West Tonight (1970-2009); Westcountry Live (1993-2009)

ITV News West Country is a British television news service broadcast and produced by ITV West Country. It is broadcast from studios in Brislington, Bristol, with district reporters and camera crews based in newsrooms at Plymouth, Exeter, Truro, Taunton, Swindon and Gloucester.

The programme currently transmits into two sub-regions.

- West serving Bristol, Somerset, the majority of Wiltshire and Gloucestershire, and parts of north Dorset.
- South West serving Devon, Cornwall (including the Isles of Scilly), western Dorset, southern and western Somerset.

Its main competitors are BBC Points West in the West region; and BBC Spotlight in the South West region.

Southeastern parts of Wiltshire, eastern parts of Swindon and some parts of eastern Gloucestershire receive ITV News Meridian. The north of Gloucestershire receives ITV News Central.

== History ==
The nightly regional news programme was launched on 16 February 2009 as The West Country Tonight, following the merger of two regional news services – The West Tonight (ITV West) and Westcountry Live (ITV Westcountry).

From 24 November 2016, ITV News West Country began broadcasting in HD on Sky and Freesat only. Freeview and Virgin Media carry ITV News West Country only on the standard definition ITV channel.

== On air staff ==
As of 2024, the presenters are Alex Lovell and Sabet Choudhury. Notable on air staff include Ben McGrail (Somerset correspondent). Notable former on air staff include Lisa Aziz, Alex Beresford, Bob Crampton, Mark Longhurst, Jonty Messer, Kylie Pentelow, Peter Rowell and Steve Scott.

Main presenters history
Years	Presenter 1	Presenter 2
2009	Lisa Aziz	Steve Scott
2009	Ellie Barker or Claire Manning	Steve Scott
2010	Vanessa Cuddeford	Steve Scott
2010–2012	Vanessa Cuddeford	Ian Axton
2012–2013	Cordelia Lynch	Ian Axton
2013–2017	Kylie Pentelow	Ian Axton
2017	Kylie Pentelow	Mark Longhurst
2018–2019, 2020–2022	Kylie Pentelow	Jonty Messer
2019–2020, 2022	Eli-Louise Wringe	Jonty Messer
2022–2023	Eli-Louise Wringe	Sabet Choudhury
2023	Kylie Pentelow	Sabet Choudhury
2024–	Alex Lovell	Sabet Choudhury

== Sub-regional service ==
When the programme launched in February 2009, two opt-out services for the regions served by its predecessor news programmes were retained. These incorporated the first half of the main evening programme on weeknights at 6pm, the full late bulletins after News at Ten on weeknights, and sports news on Mondays and Fridays. On 5 September 2011, separate weekday daytime bulletins for the two sub-regions (at breakfast and lunchtime) were reintroduced.

In September 2013, ITV News West Country extended the opt-outs to at least 20 minutes of the 6pm programme, in addition to separate weekend bulletins, effectively restoring full services for the two areas. Both opt-outs use the same presenter(s) and studio in Bristol, therefore one of the two opt-outs – depending on the day's news – is pre-recorded 'as live' shortly before transmission.

Weather forecasts are pre-recorded and are localised for the West and South West opt-outs. They are produced and presented from Met Office headquarters in Exeter or studios in Bristol.
