= ITV Quiz =

British free-to-air television channel

- Logo used since 9 June 2025
- Country: United Kingdom

Programming
- Language: English
- Picture format: 1080i HDTV (downscaled to 16:9 576i for the SDTV feed)

Ownership
- Owner: ITV plc
- Sister channels: ITV1; ITV2; ITV3; ITV4

History
- Launched: 9 June 2025; 17 months ago
- Replaced: ITVBe

Links
- Website: www.itv.com

Availability

Terrestrial
- Freeview: Channel 28 (SD)

Streaming media
- ITVX: Watch live (UK only)

ITV Quiz is a British free-to-air television channel owned by ITV plc. The channel was launched on 9 June 2025, replacing ITVBe. The channel primarily airs game shows produced for ITV.

== History ==
On 16 April 2025, ITV plc announced a new game show‍–‍oriented channel known as ITV Quiz and would replace ITVBe’s channel space in June. The new channel's schedule would primarily be focused on reruns of recent and current ITV game shows; it had been reported that game show channels were among the most popular free ad–supported streaming television (FAST) channels on ITVX.

The channel's format is unrelated to that of the short-lived ITV Play channel, which focused exclusively on phone-in shows using premium-rate calls, and shut down amid scandals surrounding such programmes.

ITV Quiz launched on 9 June 2025, replacing ITVBe in its channel slots. Its launch lineup featured recent ITV game shows such as Stephen Mulhern's Deal or No Deal, Lingo, Tenable, Tipping Point, Graham Norton's Wheel of Fortune, and Jeremy Clarkson's Who Wants to Be a Millionaire? It competes primarily with Sky's long-running FTA channel Challenge, which itself carries ITV's game shows such as The Chase, Cash Trapped, and Roy Walker's Catchphrase.

As with the other ITV channels, ITV Quiz features its own edition of Unwind with ITV, which shares the channel's late night hours with teleshopping.

== Programming ==
- Ant & Dec's Limitless Win
- Alan Carr's Epic Gameshow
- Beat the Chasers
- Bullseye (2025 Revival)
- Deal or No Deal (2023 revival)
- In for a Penny
- In with a Shout
- Lingo (2021 revival)
- Pictionary
- Riddiculous
- Romesh Ranganathan's Parents' Evening
- Tenable
- The Chase
- Tipping Point
- Wheel of Fortune (2024 revival)
- Who Wants to Be a Millionaire? (2018 revival)
