= On Assignment =

- On Assignment title card
- Presented by: Rageh Omaar (2014-2024); Nina Hossain (2024)
- Starring: ITV News presenters and correspondents
- Country of origin: United Kingdom
- Original language: English

Production
- Producers: ITN Productions for ITV News & Current Affairs
- Running time: 35 minutes (inc. adverts)

Original release
- Network: ITV
- Release: 19 March 2014 – 26 November 2024

Related
- ITV News; Exposure; Peston; Tonight

On Assignment is an ITV current affairs programme, fronted by ITV News international affairs editor, Rageh Omaar. Nina Hossain replaced Rageh from May 2024, after the latter became unwell during a live broadcast of ITV News at Ten in April 2024. Rageh later returned to his broadcasting role with ITV News in January 2025. The programme first aired on 19 March 2014, following ITV News at Ten.

ITV News produced the half-hour programmes, consisting of three long-form reports, focusing on stories across the world, providing colour, background, insight and perspectives on the issues of the moment. Originally broadcast once a month, the series moved to a weekly format in 2017, airing in two series of five episodes a year, before returning to a monthly format.

The last episode of the series was broadcast in November 2024, with no new editions since then.
