= Lisa Aziz =

British news presenter (born 1962)

- Born: Lisa Soraya Aziz; 19 June 1962 (age 64); Totnes, Devon, England
- Education: University of London
- Occupations: Journalist, news presenter
- Years active: 1982–present
- Notable credit(s): TV-am, Sky News, ITV News, Global Radio

Lisa Soraya Aziz (born 19 June 1962) is a British news presenter. She is best known as the presenter of the Morning News on LBC. Before this, she worked for ITV Westcountry as a co-presenter for the evening news programme The West Country Tonight. She later resigned from that post. She also presented the news on TV-am and Sky News, and was one of the first Asian presenters to be seen on television. In 2004, she was the recipient of an EMMA (Ethnic Multicultural Media Academy) award for Best Television News Journalist. Aziz presented the breakfast show on the UK's first 24-hour rolling news radio station LBC News.

== Early life ==
Aziz was born in Totnes, Devon, to a Bangladeshi father and an English mother. She graduated with a BA (Hons) degree in history of art and religious studies from the University of London, after which she joined Radio City, in Liverpool, as a presenter. In 1983, she moved to Bristol, where she worked as a television reporter and presenter for the BBC and HTV West.

== Career ==
In 1988, Aziz joined TV-am as a reporter, before presenting news bulletins for the station the following year. She was one of the first British Asian presenters to be seen on mainstream television, and the first Muslim news presenter. She joined Sky News in 1992, but continued to present bulletins for TV-am, and later went on to become one of the main news presenters at Sky News. In 2000, she presented Cook and Chaat, a prime-time chat show for the ill-fated English-language British South Asian channel Channel East. In 2004, she won the EMMA Best Television News Journalist Award. She returned to the west country in 2005 to become one of the main presenters of the ITV West main news programme The West Tonight. From 16 February 2009, she became co-presenter of the pan-regional news programme The West Country Tonight, which replaced The West Tonight (ITV West) and Westcountry Live (ITV Westcountry) alongside Steve Scott.

In 1992, Aziz was a contestant on Cluedo, teaming up with The Bill actor Kevin Lloyd, conceding to the winning team of Jenny Powell and Nigel Dempster.

In June 2009, Aziz was reported to have gone on leave from ITV West Country after suffering tendinitis.

In mid-June 2009, Aziz disappeared from her presenting role, and was replaced by two younger female presenters: Ellie Barker (ITV West) and Claire Manning (ITV Westcountry).

Private Eye reported on 7 July that Aziz, who by then had not been seen hosting nightly news programme The West Country Tonight for the past month, had been suspended for irregularities with her expenses, one of the irregular items apparently being a £5.75 bill for dry cleaning a child's top. According to the Daily Mirror, the claims amounted to £200. It was later reported that she had initiated legal proceedings against her employers in response to the allegations, and had lodged complaints about four people at ITV West.

Aziz also said that she had not been suspended, but had been signed off work for three months due to stress caused by the expenses allegations. She also received treatment at the Priory Clinic for work-related stress and depression.

On Wednesday 24 February 2010, The Bristol Evening Post reported that Aziz had officially left ITV West, which had dropped all allegations against the broadcaster.

Aziz now lives in south London and works for Global Radio, where she has previously read the morning news on LBC. She presented the breakfast programme on rolling news station LBC News until 4 April 2025.

== Television ==
- HTV News (1984–1988)
- Good Morning Britain (1988–1992)
- QD: The Master Game (1991)
- Cluedo (1992)
- Sky News (1994–2005)
- The West Tonight (2005–2009)
- The West Country Tonight (2009)

== Radio ==
- LBC Nick Ferrari
- Classic FM (UK)
- LBC News Breakfast programme.

== Awards ==
In 2004, Aziz was awarded the EMMA Best Television News Journalist Award.

== See also ==
- British Bangladeshi
- List of British Bangladeshis
