= Jonty Messer =

British journalist

- Occupation: Journalist/Presenter/Newsreader

Jonty Matthew David Messer is a British journalist and newsreader.

== Early life ==
Messer was born in Gloucester and was raised in Andoversford, Gloucestershire. After graduating from the University of the West of England, Bristol, Messer went on to study for a postgraduate diploma in Broadcast Journalism at the London College of Communication (LCC) between 2007 and 2008.

== Career ==
In September 2014, he was working for BBC Radio Swindon.

On 22 January 2018, it was announced by ITV West Country that Messer would take up the position of main presenter at ITV News West Country fronting the 6pm edition of the programme alongside Kylie Pentelow as well as presenting the late news two nights a week. The announcement followed the departure of Mark Longhurst in September 2017. Messer was the stand-in presenter during the interim period.

Messer left ITV West Country on 27 July 2022 and was replaced by Sabet Choudhury.
