= Kylie Pentelow =

British journalist and television newsreader

- Born: Kylie Ann Pentelow; 29 June 1979 (age 47); Northampton, Northamptonshire, England
- Occupations: Journalist, television presenter
- Spouse: Brady Haran
- Children: 1

Kylie Ann Pentelow (born 29 June 1979) is an English journalist and television news presenter, presenting for BBC News. She was a presenter of ITV News West Country and the ITV Weekend News until September 2023, before joining the BBC.

== Education and career ==
Pentelow was educated at the Sir Christopher Hatton School in Wellingborough, Northamptonshire. After graduating from the University of Sheffield with an MA in journalism, her first post was as a reporter for the Bath Chronicle. She then joined BBC Points West as a video journalist, and after joining the BBC graduate training scheme undertook postings in BBC local radio in Oxford and Birmingham, before moving back to television with the BBC News Channel. She then became a reporter/presenter for BBC East Midlands Today.

Pentelow then moved to ITV becoming the North America news correspondent for the ITV Breakfast programme Daybreak, where she was primarily based in New York City.

In July 2013, she became a co-presenter of the ITV West Country regional news programme ITV News West Country.

On 3 May 2014 she made her debut presenting the ITV Weekend News for ITN.

In August 2017, she presented How Safe is a Sun Tan?: Tonight on ITV.

On 4 February 2019 she began fronting Wales at Six for ITV Cymru Wales, on a year long secondment.

From 3 March 2020 she co-presented a 4 part series Dr Ranj On Call on ITV.

In April 2021 and May 2021 she made her debut presenting the ITV Lunchtime News and the ITV Evening News respectively.

Pentelow left ITV in September 2023. Although she did not announce where she was going, she appeared as a presenter on BBC News on 26 October 2023 for the first time since her departure in 2013. She also is a relief presenter of Woman's Hour, on BBC Radio 5 Live and BBC World Service.

== Podcasts ==
=== The Innocence Podcast ===
In March 2022, Pentelow started "The Innocence Podcast" in collaboration with the Innocence Project. The podcast explores the stories of people wrongfully convicted of crimes they did not commit.

=== Younglings ===
In January 2023, Pentelow launched the podcast Younglings, which focuses on parenthood and advice for new parents.
