= Tenable =

British game show

- Genre: Game show
- Presented by: Warwick Davis; Sally Lindsay
- Country of origin: United Kingdom
- Original language: English
- No. of series: 7 (Regular); 1 (All-Stars)
- No. of episodes: 306 (Regular); 4 (All-Stars)

Production
- Production locations: BBC Elstree Centre (2016); Pinewood Studios (2017–2024)
- Running time: 60 minutes (inc. adverts)
- Production company: Initial

Original release
- Network: ITV1
- Release: 14 November 2016 – 30 August 2024

Tenable is a British game show presented by Warwick Davis and briefly Sally Lindsay, airing on ITV1 from 14 November 2016 to 30 August 2024. On each episode, five contestants attempt to win up to £125,000 by filling in lists of 10 items each.

== Gameplay ==
The five contestants who have a prior relationship play the game as a team; one is designated as the captain. The goal in each round is to give as many answers as possible out of 10 in a factual list that fits a particular category, such as "The 10 'TAN' countries" (countries whose names in English include the letter sequence TAN) or "The first 10 UK cities after Belfast alphabetically." Money accumulates in each of the first five rounds according to the table below.

Number correct	Winnings
0-4	£0
5	£1,000
6	£2,500
7	£5,000
8	£10,000
9	£15,000
10	£25,000

For most questions, the host provides a brief explanation of what answers can and cannot be accepted as correct. All correct answers are displayed on a triangular board as they are given. As of the 2020 Christmas Special, some rounds begin with a list of 10 clues displayed on the board; one for each of the required answers. If a contestant's answer is correct, it is shown in place of its corresponding clue. At the end of every round, the host reveals any correct answers not given by the contestant(s) playing it.

Contestants who are deaf or hearing-impaired are allowed to have an interpreter on the stage, who may interpret between spoken words and sign language. However, the interpreter may not suggest answers or take any other active role in the game.

=== Rounds 1 to 4 ===
After hearing the category for each round, the captain designates one teammate to play it. Each teammate may only play one round and may not confer with anyone else. The one teammate who is not chosen for Rounds 1 through 3 must play Round 4 by default.

The contestant must give at least five correct ("tenable") answers in order to qualify for the Final, and may stop after any answer at or beyond this point and bank any money earned. If the contestant completes the list, they automatically advance and bank the money.

Two forms of assistance are available until the fifth correct answer has been given:

- Nominate: The contestant may choose one teammate to provide an answer, then either accept or reject it at their discretion. May be used a maximum of three times during the entire game.
- Overrule: The captain may reject an answer they believe to be incorrect and give a different one in its place. The contestant's answer is tested first; if it is correct, they are not credited with that answer or awarded any money. May be used once per round.

The contestant is also given one life, which allows them to continue without penalty at any time after giving an incorrect answer or being overruled in favour of one given by the captain. A second such mistake ends the round immediately, eliminates the contestant from the game and forfeits any money earned during the round.

=== Round 5 ===
The captain plays this round under the same rules as the first four, with the following changes.

- The overrule option is removed from play, but the captain is still given one life and may use any nominates remaining from Rounds 1 through 4.
- After any correct answer that awards money, the captain may choose to reinstate one eliminated teammate in exchange for dropping back one step on the prize ladder shown above.
- Reinstated teammates may not be nominated to provide answers and will only advance to the Final if the captain either completes the list or chooses to stop.
- Any teammates who have not been reinstated at the end of this round are permanently eliminated from the game without any opportunity to share the prize money if won. The same is true for any teammates reinstated by a captain who goes on to fail the round.
- Regardless of the outcome, the captain advances to the Final.

=== Final ===
The remaining contestants/full team select one of two categories and are given a list pertaining to their choice. They must give one answer at a time, starting with the captain and then proceeding through the other teammates in the order that they played Rounds 1 to 4. Nominates, overrules and lives are no longer in play and no conferring is allowed. Any contestant who gives an incorrect answer is immediately eliminated from the game. Completing the list awards the entire jackpot, split equally among the contestants participating in the Final, while failing to do so awards nothing.

The maximum potential jackpot is £125,000, achievable by banking the full £25,000 in each of Rounds 1 to 5. If the team fails to bank any money during the game, the default jackpot is £500. As of Series 6, if the team fails to complete the list, each member receives a Tenable-themed tea towel as a consolation prize.

== Tenable: All-Stars and Specials ==
A celebrity version under the title Tenable: All-Stars aired sporadically in 2019.

This version is almost the same as the civilian version with one difference where the celebrities receive £1,000 for their charities if they fail to complete the final list. In the 2019 Christmas special, they receive £2,500 for their charities.

There was a Soccer Aid special in 2022 with members of the Glasgow Rangers women's football team taking part.

== Transmissions ==
=== Regular ===
Series	Start date	End date	Episodes
1	14 November 2016	9 December 2016	20
2	30 October 2017	11 May 2018	60
3	3 September 2018	8 March 2019	60
4	14 October 2019	14 February 2020	60
CS	25 December 2020		1
5	15 February 2021	1 September 2021	50
6	20 September 2022	21 October 2022	30
6	11 September 2023	15 September 2023	30
7	7 June 2023		25
7	18 September 2023	30 August 2024	25

=== All-Stars ===
Series	Start date	End date	Episodes
1	5 May 2019	12 May 2019	3
1	29 December 2019		3
CS	26 December 2019		1
