= The West Tonight =

British TV regional news programme (1970–2009)

- Also known as: Report West; HTV News; ITV West News; The West Today; The Westcountry Tonight
- Genre: Regional News
- Presented by: Various
- Country of origin: United Kingdom

Production
- Producer: HTV/ITV West

Original release
- Network: HTV West/ITV West
- Release: 1970 – 15 February 2009

The West Tonight is a regional news programme that served the West of England, produced by ITV West.

== History ==
The launch of Harlech Television in May 1968 led to the launch of a full half-hour evening news programme, Report, broadcast to South Wales and the West of England. Previously, former ITV franchise holder for Wales and the West of England TWW had provided short evening bulletins known as TWW Reports, presented jointly from studios in Cardiff and Bristol, where the station ran a joint news operation covering the two areas.

The opening of a colour service from the Mendip transmitter in May 1970 led to the creation of a separate HTV West service and the launch of a full evening news programme for the region, Report West. Up until the early 1980s, the first half of the programme also aired on HTV's 'General Service', followed by a full edition of Report Wales. During 1982, Report West was relaunched as HTV News.

For 28 years, the main anchor of HTV West's news programmes was former TWW reporter Bruce Hockin, who went on to become one of the longest serving presenters of any ITV news programme. He retired from the station in May 1996, shortly after his 60th birthday.

Shorter daytime, late night and weekend bulletins were gradually introduced - some of which were generally presented by HTV West's continuity announcers, and until 1987, were broadcast from HTV's Cardiff playout centre serving both Wales and the West.

The opening of a digital broadcast centre at HTV's Bristol studios in 1997 led to the relaunch of the main evening programme as The West Tonight. The branding was discontinued two years later and returned as HTV News, and then ITV West News in 2004 following the rebranding of all English and Welsh ITV franchises. The West Tonight was however reintroduced in 2005 when Lisa Aziz rejoined ITV West from Sky News.

On 4 December 2006, ITV Central disbanded its South Midlands sub-region and the parts of Gloucestershire served by Central News South joined the majority of the county already covered by ITV West and began receiving The West Tonight.

In February 2009, ITV West was merged with ITV Westcountry to form ITV West & Westcountry, a new dual-regional service with shorter opt-outs for both areas on weeknights. The Westcountry Tonight was launched on Monday 16 February 2009, although a full regional news service for the West was restored in September 2013.

== Presenters/reporters ==
- Lisa Aziz
- Alex Beresford (freelance with Good Morning Britain, ITV Weather & ITV News West Country)
- Michael Buerk
- Bob Crampton (ITV News West Country)
- Nazaneen Ghaffar (Sky News)
- Alastair Hignell (sports presenter)
- Alison Holloway
- Jackie Kabler (QVC)
- Jan Leeming
- Charlie Neil
- Kevin Owen (RT)
- Peter Rowell (jailed)
- Steve Scott (ITV News)
- Annie St John (deceased)

Preceded by Granada Reports	RTS: Television Journalism; Nations and Regions News Coverage (Weston Pier Fire); 2009	Succeeded by Meridian Tonight (South): Justice for Hannah
