= The Nightshift (TV programme) =

- Voices of: See Presenters
- Theme music composer: Aaron Wheeler
- Country of origin: Scotland

Production
- Producer: Angela Morton
- Running time: 5-6 hours (can vary)
- Production companies: Amo Productions; STV

Original release
- Network: STV Central
- Release: 22 April 2010 – 1 July 2015
- Network: STV North
- Release: 13 July 2010 – 1 July 2015

Related
- ITV Nightscreen

The Nightshift is a Scottish overnight regional television programme broadcast on STV in Northern and Central Scotland. The overnight strand initially began as a local six-week pilot programme in the STV Central region on Thursday 22 April 2010, before launching a second edition for the STV North region on Tuesday 13 July 2010.

The service, broadcast live every night from STV's transmission control centre at Pacific Quay in Glasgow, features highlights of archived STV programmes, reports from STV News at Six, showbiz news items and archive aerial footage of Scotland, as well as texts & e-mails read out live on air by an out-of-vision presenter, Additionally, STV aired a short ITV News bulletin at around 3am before opting out of the network to return to The Nightshift programme for the remainder of the allocated time.

On Tuesday 12 April 2011, a separate edition of The Nightshift began airing in each of STV's four sub-regional areas used for news opt-outs and local advertising:

- Glasgow and West Central Scotland
- Edinburgh and East Central Scotland
- Aberdeen, the North East, Highlands and Islands
- Dundee, Tayside and North East Fife

The sub-regional programmes were axed in October 2011 and replaced with a single pan-regional edition serving both of the Northern and Central areas, with opt-outs for regional news. In December 2011, the programme was cut from seven to four nights a week, airing on Thursday - Sunday nights.

The programme returned to airing every night in February 2014, broadcasting from midnight or thereabouts until 5am, but was cut again to weekends only four months later. The Nightshift ended its original run on Wednesday 1 July 2015, but returned for a brief run from Thursday 27 August to Thursday 1 October 2015.

== Presenters ==
- Laura Boyd (relief)
- Tam Cowan
- Adele Cunningham
- Liam Dolan
- Karen Dunbar
- Alan Edwards
- Gina McKie
- Donny Hughes
- Laura Keenan
- Hayley Matthews
- Gary Marshall
- Scottie McClue
- Derek McIntyre
- Cameron McKenna
- Des McLean
- Angela Morton (producer)
- Josie Smith
- Jim Symon
- Ravi Sagoo
- Shereen Tulloch
