= ITVBe =

British television channel, 2014–2025

- Final logo used from 15 November 2022 to 9 June 2025
- Country: United Kingdom

Programming
- Language: English
- Picture format: 1080i HDTV (downscaled to 16:9 576i for the SDTV feed)
- Timeshift service: ITVBe +1

Ownership
- Owner: ITV plc
- Sister channels: ITV1; ITV2; ITV3; ITV4

History
- Launched: 8 October 2014; 12 years ago
- Closed: 9 June 2025; 1 year ago
- Replaced by: ITV Quiz (channel); ITV2 and ITVX (programming)

ITVBe was a British free-to-air television channel owned by ITV plc. Launched on 8 October 2014, the channel was positioned as a spin-off of ITV2 targeting a female audience, focusing primarily upon reality and lifestyle programmes.

In April 2025, ITV announced that ITVBe would close and be replaced by ITV Quiz. ITVBe closed on 9 June 2025, and ITV Quiz launched the same day.

== History ==
In February 2014, ITV announced that it would launch a new digital channel known as ITVBe by the end of the year. Positioned as a "companion" to ITV2, ITVBe would be focused primarily on reality and lifestyle programmes targeting young adult women, such as The Only Way is Essex (which moved from ITV2 to serve as ITVBe's flagship programme) and the Real Housewives franchise. ITV director of television Peter Fincham explained that the new channel was "an opportunity to develop what is currently part of the ITV2 schedule—reality and non-scripted shows, which are very popular with young women and housewives with kids—into a distinct channel proposition, aimed more squarely at that audience." In July 2014, ITV announced that the channel would launch 8 October 2014.

Logo used between 8 October 2014 and 14 November 2022.

A high-definition simulcast, ITVBe HD, launched on Virgin Media on 19 November 2014, along with a one-hour timeshift feed, ITVBe +1. Both channels were exclusive to Virgin until the ITVBe +1 service was made available on Sky and Freesat on 15 December 2014, and the ITVBe HD service on 12 December 2023.As part of a number of changes to ITV's broadcasting, ITVBe +1 was removed from Sky and Freesat on 13 April 2021.

ITVBe introduced a new children's block, LittleBe on 3 September 2018. It was dedicated to preschool programming and aired daily from 9 a.m. to noon, with its slate including a reboot of long-time CITV series Sooty. The strand ended its run on 31 May 2024, despite ITV reassuring that it would be retained following the closure of the CITV channel.

On 3 September 2020, new episodes of ITVBe programmes began to premiere first on the ITV Hub streaming platform ahead of their linear television broadcast the same day, branded as "EarlyBe".

=== Closure ===
On 16 April 2025, ITV plc announced that ITVBe would retire and be replaced by the new game show channel ITV Quiz in June 2025, with the closure date revealed on 30 May. ITVBe closed on 9 June, with its programming concurrently moved to ITV2 and ITVX. ITVBe's channel space is currently leased by ITV Quiz.

== Most watched programmes ==
The following is a list of the ten most watched episodes of a series on ITVBe since the channel began broadcasting in October 2014. Figures are based on Live +7 data supplied by BARB. The Only Way Is Essex was consistently the highest rated series on ITVBe.

Rank	Show	Viewers (millions)	Date
1	The Only Way Is Essex	1.36	9 November 2014
2	The Only Way Is Essex	1.23	17 April 2016
3	The Only Way Is Essex	1.22	14 October 2018
4	The Only Way Is Essex	1.21	23 September 2018
5	The Only Way Is Essex	1.19	10 April 2016
6	The Only Way Is Essex	1.18	10 October 2014
7	The Only Way Is Essex	1.18	30 October 2016
8	The Only Way Is Essex	1.16	11 November 2018
9	The Only Way Is Essex	1.16	2 November 2014
10	The Only Way Is Essex	1.16	12 March 2017
