= ITV3 =

British free-to-air television channel

- Logo used since 15 November 2022
- Country: United Kingdom

Programming
- Language: English
- Picture format: 1080i HDTV (downscaled to 16:9 576i for the SDTV feed)
- Timeshift service: ITV3 +1

Ownership
- Owner: ITV plc
- Parent: ITV Digital Channels
- Sister channels: ITV1; ITV2; ITV4; ITV Quiz

History
- Launched: 1 November 2004; 22 years ago
- Replaced: Plus

Links
- Website: www.itv.com

Availability

Terrestrial
- Freeview: Channel 10 (SD); Channel 58 (+1)

Streaming media
- ITVX: Watch live (UK only)
- Sky Go: Watch live (UK & Ireland only)
- Virgin TV Go: Watch live (UK only); Watch live (+1) (UK only)
- Virgin TV Anywhere: Watch live (Ireland only)

ITV3 is a British free-to-air television channel owned by ITV Digital Channels, a division of ITV plc. The channel was first launched on Monday 1 November 2004 at 9 pm, replacing Plus (previously known as G+). ITV3 is the sixth-largest UK television channel by audience share and the largest after the five main analogue terrestrial services, the position which was previously held by its sister station ITV2. The channel is primarily devoted to repeats of ITV dramas, and including sequential reruns of Agatha Christie's Poirot, Classic Coronation Street, Classic Emmerdale, Heartbeat, Inspector Morse and A Touch of Frost, amongst others, as well as formerly showing repeats of Kojak, Numb3rs, Columbo, Cagney & Lacey and The Bill, but occasionally shows popular factual programming and is also used as an overflow location for ITV's sports coverage.

== History ==
The channel was announced in November 2003 as part of ITV's post-merger strategies for the free-to-air terrestrial market. Plans outlilned a service for the ABC1 target group, consisting largely of documentaries and dramas such as Inspector Morse, aiming to compete with BBC Four and Channel 4 for viewers.

ITV3 was launched on the terrestrial (Freeview), cable (NTL and Telewest), broadband (HomeChoice) and digital satellite (Sky) on 1 November 2004 at 9:00pm, with the UKTV premiere of Ian Rankin's Rebus. It is also available on TalkTalk TV IPTV and Freesat.

ITV3 was originally conceived as 'ITV Gold', a potential replacement for Carlton Select, when ITV was looking to maximise their multichannel presence due to the growth of digital TV and the Freeview platform, but was faced with lack of space on the Sky platform due to technical limitations and the rights to certain ITV programmes being held by GSkyB, a joint venture run by ITV and Sky which operated a suite of pay TV channels. ITV took full control of Granada Sky Broadcasting, and ceased broadcasting the Granada Plus channel, thereby allowing ITV3 to take the channel number, bandwidth, and programme rights, meaning all platforms could receive the channel from launch. ITV3 was also the only channel in the ITV brand not to simulcast CITV breakfast, until ITV launched two channels in 2014, ITVBe and ITV Encore.

On 10 October 2006, ITV announced to launch a one-hour timeshift service of ITV3, titled ITV3 +1. The channel launched on 30 October 2006 along with ITV2 +1.

The channel had been available from launch on UPC Ireland, but was withdrawn on 22 March 2006. This is believed to have been at the request of ITV plc, which had previously barred Irish newspapers from publishing details of ITV channels and regions other than UTV and Men & Motors. The channel had already been (and remains) available to Irish viewers on free-to-air satellite for some time, however it has not been listed in the Sky electronic programme guide since its removal on 25 January 2006. ITV3 returned to UPC Ireland in the Republic of Ireland on 4 January 2010.

As Freeview announced plans for a retune on 30 September 2009, ITV3 moved to an alternative multiplex. Viewers in areas that have completed switchover who receive their signal from a local relay transmitter not carrying the commercial multiplexes were no longer be able to receive ITV3. It was moved back on 28 March 2018.

On 1 April 2011, ITV3 was removed from UPC Ireland along with ITV2 and ITV4 due to the expiry of a carriage agreement between UPC and ITV. UPC Ireland claim that ITV is not in a position to renegotiate the deal because ITV had struck a deal with another channel provider to provide it with exclusive rights to air certain content from the channels. Conversely, UPC Ireland also claims to have been in discussions right up to the last moment in order to continue broadcasting the channels. ITV2, ITV3 and ITV4 were restored to the UPC Ireland line-up on 20 December 2011. TV3 and its sister channel 3e already hold carriage agreement to air certain ITV content within the Republic of Ireland, alternatively UTV is available within the Republic. ITV2 is available along with ITV3 and ITV4 within Switzerland, all three channels are available on SwisscomTV and UPC Cablecom. ITV3 is registered to broadcast within the European Union/EEA through ALIA in Luxembourg.

It was announced by ITV on 20 September 2017 that reruns of classic episodes of Coronation Street will air twice on weekdays. The repeat run began on 2 October 2017 with the episodes originally broadcast on 15 and 20 January 1986. The episodes air from 2:40 pm on weekday afternoons and are repeated at 6:00 am the following day (except Friday's episodes, which are repeated on the following Monday).

To mark the 60th Anniversary of Coronation Street between 7 and 11 December 2020 at 10:00 pm – 11:05 pm ITV3 re-aired special episodes of the soap including: Episode 1 (Coronation Street), the tenth anniversary episode from December 1970, two episodes from the twentieth anniversary in December 1980, two episodes from the thirtieth anniversary in December 1990, the Coronation Street Live (2000 episode) from the fortieth anniversary in December 2000, and the fiftieth-anniversary episode Coronation Street Live (2010 episode) which was re-transmitted after a repeat of The Road to Coronation Street.

On 18 April 2022 Easter Monday, at 10:25 am until 2:35 pm. Eight special Coronation Street episodes featuring Ken Barlow, were shown to mark the upcoming 90th birthday of William Roache. The episodes shown were ''Episode 1 from December 1960, Ken and Deirdre Tie the Knot from July 1981, Ken's Affair from December 1989, Deirdre's Fling from January 2003, Steve and Karen's Wedding Shocker from February 2004, Ken and Deirdre's Second Wedding from April 2005. Ken and Deirdre's Holiday from August 2014, and Deirdre's Death from July 2015.

It was announced by ITV on 5 January 2019 that reruns of classic episodes of Emmerdale will air twice on weekdays. Two classic episodes were retransmitted between Mondays to Fridays at 1:45 pm until 2:40 pm from 21 January 2019. They are repeated at 7:00 am the following day (except Friday's episodes, which are repeated on the following Monday) The reruns began with episode 1403 (originally shown on 14 November 1989) which was when the title changed from Emmerdale Farm to Emmerdale.

To mark the 50th Anniversary of Emmerdale between 17 and 21 October 2022 at 10:00 pm – 12:05 am ITV3 re-aired special episodes of the soap including: Episode 1 from October 1972, The Train Crash resulting in the deaths of the Skilbeck twins from January 1976, The two episodes of The Mine Explosion from March 1978, Pat Sugden is killed in a car crash from August 1986. The Crossgill Fire and aftermath of Annie Sugden's rescue from May 1988. The Plane Crash episodes from December 1993. Biff and Linda Fowler's Wedding and the following episode resulting in The Death of Dave Glover from December 1996. The New Year Storm resulting in The Woolpack collapsing on Tricia Dingle from January 2004, Zoe Tate's exit and Home Farm is blown up from September 2005. The 40th Anniversary Live Episode from October 2012. Ending with the episodes Debbie and Pete Barton's Wedding, The Helicopter Crash and Death of Val Pollard from August 2015.

On 19 September 2022, ITV3 and other ITV digital channels simulcast ITV's coverage of the funeral of Her Majesty Queen Elizabeth II at Westminster Abbey. ITV3 subsequently simulcast ITV1's airing of the King's Speech and the Coronation of Charles III and Camilla on 25 December 2022 and 6 May 2023, respectively in sign language.

== Crime Thriller Awards ==
The ITV3 Crime Thriller Awards were first held on 3 October 2008, and were broadcast on ITV3 three days later. ITV3 controller Emma Tennant devised the awards to "cement ITV3's reputation as the home of great storytelling and, in particular, great crime thrillers". In 2009, the awards were merged with the Crime Writers' Association Daggers.

== Subsidiary channels ==
=== ITV3 +1 ===
Third +1 logo used since 15 November 2022

ITV launched a one-hour timeshift channel of ITV3 on Monday 30 October 2006, it was allocated channel number 213. The channel number was moved a few years later. ITV2 +1 was launched on the same day.

This channel is often unable to broadcast certain programmes "for legal reasons", but the programme in question might still be listed on the EPG. The channel launched on Freeview on 15 October 2013 using downtime from ITV-owned shopping channel The Store. Initially on Freeview, ITV3 +1 broadcast from 1am till 6am – these hours were extended and brought forward in February 2014, now airing from 6pm till midnight in the higher EPG slot of channel 34. On 25 August 2015, ITV3 +1 extended its hours on Freeview to 6pm till 6am and then in March 2016 it went back to closing at midnight. On 26 September 2018, to coincide with CITV broadcasting until 9pm on Freeview, ITV3 +1 started to broadcast on Freeview from 9pm - 12am. In 2020, to coincide the launch of new channel Merit, ITV3 +1 moved to channel 58 on Freeview swapping with ITVBe +1 which moved to channel 97. Since 30 November 2023, ITV3 +1 cut broadcasting hours to 2 hours each night from 4am - 6am, after ITV cleared a Freeview slot.

=== ITV3 HD ===
Third HD logo used since 15 November 2022

A high-definition simulcast of ITV3, ITV3 HD, was launched on 15 November 2010 alongside the sister channel, ITV4 HD on Sky. The channel was initially available through Sky's pay subscription service in a non-exclusive deal, before being added to Virgin Media's service on 14 March 2013. ITV3 HD offers most of the ITV3 catalogue of recent drama in high definition, including Lewis, Sherlock Holmes and Agatha Christie's Marple and factual series such as Joanna Lumley's Nile and Martin Clunes' Islands of Britain.

On 1 November 2022, in the lead up to the launch of ITVX and as part of the 18th anniversary of ITV3 and 17th anniversary of ITV4, the encryption was dropped on ITV3 HD at around 11 am that day and so became free to air. Later that day, Freesat data had been added to ITV3 HD, indicating that the channel will be made available on Freesat soon. On 8 November 2022 the HD version replaced the SD version on Freesat channel 115.

== Branding ==
=== 2013 rebranding ===
In line with the corporate rebranding of ITV, ITV3 received a new look on 14 January 2013. The channel was described as the "keeper of ITV's treasured and timeless drama", with a new "midnight blue" logo and idents that feature stories told in shadow-puppet style animation inside glass bell jars.

=== 2022 rebranding ===
In line with the launch of the streaming service ITVX, ITV3 received another new look on 15 November 2022. The logo is now coloured purple and uses idents that are cross-used across ITV1, ITV2, ITV4, and ITVBe with different views which reflect the channel's image and programming output.

== Viewership and programming ==
The channel is mainly aimed at the over-35 audience, and its output consists of reruns of older ITV drama series, soap operas and sitcoms. The channel also broadcasts documentaries including programmes from Martin Clunes, Paul O'Grady and Food Travel show, World Kitchen. Between 2008 and 2012 in the daytime. ITV3 broadcast repeats of reality programmes which were originally broadcast on ITV1. The channel broadcast Daily Cooks Challenge in the afternoons between 2008-2012. In 2012, ITV3 broadcast both Countrywise and Countrywise Kitchen but it was only in January and April.

During the 2007 Rugby World Cup, ITV3 broadcast some of the matches while ITV1 and ITV4 were showing live European football matches which were being played at the same time and in the days when ITV4 was an evenings-only service, ITV3 broadcast live weekend coverage of the Tour de France as well as the British Touring Car Championship, and more recently, the ITV Racing. In 2021, ITV3 broadcast the French Open Tennis while ITV4 showed British Touring Car Championship and EFL highlights. ITV3 broadcasts some of ITV’s Snooker and Darts coverage.

=== Current programming ===
- Agatha Christie's Marple
- Agatha Christie's Poirot
- An Audience with...
- Bless This House
- The Bay
- Beecham House
- Blue Murder
- Classic Coronation Street
- Classic Emmerdale
- Cracker
- The Darling Buds of May
- DCI Banks
- Doc Martin
- Downton Abbey
- The Durrells
- Emmerdale Omnibus
- Endeavour
- Foyle's War
- George and Mildred
- The Good Karma Hospital
- Grantchester
- Heartbeat
- Inspector Morse
- Inspector Wexford
- ITV Racing
- Kate & Koji
- Karen Pirie
- Ladies of Letters
- The Larkins
- Law & Order UK
- Lewis
- Little Boy Blue
- The Loch
- Long Lost Family
- Love Your Garden
- Man About the House
- Maigret
- Marcella
- Midsomer Murders
- Mr. Bean
- Never the Twain
- On the Buses (Series 3–7 only)
- Paul O'Grady's Animal Orphans
- Paul O'Grady: For the Love of Dogs
- Prime Suspect
- Rising Damp
- Road to Avonlea
- Rosemary & Thyme
- The Royal
- The Ruth Rendell Mysteries
- Scott & Bailey
- That's My Boy
- Sunday Night at the London Palladium
- Tonight at the London Palladium
- A Touch of Frost
- Trial & Retribution
- Unforgotten
- Upstairs, Downstairs
- Vera
- Victoria
- Where the Heart Is
- Wild at Heart
- Wire in the Blood
- Wycliffe

=== Former programming ===
- The Bill (now on Drama)
- Born and Bred
- Cadfael (now on ITV4)
- Case Sensitive
- Clocking Off (now on Drama)
- Columbo (now on 5USA)
- Countrywise
- Creature Comforts
- Daily Cooks Challenge
- Dancing On Ice Live Tour 2012
- Dempsey and Makepeace (now on ITV4)
- Dickinson's Real Deal
- Dragnet
- Drama Trails
- Dr. Quinn, Medicine Woman
- Due South (now on Great! TV)
- Duty Free
- Film File
- FYI Daily
- French Fields
- Fresh Fields
- Goodnight Sweetheart
- Grandma Jane's Garden Adventures (now on ITV4)
- Hamish Macbeth
- Home to Roost
- Hornblower (now on ITV4)
- The House of Eliott (now on Drama)
- In Loving Memory
- Ironside (now on ITV4)
- Piers Morgan’s Life Stories
- Kojak (now on ITV4)
- The Lakes
- Liverpool 1
- Lovejoy (now on Drama)
- May the Best House Win
- Monarch of the Glen (now on Drama)
- Movies Now
- Murder in Suburbia
- Murder, She Wrote (now on Great! TV)
- Only When I Laugh (now on ITV4)
- Peak Practice (now on Drama)
- P. D. James
- Pie in the Sky (now on Drama)
- The Practice
- Quantum Leap
- Quincy, M.E.
- Rebus (now on Drama and Alibi)
- Robin of Sherwood (now on ITV4)
- Rumpole of the Bailey (now on Drama)
- Second Thoughts
- Sherlock Holmes (now on ITV4)
- Taggart (now on Drama)
- Tales of the Unexpected (now on Sky Arts)
- Terry and June
- The South Bank Show
- "The Upper Hand (now on Comedy Central (UK)
- The Store
- The Two Ronnies
- Whitechapel (now on Drama)
- World Kitchen

== Most watched programmes ==
The following is a list of the ten most watched broadcasts on ITV3 since launch, based on Live +7 data supplied by BARB.

Rank	Programme	Number of Viewers	Date
1	Foyle's War	1,710,000	23 March 2013
2	Lewis	1,504,000	14 July 2012
3	Lewis	1,486,000	16 July 2012
4	Foyle's War	1,473,000	14 January 2012
5	Foyle's War	1,467,000	21 January 2012
6	Lewis	1,429,000	1 July 2012
7	Midsomer Murders	1,425,000	4 July 2014
8	Midsomer Murders	1,414,000	8 January 2011
9	Foyle's War	1,405,000	4 February 2012
10	Foyle's War	1,346,000	13 February 2011

== Former logos ==
First logo used from 1 November 2004 to 15 January 2006

Second logo used from 16 January 2006 to 13 January 2013

Third logo used from 14 January 2013 to 14 November 2022
