= TSW Today =

TSW Today is the news programme on Television South West, the ITV licensee for South West England.

The programme began as Today South West on 4 January 1982, then in 1987 it was renamed Today and in 1989, it became TSW Today.

When Television South West lost its licence to broadcast on Channel 3 and Westcountry Television took over the South West franchise, TSW Today was replaced by Westcountry Live.

== Presenters ==
- Peter Barraclough
- John Doyle
- Jerry Harmer
- Dominic Heale
- Jane Hoffen
- Sue King
- Ruth Langsford
- Chris Rogers
- Judi Spiers
- Ian Stirling
- James Wignall
