= North Hessary Tor transmitting station =

Transmitting station in Devon, England

North Hessary Tor
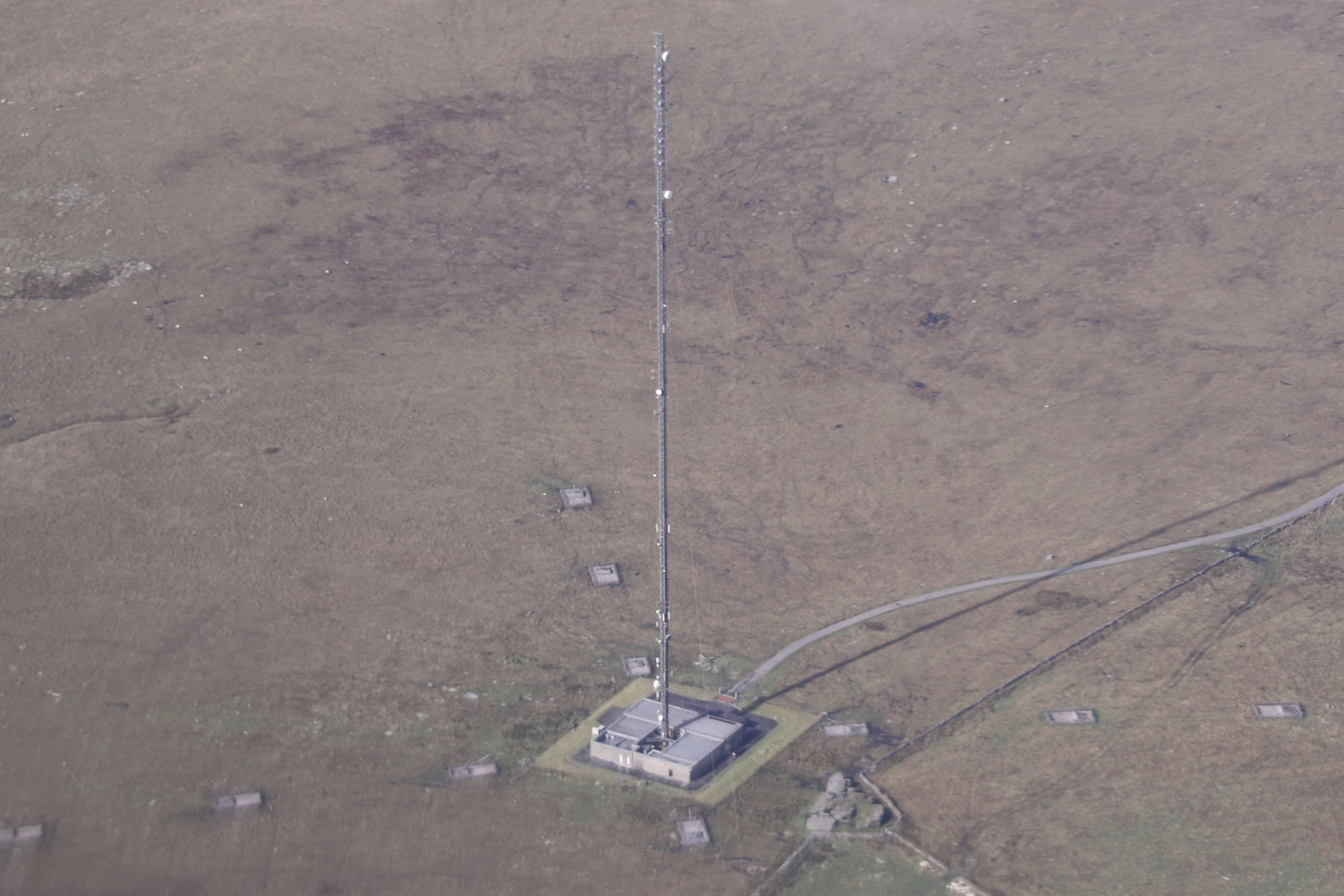

- Mast height: 196 metres (643 ft)
- Coordinates: 50°33′01″N 4°00′30″W
- Grid reference: SX578742
- Built: 1955
- Relay of: Caradon Hill
- BBC region: BBC South West
- ITV region: ITV West Country

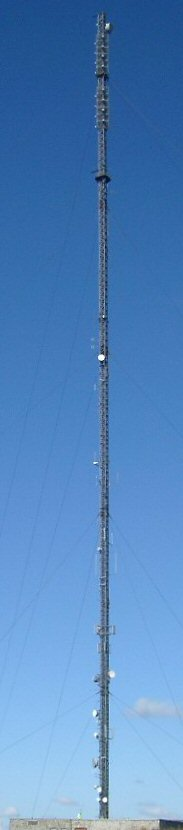
Mast with worker at base

Standing on the summit of North Hessary Tor in Devon, England is an FM radio and television transmitter which uses antennas on a 196 metres (643 ft) high guyed mast.

== History ==
It was built by BICC for the BBC in 1955 when a transmitter was needed to introduce 405-line television into Devon, alongside Rowridge and Pontop Pike (both 500ft). It now carries a small UHF TV transmitter which serves Princetown and Dartmoor. FM radio transmissions began in 1956 and covers most of Devon and eastern parts of Cornwall, along with Somerset and South Wales as a backup for Wenvoe. It is owned and operated by Arqiva.

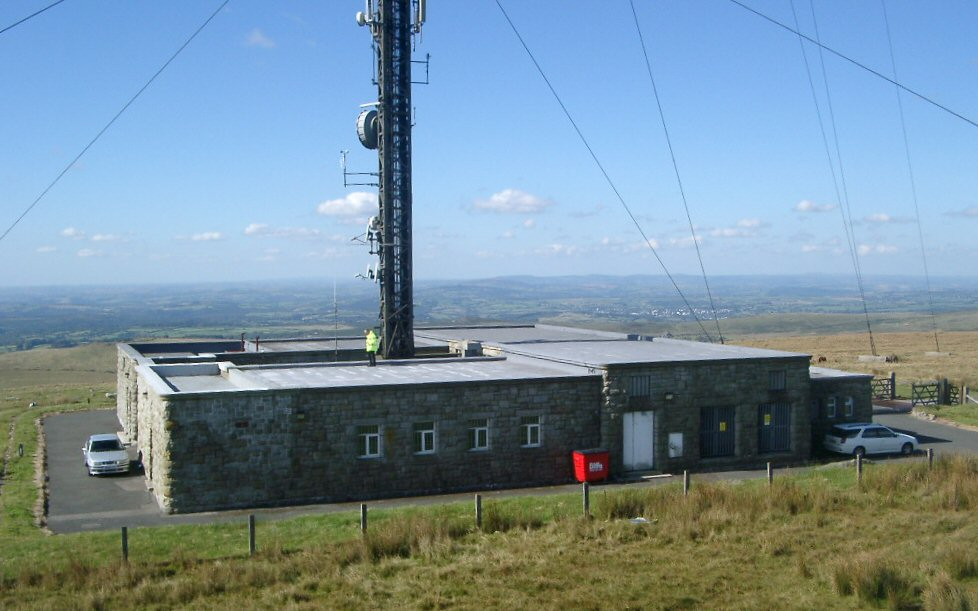
Transmitter building and foot of mast

== Services listed by frequency ==
=== Analogue radio (FM VHF) ===
Frequency	kW	Service
88.1 MHz	160	BBC Radio 2
90.3 MHz	160	BBC Radio 3
92.5 MHz	160	BBC Radio 4
97.7 MHz	160	BBC Radio 1
100.0 MHz	160	Classic FM
103.4 MHz	15	BBC Radio Devon

In all BBC publications the national FM ERPs for North Hessary Tor are listed as 160 kW (mixed polarisation): Classic FM list their ERP as 80 kW (horizontal) and 80 kW (vertical) for North Hessary Tor which equates to the same power as the BBC.

The mast covers a large area including Devon, Cornwall, Somerset and South Wales.

=== Digital radio (DAB) ===
Frequency	Block	kW	Operator
225.648 MHz	12B	3.2	BBC National DAB

=== Analogue television ===
==== 17 December 1954 – 3 January 1985 ====
405 Line transmissions were switched off in 1985. In 1990, it resumed broadcasting on UHF.

Frequency	VHF	kW	Service
51.75 MHz	2	15	BBC Television

==== Until 12 August 2009 ====
Frequency	UHF	kW	Service
743.25 MHz	55	0.012	BBC1 South West
775.25 MHz	59	0.012	Westcountry
799.25 MHz	62	0.012	BBC2 South West
823.25 MHz	65	0.012	Channel 4

=== Analogue and digital television ===
==== 12 August 2009 – 9 September 2009 ====
BBC Two was switched off on UHF 62. BBC A was launched on the old BBC2 Frequency.

Frequency	UHF	kW	Service	System
743.25 MHz	55	0.012	BBC1 South West	PAL System I
775.25 MHz	59	0.012	Westcountry	PAL System I
801.833 MHz	62	0.0025	BBC A	DVB-T
823.25 MHz	65	0.012	Channel 4	PAL System I

=== Digital television ===
==== 9 September 2009 – June 2013 ====
Frequency	UHF	kW	Operator	System
746.000 MHz	55	0.0025	BBC B	DVB-T2
778.000 MHz	59	0.0025	Digital 3&4	DVB-T
801.833 MHz	62	0.0025	BBC A	DVB-T

==== From June 2013 ====
In June 2013, BBC A moved from UHF 62 to UHF 50, to allow for the clearance of the 800 MHz band for 4G LTE mobile services.

Frequency	UHF	kW	Operator	System
706.000 MHz	50	0.0025	BBC A	DVB-T
746.000 MHz	55	0.0025	BBC B	DVB-T2
778.000 MHz	59	0.0025	Digital 3&4	DVB-T

== See also ==
- List of masts
- List of tallest structures in the United Kingdom
