= Birthday People =

British children's television series

Birthday People was a British children's television programme that ran for several years on south-west England's regional channel Westcountry Television. The programme, showcasing children's birthday cards and messages, was Westcountry's replacement for the highly successful Gus Honeybun slots aired by the company's predecessors TSW and Westward and was a considered a very poor replacement by viewers.

During its first few years it was sponsored by McDonald's.

A number of different formats for Birthday People were tried out from 1993, including a nature theme presented by ex-Really Wild Show host Nicola Davies. Chris Langmore, one of Westcountry's two continuity announcers, presented the show with science themes from locations around the South West. From Plymouth City Airport he took the show high over the countryside, presenting one of the sequences from a light aircraft. From Kent's Cavern in Torquay he dressed up as a caveman to show how hard life was in prehistoric times. Westcountry presenters were also sent out to read birthday cards from local tourist attractions. From around 2000, Birthday People was hosted by a pair of puppet characters called Flotsam and Jetsam.

Captain Flotsam lived in a lighthouse on "Herringbone Rock" with his sidekick Jessie the Seagull. Here they would present "The Birthday Log", while having various, often surreal, adventures. The first episode was never aired as it was considered too rude. It was an Easter programme in which Jessie (the seagull) sprayed the lighthouse with eggs. It is believed it was pulled because these eggs came from her bottom. The decision of executives not to air this episode left most of ITV Westcountry baffled. It is not known if a tape of this programme remains.

They would occasionally be joined by other puppet characters - the pirates Salvador Swash and Buckle the Seadog, their cleaner Lighthouse Lil, an errant marauding sock (a pastiche of Alien) and their resident scientist The Eminent Professor, who would frequently be put through painful and humiliating experiments to test a silly theory or would answer emails from the viewers at home (who seemed to include a large number of students).

The programme was only two to three minutes long, but would often have an ongoing story or theme that would take them through the week.

The characters went on to star in their own half-hour Christmas specials in 2002 and 2003, in which Flotsam and Jetsam rescued Father Christmas from the clutches of Swash and Buckle and helped King Arthur recover the Holy Grail from marauding Vikings in an adventure through time (involving a Doctor Who pastiche). The programme aired until 2004.

The show's puppeteers and voices were Dave Oliver, Austin Hackney, Laurence Penfold and Adam Carter; they also wrote the scripts, along with Ian Searle (one of the technicians who worked on the show), who also script-edited the Christmas Special, 'Guardians of the Grail'. The programme was firstly produced by Tod Grimwade, Mike Geldard then took over and produced the weekly show and the two half-hour Christmas specials, the final person to produce the three-minute programmes was I-tasha Honeyghan. Birthday People was filmed at Westcountry Television in Plympton, Plymouth and on location.
