= Ian Stirling (broadcaster) =

British broadcaster

- Born: Ian J. Stirling; 28 October 1940
- Died: 30 June 2005 (aged 64); Brittany, France
- Occupation: Voice Actor • Announcer
- Years active: 1965-present

Ian Stirling (28 October 1940 – 30 June 2005) was a British actor and television presenter, best known for his work with Westward Television and TSW.

Stirling, a stage actor originally from Fife, joined the Royal Scottish Academy of Music and Drama in 1974. He also appeared on television in many acting roles, including parts in A Family at War, Budgie, Pathfinders (TV series, one episode) and Crown Court. Stirling freelanced at Westward before becoming a full-time staff announcer in 1975. Alongside announcing duties, he read regional news bulletins and presented the children's birthdays spot alongside station mascot rabbit puppet Gus Honeybun.

He continued as an announcer and presenter with Westward's successor, TSW, when the station began its sole franchise period on 1 January 1982. He later took over from colleague Roger Shaw as the station's chief announcer, handling most of the peak-time continuity shifts on weekdays, and remained with the company until the end of its final day of transmission on 31 December 1992. On that same evening, Stirling closed the station for the last time alongside announcing colleague Ruth Langsford. Stirling continued his acting career both on the stage and on television, including productions of The Caretaker, Entertaining Mr Sloane and Cabaret. For Westward, he starred in a two-handed play called High Water, and he appeared alongside Patrick Macnee in the one-off TSW drama Where There's A Will.

When Westcountry Television took over from TSW on 1 January 1993, Stirling went freelance but did present a thrice-weekly Soap Review for the station's evening news magazine Westcountry Live and was involved in a number of regional programmes for the station. He presented a four-part series entitled 40 Years of ITV in 2001, celebrating 40 years of ITV regional broadcasting in the South-West of England. Whilst freelance, he also worked for Gemini Radio in Exeter during the mid-1990s. He retired in 2003 and moved to northern France.

Stirling died on 30 June 2005 in a hospice in Brittany after a short battle with cancer, at the age of 64. Shortly after his death, ITV Westcountry paid tribute to Stirling with a special half-hour programme entitled Stirling Salute.
