= Ian Stirling =

Ian Stirling may refer to:

- Ian Stirling (biologist) (1941–2024), Canadian zoologist and marine biologist
- Ian Stirling (broadcaster) (1940–2005), British actor and television presenter

== See also ==
- Iain Stirling (born 1988), Scottish comedian, writer and television presenter
