= Huntshaw Cross transmitting station =

Telecommunications facility in Devon, England

Huntshaw Cross
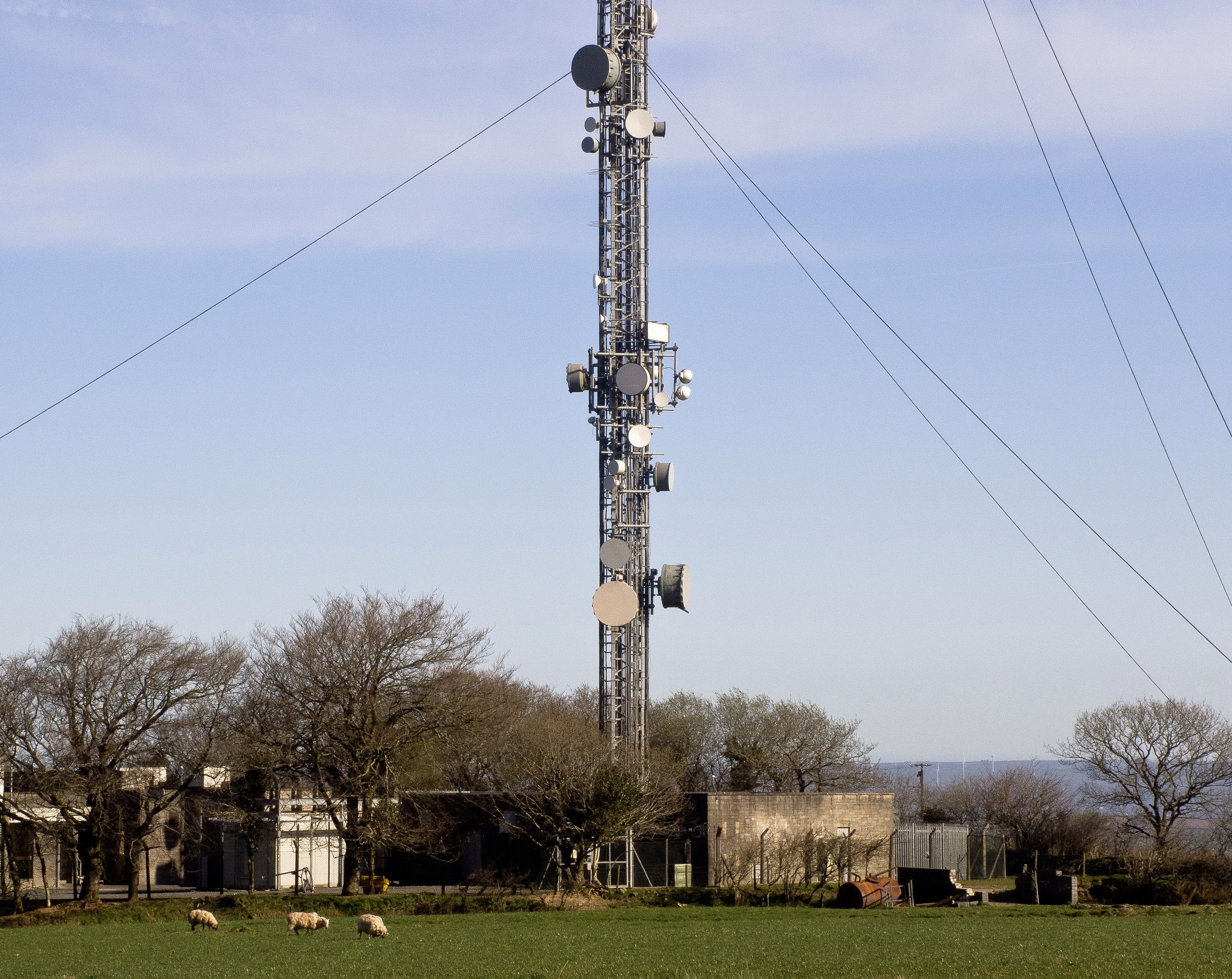

- Location within Devon
- Mast height: 164 metres (538 ft)
- Coordinates: 50.977°N 4.101°W
- Grid reference: SS527220
- Built: 1968
- BBC region: BBC South West
- ITV region: ITV West Country

Huntshaw Cross transmitting station is a telecommunications facility serving North Devon including the towns of Barnstaple and South Molton. It broadcasts television, radio and mobile telephone services and is currently owned by Arqiva. It is located on the B3232 road at Huntshaw, Great Torrington. Grid reference SS527220. The mast is 164 metres (538 ft) high.

The site was opened by the Independent Television Authority on 22 April 1968 carrying the ITV programmes of Westward Television using the now defunct 405 line VHF transmission system. In this context, the site was treated as an off-air relay of Stockland Hill.

625 line UHF colour TV transmissions commenced on 5 November 1973. The high power output of the UHF station and its location allowed its signal to be received clearly in parts of south Wales. It became a popular station from which to receive network programmes from the BBC South West and ITV Westward/TSW regions, as well as Channel 4 which was not broadcast on Welsh transmitters. Evidence of this can easily be seen in Swansea (for instance) where many Group C/D TV aerials can be seen pointing south, across the water.

The 405-line transmissions from Huntshaw Cross were discontinued in the 2nd quarter of 1983, somewhat before the final UK-wide shutdown of the VHF system in January 1985.

Digital switchover began at the site in the early hours of 1 July 2009 when the BBC Two analogue service was switched off just after 01:20 BST. Switchover was completed in the early hours of 29 July 2009 with the analogue services disappearing one by one, starting with BBC One at a few seconds after 01:30. Viewers were required to perform another retune on 30 September 2009 as SDN, Arqiva A and Arqiva B reached their final frequency positions. Final post-DSO power levels were not reached by all multiplexes on this station until March 2012.

Freeview HD became available to viewers using this site from 24 September 2010.

A local DAB multiplex for North Devon began transmitting on 2 February 2012 ahead of full launch on 6 February 2012, the local DAB service is an exact mirror of the DAB service for Exeter and Torbay.

The second national DAB multiplex, operated by Sound Digital, came on air at Huntshaw Cross in early November 2026.

== Channels listed by frequency ==
=== Analogue television ===
==== 22 April 1968 – 5 November 1973 ====
Analogue 405 line TV was launched. The transmitter on 11H was an off air relay of Stockland Hill

Frequency	VHF	kW	Service
204.75 MHz	11H	0.5	Westward

==== 5 November 1973 – 1 November 1982 ====
UHF colour television commenced.

Frequency	VHF	UHF	kW	Service
204.75 MHz	11H	—	0.5	Westward (TSW from 1982)
743.25 MHz	—	55	100	BBC1 South West
775.25 MHz	—	59	100	Westward (TSW from 1982)
799.25 MHz	—	62	100	BBC2 South West

==== 1 November 1982 - Second Quarter 1983 ====
The UK's fourth UHF television channel started up, but wasn't broadcast from Huntshaw Cross until July 1984.

Frequency	VHF	UHF	kW	Service
204.75 MHz	11H	—	0.5	TSW
743.25 MHz	—	55	100	BBC1 South West
775.25 MHz	—	59	100	TSW
799.25 MHz	—	62	100	BBC2 South West
823.25 MHz	—	65	100	Channel 4

==== Second Quarter 1983 - March 1997 ====
405 line television was discontinued early, and for the next 14 years only the four primary analogue UHF channels were radiated.

Frequency	UHF	kW	Service
743.25 MHz	55	100	BBC1 South West
775.25 MHz	59	100	TSW (Westcountry from 1993)
799.25 MHz	62	100	BBC2 South West
823.25 MHz	65	100	Channel 4

==== March 1997 - 1 November 1998 ====
The fifth UK analogue UHF channel was added.

Frequency	UHF	kW	Service
743.25 MHz	55	100	BBC1 South West
775.25 MHz	59	100	Westcountry
799.25 MHz	62	100	BBC2 South West
823.25 MHz	65	100	Channel 4
839.25 MHz	67	2	Channel 5

=== Analogue and Digital television ===
==== 1 November 1998 – 1 July 2009 ====
The initial roll-out of digital television involved running the digital services interleaved (and at low ERP) with the existing analogue services.

Frequency	UHF	kW	Operator	System
729.833 MHz	53-	4	Arqiva (Mux C)	DVB-T
737.833 MHz	54-	4	BBC (Mux 1)	DVB-T
743.25 MHz	55	100	BBC1 South West	PAL
761.833 MHz	57-	4	Arqiva (Mux D)	DVB-T
769.833 MHz	58-	4	Digital 3&4 (Mux 2)	DVB-T
775.25 MHz	59	100	Westcountry	PAL
793.833 MHz	61-	4	SDN (Mux A)	DVB-T
799.25 MHz	62	100	BBC2 South West	PAL
817.833 MHz	64-	4	BBC (Mux B)	DVB-T
823.25 MHz	65	100	Channel 4	PAL
839.25 MHz	67	2	Channel 5	PAL

==== 1 July 2009 – 29 July 2009 ====
Digital Switchover started at Huntshaw Cross. The analogue BBC2 service on channel 62 was switched off, along with the BBC Mux 1 service on channel 54- and the new "BBC A" multiplex started up on the newly vacated channel 62 at full post-DSO power.

Frequency	UHF	kW	Operator	System
729.833 MHz	53-	4	Arqiva (Mux C)	DVB-T
743.25 MHz	55	100	BBC1 South West	PAL
761.833 MHz	57-	4	Arqiva (Mux D)	DVB-T
769.833 MHz	58-	4	Digital 3&4 (Mux 2)	DVB-T
775.25 MHz	59	100	Westcountry	PAL
793.833 MHz	61-	4	SDN (Mux A)	DVB-T
801.833 MHz	62-	20	BBC A	DVB-T
817.833 MHz	64-	4	BBC (Mux B)	DVB-T
823.25 MHz	65	100	Channel 4	PAL
839.25 MHz	67	2	Channel 5	PAL

=== Digital television ===
==== 29 July 2009 – 30 September 2009 ====
All the remaining analogue TV channels were shut down and the new post-DSO digital multiplexes for the PSB channels started up at full power. Huntshaw Cross was subject to a complex multi-stage switchover, and the COM multiplexes (Mux A, Mux C and Mux D) were not switched from their pre-DSO configurations immediately.

Frequency	UHF	kW	Operator	System
729.833 MHz	53-	4	Arqiva (Mux C)	DVB-T
745.833 MHz	55-	20	BBC B	DVB-T2
761.833 MHz	57-	4	Arqiva (Mux D)	DVB-T
777.833 MHz	59-	20	Digital 3&4	DVB-T
793.833 MHz	61-	4	SDN (Mux A)	DVB-T
801.833 MHz	62-	20	BBC A	DVB-T

==== 30 September 2009 – 28 March 2012 ====
With the post-DSO retune event at Mendip, the post-DSO COM multiplexes replaced the pre-DSO COM multiplexes on their final channel allocations, though only the SDN multiplex gained full power at this point.

Frequency	UHF	kW	Operator	System
690.000 MHz	48	10	SDN	DVB-T
722.000 MHz	52	4	Arqiva A	DVB-T
745.833 MHz	55-	20	BBC B	DVB-T2
754.000 MHz	56	4	Arqiva B	DVB-T
777.833 MHz	59-	20	Digital 3&4	DVB-T
801.833 MHz	62-	20	BBC A	DVB-T

==== 28 March 2012 - May 2013 ====
With the second post-DSO retune event at Mendip, the Arq A and Arq B multiplexes gained full power.

Frequency	UHF	kW	Operator	System
690.000 MHz	48	10	SDN	DVB-T
722.000 MHz	52	10	Arqiva A	DVB-T
745.833 MHz	55-	20	BBC B	DVB-T2
754.000 MHz	56	10	Arqiva B	DVB-T
777.833 MHz	59-	20	Digital 3&4	DVB-T
801.833 MHz	62-	20	BBC A	DVB-T

==== From May 2013 ====
Yet another retune was needed in May 2013 as part of the Europe-wide tactic of clearing Band V above 800 MHz so as to make space for future 4G mobile phone services. The BBC A multiplex was reassigned to channel 50.

Frequency	UHF	kW	Operator	System
690.000 MHz	48	10	SDN	DVB-T
706.000 MHz	50	20	BBC A	DVB-T
722.000 MHz	52	10	Arqiva A	DVB-T
745.833 MHz	55-	20	BBC B	DVB-T2
754.000 MHz	56	10	Arqiva B	DVB-T
777.833 MHz	59-	20	Digital 3&4	DVB-T

==== From 19 June 2019 ====
A retune will be needed from 19 June 2019 due to the 700 MHz clearance programme. The recommended television aerial for Huntshaw Cross will change from group C/D to group A.

Frequency	UHF	kW	Operator	System
546.000 MHz	30	20	BBC A	DVB-T
554.000 MHz	31	20	Digital 3&4	DVB-T
562.000 MHz	32	10	SDN	DVB-T
578.000 MHz	34	10	Arqiva A	DVB-T
586.000 MHz	35	10	Arqiva B	DVB-T
602.000 MHz	37	20	BBC B	DVB-T2

=== Analogue radio ===
Frequency	kW	Service
94.8 MHz	0.5	BBC Radio Devon
96.2 MHz	2	Heart West

=== Digital Radio ===
Block	Frequency (MHz)	Power (kW)	Multiplex Name
10C	213.360	4.0	Devon
11D	222.064	4.55	D1 National
12B	225.648	2.5	BBC National DAB
