= ITV plc =

British-based media company

- Logo used since 2024 featuring three colours; yellow as streaming service (ITVX), light blue as TV network (ITV1), and dark blue as studio production (ITV Studios).
- Type: Public
- Traded as: LSE: ITV; FTSE 250 component
- ISIN: GB0033986497; US45069P1075
- Industry: Media
- Predecessors: Granada plc; Carlton Communications
- Founded: 2 February 2004; 22 years ago
- Headquarters: London, England, UK
- Key people: Andrew Cosslett (chairman); Dame Carolyn McCall (Chief Executive)
- Products: Broadcasting; Television production
- Revenue: ▲£3,511 million (2025)
- Operating income: ▲£363 million (2025)
- Net income: ▼£225 million (2025)
- Divisions: ITV Studios; ITV Media & Entertainment
- Website: itvplc.com

ITV plc is a British media company based in London, England, that holds 13 of the 15 regional television licences that make up the ITV network (Channel 3). It is the oldest and largest commercial terrestrial television network in the United Kingdom.

ITV plc is listed on the London Stock Exchange and is a constituent of the FTSE 250 Index. On 6 July 2026, the company announced the sale of its media and entertainment division to Sky, subject to regulatory approval.

== History ==
=== Pre-acquisition ===
ITV plc was the result of Granada purchasing Carlton following the various mergers and acquisitions between the companies of the ITV network that had taken place from 1994 when the ownership rules were relaxed.

The first wave of mergers began with Yorkshire Television acquiring Tyne Tees Television in 1992, forming a parent group called Yorkshire-Tyne Tees Television. In 1994, Carlton Communications – which had owned a 20% stake in Central Independent Television – acquired the remainder of the company and, because of Central's shareholdings, inherited a 20% stake in Meridian Broadcasting. Later that year, Granada acquired London Weekend Television through a hostile takeover worth in the region of £750 million. MAI, which controlled Meridian Broadcasting, acquired Anglia Television; MAI became United News & Media after merging with United Newspapers – owners of The Daily Express in 1996. Ownership rules, that previously restricted ownership of ITV licences by one company to two outright, plus 20% in a third, were relaxed, and so Carlton went on to acquire Westcountry Television (later re-branding it Carlton, along with Central), Granada acquired Yorkshire-Tyne Tees Television (with the parent group becoming Granada Media, later simply Granada) and United acquired HTV.

Year:	92	93	94	96	97	2000	01	04	08	09	11	16
Central				Carlton; Communications				ITV plc				
(Thames)		Carlton		Carlton; Communications				ITV plc				
(TSW)		Westcountry		Carlton; Communications				ITV plc				
HTV								ITV plc				
(TVS)		Meridian		UNM				ITV plc				
Anglia				UNM				ITV plc				
Granada			Granada plc					ITV plc				
LWT			Granada plc					ITV plc				
Yorkshire	YTTTV							ITV plc				
Tyne Tees	YTTTV							ITV plc				
Border						Capital		ITV plc				
(TV-am)		GMTV										
Channel												
UTV												
Year:	92	93	94	96	97	2000	01	04	08	09	11	16
Diagram displaying consolidation of ITV franchisees into ITV plc

The idiosyncrasies and business model of the future ITV plc operation can be found in the way these new conglomerates operated their licences. Carlton re-branded all of its stations with its own name, creating a single identity across the whole expanse of its territory. By contrast, Granada and United, while keeping the licencees' names, centralised their continuity departments – Granada in Leeds and United in Southampton. All three, however, merged the network production operations of their franchises, creating Carlton Productions, Granada Content and United Productions.

By the end of the 1990s, there were three dominating owners of the ITV franchises in England and Wales: Carlton Communications, Granada plc and United News and Media. In 2000, after an aborted merger attempt with Carlton, UNM decided to leave ITV and Granada bought all the UNM franchises, but sold HTV to Carlton in order to comply with the permitted audience percentage covered by a single broadcasting interest. It kept the production arm of HTV, however, renaming it Granada Bristol and moving it out of Bath Road to a new, smaller office in Whiteladies Road (near the BBC). This arm of the company closed in 2006, following later rationalisation of ITV's production operations. The last remaining independent ITV franchise in England and Wales, Border Television, had been bought by Capital Group in 2000, and was sold on to Granada in 2001, with Border's radio assets being retained by Capital Radio plc.

=== The acquisition ===
Logo used from 2 February 2004 to 15 January 2006

In 2004, Granada purchased Carlton and renamed itself ITV plc, a single company for all ITV franchises in England and Wales. One of the consequences of the merger was (according to the company) an over-capacity of studio facilities and production units around the country, which had previously been rivals, but were now all part of the same group. In order to make cost savings, several large regional headquarters, studio sites and programme departments closed and merged. Among the casualties were network production and studio facilities of Tyne Tees in Newcastle upon Tyne, Meridian in Southampton, Central in Nottingham and Anglia in Norwich. In all cases, ITV moved the regional franchisee to a new location complete with hi-tech facilities for news production, but with a minimal number of (physically smaller) studios and the loss of many jobs. Tyne Tees' factual department merged with Yorkshire's in Leeds (which has since closed and re-emerged as Shiver Productions); Meridian's factual and sport production moved to London; all network production in Nottingham was re-allocated to London, Manchester or Leeds (and the local Central News studio moved to Birmingham), and Anglia Factual, reduced to a satellite operation of ITV Studios and primarily producing output for the international market or occasionally third parties in the UK, was eventually closed in January 2012.

=== Post-acquisition ===
Prior to the acquisition, and despite being rivals within ITV, Granada and Carlton had already been involved in several joint ventures, including the digital terrestrial television operator ITV Digital that went bankrupt, and collapsed in 2002. They also owned the digital channel ITV2, which had launched in December 1998, and 65% of the (re-branded) ITV News Channel, previously owned by ITN and was originally launched as the ITN News Channel. As well as consolidating its (now 40%) shareholding in ITN itself, the newly merged company was able to buy the final 35% stake in the ITV News Channel from ITN's original partners NTL in April 2004. In November the same year, and following a frantic last-minute deal with BSkyB to buy its half of the Granada Sky Broadcasting joint venture, they launched the digital channel ITV3, replacing Granada Plus which ITV plc closed down on satellite and cable. A year later they launched ITV4. However, due to multiplex issues (and the fact that it was losing money) the ITV News Channel controversially had its hours on Freeview reduced, and was finally closed down on 23 December 2005, with its Freeview space being taken over by replacements ITV4 and CITV, which launched in November 2005 and March 2006, respectively.

On 27 April 2005, ITV plc bought SDN, the digital terrestrial franchise holder of Multiplex A (now transmitting ten channels) from its shareholders, S4C and UBM for £134 million.

In April 2006, the participation channel ITV Play was launched. It was also an overnight block on ITV1. Following a series of scandals surrounding participation TV, the dedicated ITV Play channel was closed down in March 2007, followed by the late-night phone-in quiz shows on the ITV Network in December 2007, however the brand continued to be used for a time for part of the gaming section of itv.com.

In August 2006, the company sold its 45% shareholding in TV3 Ireland, which had been bought by Granada in 2001, to Doughty Hanson & Co.

=== Reorganisation ===
Logo used from 16 January 2006 to 13 January 2013

There were rumours of take-over and merger bids during 2006. For example, on 9 November 2006, NTL announced that it had approached ITV plc about a proposed merger. The merger was effectively blocked by British Sky Broadcasting on 17 November 2006 when it bought a 17.9% stake in ITV plc for £940 million, a move that attracted anger from NTL shareholder Richard Branson and an investigation from media and telecoms regulator Ofcom. On 6 December 2006, NTL announced that it had complained to the Office of Fair Trading about BSkyB's move. NTL stated that it had withdrawn its attempt to buy ITV plc, citing that it did not believe that there was any possibility to make a deal on favourable terms. At the same time as the NTL bid, RTL, the then-owner of Channel 5, was also rumoured to be preparing a bid for ITV plc, with the possibility of a stock-swap with BSkyB; the plan would have seen RTL acquiring BSkyB's stake in ITV plc (with the aim of further acquisitions of shares in the future) in exchange for BSkyB taking full control of Channel 5. In the end, no movement was made on this possible deal and RTL sold Channel 5 to Richard Desmond's Northern & Shell Network in July 2010.

The company then entered into a series of disposals of non-core activities: in March 2009 the company sold its investment in Friends Reunited (a website dedicated to reunited former school friends or colleagues in a number of countries) which it had acquired in December 2005. Also in May 2009 the company sold Carlton Screen Advertising (the largest cinema advertising business in the Republic of Ireland and Northern Ireland and now known as Pearl & Dean Ireland).

In 2010, a large-scale business reorganisation, called the "five-year Transformation Plan" was launched. Thanks to stringent working capital management and cost management some of the set goals were already achieved in 2012. These include a ranking upgrade (from BB− to BB+), an increase in audience share and reduction of debt (from net debt of £730 million at the end of 2008, to a positive net cash position of £16 million at the end of the first quarter 2012).

Logo used from 2013 to 2024; ITV1 used this logo from 2013 to 2019.

In December 2013 the company sold its remaining shareholding in STV Group plc (owner of the Scottish and Grampian ITV licences) which had been bought by Carlton in 1999.

On 17 July 2014, BSkyB's 6.4% stake in ITV was sold to Liberty Global, valued at £481 million.

On 19 October 2015, ITV purchased UTV for £100m ensuring that 13 out of the 15 licences (it does not hold the two wholly in Scotland) were in its control. It sold UTV Ireland to Virgin Media in July 2016.

Canadian multinational film and television distributor Entertainment One rejected an ITV takeover offer of around £1 billion in 2016, stating that it "fundamentally undervalue[d] the company and its prospects".

ITV acquired a majority stake in World Productions, producers of hit BBC series Line of Duty, in 2017, making it part of ITV Studios.

In 2022, the company announced the arrival of ITVX, which it said would be Britain's first integrated advertising and subscription funded streaming platform, and would complement its catch-up service, ITV Hub, and would include access to BritBox.

A fall in share value linked to investor worries about declining advertising revenue led to ITV being moved from the FTSE 100 to the FTSE 250 Index in mid-2022.

=== Proposed sale ===
On 23 November 2024, Sky News reported that CVC Capital Partners, TF1 Group, RedBird Capital Partners, All3Media, Mediawan and KKR had been linked to a potential takeover bid for ITV plc and a possible break-up of core assets such as ITV Studios and ITVX.

On 30 January 2025, Reuters reported that RedBird IMI were in early-stage talks with ITV plc to merge the All3Media and ITV Studios production businesses.

In April 2025, the Financial Times reported that Banijay Entertainment was considering making an offer to acquire ITV Studios or, alternatively, the company as a whole.

On 7 November 2025, ITV confirmed it was in talks to sell its media and entertainment division (which includes the TV channels and ITVX) to Comcast subsidiary Sky for £1.6 billion. ITV Studios and ITV plc itself would not be included. The acquisition was announced on 6 July 2026, with Sky's Love Productions to be sold to ITV Studios. Sky has committed to spend £2.1bn on ITV Studios content between 2028 and 2032 as part of the deal, which is expected to require regulatory approval from the Competition and Markets Authority and Ofcom. The deal would see ITV's 40% stake in ITN split equally between Sky and ITV, with Sky committing to maintain "distinct editorial identities" for Sky News and the ITN-produced ITV News until 2030 at the earliest. The ITV brand would be used by both companies under a "brand co-existence agreement".

== Operations ==
=== Organisation ===
ITV plc is divided into two divisions:

- Media and entertainment, which operates the TV networks (including the ITV News Group, which runs the ITV regional licensees)
- ITV Studios, which comprises both UK and international production, ITV's facilities businesses and Global Entertainment which exploits programme rights.

=== Network licences ===
ITV-owned licences in 2004 (Channel TV since 2011)

ITV-owned licences since 2016

Through ITV Broadcasting Ltd, ITV plc holds 13 of a total 15 ITV network licences, with STV holding two ITV licences in Scotland. ITV plc holds all licences in England and Wales, and the single ones in both the Channel Islands and Northern Ireland:

- Owned by Granada plc until 2004:
  - North West England: Granada Television. Service now named ITV Granada.
  - London (on weekends): London Weekend Television. Now part of the ITV London service.
  - North East England: Tyne Tees Television. Service now named ITV Tyne Tees.
  - East of England: Anglia Television. Service now named ITV Anglia.
  - Yorkshire, Lincolnshire and North Norfolk: Yorkshire Television. Service now named ITV Yorkshire.
  - English-Scottish border and Isle of Man: Border Television. Service now named ITV Border (broadcasting for the Isle of Man was taken over by ITV Granada).
  - South and South East England: Meridian Broadcasting. Service now named ITV Meridian.
- Owned by Carlton Communications plc until 2004:
  - London (on weekdays): Carlton Television. Now part of the ITV London service.
  - Midlands: Central Independent Television. Service now named ITV Central.
  - South West England: Westcountry Television. The service was renamed ITV Westcountry until 2009, before it was merged with ITV West to form the new non-franchise ITV West & Westcountry region (rebranded as ITV West Country shortly after). This service became a licence in its own right from 1 January 2014 when it split from Wales and has an opt-out for the western sub-region (formerly the Westcountry region).
  - West of England and Wales: HTV (Harlech Television). The franchise was renamed ITV Wales & West, since it has traditionally held a "dual-region" licence for two areas, each one with its own service: ITV West (now the eastern sub-region of ITV West Country) and ITV Cymru Wales. From 1 January 2014 the dual-region licence was split into two separate licences for Wales and South West England (combining the former West and Westcountry regions).
- Owned by UTV Media plc until 2016:
  - Northern Ireland: UTV
- Former independently owned:
  - Channel Islands: Channel Television, service now named ITV Channel Television (since 2011).

ITV plc is also the sole owner of the ITV national breakfast television licence ITV Breakfast, formerly known as GMTV, which airs and produces Good Morning Britain, and Lorraine.

=== Channels ===
Channel	Type	Launch date	Purpose
ITV1/UTV	Network licence in 13 of the 15 ITV regions	22 September 1955 – 14 September 1962	Flagship ITV channel
ITV2	Wholly owned	7 December 1998	Aimed at the 16–34 age group
ITV3	Wholly owned	1 November 2004	Repeats of ITV dramas
ITV4	Wholly owned	1 November 2005	Sports, cult classic films, US dramas and ITV action shows
ITV Quiz	Wholly owned	9 June 2025	Repeat of ITV gameshows

ITV plc also operates timeshift services and HD feeds for ITV1, ITV2, ITV3, ITV4 and ITV Quiz (only HD feed for ITV Quiz.)

=== Children's television blocks ===
ITV plc ran children's programming through children's television blocks. First was the long running children's block CITV (formerly known as Children's ITV) that launched 3 January 1983 on ITV, being moved to ITV2 on 2 September 2023, the morning after the closure of the CITV Channel. It was broadcast between 5am and 9am every day. In April 2026, the CITV block was wound down in favour of an ITVX vertical.

The second is the dedicated preschool block, LittleBe that launched on 3 September 2018, and ended on 31 May 2024. It was broadcast between 9am and 12am every day on ITVBe. The launch of this block was to be a replacement for its predecessor called Mini CITV, originally launched 7 January 2014 on the CITV Channel. Mini CITV ended 7 January 2014 when the CITV Channel removed all preschool programming from both its weekday and weekend schedules with the exception of Sooty.

=== Streaming ===
ITV Catch Up was rebranded as the ITV Player on 5 December 2008. On 23 November 2015, the app and website were rebranded as ITV Hub. A paid subscription service allows users to watch ad-free and download content.

In November 2022, ITV announced a new streaming service to replace ITV Hub called ITVX, which launched on 8 December 2022. ITVX provides archive programming for which ITV plc owns the license, live events, and exclusive programming. There is a free ad-supported tier and a premium subscription which is ad-free and allows access to BritBox content.
