= Television South West =

ITV franchise holder for the south west of England (1982–1992)

- Logo used from 1 January 1982 – 31 December 1992.

- The TSW region when it lost its franchise in 1992
- Type: Region of television network
- Branding: TSW
- Country: England
- First air date: 1 January 1982; 44 years ago, at 12:00am
- TV transmitters: Stockland Hill, Huntshaw Cross, Caradon Hill, Redruth, Beacon Hill
- Headquarters: Plymouth
- Broadcast area: Cornwall, Devon, Isles of Scilly, southern and western Somerset, western Dorset
- Owner: Independent, public limited company
- Dissolved: 31 December 1992; 33 years ago, at 11:59pm (after 10 years, 365 days)
- Picture format: PAL
- Affiliation: ITV
- Language: English
- Replaced: Westward Television
- Replaced by: Westcountry Television

Television South West (TSW) was the ITV franchise holder for the South West England region from 1 January 1982 until 31 December 1992, broadcasting from studios at Derry's Cross in Plymouth, Devon.

== History ==
=== Origins and Launch ===
On 28 December 1980 TSW was awarded the contract to serve the South West England region from the night of 31 December 1981 at 12 midnight for a 10-year period, succeeding incumbent Westward Television, which had served the area since 1961.

TSW promised greater investment in the area including the introduction of electronic news gathering facilities at a number of sites in the region (a process already started by Westward) and a stronger emphasis on local programming (an area in which Westward had been particularly successful).

However, TSW's success in winning the contract may have been helped by boardroom friction within Westward which had blighted the company for several years and incurred criticism from the Independent Broadcasting Authority. During negotiations to purchase Westward's facilities at Derry's Cross in Plymouth, the management of TSW bought the whole Westward company for £2.38 million and thus went on air four months early on 12 August 1981, although it transmitted under the Westward name until the end of the year.

TSW was seen as slightly more ambitious than both its predecessor Westward Television and its successor Westcountry Television and its presentation, although still homelier than much seen on ITV and not dissimilar to that of Westward, was considered more professional than that of its forebear.

TSW was one of the last ITV companies to start broadcasting 24 hours a day, which it did on 2 September 1988 – the same day as Border Television, Tyne Tees Television and Grampian Television. It was also one of the first ITV companies to broadcast in NICAM digital stereo, which it started doing in summer 1990.

=== Launch ===
Shortly, right after Roger Shaw delivered the closing announcement on Westward's closing night, TSW began with a short video clip of a champagne bottle being opened accompanied by the short audio version of the station ident "That's Soul, Write". Shaw then reappeared wearing a modern suit (no longer in a dinner jacket), and now in a modern chair, surrounded by staff wearing TSW T-shirts and holding 2" videotapes. This was clearly to remind viewers of a new modern era. Shaw made the first announcement on TSW:

...let's say welcome to 1982 from your new television station, Television South West, with the promise a full-bodied blend of the new and familiar. And from all of us here on duty in these first few seconds of 1982, a happy new year from and with TSW. And to get the new year off to a good-humoured start, we have a brand new comedy with Peter Cook and Mimi Kennedy in The Two of Us.

This was followed by the full version of TSW's ident. The comedy programme was followed by further continuity, an epilogue, weather & shipping forecast and closedown – all with TSW branding. However, when the screen finally faded to black at approximately 12:40 am on 1 January 1982, Shaw made a final out-of-vision courtesy announcement and managed to mention the now-defunct Westward one last time, saying 'from all the staff here at Westward – good night'.

=== Franchise loss and closure ===
On 16 October 1991, following changes to the way ITV contracts were issued (via a blind auction rather than a bid on merits and potential) it was announced that TSW had lost its franchise because of an 'unrealistic business plan' related to its bid, which was viewed by the Independent Television Commission (ITC) as being far too high. This triggered TSW to apply for a judicial review against the ITC, on the grounds that its bid had been unfairly dismissed. TSW believed that it was a casualty of the ITC's wish not to renew TVS's franchise, despite being the highest bid, while renewing Granada's when it had been outbid. The case went right to the House of Lords, but was rejected in February 1992. The implications of the court case did change the behaviour of the ITC into being more open with regards to its business.

TSW's high bid of £16.12 million had been influenced largely by managing director Harry Turner's correct expectation of competitors for its franchise area, which were TeleWest Broadcasting (not to be confused with the telecommunications provider of the same name) and Westcountry Television, the latter "looking frighteningly well organised" that had worried TSW. TeleWest was headed by local independent programme producer Mallory Maltby and included BBC News personality Angela Rippon and several ex-TSW personnel in its line-up, but had failed on quality grounds unlike Westcountry. Westcountry, meanwhile, was chaired by merchant banker Stephen Redfarn, who was a former associate of James Gatward (one of the founders of neighbouring TVS), received the support of such figures as John Banham (the then-director of Confederation of British Industry), Frank Copplestone (the former managing director of TVS's predecessor Southern Television) and John Prescott-Thomas (a television executive at BBC South West), and had financial backing from Associated Newspapers, Brittany Ferries and South West Water, which TSW had assumed would have helped Westcountry to "certainly bid to their maximum capacity", a bid a "worried" TSW itself had estimated would have been £12 million a year rather than the less-than-£8 million Westcountry ended up bidding.

=== Closing ceremony ===
Westcountry Television won the South West region franchise and took over from TSW at midnight on 1 January 1993. On 31 December 1992, TSW marked its final day of transmission with a number of special programmes and continuity links. Continuity announcers Sally Meen and Tristram Payne shared the daytime announcing/newsreading shift with Ian Stirling and Ruth Langsford taking over for the last few evening shifts. The day's schedule included the final edition of Gus Honeybun's Magic Birthdays, a repeat of the award-winning documentary, A Day in the Life of...Beryl Cook and a one-hour TSW Today special featuring the last regional news bulletin and an expansive look back at TSW's programming. Along with other ITV broadcasters, with the exceptions of TVS, which broadcast its own farewell special, Goodbye to All That, and both Scottish Television and Grampian Television which broadcast the traditional Hogmanay, the last ever programme broadcast on TSW was Thames Television's own farewell programme, entitled The End Of The Year Show: The Best... from Thames.

After that show's closing credits, the final sign-off announcement was made by Ian Stirling and Ruth Langsford at 11:55 pm, bidding farewell to the departing station by thanking the viewers and paying tribute – after which, TSW handed over to ITN for the news headlines and midnight chimes of the Big Ben in a brief news bulletin entitled Into the New Year. At the end of the bulletin, transmission was switched to Westcountry Television.

=== After 1993 ===
After the franchise loss, TSW undertook a reverse takeover with the White Ward Group, makers of safety footwear and associated articles. The name of the company was changed to UK Safety Ltd, and traded for a number of years, before entering administrative receivership.

Upon losing the franchise, the directors of TSW established a public film and television archive, based around the back catalogue of Westward and TSW programmes they owned. They created the TSW Film and Television Archive, one of the first and largest of what has now become a network of regional film archives. The archive is a charitable trust, existing to preserve the region's moving image heritage. It is open to the public and holds film and television recordings from a wide variety of sources, including donations from the general public.

The archive, renamed the South West Film and Television Archive (SWFTA) in 2003, holds the entire surviving back catalogue of Westward and TSW programmes, and several tens of thousands of other items (which all have a connection to the south-west of England) donated by members of the general public.

The SWFTA, now known as The Box, aims to preserve moving image material as a resource for future generations. The archive is managed by a qualified archivist who is supported by a team of employed staff and volunteers, most of whom came from TSW. They regularly supply material for a wide variety of educational and other uses. They provide community film shows and help anyone with an interest in using or viewing the material they hold. SWFTA participated in the national digitising project Unlocking Film Heritage.

== Studios ==
When TSW won the franchise, the company purchased Westward's studio facilities at Derry's Cross, Plymouth along with all the staff. The studios, which had suffered from a lack of investment under Westward, were completely refurbished with a £4 million investment programme which saw the introduction of new production equipment and an additional studio being constructed. The refurbishment was completed two years later.

When TSW lost its franchise, its successor, Westcountry, chose not to purchase the studios, preferring new facilities outside Plymouth city centre, at Langage Science Park, Plympton instead, ending 31 years of broadcasting from Derry's Cross Studios. Transmission control of the new station would not be handled in Plymouth as previously, but in Cardiff at HTV Wales headquarters. The old TSW studios were then stripped with the equipment being auctioned, and the building itself was converted into offices. A solicitors practice called Foot Anstey (formerly Foot & Bowden) was then based there until 16 March 2009 The former studios were demolished just before Christmas 2009 to make way for an adjacent retail, residential and hotel development.

In addition to the Plymouth base, TSW also operated a newsroom and remote studio in Yeovil, as well as local offices in Barnstaple and Exeter.

== Station identity ==
TSW's symbol was an abstract design representing palm trees, rolling hills and water; features typical of the region.

The music accompanying the original ident was a section of the station theme, That's Soul, Write, written and composed by Will Malone, which was also aired regularly at closedown until 1985.

In September 1989, when the ITV network introduced a new corporate logo and national on-air identity, TSW was one of the five regions that didn't use the generic idents designed for the region, preferring to stay with their own idents.

== Programming ==
Like its predecessor, TSW produced few programmes for the ITV network. Exceptions to this included the game shows, That's My Dog and Sounds Like Music and children's cartoon Tube Mice, about mice who lived beneath the London Underground. It also produced The Cut Price Comedy Show, a short-lived production broadcast in the early days of Channel 4. Locally, TSW continued to utilise the Westward star Gus Honeybun, a rabbit puppet that (along with the station's continuity announcers) read out birthday dedications on-air to children from the area, who had sent in their cards to him.

TSW also specialised in making relatively highbrow programmes for the region; in the arts world, it produced documentaries showcasing amongst others, leading concert pianist Moura Lympany, potter Bernard Leach, and sculptor Barbara Hepworth.

=== Scheduling opt-outs ===
TSW was a notably regional company, declaring itself as a channel in its own right, rather than just being part of the ITV network. It had a reputation for scheduling to suit its own requirements and would often broadcast particular shows at different times to the other ITV regions or even opt out of network activity completely. Such notable scheduling changes included:

- Series two of Blockbusters was not broadcast in full. Around 50 editions of the 1984/5 series were shown eight months later, during summer holiday mornings: 1 July – 24 August 1985.
- Weekday editions of Gus Honeybun's Magic Birthdays often replaced the first and last Children's ITV live in-vision continuity links of the day, from 1987 – 1990.
- The Australian soap, Home and Away was moved from its 5:10 pm teatime repeat slot to a much earlier time-slot of 3:27 pm on 20 September 1989. It stayed in this afternoon time-slot for three years until September 1992.
- The networked sitcom, The Piglet Files, starring Nicholas Lyndhurst, was not shown on TSW until a few months after its original run in all other ITV regions. Another networked sitcom, The Nineteenth Hole, starring Eric Sykes, was dropped mid-run after complaints from viewers regarding its politically incorrect humour.
- The ITV Chart Show was dropped on occasions (mostly for special programmes) so that TSW could show its weekly news review for deaf people, The South West Week.

Additionally, Channel Television, the ITV contractor for the Channel Islands required a network feed from another nearby ITV region on the mainland, which was provided by Westward Television for many years, until it lost its franchise in 1981. TSW took over the requirement from 1982, until 1986, when Channel switched to TVS for the feed instead. After TVS lost its franchise in the 1991 ITV auction round, Meridian Broadcasting provided the network feed from 1993 onwards.

=== Programmes ===
- A Brush With Art (1989)
- About Britain (contributions for the ITV network)
- Amoebas to Zebras
- The Cut Price Comedy Show (for Channel Four)
- Discovering Gardens
- Freeze Frame (originally The Saturday Show, renamed to avoid confusion with the identically-titled networked programme shown around the same time by other ITV stations)
- Frootie Tooties
- Gardens For All (1982–1992)
- Get Fresh (contributions for the ITV network, 1986–88)
- Ghost Train (contributions for the ITV network, 1989–1991)
- Gus Honeybun's Magic Birthdays (1982–1992)
- Highway (contributions for the ITV network, 1983–1992)
- Interpub (1986–88)
- ITV Telethon (local and networked contributions, 1988, 1990, 1992)
- Judi (1984; featuring Judi Spiers)
- Judi Goes On Holiday (1986)
- Morning Worship (contributions for the ITV network, 1982–1992)
- Mr TSW (male beauty pageant, 1982–85)
- Nightcall
- Postscript
- Scene South West
- Sounds Like Music
- The South West Week (1982–1992)
- That's My Dog (1984–88)
- TeleViews
- Today (1986–1989)
- Today South West (1982–86)
- Treasures of the Mindlord (1986)
- TSW Community Action
- TSW Farming Week
- TSW Newsport (1982–1992)
- TSW Sportsweek (1982 – c.1990)
- TSW Today (1989–1992)
- Tube Mice (1988)
- Tuesday View (1986–89)
- Wavelines (1988–89)

== See also ==
- Westward Television
- Westcountry Television
- ITV (TV network)
- History of ITV

ITV regional service
Preceded by Westward Television	South West England; 1 January 1982 – 31 December 1992	Succeeded by ITV Westcountry
