= BBC Radio Devon =

Coordinates: 50.3861°N 4.1266°W

- Plymouth; England
- Broadcast area: Devon
- Frequencies: FM: 94.8 MHz (Barnstaple); FM: 95.7 MHz (Plymouth); FM: 95.8 MHz (Exeter); FM: 96.0 MHz (Okehampton); FM: 103.4 MHz (Devon); FM: 104.3 MHz (Torbay, Torquay and the South Hams); DAB: 10C (Central and North Devon); DAB: 11C (East Devon, Exeter and Torbay); DAB: 12D (Plymouth and South Devon); Freeview: 712

Programming
- Language: English
- Format: Local news, talk and music

Ownership
- Owner: BBC Local Radio, BBC South West

History
- First air date: 17 January 1983
- Former frequencies: 801 MW; 855 MW; 990 MW; 1458 MW

Technical information
- Licensing authority: Ofcom

Links
- Website: BBC Radio Devon

BBC Radio Devon is the BBC's local radio station serving the county of Devon.

It broadcasts on FM, DAB, digital TV and via BBC Sounds from studios in the Mannamead area of Plymouth.

According to RAJAR, the station has a weekly audience of 140,000 listeners as of May 2025.

== History ==
Until 1983, local radio services for Devon had amounted to a regional weekday breakfast show Morning Sou'West, aired on BBC Radio 4's frequencies in Devon and Cornwall, plus five-minute regional bulletins on Saturday mornings and Mondays to Saturdays at lunchtime and teatime. There was no regional output of any kind on Sundays. The regional programming ended on 31 December 1982.

BBC Radio Devon started broadcasting on 17 January 1983, replacing the BBC Radio 4 regional breakfast show Morning Sou'West. On the same day, BBC Radio Cornwall started broadcasting, with whom it shared early afternoon programming, and the BBC launched the UK's first regular breakfast television programme Breakfast Time.

When broadcasting started, the new studios in Exeter had not yet been finished, so BBC Radio Devon was broadcast from portable cabins for the first few weeks. The Exeter studios were officially opened by Alastair Milne, then Director-General of the BBC, on 30 September 1983.

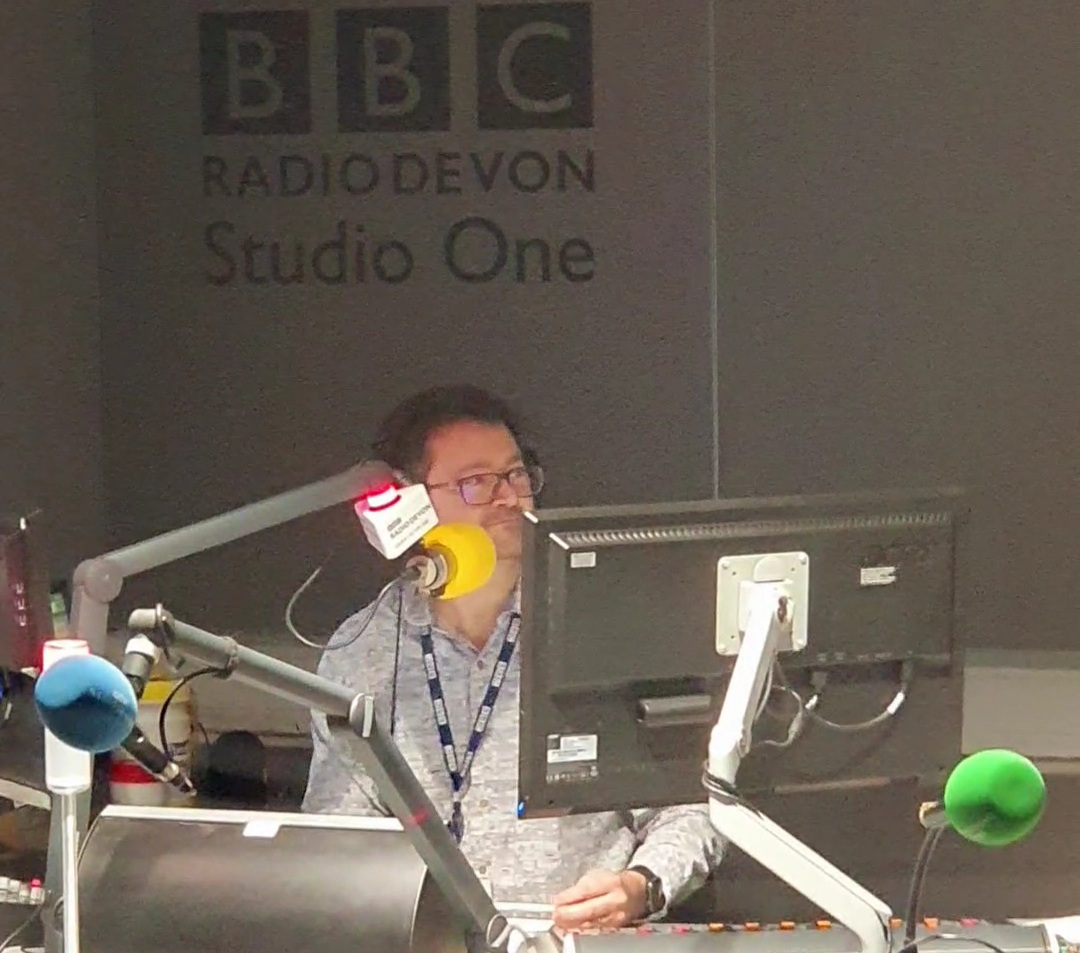
Presenter Michael Chequer in one of the station's studios in 2021

The then new Exeter studio centre at Walnut Gardens on St Davids Hill had the latest in BBC broadcasting technology. The studios were made up of Mark III desks, which were built in-house by BBC engineers and first designed in the 1970s. The studio complex in Exeter consisted of the traditional BBC Local Radio Mark III set up, which saw three studios in a row - two broadcast 'cubicles' as they were known, either side of a centre talk-show style studio, which was home to the news programmes Good Morning Devon and Good Evening Devon. The desks were in use from 1983 until August 2015, when the original Exeter studios were closed and relocated to smaller premises on the outskirts of the city at Pynes Hill. Since 2021, the Exeter studio and office is now located within the Exeter College building on Queen Street.

BBC Radio Devon has reporters based in Exeter, Plymouth, Paignton and Barnstaple and the Plymouth newsroom is shared with the BBC's regional TV news programme Spotlight. The station has won several Sony Awards for its programming.

== Technical ==
Radio Devon is broadcast on the following radio frequencies (transmitter location in brackets):

- FM:
  - 94.8 MHz in Barnstaple (Huntshaw Cross)
  - 95.7 MHz in Plymouth (Plympton)
  - 95.8 MHz in Exeter (St. Thomas)
  - 96.0 MHz in Okehampton
  - 103.4 MHz in Devon (North Hessary Tor)
  - 104.3 MHz in Torbay, Torquay and the South Hams (Beacon Hill)
- DAB:
  - 10C in Central and North Devon
  - 11C in East Devon, Exeter and Torbay
  - 12D in Plymouth and South Devon

The station also broadcasts on Freeview TV channel 712 in the BBC South West region and streams online via BBC Sounds.

Radio Devon previously broadcast on 855 kHz in Plymouth; these transmissions ceased in 2007 and the frequency was used for a trial of Digital Radio Mondiale services, though these trials ultimately did not lead to DRM going into permanent service in the UK.

The station was broadcast on 1458 kHz in the Torbay area until the transmitter closed on 15 January 2018.

The station's other AM transmissions, 801 kHz in North Devon (Barnstaple) and 990 kHz in Exeter, ceased after the 11 am news bulletin on 3 August 2021. They were originally slated to cease in June 2021, but this was postponed.

== Programming ==
Local programming is produced and broadcast from the BBC's Plymouth studios from 6am to 2pm on weekdays and from 10am to 6pm on Saturdays. At all other times until 10pm (6pm on Sundays), programming is simulcast with sister stations in the BBC South West and BBC West regions. Each night from 10pm, BBC Radio Devon broadcasts the England-wide late show and from 1am, BBC Radio Devon simulcasts BBC Radio 5 Live.

== Presenters ==
=== Notable presenters ===
==== Current ====
- Toby Buckland (Sunday mid-mornings)

==== Former ====
- Alan Dedicoat
- Judi Spiers
- Bill Buckley
- Simon Bates
