= BBC Radio Cornwall =

Coordinates: 50°15′45.579″N 5°2′48.0516″W

- Truro; Cornwall
- Broadcast area: Cornwall
- Frequencies: FM: 95.2 MHz (East Cornwall); FM: 96.0 MHz (Isles of Scilly); FM: 103.9 MHz (West Cornwall); DAB: 11B; Freeview: 713
- RDS: BBC CNWL

Programming
- Languages: English, Cornish
- Format: Local news, talk and music

Ownership
- Owner: BBC Local Radio, BBC South West

History
- First air date: 17 January 1983
- Former frequencies: 630 MW; 657 MW

Technical information
- Licensing authority: Ofcom

Links
- Website: BBC Radio Cornwall

BBC Radio Cornwall is the BBC's local radio station serving the duchy of Cornwall.

It broadcasts on FM, DAB, digital TV and via BBC Sounds from studios at Phoenix Wharf in Truro.

According to RAJAR, the station has a weekly audience of 92,000 listeners of May 2025.

== Overview ==
Until 31 December 1982, local radio services for Cornwall had amounted to a regional weekday breakfast show Morning Sou'West, aired on BBC Radio 4's frequencies in Devon and Cornwall, plus five-minute regional bulletins on Saturday mornings and Mondays to Saturdays at lunchtime and teatime. There was no regional output on Sundays.

On 17 January 1983, BBC Radio Cornwall (and BBC Radio Devon) launched, although for its first few years on air, both stations shared an afternoon programme.

== Technical ==
BBC Radio Cornwall is broadcasts on 95.2 MHz for East Cornwall from the Caradon Hill transmitting station located on Bodmin Moor, 96.0 MHz on the Isles of Scilly and 103.9 MHz from Redruth transmitting station located on Lanner Hill for West Cornwall, as well as on DAB. It was also broadcast on 630 kHz and 657 kHz AM until 2 March 2020, when those transmitters were closed for cost savings.

The station also broadcasts on Freeview TV channel 713 in the BBC South West region and streams online via BBC Sounds.

== Programming ==
Local programming is produced and broadcast from the BBC's Truro studios from 6 am to 2 pm on weekdays and from 10 am to 6 pm on Saturdays.

Daniel Pascoe's show (Saturdays 6 pm to 8 pm) and his BBC Introducing show (Saturdays 8 pm to 10 pm) are both broadcast to BBC Radio Devon and BBC Radio Somerset.

David White's Boogie Wonderland show used to be broadcast on Saturdays between 10 pm to 1 am and was also broadcast to stations in the BBC South West and BBC West regions. This programme, along with all other late night regional programming, ended on 7 October 2023 due to BBC cutbacks, and was replaced with a networked England-wide late show which broadcasts every night of the week.

During the station's overnight downtime, BBC Radio Cornwall simulcasts BBC Radio 5 Live

=== Cornish language output ===
Radio Cornwall is one of two radio stations to have broadcast programmes in the Cornish language. A five-minute weekly news bulletin, An Nowodhow, is broadcast every Sunday at 1.55pm.

When Radio Cornwall was first set up Cornish language content was limited to around 2 minutes per week. In 1987, a new weekly 15-minute-long bilingual show, Kroeder Kroghan, detailing Celtic cultural events taking place in Cornwall, was introduced.

In 2026, the BBC commissioned Learn Cornish, Dyski Kernewek, a weekly podcast presented by Cornish Radio 1 host Danni Diston and invited guests related to Cornish language, culture and heritage. The podcast was produced by BBC Radio Cornwall in Truro.

== Presenters ==
=== Notable past presenters ===
- Rod Lyon
- Caroline Righton
- Jonathan Samuels (now at Sky News)
- Brenda Wootton
- Richard Grace (BA Hons History 2021, MA Archives and Records Management)

== See also ==
- List of topics related to Cornwall
- Rewind Radio
- Hits Radio Cornwall
- Heart West
- Radyo an Gernewegva
- Cornish media
- List of Celtic-language media
- NOW Cornwall Multiplex
