= Stockland Hill transmitting station =

Transmitter station in Stockland, Devon, England

Stockland Hill
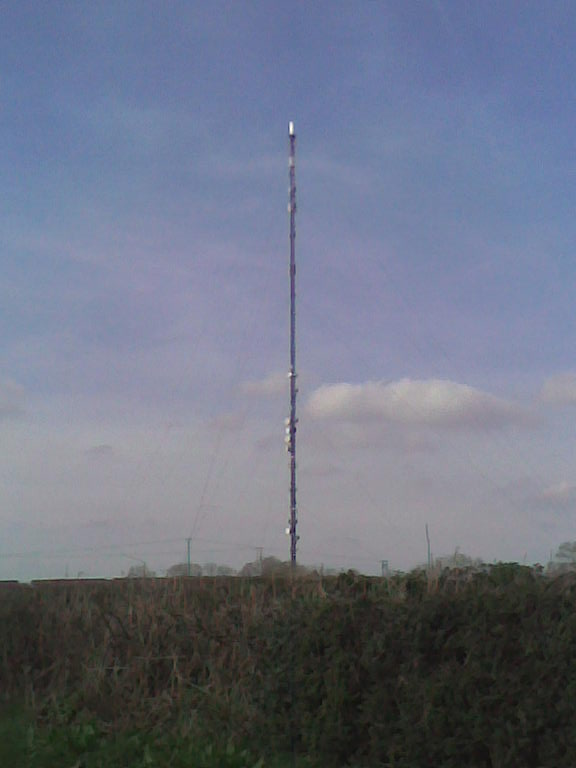

- Location within Devon
- Mast height: 235 metres (771 ft)
- Coordinates: 50.807222°N 3.105°W
- Grid reference: ST222014
- Built: 29 April 1961
- BBC region: BBC South West
- ITV region: ITV West Country

The Stockland Hill transmitting station is a transmitting facility of FM Radio and UHF television located near Honiton, Devon, England.

It was constructed in 1961 by the IBA to transmit ITV 405-line television with transmissions commencing on Band III channel 9 from antennas at 450 m (1,475 ft) above sea level.

Colour television came to the site in 1971. Channel Four started up in November 1982. Stockland Hill never radiated the analogue Channel Five service.

Digital television was first introduced at this site in 1998, and digital switchover happened in May 2009. Stockland Hill was the second transmitter in the south west of England to have its analogue television transmissions shut off. BBC Two was switched off on 6 May 2009 and the rest of the analogue services were switched off on 20 May 2009 around midnight.

Stockland Hill currently transmits all of the digital terrestrial television multiplexes at full planned effective radiated power. The three public service broadcasting multiplexes are at 50 kW, the other three multiplexes are at 25 kW.

This transmitter mainly serves the East of Devon, West Somerset and West Dorset. This includes cities and towns such as Exeter, Sidmouth, Tiverton, Exmouth, Taunton, Yeovil, Bridport, Weymouth and Sherborne.

== Services ==
=== Analogue television ===
==== 29 April 1961 – 13 September 1971 ====
405-line VHF ITV television arrived in the southwest with the simultaneous building of this station and Caradon Hill 60 miles (100 km) to the west in Cornwall.

Frequency	VHF	kW	Service
194.75 MHz	9V	100	Westward

==== 13 September 1971 – 1 November 1982 ====
UHF colour television commenced.

Frequency	VHF	UHF	kW	Service
194.75 MHz	9V	—	100	TSW (Westward until 1981)
487.25 MHz	—	23	250	TSW (Westward until 1981)
511.25 MHz	—	26	250	BBC2 South West
567.25 MHz	—	33	250	BBC1 South West

==== 1 November 1982 – 3 January 1985 ====
The UK's fourth UHF television channel started up.

Frequency	VHF	UHF	kW	Service
194.75 MHz	9V	—	100	TSW
487.25 MHz	—	23	250	TSW
511.25 MHz	—	26	250	BBC2 South West
535.25 MHz	—	29	250	Channel 4
567.25 MHz	—	33	250	BBC1 South West

==== 3 January 1985 – 15 November 1998 ====
The VHF 405-line system was discontinued across the UK, and from that point for the next 23 years, television from Stockland Hill was the originally-intended four channels on UHF only.

Frequency	UHF	kW	Service
487.25 MHz	23	250	Westcountry (TSW until 1992)
511.25 MHz	26	250	BBC2 South West
535.25 MHz	29	250	Channel 4
567.25 MHz	33	250	BBC1 South West

=== Analogue and Digital television ===
==== 15 November 1998 – 6 May 2009 ====
The initial roll-out of digital television involved running the digital services interleaved (and at low ERP) with the existing analogue services.

Frequency	UHF	kW	Service	System
481.833 MHz	22-	5	BBC (Mux 1)	DVB-T
487.25 MHz	23	250	Westcountry	PAL
505.833 MHz	25-	5	SDN (Mux A)	DVB-T
511.25 MHz	26	250	BBC2 South West	PAL
529.833 MHz	28-	5	Digital 3&4 (Mux 2)	DVB-T
535.25 MHz	29	250	Channel 4	PAL
546.166 MHz	30+	2.5	Arqiva (Mux C)	DVB-T
561.833 MHz	32-	5	BBC (Mux B)	DVB-T
567.25 MHz	33	250	BBC1 South West	PAL
578.166 MHz	34+	2.5	Arqiva (Mux D)	DVB-T

==== 6 May 2009 – 20 May 2009 ====
Digital Switchover commenced at Stockland Hill, with analogue BBC2 being switched off on channel 26 and BBC Mux 1 being switched off on channel 22-. Channel 26 was reused by the new BBC A multiplex at full post-DSO power (50 kW) and using 64-QAM with 8k carriers.

Frequency	UHF	kW	Service	System
487.25 MHz	23	250	Westcountry	PAL
505.833 MHz	25-	5	SDN (Mux A)	DVB-T
514.166 MHz	26+	50	BBC A	DVB-T
529.833 MHz	28-	5	Digital 3&4 (Mux 2)	DVB-T
535.25 MHz	29	250	Channel 4	PAL
546.166 MHz	30+	2.5	Arqiva (Mux C)	DVB-T
561.833 MHz	32-	5	BBC (Mux B)	DVB-T
567.25 MHz	33	250	BBC1 South West	PAL
578.166 MHz	34+	2.5	Arqiva (Mux D)	DVB-T

=== Digital television ===
==== 20 May 2009 – 18 April 2012 ====
Digital switchover was completed at Stockland Hill. All analogue television was switched off and the new post-DSO multiplexes took over the analogue frequencies plus a few new ones. Full power could not immediately be achieved for the COM multiplexes due to interference issues at Rowridge and in France.

Frequency	UHF	kW	Operator	System
481.833 MHz	22-	10	Arqiva A	DVB-T
490.166 MHz	23+	50	Digital 3&4	DVB-T
505.833 MHz	25-	10	SDN	DVB-T
514.166 MHz	26+	50	BBC A	DVB-T
529.833 MHz	28-	10	Arqiva B	DVB-T
538.166 MHz	29+	50	BBC B	DVB-T2

==== 18 April 2012 - present ====
The current UHF channels that Stockland Hill is transmitting are:

Frequency	UHF	kW	Operator	System
481.833 MHz	22-	25	Arqiva A	DVB-T
490.166 MHz	23+	50	Digital 3&4	DVB-T
505.833 MHz	25-	25	SDN	DVB-T
514.166 MHz	26+	50	BBC A	DVB-T
529.833 MHz	28-	25	Arqiva B	DVB-T
538.166 MHz	29+	50	BBC B	DVB-T2

=== Analogue radio (FM) ===
Frequency	kW	Service
103.0 MHz	1	Heart West

=== Digital radio (DAB) ===
Frequency	Block	kW	Operator
221.352 MHz	11C	5	NOW Exeter and Torbay
222.064 MHz	11D	2	Digital One
225.648 MHz	12B	5	BBC National DAB
