= Morning Sou'West =

Morning Sou'West was a regional programme broadcast in south west England. It was aired as an opt-out from BBC Radio 4 on Radio 4 VHF/FM frequencies in the south west as well as on several local MW transmitters due to the then incomplete coverage of VHF/FM. It was broadcast on weekday mornings between 6:30 am and 8:35 am, rejoining Today for Yesterday in Parliament when Parliament was sitting - the programme was extended by eight minutes when Parliament was in recess, ending at the same time as the Today programme. The programme was supplemented by five-minute regional news bulletins at 12:55 pm and 5:55 pm. Morning Sou'West was not broadcast at the weekend although regional news bulletins did air on Saturdays at 6:55 am, 7:55 am, 12:55 pm and 5:55 pm. No regional news coverage was broadcast on Sundays.

The programme ended on 31 December 1982, 18 days before the launch of BBC Radio Devon and BBC Radio Cornwall.

The programme's cessation marked the end of regional programming opt-outs on Radio 4 as by now BBC Local Radio was available across much of England.

== See also ==
- Roundabout East Anglia
