= Westcountry Live =

- Also known as: Westcountry News
- Genre: Regional News
- Presented by: Richard Bath; Alexis Bowater
- Country of origin: United Kingdom

Production
- Producer: ITV Westcountry

Original release
- Network: ITV Westcountry
- Release: 4 January 1993 – 15 February 2009

Westcountry Live is the former flagship regional news programme of ITV Westcountry, serving South West England.

== History ==
The programme was first broadcast on Monday 4 January 1993 - four days after Westcountry Television took over the ITV regional franchise from Television South West.

From December 1993 until early 2009, Westcountry ran four sub-regional services, each providing short opt-out bulletins for their area during Westcountry Live and the late-night bulletins on weekdays. Westcountry was the first and only ITV company to produce four opt-outs for their region

The opt-outs were broadcast from Westcountry's district studios in Barnstaple (covering North Devon), Exeter (serving East Devon & parts of Somerset and west Dorset), Plymouth (South Devon and parts of East Cornwall), and Truro (Central and West Cornwall including the Isles of Scilly).

Reporter and camera crews were also based at district newsrooms in Penzance, Taunton, Torbay and Weymouth.

The programme ended on Friday 13 February 2009.

== Merger ==
Following ITV Westcountry's merger with ITV West to form ITV West & Westcountry, the new pan-regional programme The West Country Tonight launched on Monday 16 February 2009. A 20-minute opt-out for the current Westcountry region is featured within the 6pm programme alongside fully separate short bulletins and localised weather forecasts seven days a week. The news service was renamed ITV News West Country on 14 January 2013.

Depending on the day's news, either the West or Westcountry bulletins are pre-recorded. The service is presented from Bristol with newsrooms in Plymouth, Truro and Exeter covering the Westcountry region.

Former Westcountry Live presenters Richard Bath, Alexis Bowater and Jemma Woodman were made redundant. Bath and Woodman presented the final main edition of the programme on Friday 13 February 2009, which featured a special highlights compilation with contributions from presenters, reporters and production staff.

Westcountry's main Plymouth studios were closed along with the district newsrooms in Barnstaple, Penzance, Torbay and Weymouth. A new, smaller Plymouth newsroom opened at the offices of independent production company Twofour.

== Former on air team ==
- John Andrews (ITV News West Country)
- Richard Bath
- Katy Haswell (original presenter)
- Ron Bendell
- Ed Boyle (Powergame)
- Alexis Bowater
- Neil Bradford (BBC Look East)
- Paul Brennan
- Bob Crampton
- Vanessa Cuddeford
- Bob Cruwys (ITV News West Country)
- Martyn Dean (deceased)
- Dan Downs (freelance with Spotlight)
- Lorna Dunkley (Sky News)

Y

- Julie Fisher
- David Foster (original presenter)
- Debbie Geraghty (Powergame)
- Jonathan Gibson (ITV News West Country)
- Sharon Goble
- Tony Gray
- Peter Griffin (freelance with ITV News West Country)
- Kate Haskell (née Reeves; freelance with ITV News West Country)
- Alison Johns (Spotlight)
- Sam Joseph
- Richard Lawrence (ITV News West Country)
- Claire Manning (ITV News West Country)
- Philippa Mina
- Helen Pearson (Daybreak)
- John Ray (Powergame)
- Shelley Roberts (ITV News West Country)
- Tiffany Royce (Daybreak)
- Allen Sinclair (now at BBC South Today)
- Graham Smith (Powergame)
- Emma Snowdon
- Jonathan Swain (Daybreak)
- Philippa Tomson
- Mark Tyler
- Jeff Welch (ITV News West Country)
- Jemma Woodman (Inside Out South West)
- Kathy Wilshere (now Kathy Wardle, “ITV News West Country”)
