= Westward Television =

Former ITV service for South West England

- The Westward region when it lost its franchise in 1981
- Type: Region of television network
- Branding: Westward TV
- Country: England
- First air date: 29 April 1961; 65 years ago
- TV transmitters: Stockland Hill, Huntshaw Cross, Caradon Hill, Redruth, Beacon Hill
- Headquarters: Plymouth
- Broadcast area: Devon, Cornwall, South Somerset, Taunton Deane, West Dorset, West Somerset
- Owner: Self-owned (1961-1981); TSW (c.1981 - 1 January 1982)
- Dissolved: 31 December 1981; 44 years ago, as branding; 1 January 1982 at 12:40 am (alongside TSW brand) as channel (after 20 years, 247 days)
- Picture format: 625- line PAL and 405-line
- Affiliation: ITV
- Language: English
- Replaced by: TSW

Westward Television was the first ITV franchise-holder for the South West of England. It held the franchise from 29 April 1961 until 31 December 1981. After a difficult start, Westward Television provided a popular, distinctive and highly regarded service to its region, until heavy competition led to its franchise not being renewed by the IBA. Westward launched the career of many broadcasters who became well known nationally, won numerous awards for its programming, and heavily influenced its successor, TSW.

== History ==
The company's first chairman was Peter Cadbury, who had left the board of Tyne Tees Television to set up the company and bid for the south-west franchise, which he won against 11 competing bids. Cadbury named the company after the golf course at Westward Ho! in north Devon, where he played. Ironically, Westward Ho! was part of the region that found reception of the television signal most difficult, until the construction of the Huntshaw Cross relay transmitter in 1968. Westward's region was surrounded on three sides by the sea, which was strongly reflected in Westward's output and its company logo, a silver model of the Golden Hind.

In early January 1969, plans were drawn up for a merger between Westward and the Keith Prowse company, as Peter Cadbury was chairman of both. By 17 January, the deal was done. EMI purchased Keith Prowse Music Publishing from Westward in the latter part of 1969. Soon, the Westward board was in continual disagreement, and in January 1970 Cadbury was sacked and re-hired within days as the chairman of the Westward board, after he made outspoken remarks against the levy imposed on advertising revenue imposed by the IBA while also withholding a Westward corporation tax bill to the Inland Revenue over the same matter. By July 1980, Cadbury was finally removed from the Westward board and over the following six months, he tried to regain control.

Westward began broadcasting in colour in 1971, initially from the Redruth transmitter, and a few months later colour was extended to the Stockland Hill and Caradon Hill transmitters. To mark the change, Westward's ident was re-shot in colour.

=== Franchise loss ===
On 28 December 1980, while the ITV network was showing Drake's Venture (Westward Television's two-hour filmed drama to celebrate the 400th anniversary of Sir Francis Drake's circumnavigation of the globe, starring John Thaw), ITN interrupted a commercial break to announce ATV was to undergo major changes and Southern and Westward had not had their licences renewed by the IBA; the south-west franchise was awarded to TSW (Television South West).

Following the loss of its franchise, Westward's management decided to sell up quickly, and the company (including its staff, premises and programme library) was purchased by TSW, early in 1981, for £2.38 million. TSW continued using the Westward name and symbol on screen until 31 December 1981; thereafter, it was re-branded on screen as TSW.

A special programme, 20 Years of Westward, was broadcast on 21 December 1981 to look back on the company's achievements. It was presented by Roger Shaw, and recorded in front of a studio audience. Hastings Mann's Westward Ho! was used as the theme music. Studio guests included Angela Rippon, Kenneth MacLeod and Sheila Kennedy. There were filmed contributions from Alan Freeman, Jan Leeming and David Vine and many clips of Westward programmes were shown. The special programme ended with a message from Peter Cadbury, in which he wished TSW well.

=== Closure ===
Unlike the other ITV stations that lost their franchises in this round, Westward (having been run by successor TSW since August 1981) opted to hand over at midnight on 31 December 1981, and continued as Television South West. No recordings of the end of Westward Television were known to exist until 2012 (the 30th anniversary of the end of Westward), but then a full video recording of the evening, including the segment of STV's wiped Hogmanay show, was recovered by the classic television organisation Kaleidoscope. Parts of the recording were featured at a Kaleidoscope event and at that year's Missing Believed Wiped at the British Film Institute.

== Studios ==
Based at purpose-built studios at Derry's Cross in Plymouth, with a London office (sited at various locations including New Bond Street, Marble Arch and Sloane Square) and a sales office in Bristol.

The Derry's Cross studios were designed by the architects Treadgold and Elsey, who had previously designed the TWW Studios at Pontcanna, Cardiff and Arno's Court, Bristol (Howett 1994).

During Westward's tenure, Derry's Cross had three studios. Studio 1 was 2,500 sq ft (230 m^{2}), Studio 2 was 400 sq ft (37 m^{2}) and used for news, sport and interview programmes and an announcers' studio was located beside Master control.

The studios were originally fitted out by Marconi, using top-of-the-range studio equipment. Westward engineer Peter Rodgers recalled: "From the start, where we could afford it, we bought the best." (Howett 1994) By the time Westward began broadcasting, Derry's Cross had cost Westward over £500,000, with the company committed to spending another £20,000 on the studios by April 1962.

In 1981 the studios, along with the company, were purchased by TSW; in 1993 the building was sold to a firm of solicitors and converted into offices. In 2010 the buildings were demolished to make way for a new retail development.

== Identity ==
Westward Television's corporate branding focused on the sea, and mainly used a ship emblem for their on-screen look. The first ident featured an image of a boat on the water, before replacing the image with a stylised ship image in a circle, complete with Westward legend and channel nine and twelve identifiers (representing the Stockland Hill and Caradon Hill transmitters of the time), to a tune of four chimes. This was replaced in the mid-1960s by a model of the Golden Hind, shot against a black background with a simple Westward caption beneath accompanied by the Holly and the Ivy tune on brass instruments. This ident was altered slightly in the late 1960s to update the font to Compacta Bold.

When colour television came to the region on 22 May 1971, the Golden Hind was re-shot against a blue background with the caption altered to include a small stylised ship image in a box in the lower left corner, followed by an outlined 'Westward TV' caption, with 'TV' in red. The tune that accompanied the colour television ident was originally a nautical fanfare on brass instruments, based on the song "Come Landlord Fill the Flowing Bowl", arranged by Paul Lewis. This formed part of a longer ident theme titled An English Overture, used at the start of each day's broadcasts. The short ident theme was changed around 1978 to a seven-note fanfare. This was Westward's final ident and remained with the company until the end of the franchise.

Gus Honeybun, a puppet rabbit and star of Gus Honeybun's Magic Birthdays, was the station mascot for Westward Television, and later Television South West, from 1961 to December 1992. Gus Honeybun attracted a cult following and it was not unknown for adults to write in requesting "bunny hops" etc. 12 was the official age limit for having a birthday read out on air, so people of 40 were presented as being four and so on. Gus Honeybun was so identified with regional television in the south-west that when TSW's managing director Harry Turner presented the station's ITV franchise renewal in 1991 he took Gus with him.

== Programming ==
Westward's small size and the structure of ITV (which, at the time, deliberately made it hard for small and medium-sized ITV companies to contribute to the network) meant it produced comparatively little output for the network. Instead, the company concentrated on regional programming. From 1968 until the end of its franchise, the ITA (later the IBA) gave Westward a target of providing 6.5 hours of new regional programming a week - a target which they always exceeded.

Westward's programming schedule was always published as a magazine for the public to access. Initially, they published weekly programme listings in its own programme journal, Look Westward. The first edition cost 5d, and featured a special article by Westward board member Daphne du Maurier. Many Westward personalities, such as announcer Sheila Kennedy, also contributed articles to the magazine. As part of the 1968 franchise round, the ITA created Independent Television Publications (ITP), and Westward's weekly listings would be obliged to appear solely in the local edition of the national listings magazine TVTimes, which was published by ITP.

=== Local programming ===
Westward Television had a dual policy for its local programming: it produced a wide range of programmes of particular interest to the south-west's rural and agricultural communities, whilst simultaneously producing programming designed to stimulate its audience's interest in new areas.

One of the best known programmes was Treasure Hunt, a game show presented by Kenneth Horne and Keith Fordyce, among others, which ran for 14 years and at one stage featured Jethro as the pirate co-host.

==== News and current affairs ====
By 1969, Westward had more than 100 correspondents across the region, reporting newsworthy local events, and eight film cameramen who would travel the region gathering footage and compiling reports. The flagship programme was Westward Diary, which began as a regional magazine programme broadcast three times a week (Mondays, Wednesdays and Fridays) between 6:15 pm and 7 pm. Originally, there were three presenters – Barry Westwood, Reginald Bosanquet and Kenneth MacLeod – who rotated on a weekly basis. The regional news was contained in a separate ten-minute Westward News bulletin, broadcast every weekday at 6.05 pm, and subsequently supplemented by afternoon and late-night bulletins.

Westward Diary was soon merged with Westward News, to become what was known at the time as a 'regional news magazine', and was broadcast every weekday between 6.00 pm and 6:30 pm. Kenneth MacLeod was asked to present the new programme permanently. The news would be read by the duty announcer, so MacLeod's role on the Diary was not as a newsreader but a presenter holding the whole package together.

The weeknightly Westward Diary had two halves, separated by a commercial break. The first half concentrated on the regional news, whereas the second half included other items of interest to local viewers. A number of experts would visit to present regular features: Ted Tuckerman would present a fishing spot called Tight Lines, Jon Miller (the zoologist, and also presenter of Southern Television's How) would present a spot about nature, architect David Young would examine local architecture of interest, and Topline Broadhurst would present regular gardening spots. There was a regular spot called Help! for charity and voluntary groups; a slot called Pick of the Post in which viewers' letters would be read; and the popular Picture Puzzle, in which viewers had to try to guess the location shown in a photograph taken somewhere in the South West).

Westward staff returned to work a few days before the end of the ITV national strike of 1979. Kenneth MacLeod had to present Westward Diary in what looked to viewers like almost total darkness, as the union permitted only the house lights to be switched on in the studio.

In the early 1970s, A Date With Danton was a stand-alone weekly programme that provided a round-up of local arts and entertainment events. This later became a spot entitled "What's On", in Friday's edition of Westward Diary. The Friday edition of Sports Desk was a stand-alone programme in the early '70s, but this too became part of the Diary towards the end of the decade. To accommodate this, the length of Friday's edition of Diary was extended to an hour, and it occasionally featured a live studio audience. Westward was one of the first ITV regions to broadcast a late-evening regional news bulletin (Westward Late News).

The local weather forecast in Westward Diary, with an emphasis on specialist information for fishermen and farmers, was given by a popular local personality, Graham Danton, who presented several programmes for Westward, including Holiday Times, an events listings programme aimed at people holiday-making in the region, and Late With Danton, a consumer programme.

On April Fools' Day, 1973, Westward broadcast a film about the village of Spiggot, which had boycotted decimalisation and were still using pre-decimal currency. Many viewers wrote to Westward in support of the villagers' stance, oblivious to the date the film was broadcast.

==== Children ====
An early programme for young people was Spin Along, a regional pop music programme presented by disc-jockey Alan Freeman. The first edition was broadcast on Tuesday 12 September 1961 at 6:15pm, in place of Westward Diary. A second series began on 24 September 1962 and moved to 7pm.

Another local music programme was Move Over Dad. In November 1963 The Beatles had to be smuggled into Derry's Cross through a tunnel to record an interview with continuity announcer Stuart Hutchison for the programme, due to the number of fans outside the studios.

Other 60s music programmes included Pop And Leslie and The Westward Beat Competition from 1964. The Westward Beat Competition had a panel of judges that included Brian Epstein and Dick Rowe and was won by The Rustiks.

In 1969, Angela Rippon joined Westward from BBC South West, as a producer of children's and women's programmes; she also produced a monthly show during the summer of 1972 which laid claim to being the first "Open Access" TV show for young people in the UK. This was called The Show Without A Title, and was the brainchild of the station's then Programme Controller Terry Fleet. The monthly show was presented by members of an editorial team that included David Rodgers, who later went on to become a familiar Westward TV staff presenter. Angela Rippon was the programme's Editor, with Roger Gage being its director. The show's run (which was broadcast at 5.20pm on Fridays after being pre-recorded in Studio One on the preceding Wednesday) was short-lived. A year later, in 1973, another series aimed at young people called Young Eyes took to the Westward TV airwaves; this was co-presented by Andy Price and the actress Lesley Manville. David Rodgers was again one of the regular contributors.

Another popular long-running programme featured a puppet rabbit, Gus Honeybun, who appeared with the duty announcer who read out birthday greetings to the region's children: The story went that Gus was found wandering Dartmoor by a Westward Outside Broadcast unit. Children could request that Gus waggle his ears, wink, stand on his head, count their age in "bunny-hops", or turn off the lights. Gus's behaviour tended to be excellent for Roger Shaw, but for Judi Spiers and Iain Stirling he could be rather unpredictable. Gus was retained by TSW when they took over the franchise.

On Sunday mornings, Westward aired Look and See, a five-minute religious slot for the under-8s broadcast from the continuity studio. Its presenters included Norah Thomas, Jill Mapson, Pat Webber and Ann Davey. As with most other ITV companies, the station also produced a nightly Epilogue under the title of Faith for Life, produced largely from the continuity studio.

In 1980, Westward produced Maggie's Moor, a seven part networked children's drama series about a young girl living on Dartmoor during the Second World War. It starred Tamar le Bailly as Maggie and was produced and directed by John King, the father of wildlife photographer and presenter Simon King, who featured as "The Buzzard Boy" in Episode 5.

==== Agriculture ====
Agriculture was an important industry in South West England during Westward Television's franchise. Approximately 80% of land in South West England is in agricultural use (19.6% of England's total). Westward TV had an Agricultural Advisory committee chaired by R. G. Pomeroy to advise the company on its agricultural output. For nine months of the year, Westward broadcast Farming News (later retitled Farm and Country News) on Sunday lunchtimes presented and edited by Peter Forde. Westward also produced an adult education series aimed at farmers called Acres For Profit.

== Network contributions ==
Westward's contributions to the network were very rare at first, mainly consisting of one-off programmes and editions of the Morning Service (later renamed Morning Worship).

Initially, Westward had an arrangement with ABC Weekend Television (ABC) to provide its network programming. As Channel Television took its network feed from Stockland Hill, this obliged Channel to affiliate to ABC. These 'affiliate' arrangements lasted until they were abolished in the 1964 franchise round. Westward also had an arrangement with Associated TeleVision (ATV), to play out any networked Westward programmes onto the ITV network.

On 19 January 1972, there was a relaxation on the restrictions of broadcast hours that had been set by the Minister of Posts and Telecommunications. This allowed regular daytime programming on weekday afternoons, and weekday morning programming during out-of-school term time. These extra off-peak hours gave smaller ITV companies a chance to provide some networked or part-networked programmes. By the mid '70s, Westward had taken advantage of this opportunity by finding a small niche producing adult education programmes for the ITV network. These included the series Westcountry Fayre (cookery), Freeze! (freezing food) and Keep Britain Slim (slimming).

=== About Britain ===
One of the new daytime weekday programmes introduced through the relaxation of broadcast hours was About Britain. This strand was made up of half-hour documentaries contributed by each of the ITV regions covering interesting aspects of their respective regions.

In 1973 the Countryside Commission opened the South West Coast Peninsula Walk from Minehead in Somerset to Swanage in Dorset via Land's End. Westward Television asked Diary reporter Clive Gunnell to walk the new route and film his journey.

Clive was a Londoner. He had begun his television career as a props man at Associated-Rediffusion, where he first met Kenneth MacLeod. He had already walked the new Two Moors Walk from Plymouth to Lynmouth and filmed his journey for Westward Diary. This had proved popular and led to the new series Walking Westward.

Clive Gunnell set off from Weston-super-Mare rather than Minehead, and his journey took many series to complete. It took five series before he reached the south coast. Westward used a selection of Clive's films as part of their contribution to About Britain, and due to its network exposure Walking Westward remains one of Westward Television's best remembered programmes. Fifteen-minute sections of Clive Gunnell's walk along the Cornish coast were broadcast by the US Public Broadcasting Service as curtain raisers to the BBC's original version of Poldark in PBS's Masterpiece Theatre series.

Clive Gunnell also made documentaries about inland areas that were also contributed to About Britain. In 1977 his documentary To Tavistock Goosie Fair won "Most Outstanding Regional Production of 1977". In 1980 he began work on a series of six films on Dartmoor called Dartmoor. Some of these films were featured in the About Britain strand in 1981.

=== Doing Things ===
Like About Britain, Doing Things was a series of half-hour filmed documentaries contributed by the various ITV regions and broadcast in the early afternoon. It was broadcast in 1973–74 and looked at hobbies. Westward Television contributed Beachcombing, a film presented and directed by Clive Gunnell, to this series.

== See also ==
- Television South West
- Westcountry Television
- History of ITV

== Bibliography ==
- Croston, Eric (Ed.) (January 1976). TV and Radio 1976. London: Independent Broadcasting Authority. ISBN 0-900485-21-3.
- Howett, Dicky (Autumn, 1994). "Television Simply Wonderful". 405 Alive, issue 23 p. 25–28.
- Sendall, Bernard Independent Television in Britain: Volume 1 – Origin and Foundation, 1946–62 London: The Macmillan Press Ltd 1982 (1984 reprint)

ITV regional service
New service	South West England; 29 April 1961 – 31 December 1981	Succeeded by TSW
