= BBC South West =

BBC services in South West England

- BBC South West's area within the UK
- TV transmitters: Beacon Hill; Caradon Hill; Frémont Point; Huntshaw Cross; Redruth; Stockland Hill
- Radio stations: BBC Radio Guernsey; BBC Radio Cornwall; BBC Radio Devon; BBC Radio Somerset; BBC Radio Solent; BBC Radio Jersey
- Headquarters: Plymouth
- Area: Cornwall; Devon; West Somerset parts of Taunton Deane; West Dorset (including Weymouth and Isle of Portland); Channel Islands
- Nation: BBC English Regions
- Key people: Leo Devine (Head of Regional & Local Programmes)
- Official website: https://news.bbc.co.uk/local/hi/default.stm

BBC South West is the BBC English Region serving Cornwall (including the Isles of Scilly), Devon, West Somerset, West Dorset and the Channel Islands.

== Services ==
=== Television ===
BBC South West's television service (broadcast on BBC One South West) consists of the flagship regional news service Spotlight, the opt-out service BBC Channel Islands, and a 20-minute opt-out during Sunday Politics.

BBC South West covers Cornwall, Channel Islands, Devon, West Dorset and West Somerset.

Due to the size of West Dorset, the listenership of BBC Radio Solent is covered by both BBC South and BBC South West.

=== Radio ===
The region is the controlling centre for BBC Radio Devon, BBC Radio Cornwall, BBC Radio Somerset, BBC Radio Jersey and BBC Radio Guernsey.

On weekdays, the five stations carry local programming between 5 am and 7 pm before joining together for networked programming between 7 pm and closedown at 1 am. Weekend evening programmes are also simulcast with stations in the BBC West region.

=== Online and Interactive ===
BBC South West also produces regional news & local radio pages for BBC Red Button and BBC Local websites for each county.

== History ==
=== Television ===
BBC South West began a regional television service on 20 April 1961 (nine days before the first broadcast of the rival ITV station, Westward Television) with ten-minute news bulletins on weekdays, originally presented by Tom Salmon. A year later, the bulletin was expanded and relaunched as the news magazine programme South West at Six (hosted by Sheila Tracy) before being renamed again on 30 September 1963 as Spotlight South West.

An opt-out for the Channel Islands was introduced during the 1990s, beginning with short bulletins after the Nine O'Clock News on weeknights, presented from a small studio at the Frémont Point transmitter. The service was expanded on 16 October 2000 and now incorporates the first half of Spotlight's main 6:30pm programme (under the name BBC Channel Islands News) and the full late bulletin after the BBC News at Ten on weeknights. The service is now based at the studios of BBC Radio Jersey in St Helier.

Following the merger of Westcountry and HTV West to become ITV West & Westcountry in February 2009 (later becoming "ITV West Country" on 1 January 2014), Spotlight is now the only regional TV news service dedicated entirely to, and produced in, the South West, as the ITV service (ITV News West Country) is based in Bristol with bulletins and opt-outs for the region. ITV Channel Television continues to produce and broadcast its own dedicated local news service for the Channel Islands from its studios near St Helier in Jersey.

== Studios ==
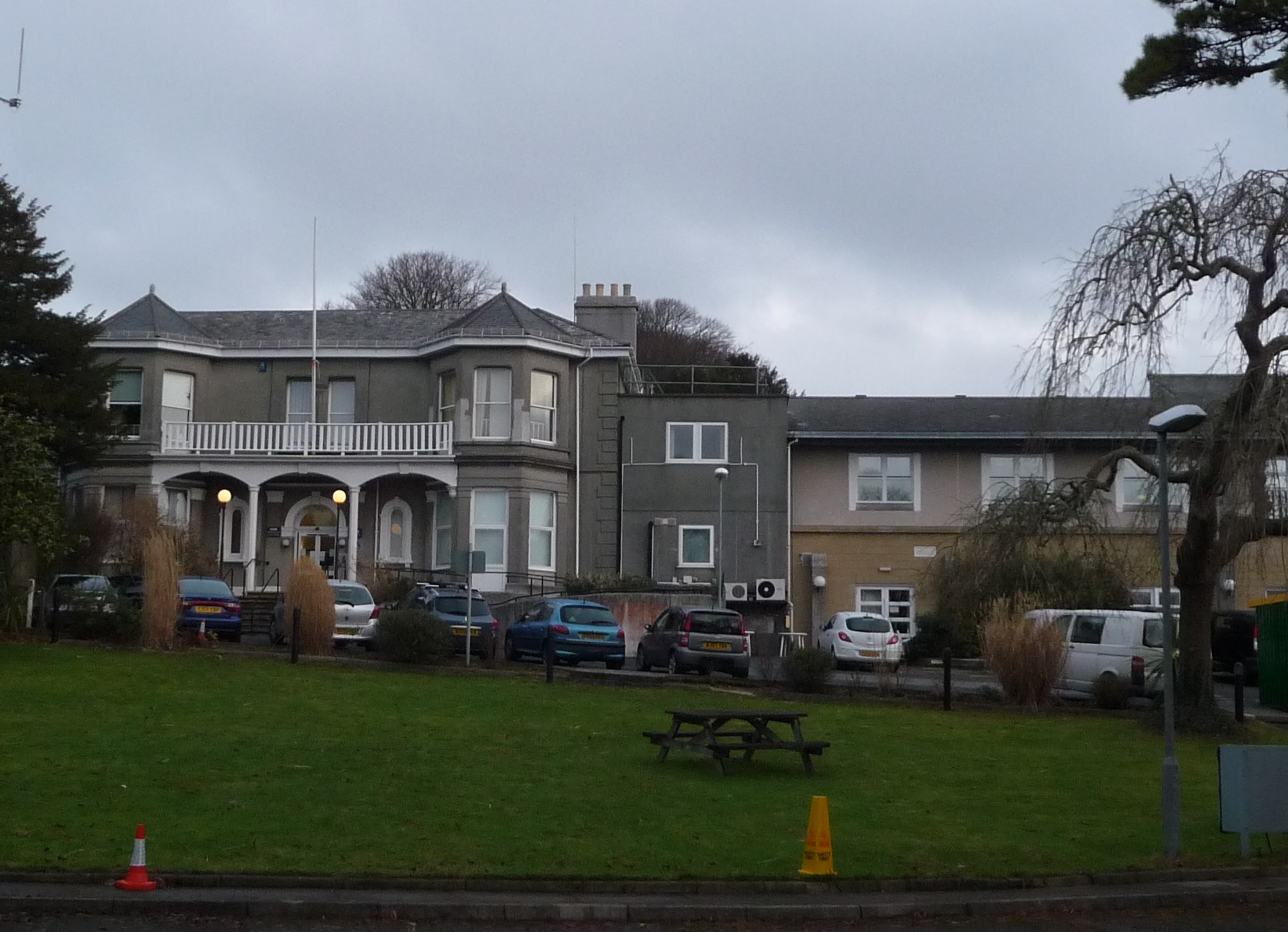
Broadcasting House, Plymouth

The regional headquarters and television centre is at Broadcasting House in the Mannamead area of Plymouth, with offices and television studios also in St Helier, Saint Peter Port, Dorchester, Taunton, Truro and Exeter.

The Plymouth studios were originally a Victorian villa on Seymour Road called Ingledene before being bought by the BBC following the Second World War and subsequently fitted out with technical facilities. A new colour television studio was added to the complex in 1974, allowing Spotlight to broadcast in colour for the first time. The studios were due to close in late 2011, with BBC South West moving to a new purpose-built broadcasting centre on the banks of Sutton Harbour, opposite the Barbican in Plymouth city centre. The move stalled, however, due to a developer pulling out of the project and the effect of the recession on the construction industry. In late 2012, the owner of the harbour expressed fears the move may never happen and admitted other parties had expressed an interest in moving to the site earmarked for the BBC. In 2013, the BBC confirmed it would not be moving to Sutton Harbour, but instead be refurbishing its existing Plymouth headquarters. The studios in St Helier, Jersey are used for the opt out Channel Islands news bulletins.

== See also ==
- BBC English Regions
- BBC Radio Devon
- BBC Radio Cornwall
- BBC Radio Jersey
- BBC Radio Guernsey
- BBC Radio Somerset
- BBC Radio Solent
