= Caradon Hill transmitting station =

Broadcasting and telecommunications facility

Caradon Hill
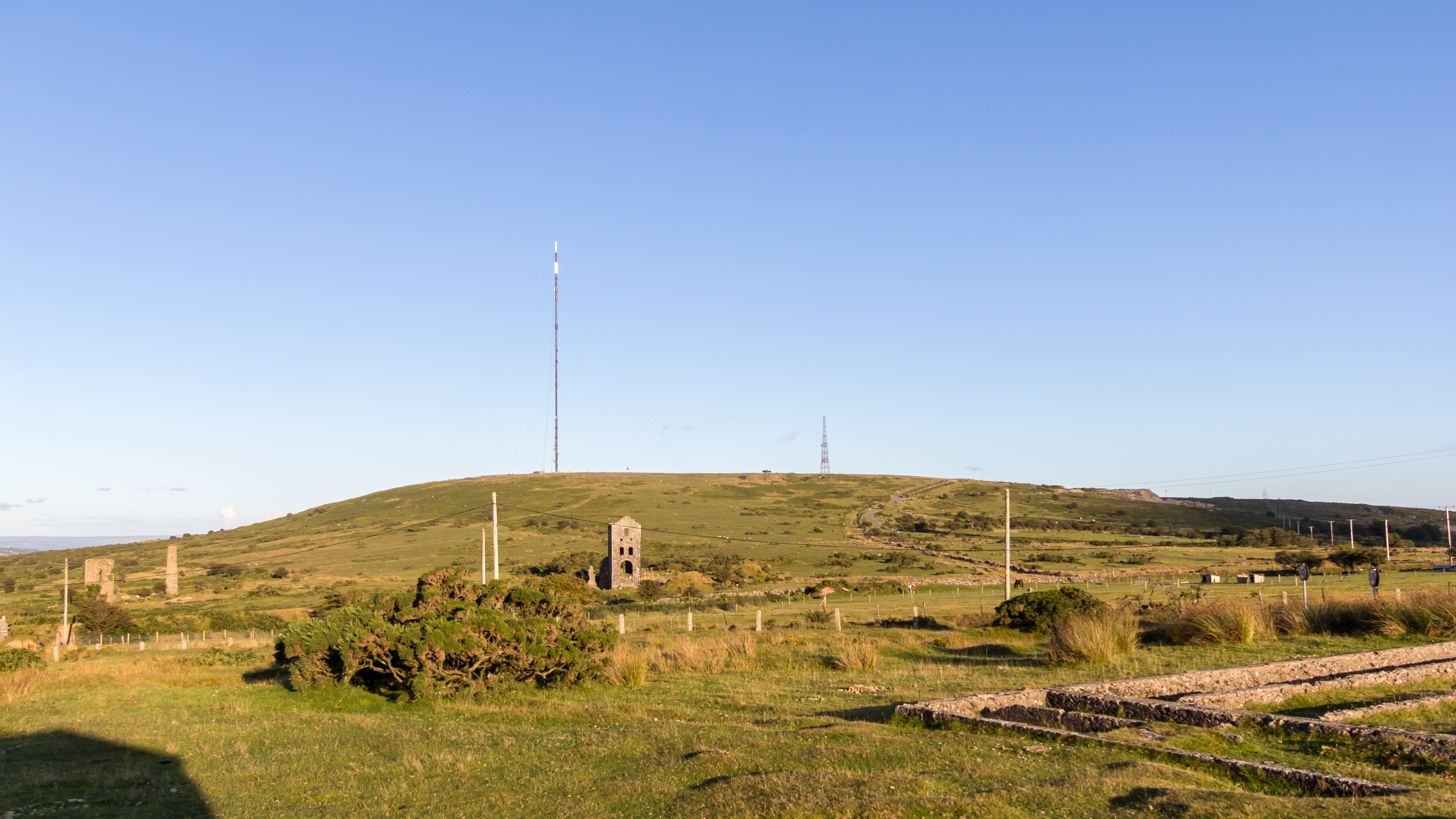
- Caradon Hill mast and towers

- Location within Cornwall
- Mast height: 237.7 metres (780 ft)
- Coordinates: 50.511389°N 4.436667°W
- Grid reference: SX273707
- Built: 1961
- BBC region: BBC South West
- ITV region: ITV West Country

The Caradon Hill transmitting station is a broadcasting and telecommunications facility on Bodmin Moor in the civil parish of Linkinhorne, located on Caradon Hill, Cornwall, England, United Kingdom. It is 4 miles (6.4 km) north of Liskeard, and 3/4 mile (1.2 km) south-east of Minions, the highest village in Cornwall (grid reference SX273707). Built in 1961, the station includes a 237.7 metres (780 ft) guyed steel lattice mast. The mean height for the television antennas is 603 metres (1,978 ft) above sea level. The site has a smaller towers used for telecommunications and a wireless internet signal. It is owned and operated by Arqiva.

The South Caradon Copper Mine, 1,000 yards (0.91 km) to the SW of the transmitter, was the largest copper mine in the UK in its heyday, 150 years ago. Many other copper, tin and granite mines are scattered around the base of the hill.

== History ==
The station was built in 1961 by the Independent Television Authority to bring ITV to South West England for the first time. Inaugural broadcasts were from the ITV franchise holder for the area, Westward Television. 405-line monochrome transmissions were on channel 12, Band III VHF. The station was also the first in the area to broadcast television using Band III.

In 1969 it was chosen to become a main station in the new colour UHF television network, broadcasting BBC1, BBC2 and Westward Television. Both the UHF and VHF services continued in tandem until 1985, when VHF television was discontinued in the UK.

In 1992 Caradon Hill (along with Redruth) was chosen as the site of the first commercial radio broadcasts in Cornwall, with Pirate FM taking to the air on 3 April of that year.

=== 1973 aircraft incident ===
On 27 March 1973, Hunter 'XG256', of 79 Squadron, hit the supports and crashed. The pilot, 23 year old Flying Officer Richard Pearson, safely ejected, and was taken to a local hospital.

== Coverage ==
Caradon Hill covers east and central Cornwall, from Truro and Falmouth in the west to Plymouth and Bude in the east. It also reaches into north and west Devon, as far as Barnstaple, Okehampton and Salcombe.

== Digital switchover ==
Digital switchover began at Caradon Hill in the early hours of 12 August 2009. At approximately 1.15am the analogue BBC Two signal was switched off. The other analogue signals (BBC One, ITV and Channel 4) along with digital Multiplex 1 were then temporarily switched off in sequence. Between one and two hours later the analogue BBC One, ITV and Channel 4 signals were restored in sequence along with Multiplex 1 which was moved from UHF 34 to UHF 28 – analogue BBC Two's frequency.

The rest of the analogue signals were switched off permanently just after midnight on 9 September 2009. Once the digital signals were reshuffled to take advantage of the space left by the switched off analogue signals, they were then brought up to full power (digital signals were broadcast at a much lower power pre-switchover). This completed Caradon Hill's switchover to digital. This also completed the West Country region's digital switchover.

== Freeview HD ==
Freeview HD became available on UHF 22 on 11 June 2010. All four main HD channels – BBC HD, BBC One HD, ITV1 HD and Channel 4 HD – are available.

== Channels listed by frequency ==
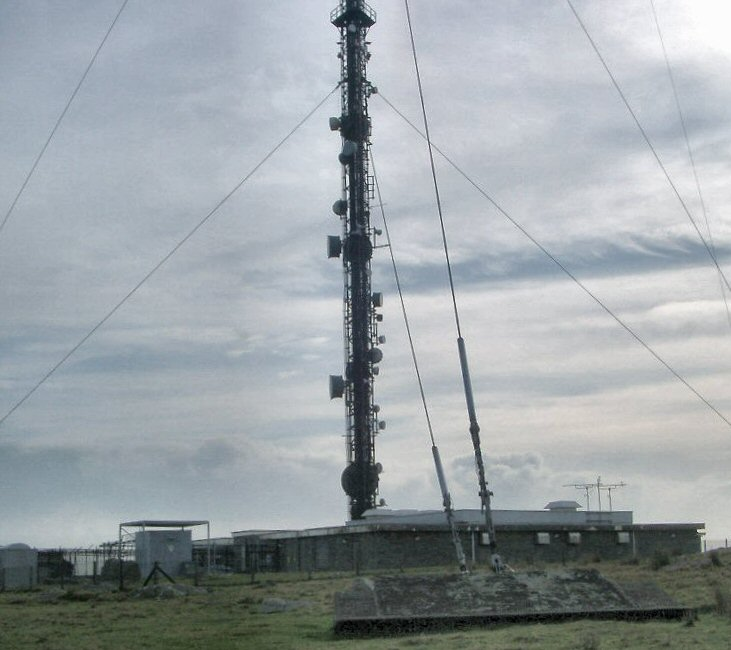
Main mast and building

=== Analogue radio (FM VHF) ===
Frequency	kW	Service
95.2 MHz	4.3	BBC Radio Cornwall
102.2 MHz	2.5	Greatest Hits Radio
105.1 MHz	2.5	Heart West

=== Digital radio (DAB) ===
Frequency	Block	kW	Operator
216.928 MHz	11A	TBC	SDL National
218.640 MHz	11B	5	Cornwall
222.064 MHz	11D	2	D1 National
225.648 MHz	12B	2.5	BBC National DAB

=== Digital television ===
Frequency	UHF	kW	Operator	System
474.166 MHz	21+	50	SDN	DVB-T
482.166 MHz	22+	100	BBC B	DVB-T2
497.833 MHz	24-	50	Arqiva A	DVB-T
506.166 MHz	25+	100	Digital 3&4	DVB-T
521.833 MHz	27-	50	Arqiva B	DVB-T
530.166 MHz	28+	100	BBC A	DVB-T

==== Before switchover ====
Frequency	UHF	kW	Operator
474.000 MHz	21	4	BBC (Mux B)
497.833 MHz	24-	4	Arqiva (Mux C)
522.000 MHz	27	4	Arqiva (Mux D)
553.833 MHz	31-	4	Digital 3&4 (Mux 2)
578.000 MHz	34	5	BBC (Mux 1)
690.000 MHz	48	4	SDN (Mux A)

=== Additional Digital Television ===
Prior to 19 June 2019, Caradon Hill used to broadcast two additional multiplexes. This is due to the clearance of the 700 MHz frequency band.

Frequency	UHF	kW	Operator	System
554.000 MHz	31	11.57	COM7 HD	DVB-T2
602.000 MHz	37	1.9	COM8 HD	DVB-T2

=== Analogue television ===
Analogue television is no longer transmitted from Caradon Hill. BBC2 was closed on 12 August 2009 and the remaining three services on 9 September.

Frequency	UHF	kW	Service
479.25 MHz	22	500	BBC1 South West
503.25 MHz	25	500	Westcountry
527.25 MHz	28	500	BBC2 South West
559.25 MHz	32	500	Channel 4

== See also ==
- List of masts
- List of tallest buildings and structures in Great Britain
- Redruth transmitting station
- North Hessary Tor transmitting station
