= Beacon Hill transmitting station =

Radio and television transmitters in Devon, England

Beacon Hill
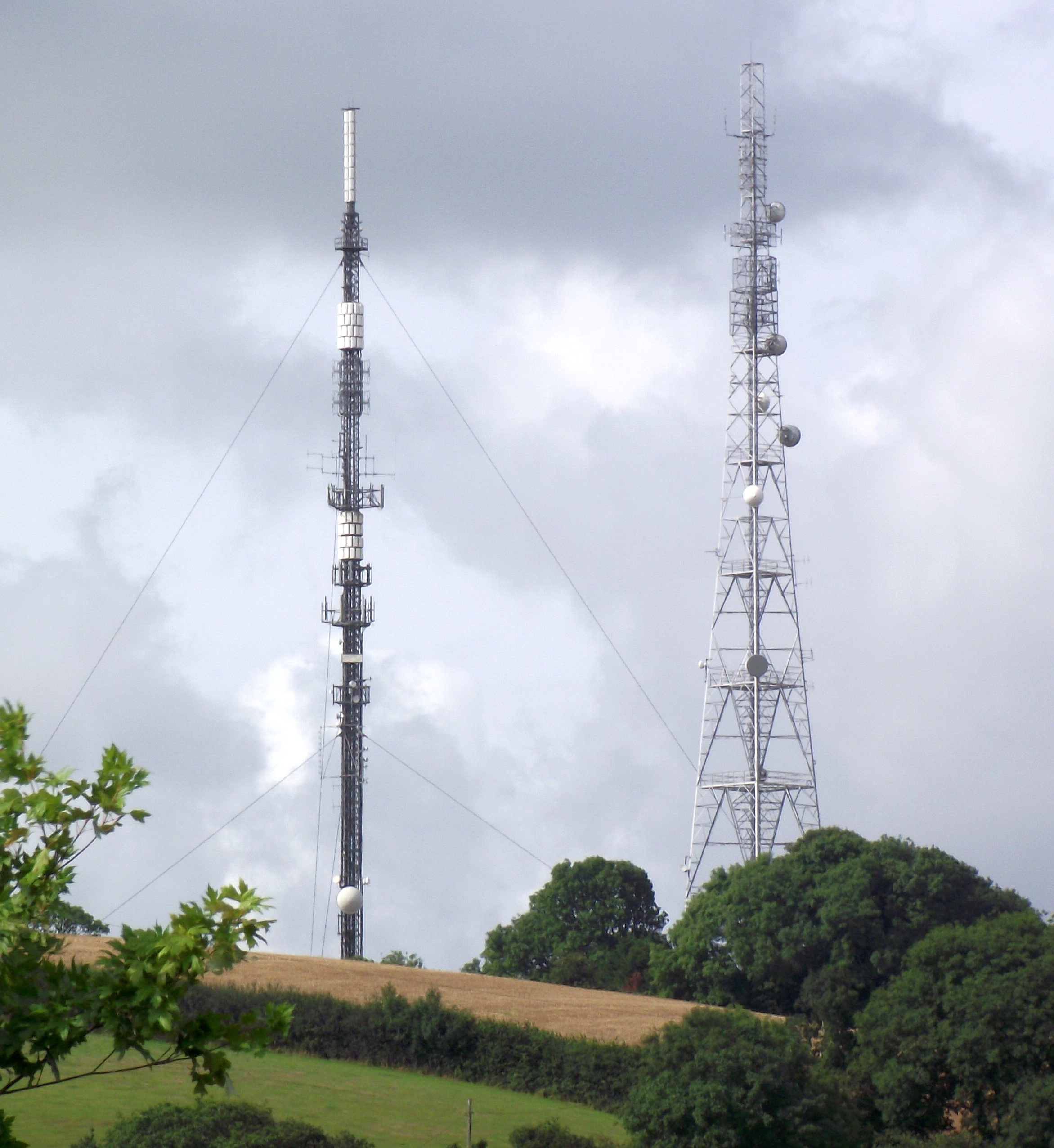
- Beacon Hill A (left) and Beacon Hill B

- Location within Devon
- Mast height: 103.6 metres (340 ft)
- Coordinates: 50.446389°N 3.610833°W
- Grid reference: SX857619
- BBC region: BBC South West
- ITV region: ITV West Country

The Beacon Hill transmitting station is an English telecommunications facility located at Beacon Hill, Marldon, Devon. It includes a guyed mast (Beacon Hill A) and a free-standing lattice tower (Beacon Hill B), both of which support various antennas.

== History ==
Beacon Hill A became operational in 1972–3, bringing 625 line PAL colour television to the coverage area of Torbay and south Devon. Beacon Hill B transmits FM radio and DAB radio to the area. In 2007, a third guyed lattice mast was constructed at the site to provide medium wave transmissions for Gold (Exeter/Torbay). The transmitter for Gold was dismantled after the service was discontinued.

=== Digital switchover ===
In April 2009, the analogue television transmissions at Beacon Hill A were turned off, requiring homes in the area to switch to the Freeview service. The Beacon Hill transmitter group was the first in the South West of England to stop broadcasting analogue television services. BBC Two ceased at 00:50 on 8 April 2009 and the remaining analogue signals were turned off on 22 April 2009 at 00:20.

== Services listed by frequency ==
=== Analogue radio ===
Frequency	kW	Service
88.7 MHz	1	BBC Radio 2
90.9 MHz	1	BBC Radio 3
93.1 MHz	1	BBC Radio 4
96.4 MHz	1.8	Heart West
98.4 MHz	1	BBC Radio 1
104.3 MHz	1	BBC Radio Devon
105.5 MHz	1.6	Greatest Hits Radio Devon

=== Digital radio ===
Frequency	Block	kW	Operator
220.352 MHz	11C	2	NOW Exeter and Torbay
222.064 MHz	11D	2	Digital One
225.648 MHz	12B	5	BBC National DAB

=== Digital television ===
Frequency	UHF	kW	Operator	System
626.000 MHz	40	10	Arqiva B	DVB-T
634.000 MHz	41	20	Digital 3&4	DVB-T
642.000 MHz	42	10	SDN	DVB-T
658.000 MHz	44	20	BBC A	DVB-T
666.000 MHz	45	10	Arqiva A	DVB-T
682.000 MHz	47	20	BBC B	DVB-T2

==== 700MHz clearance ====
The 700MHz clearance programme led to the removal of some of the Freeview HD and SD channels from the Beacon Hill transmitter. Prior to 27 March 2019, Beacon Hill used to transmit these services:

Frequency	UHF	kW	Operator	System
570.000 MHz	33	7.3	COM7	DVB-T2
578.000 MHz	34	1	COM8	DVB-T2

==== Before switchover ====
Frequency	UHF	kW	Operator
721.833 MHz	52-	2	BBC (Mux 1)
738.166 MHz	54+	2	BBC (Mux B)
753.833 MHz	56-	1	Arqiva (Mux C)
770.166 MHz	58+	2	SDN (Mux A)
794.166 MHz	61+	2	Digital 3&4 (Mux 2)
818.166 MHz	64+	1	Arqiva (Mux D)

=== Analogue television ===
Analogue television signals ceased in April 2009. BBC2 was closed on 8 April 2009, with ITV Westcountry temporarily moving into its place, followed by the remaining services on 22 April.

Frequency	UHF	kW	Service
727.25 MHz	53	100	Channel 4
759.25 MHz	57	100	BBC1 South West
783.25 MHz	60	100	Westcountry
807.25 MHz	63	100	BBC2 South West
