= Redruth transmitting station =

Transmitter station in Cornwall, England

There are three Redruth transmitting stations:

== Redruth (Four Lanes) ==
Redruth (Four Lanes)
- Location within Cornwall
- Mast height: 173 metres (568 ft)
- Coordinates: 50.209722°N 5.238611°W
- Built: 1964
- BBC region: BBC South West
- ITV region: ITV West Country

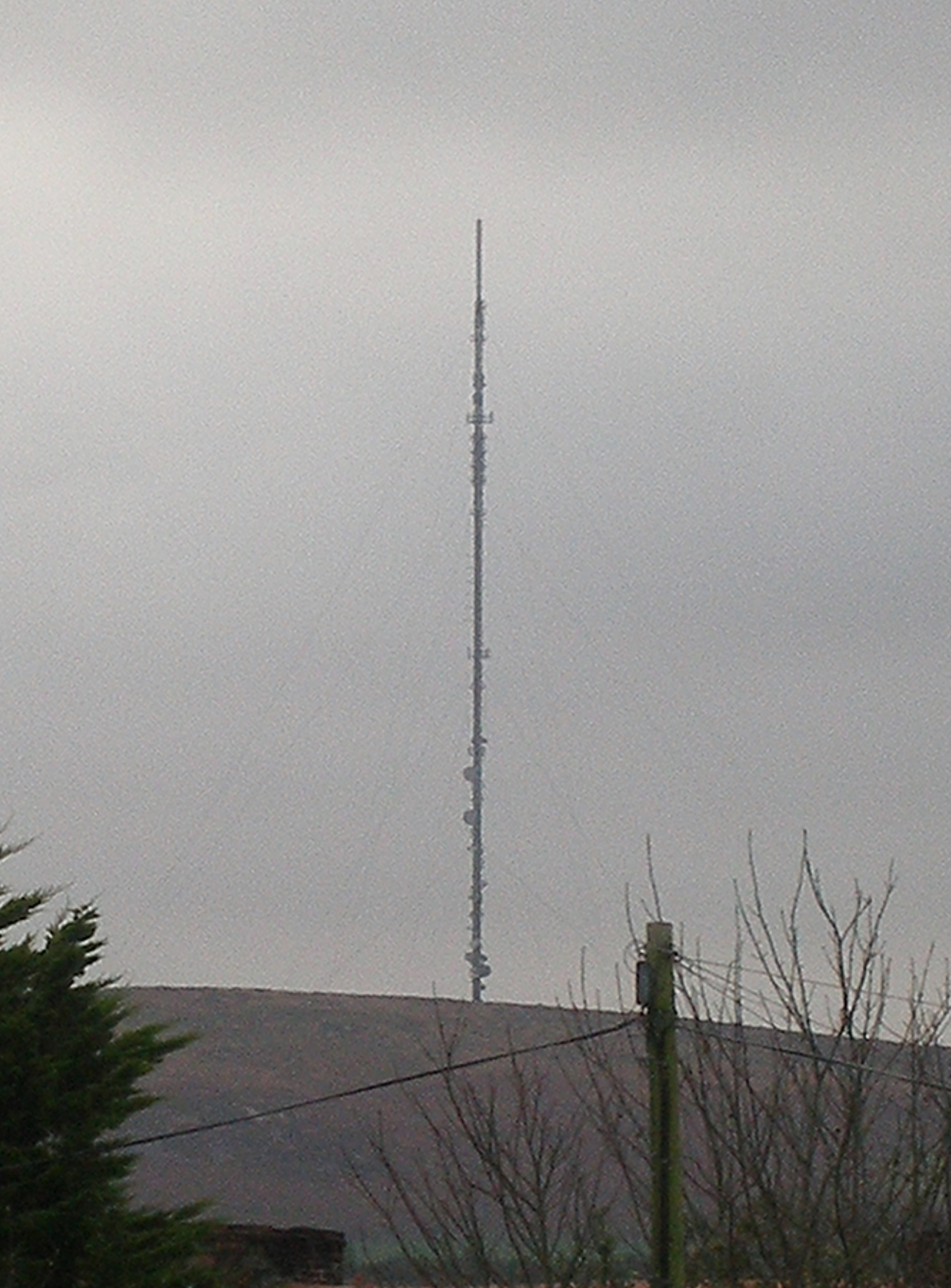
The Redruth/Four Lanes Transmitter.

A broadcasting and telecommunications facility in west Cornwall (grid reference SW690395, 50°12′35″N 5°14′19″W). It includes a 152.4 metres (500 ft) high guyed steel lattice mast with square cross section, which is surmounted by the television transmitting antennas, bringing the overall height of the structure to 173 metres (568 ft). It is owned and operated by Arqiva. It transmits DVB television, FM radio and DAB radio (and previously, UHF Analogue television signals). It is sometimes referred to as Four Lanes, because of the proximity of the mast to neighbouring village of the same name. The main mast is lit with four bright red aircraft warning lights, a statutory requirement of the Civil Aviation Authority.

This transmitter provides coverage to West Cornwall and the Isles of Scilly.

== Redruth (Lanner Hill) ==
A decommissioned broadcasting transmitter at Lanner Hill (grid reference SW709403, 50°13′4″N 5°12′45″W). It previously transmit mediumwave radio signals until it was turned off on 31 July 2026. It was built in 1942 by German POWs. It is sometimes referred to as Redruth MF, short for Redruth Medium Frequency (Medium Wave). Prior to its closure, it was owned and run by Arqiva.

== Redruth (Carnmenellis) ==
A microwave transmitting tower located on the hill, Carnmenellis, 2 miles (3.2 km) south of Redruth. It is owned and run by BT.

== Services available ==
=== Analogue radio (MW, ceased) ===
Frequency	kW	Previous service	Switch off date
630 kHz	2	BBC Radio Cornwall	2 March 2020
756 kHz	2	BBC Radio 4	15 April 2024
909 kHz	2	BBC Radio 5 Live	31 July 2026
1089 kHz	2	Talksport	10 February 2020
1215 kHz	2	Absolute Radio	5 June 2018

=== Analogue radio (FM/VHF) ===
Frequency	kW	Service
89.7 MHz	25	BBC Radio 2
91.9 MHz	25	BBC Radio 3
94.1 MHz	25	BBC Radio 4
99.3 MHz	25	BBC Radio 1
101.5 MHz	2 (H); 8 (V)	Classic FM
102.8 MHz	10.8	Greatest Hits Radio
103.9 MHz	18	BBC Radio Cornwall
107.0 MHz	10.69	Heart West

=== Digital radio (DAB) ===
Frequency	Block	kW	Operator
218.640 MHz	11B	0.65	NOW Cornwall
222.064 MHz	11D	1.5	Digital One
225.648 MHz	12B	2	BBC National DAB

=== Digital television ===
Frequency	UHF	kW	Operator	System
562.000 MHz	32	10	Arqiva B	DVB-T
570.000 MHz	33	10	Arqiva A	DVB-T
634.166 MHz	41+	20	Digital 3&4	DVB-T
658.166 MHz	44+	20	BBC A	DVB-T
682.000 MHz	47	20	BBC B	DVB-T2
690.000 MHz	48	10	SDN	DVB-T

==== Before switchover ====
Frequency	UHF	kW	Operator
618.000 MHz	39	1.6	BBC (Mux 1)
642.166 MHz	42+	1.6	Digital 3&4 (Mux 2)
650.166 MHz	43+	1.6	Arqiva (Mux C)
666.166 MHz	45+	1.6	SDN (Mux A)
697.833 MHz	49-	1.6	BBC (Mux B)
705.833 MHz	50-	2.2	Arqiva (Mux D)

=== Analogue television ===
Analogue television is no longer transmitted from Redruth. BBC Two was closed on 8 July 2009 and the remaining four services on 5 August.

Frequency	UHF	kW	Service
599.25 MHz	37	3	Channel 5
631.25 MHz	41	100	Westcountry
655.25 MHz	44	100	BBC2 South West
679.25 MHz	47	100	Channel 4
711.25 MHz	51	100	BBC1 South West

== See also ==
- List of radio stations in the United Kingdom
- List of tallest structures in the United Kingdom
- List of tallest structures in the world
- Caradon Hill transmitting station
