= ITV Westcountry =

Former ITV franchise holder for the south west of England

- Final logo, used from 2006 to 2013

- The ITV Westcountry region when its franchise ended in 2013
- Type: Region of television network
- Branding: ITV1
- Country: United Kingdom
- First air date: 1 January 1993; 33 years ago
- Founded: 19 October 1991; 34 years ago (company)
- TV transmitters: Stockland Hill, Huntshaw Cross, Caradon Hill, Redruth, Beacon Hill
- Headquarters: Plymouth
- Broadcast area: South West England
- Owner: ITV plc
- Dissolved: 27 October 2002; 23 years ago (lost on-air identity); 13 February 2009; 17 years ago (two regions separated); 31 December 2013; 12 years ago (franchise) (after 22 years, 73 days)
- Former names: Westcountry Television; Carlton Westcountry; ITV1 Carlton for the Westcountry; ITV1 for the Westcountry
- Picture format: 1080i HDTV, downscaled to 16:9 576i for SDTV
- Affiliation: ITV
- Language: English
- Replaced: TSW
- Replaced by: ITV West Country

ITV Westcountry, formerly known as Westcountry Television and Carlton Westcountry, was the ITV franchise holder for the South West of England, covering Cornwall (including the Isles of Scilly), Devon, southern and western Somerset and western Dorset. The company replaced its predecessor, TSW (Television South West), from 1 January 1993. The station was owned and operated by ITV plc under the licensee of ITV Broadcasting Limited (formerly Westcountry Television Limited).

ITV West Country incorporating the former ITV Westcountry ("West") and ITV West ("East") regions was (until 31 December 2013) a non-franchise ITV regional station covering South West England. With the formal split of the Wales and West Channel 3 licence in January 2014, a separate licence was created for Wales with the West licence merged with that of West Country. ITV West Country thus became a franchise region. Both companies which make up the new regional licence still legally exist. ITV Wales & West Ltd (until 14 January 2025), ITV Wales & West Group Ltd (until 7 February 2023) and Westcountry Television Ltd (until 14 January 2025) are each, along with most other regional companies owned by ITV plc, listed on www.companieshouse.gov.uk as a "dormant company". This article however, covers the Westcountry Television part of the franchise.

== History ==
=== Franchise award ===
Westcountry Television was one of two rival consortia bidding against the incumbent TSW when the ITV franchises were put to tender early in 1991. Two of Westcountry's original shareholders were Brittany Ferries and South West Water; the latter investor attracted criticism as only three years earlier it had been responsible for one of the worst water pollution incidents in the United Kingdom and which had occurred within the franchise area at Camelford. On 16 October 1991, Westcountry was announced as the winner, bidding £7 million a year against TSW's bid of £16 million a year. Several local MPs were concerned that South West Water's involvement would lead to partiality in news items concerning the local water firm.

TSW launched a legal challenge to the franchise award, and after initially being refused permission to do so in the High Court, a legal action began which would last almost three months and went all the way to the House of Lords. In February 1992 the legal process found in favour of Westcountry and while it could now finally sign the franchise agreement, its original programme plans were hit by the delay. Following discussions with the Independent Television Commission, Westcountry announced on 1 April 1992 it had abandoned the plans to build new studios on the Plymouth waterfront, opting instead to convert an industrial unit at Langage Science Park, Plymouth. It also reduced its planned staffing levels – already far fewer than those of TSW – leading to an expression of disappointment by TSW's managing director Harry Turner. Of the 297 TSW employees, only 16 found work at Westcountry at the start of the franchise. Around 112 staff were employed by Westcountry at the time of the station's launch.

=== Launch ===
Westcountry replaced TSW at midnight on 1 January 1993 after ITN's Into The New Year bulletin featuring the Westminster clock tower chimes. Technicians switched from the TSW microwave link to Westcountry Television, launching into a two-minute trail voiced by Bruce Hammal and Trish Bertram welcoming viewers to Westcountry, proudly announcing its forthcoming regional programmes. The promo was followed by the Eddie Murphy and Dudley Moore film Best Defense. The new station promised an increase to 11 hours a week of regional programming of mixed genres.

Six months after the launch, the company joined up with Meridian Broadcasting, HTV, Channel Television and S4C to create a joint advertising sales operation.

During the summer of 1996, Westcountry prepared to float the company on the stock market, which resulted in HTV, United News & Media, Carlton Communications and Canwest bidding to buy out Westcountry. In October 1996, GWR (the radio group) made a bid of £70m for Westcountry TV, outbidding both HTV and Carlton, but within a few weeks, United News & Media increased its offer and was expected to acquire the company. But Westcountry owners had become increasingly frustrated at the slow progress of talks and criticised United boss Lord Hollick's "nickel and dime" tactics over negotiations, opting instead to sell to Carlton Communications for £10m higher than United's offer of around £75m, around 25 November 1996. Hollick was described as "disappointed but far from livid" at the outcome. Subsequently, Westcountry was re-branded as Carlton Westcountry on 6 September 1999, although only referred on screen as Carlton. On 27 October 2002, Carlton Westcountry lost its regional identity, and became known as ITV1 Carlton prior to regional programmes only, while being known as ITV1 at all other times. The franchise briefly became ITV1 for the Westcountry on 1 December 2003, before being renamed onscreen as ITV1 Westcountry upon the ITV plc merger of 2004, and officially taking this name two years later. ITV1 Westcountry was used for a time after this, although from 13 November 2006, the regional name was only verbally mentioned before any locally produced programming.

=== ITV West Country ===
Following a speech by Michael Grade about regional broadcasting post-switchover at the 2007 Nations and Regions conference in Cardiff, there was speculation that ITV West and ITV Westcountry could merge news operations, as part of further streamlining of regional operations. Rumours suggested that, while a newsroom (and separate regional identity) would be retained in the south west, the main Westcountry Live programme would move to a studio alongside The West Tonight at ITV West in Bristol (akin to the Meridian and Thames Valley news services at Whiteley). On 12 September 2007, ITV issued a statement to the City of London, saying that it wished to reduce the number of news studios from 17 to just nine. This included merging ITV West with ITV Westcountry to form a non-franchise region, ITV West and Westcountry, from February 2009.

Shortly after the broadcasting regulator OFCOM gave final approval to the changes, the regional news service was phased out with the final broadcast from Plymouth aired on Sunday 15 February 2009. A new programme entitled The West Country Tonight replaced the Westcountry Live on Monday 16 February 2009 but included separate opt-out news bulletins (some of which were pre-recorded depending on the day's news) and weather forecasts for the Westcountry region during the main 6pm programme and in the weekday late bulletin after News at Ten. Separate daytime bulletins for the region were reintroduced in September 2011.

On 14 January 2013, the region became known as ITV West Country. In September 2013, the south west opt-out within the main 6pm news programme ITV News West Country was extended to at least 20 minutes. Separate weekend bulletins were also reintroduced, effectively restoring a full regional news service for the former Westcountry region.

== Studios ==
Westcountry was originally based at Brittany Ferries' offices in Millbay Docks, Plymouth with a view to constructing a purpose-built studio centre on the Plymouth waterfront. However, following the delay caused by TSW's legal proceedings, these plans were scrapped. The company opted instead to convert an industrial unit at Langage Science Park in Plympton, which was backed up by a network of seven local newsrooms and studios in Torbay, Penzance, Truro, Exeter, Barnstaple, Weymouth and Taunton.

Although Westcountry's headquarters were in Plymouth, transmission for the channel was outsourced and run by HTV Wales staff at HTV's presentation centre in Culverhouse Cross, Cardiff with continuity announcers based at the Plymouth studios. This arrangement lasted from the first day of broadcasting until shortly after regional continuity was abandoned in October 2002.

Following the merger to form ITV West Country, most of Westcountry's operations were transferred to HTV's West headquarters in Bristol, where production of the regional news service is now based. The only operation left in Plymouth is a newsroom and sales office, alongside two newsrooms in Truro and Exeter.

== Sub-regions ==
Up until early 2009, Westcountry ran four sub-regional services, each providing short opt-out bulletins for their area during the flagship news programme Westcountry Live and the late bulletin after News at Ten. The opt-outs were broadcast from Westcountry's studios in Barnstaple (covering north Devon), Exeter (serving east Devon and parts of Somerset), Plymouth (south Devon & parts of east Cornwall) and Truro (Mid and West Cornwall including the Isles of Scilly). Westcountry was the first and only ITV company to produce four opt-outs for its region.

== Identity ==
Between 1 January 1993 and 5 September 1999, Westcountry's presentation featured that of a large 'W' shape on a frosted screen over a background video of a nature scene. The idents were made so that the scene could only be seen clearly through the 'W' shape. Accompanying the video was a five-note jingle featuring string and flute instruments. This presentational package lasted throughout the whole period, with the only change on 8 September 1997 that of a form-up added made out of diagonal lines.

From 6 September 1999 however, the look changed drastically, as the Carlton 'Star' ident package was launched on the network. The look, featuring a start up film involving hearts would flash out to reveal the Carlton name over a spinning star background. The Westcountry name was only used on the news programme Westcountry Live. This package lasted until 28 October 2002, when regional continuity was lost.

In its place, a national ITV1 branding package, with local idents featuring the ITV1 logo on the left hand side of the screen with Carlton logo below. This remained until 1 December 2003, when the Carlton name was removed from regional idents, which instead featured four colour cubes randomly located in a scene from the region. The ITV1 logo was located in the bottom right corner with the caption ITV1 for the Westcountry located beneath. Following the 2004 ITV rebranding, the new local ident featured the national ident of three cubes containing the letters 'ITV' above a large cube '1', with the addition of the region name below. A few blunders occurred however. To begin with, Westcountry's local ident had the word West beneath which was later replaced as West Country. The ident was finally amended to show the right name at approximately the same time that regional idents were abandoned. Between 2006 and 2009, the Westcountry brand completely disappeared from continuity and the news service, respectively. The station would now be known on-air as just ITV1 at all times.

On 14 January 2013, the station's on-air identity was changed to ITV, along with all other ITV plc-owned franchises.

== Programmes ==
Westcountry's programme offerings were primarily aimed at a regional market as opposed to gaining network slots. Westcountry's flagship programme was the regional news magazine Westcountry Live, which ran between Westcountry's launch in 1993 until the merger in 2009. Other regional programmes included:

- Bendell at Bedtime – Topical debate (2004)
- Birthday People – Birthday slot for children (1993–2005)
- Blooming Marvelous – (1994–96)
- Brief Encounters – Feature series about unusual pastimes (1993–94)
- Energize! – A Saturday Children's magazine programme (1996–2000)
- Little River Journeys – A look at the Westcountry region's waterways, later aired by Channel 4 (1995)
- On the Road to the Islands – Jack Pizzey's tour of islands in the south west, later aired by Channel 4 (1993)
- Richard Digance: For One Night Only – Local entertainment series (1997–98)
- Special Report – current affairs programme
- The L.A.D.S. – A rare partly network commission, A magazine programme for men. (1996)
- Ruth Meets The Entertainers – (1995)
- The West At Work – (1993–96)
- Westcountry Focus – Westcountry's first regular current affairs series
- Westcountry Life – Short 30-second films reflecting aspects of life in the region (1993–96)
- Westcountry Soccer Night – Local football magazine show (2004–08)
- Westcountry Update – Weekly news review for the deaf and hard of hearing (1993–2004)
- West Wise – Short-lived inter-town quiz, one of Westcountry's first local programmes (1993)

In its annual reports, the Independent Television Commission (ITC) commented on Westcountry's programming and performance; in 1995 it said that Westcountry had a "good news service and regional programming", despite a difficult first year. Two years later in 1997 the ITC again noted its "strong, high quality regional programming" and that it had "scored a major network success with Christmas with the Royal Navy, a series of five live programmes". In 1999 the ITC again commented that Westcountry provided a "regional service of generally high quality" and that overall its range of regional programmes was "wide and included some strong factual material", also noting that one of its children's programmes had been supplied to the network.

== See also ==
- ITV Wales & West
- Television South West
- ITV (TV network)
- Westward Television

ITV regional service
Preceded by TSW	South West England; 1 January 1993 – 15 February 2009 (franchise & on-air brand); 16 February 2009 – 31 December 2013 (franchise only)	Succeeded by ITV West Country
