= Zobeide =

Zobeide may refer to:

- The Story of Zobeide, miracle in One Thousand and One Nights
- Zobeide, Martinique
- Zobeide, character in the opera Abu Hassan
- Zobeide (died 216 AH / 831 CE). wife of Harun al-Rashid

== See also ==
- Zubaida (name)
