= Zubaida =

Zubaida or variants may refer to:

- Zubaida (name), or variant spellings, including a list of people with the given name or surname
- 865 Zubaida, an asteroid
- Zubeidaa, a 2001 Indian film
- Zoebaida (also spelled Zubaida), a 1940 film from the Dutch East Indies

== See also ==
- Syair Siti Zubaidah Perang Cina, a 19th-century Malayan poem
