= Emma award =

Emma award can refer to:

- The Finnish musical award ceremony, Emma-gaala.
- EMMA (Ethnic Multicultural Media Awards).
