= Hassan of Basra =

Fairy tale from the Arabian Nights

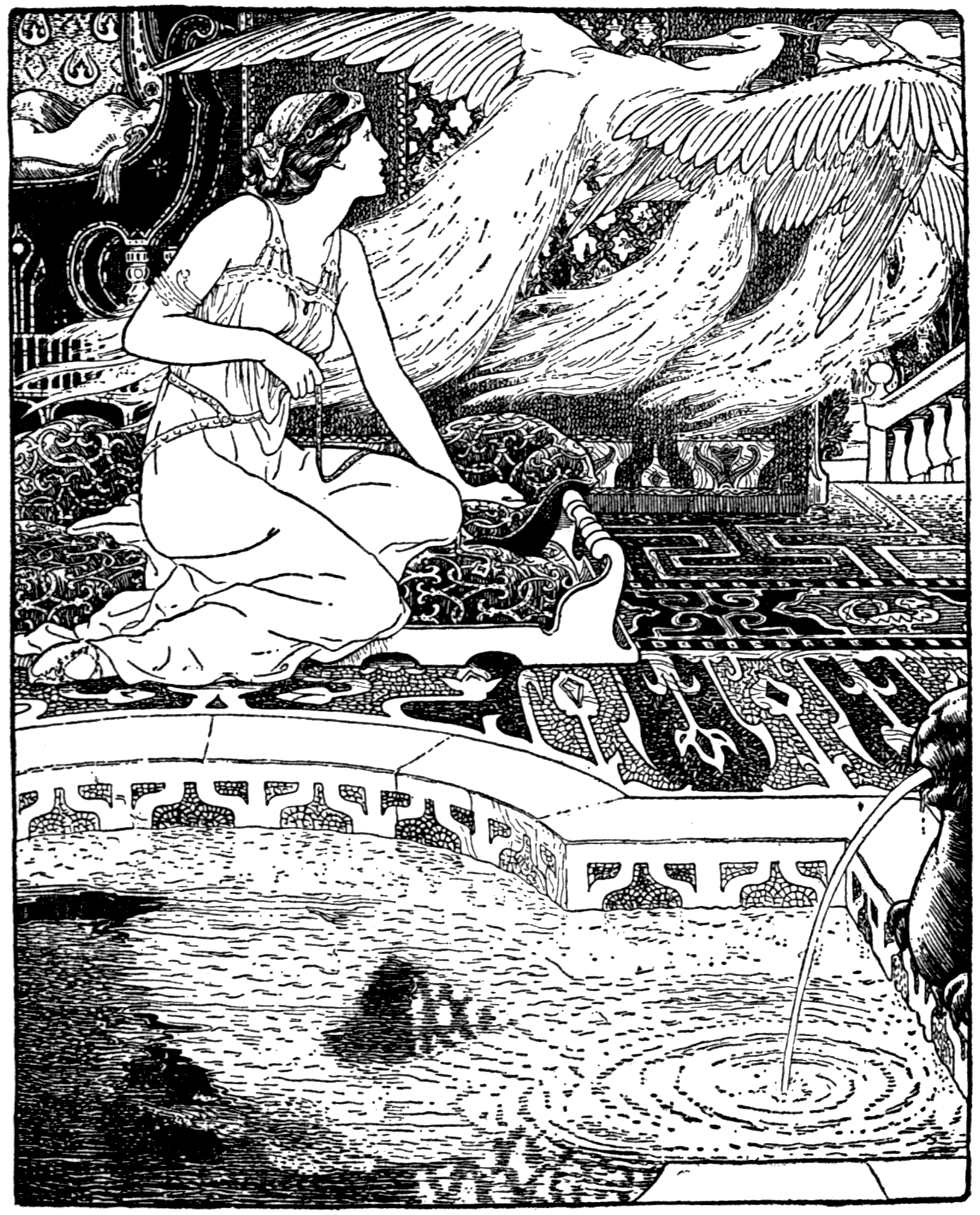
- The birds take flight from the ornate pavilion, leaving their sister behind. Illustration by John Batten.

Folk tale
- Name: Hassan of Basra
- Also known as: Hasan of Bassora
- Aarne–Thompson grouping: ATU 936*, "The Golden Mountain"; ATU 400, "The Man on a Quest for the Lost Wife"
- Published in: The Arabian Nights

Hassan of Basra is a folktale associated with the Arabian Nights, a compilation of Persian and Arabic folktales. Similar stories are attested in the same collection: Janshah and Mazin of Khorassan.

The tale is related to the international cycle of the swan maiden, a creature that alternates between human and avian forms, and to tale type ATU 400, "The Man on a Quest for the Lost Wife", of the international Aarne-Thompson-Uther Index. In addition, the initial part of the tale, classified as type ATU 936*, "The Golden Mountain", is indicated by scholars as a common opening of the former narrative, among other regions, in West Asia and Southern Europe, including Greece.

== Translations ==
The tale is sometimes translated as Hasan of Basra or Hassan of Bassora. Author Idries Shah translated the tale as The Bird Maiden in his work World Tales. Orientalist Edward William Lane published the tale as Story of Ḥasan of El-Baṣrah, in his 1877 book, and as How Hasan captured the Bird-Maiden and the Adventures that came after, in his translation of The One Thousand and One Nights. Poet John Payne published the tale as Hassan of Bassora and the King's Daughter of the Jinn, in his translation of The Arabian Nights.

== Summary ==
=== Meeting the Persian magician ===
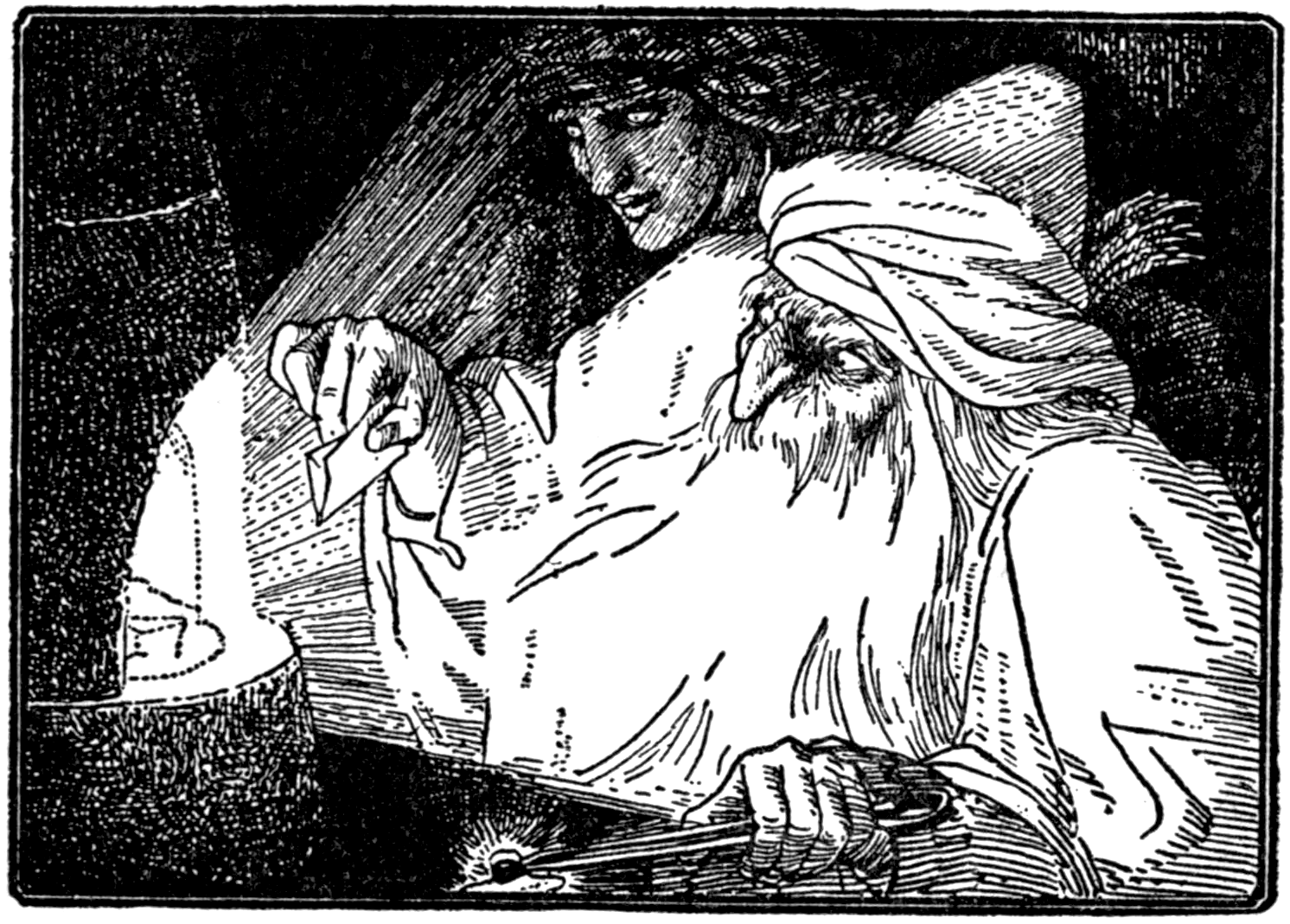
Hassan watches as the Persian magician transmutes metal into gold (by John D. Batten).

An Egyptian man settled in the city of Bassora. When he dies, his properties are divided equally between his two sons, the younger named Hassan, who becomes a goldsmith and opens up a store. One day, a Persian comes to his store with a proposition to have Hassan work for him and the youth will learn the ways of transmuting copper into gold. Despite his mother's suspicions, Hassan agrees to trust the man and, after the Persian transmutes copper in front of Hassan with a special powder, invites him home for dinner.

The Persian magician joins Hassan for dinner at the latter's house. During the meal, the magician dowses a piece of sweetmeat with an opiate of henbane and gives it to Hassan, who eats it and passes out. The Persian ties Hassan's limbs and carries him in a chest to the port, where he takes a ship to depart from Bassora. Meanwhile, Hassan's mother notices that neither her son, nor the magician are in the house, least of all in the village. Thinking her son is dead, she erects a tombstone and weeps over it.

Back to Hassan and the magician, who the narrative calls Behram, the youth wakes up on the boat and asks the magician's plans, since the latter made a vow of "bread and salt" for sacred hospitality. In response, the Persian says Hassan is just the latest in a long line of youths he sacrificed before (999 previous victims), and promises to spare him if the youth worships the fire. Hassan refuses to do so, and is held as a hostage in the ship for three months, until a heavy storm gathers in the ocean and the ship's captain begins to throw the magician Behram's slaves in the sea. Behram releases Hassan from his bonds and the storm subsides. Behram then reveals their destination: the Mountain of Cloud, where they can obtain the elixir that allows the transmutation of metal.

After another three months, Behram and Hassan reach their destination, and ride horses through a desert for 14 days until they reach the Mountain, where they are to find the herb that produces the elixir. Behram's plan is for Hassan to enter a horse's hide and wait for the birds (rukh) to take the hide up the mountain. It happens thus, and Hassan leaves the horse's hide to fetch faggots of the herb and throw them to the magician. After getting the faggots, Behram declares he has no use for the youth and leaves him stranded on the mountaintop. Hassan proclaims that no one is more powerful than God, and tries to look for a way out of the mountain. He reaches the other side of the mountain and, overlooking the sea, decides to leap from the cliff into the ocean.

=== The Princess of the Djinni ===
After plunging into the sea, Hassan swims the waves and reaches the shores of a kingdom he passed by with Behram. He finds a palace and enters it; inside, two maidens playing chess sight Hassan, whom they recognize as Behram's companion, and welcome him as their brother. The maidens explain they are princesses from the race of the Djinni (jinn or genies), and that they were locked in this palace by their father, who vowed never to marry any of them.

The seven sisters adopt Hassan as their brother, and, a year later, help the youth in getting his revenge on the magician Behram, when the latter brings his new apprentice/slave. After a while, a cloud of dust is approaching their palace, and the princesses explain it is a troop of their father's genii, come to summon them to a festivity. They receive the invitation, and give Hassan a set of keys for the human to use around the palace, with a caveat: he is forbidden to open a certain door.

After the princesses depart to their father's court, Hassan tries to amuse himself, and eventually opens the forbidden door: inside, a beautiful and lush garden with a pavilion nearby. Suddenly, ten birds come near the pavilion, become ten maidens of exceptional beauty and bathe and play in the water. Hassan, in hiding behind some trees, sees the most beautiful of them and falls in love with her. The maidens become birds again and fly back whence they came.

Hassan falls in love with the bird maiden and tries to find her the next day, to no avail. After the jinn princesses return, Hassan tells the situation to the youngest jinn princess, who chastises him for opening the forbidden door. Hassan leads the jinn princess to the garden, and she explains the pavilion and the pool belong to a princess of the jinn, daughter of the king of the kings of their race; they fly through the air by the use of their feather garments. Thus, the jinn princess advises, if Hassan wishes to have her, he should steal the feather garment and not return it.

The next day, the bird maidens fly back to bathe in the pavilion; Hassan steals the feather garment of the youngest of them. While the maidens fly back, the jinn princess realizes her garments were stolen and shrieks in terror; Hassan seizes the princess by the hair and drags her to a room on the palace, and locks her in. The great princess of the jinni is visited by Hassan's foster sisters and demands an explanation. The maidens assuage her fears and tell her Hassan's story. Hassan then pays a visit to his beloved and expresses his affection to her, promising to marry her and buy in Baghdad a house befitting her.

The other jinn princesses return from the hunt and learn of the presence of the daughter of their sovereign. They visit her and bow before her, then explain Hassan has no ill intent, save to make her his wife, since her feather garment has been burnt, and she cannot return to her father's palace.

=== Moving to Baghdad ===
Hassan and the djinni princess marry. One night, the youth has a dream about his mother, and decides to return to Bassora with his wife. After he meets his mother, he suggests they move out to Baghdad to live under the caliph's protection.

Hassan buys a large house for them in Baghdad, where he lives with the jinn princess and their two sons, Nasir and Mansur. Three years later, he decides to journey back to his adoptive sisters since he is missing them, and warns his mother to not let his wife leave the house, nor to return her the feather-garment - which was overheard by the jinn wife. After he leaves, the jinn princess decides to go to the local bath house, despite her mother-in-law's reluctance.

At the bath house, the jinn princess draws the attention of the visitors, and news of her beauty reach the ears of Zobeide (Zubaydah), the wife of caliph Harun Al-Rashid. Zobeide orders the woman to be summoned to her presence, and dispatches Mesrur, the chief of the eunuchs, to get her. Mesrur goes to Hassan's mother's house and asks both women to come with him to Zobeide's presence.

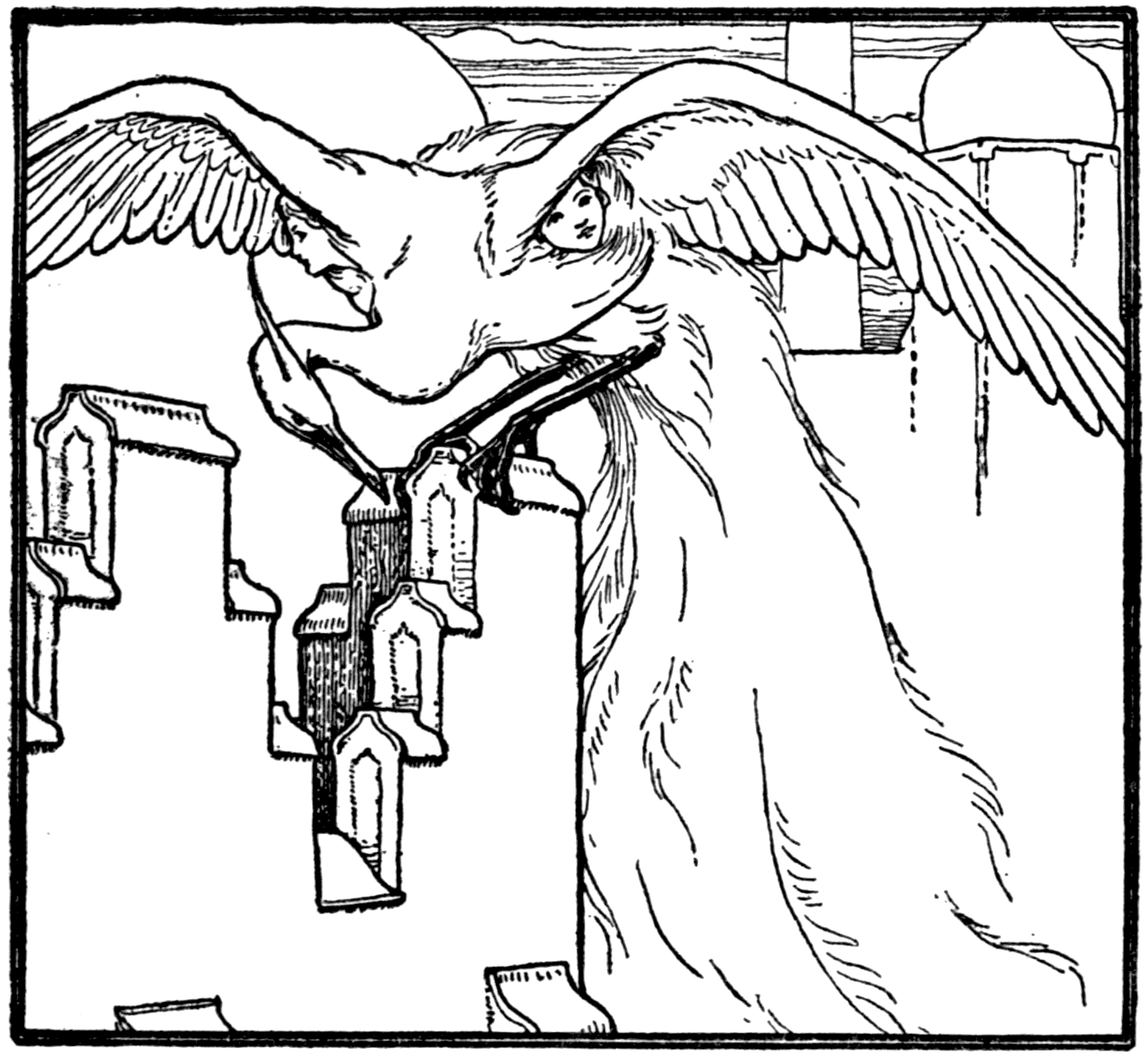
Hassan's wife changes back into a bird and takes her sons with her (by John D. Batten).

Hassan's mother and his wife go to the court wearing veils, and Zobeide orders the woman to take off the veil. The caliph's wife is dazzled by the djinni's beauty, and inquires her about her talents. Hassan's wife says she can dance as long as she wears her feather robe. On hearing this, Zobeide orders Hassan's mother to bring the feather garment, but she refuses to. Zobeide dispatches Masrur, the eunuch, to fetch the feather garment in their house and bring her. He takes the garment and returns it to Hassan's wife; she puts it on and begins to fly about the room. As her parting words, she tells her mother-in-law Hassan should find her and their children in the Wak-Wak Islands, then flies away.

Hassan returns to Baghdad and asks his mother about his family. With tears in her eyes, the woman tells Hassan his wife has regained the feather garment and flew away to Wak-Wak Islands with their children. Hassan falls into a state of despair for the disappearance of his family.

=== Hassan's long journey ===
After grieving for a month, Hassan goes back to his seven adoptive sisters in search of clues. The princesses consult with a paternal uncle, Sheik Abdul-Rodus, who agrees to help the human, despite dismissing his plight as futile. The Sheik and Hassan then ride elephants to a dark blue, where the Sheik acquires a book, and tells Hassan to ride a horse to another grotto.

On the way there, Abdul-Rodus explains that the Wak-Wak Islands are filled with Amazons, genii and demons, and Hassan's wife is the daughter of the king of the islands. Armed with this new information, Hassan reaches a black mountain, where a black man named Ali Abu'l Rish ("Father of Feathers") greets him and receives the book Hassan had with him.

Abu'l Rish takes Hassan with him and introduces him to a room with 4 sheiks. The group discuss the journey Hassan intends to take, and Abu'l Rish summons a jinn to take the human to the Land of Camphor, with a letter explaining the situation to its monarch.

=== Arrival at Waq Waq ===
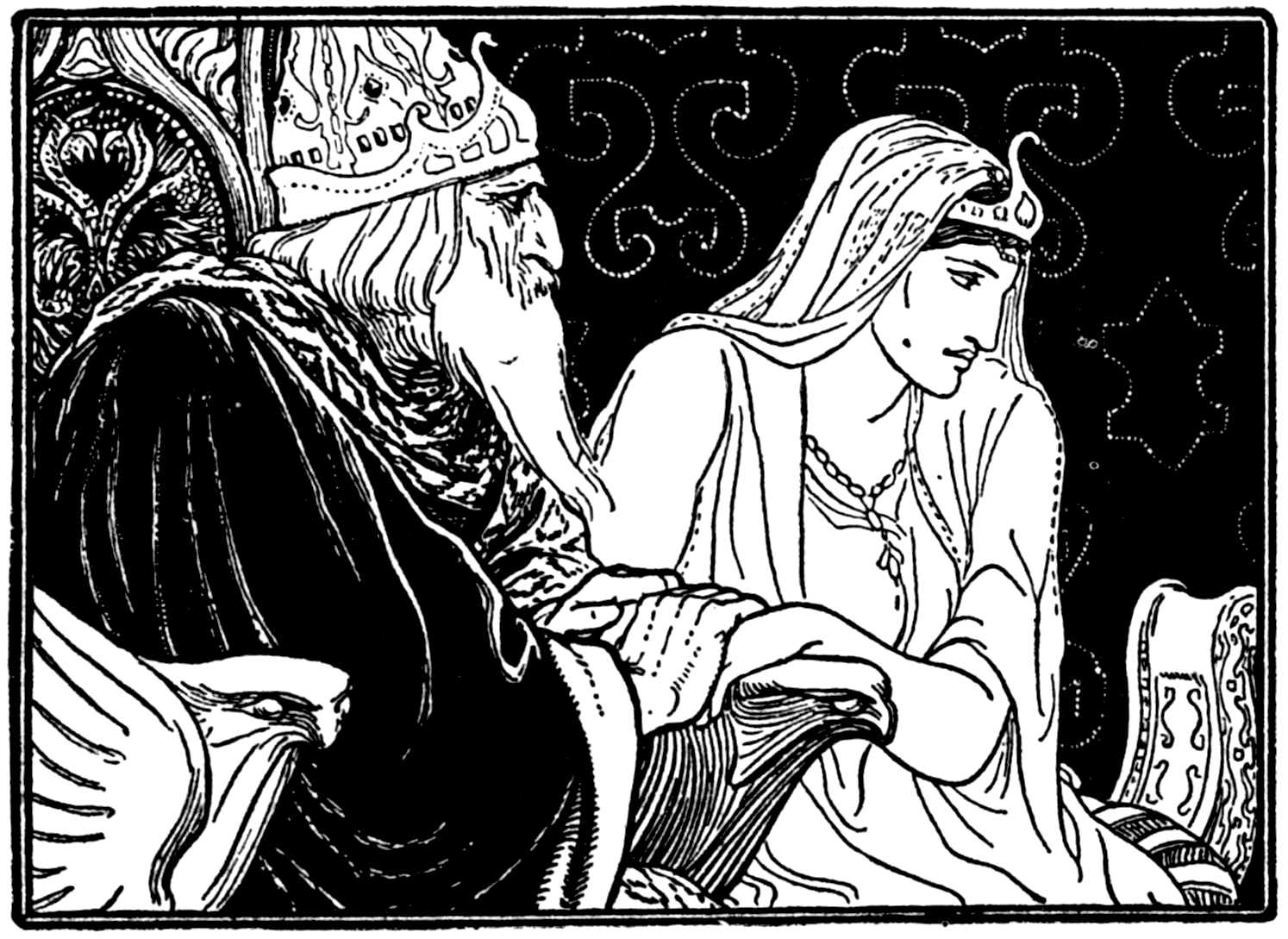
Hassan's wife, Manar Al-Sana, and her father, the king of the genii of Wak-Wak Islands (by John D. Batten).

In the Land of Camphor, Hassan boards a ship set for Waq Waq. When the ship reaches its shores, he sees some members of an amazonian guard trading with the merchants, and dons a crossdressing disguise so he can mingle better with the locals.

Hassan then meets the leader of the amazonian guard, Shawahi Umm Al-Dawahi, who is the queen's nursemaid. Hassan joins Shawahi's army and they traverse the large territories of Waq Waq (the Land of the Birds, the Land of the Wild Beasts and the Land of the Djinns), until they reach the mountains of Waq Waq. Shawahi brings Hassan before their queen, Nûr al-Hudâ, whom Hassan mistakes for his wife. Learning of her younger sister's marriage to a human, Nûr al-Hudâ orders Shawahi to go to Manar al-Sana (Hassan's wife) and bring her two children.

The Queen's orders are carried out, and, before her, Hassan recognizes his sons, Nasir and Mansur. Meanwhile, Manar al-Suna is ordered to present herself before her sister's court, and her father tells her about a dream he had: he was in a garden with a great hoard of treasures, and seven jewels (or bezels) were the most precious to him, but a bird came and snatched the seventh jewel, the smallest and most lustrous. Worried that his dream meant something, he sent for his dream interpreters, who foretold that his seventh daughter, Manar, would be taken from him. After hearing his words, Manar assures him that no man is capable of arriving at Waq Waq to take her away from him, so perilous is the journey there.

Manar arrives at the queen's court and finds her two sons, who tell her they saw their human father. Queen Nûr then mocks Manar for her illicit marriage to a human, and commands her guards seize her sister, throw her in the dungeon and whip her. Shawahi, their nursemaid, begs the queen to forgive her sister, but the woman is also beaten and cast out of the palace. Nûr writes their father a letter revealing the case of Manar's dalliance with a human, and the king agrees with her execution.

Meanwhile, Hassan, still in Waq Waq, finds two brothers quarreling about their inheritance: a magic cap of invisibility and a cane that summons members of the seven tribes of jinns. The human tricks the quarreling brothers, steals the objects, and goes to pay Shawahi another visit, with the cap of invisibility. During this meeting, Hassan learns his wife Manar has been arrested on her sister's orders.

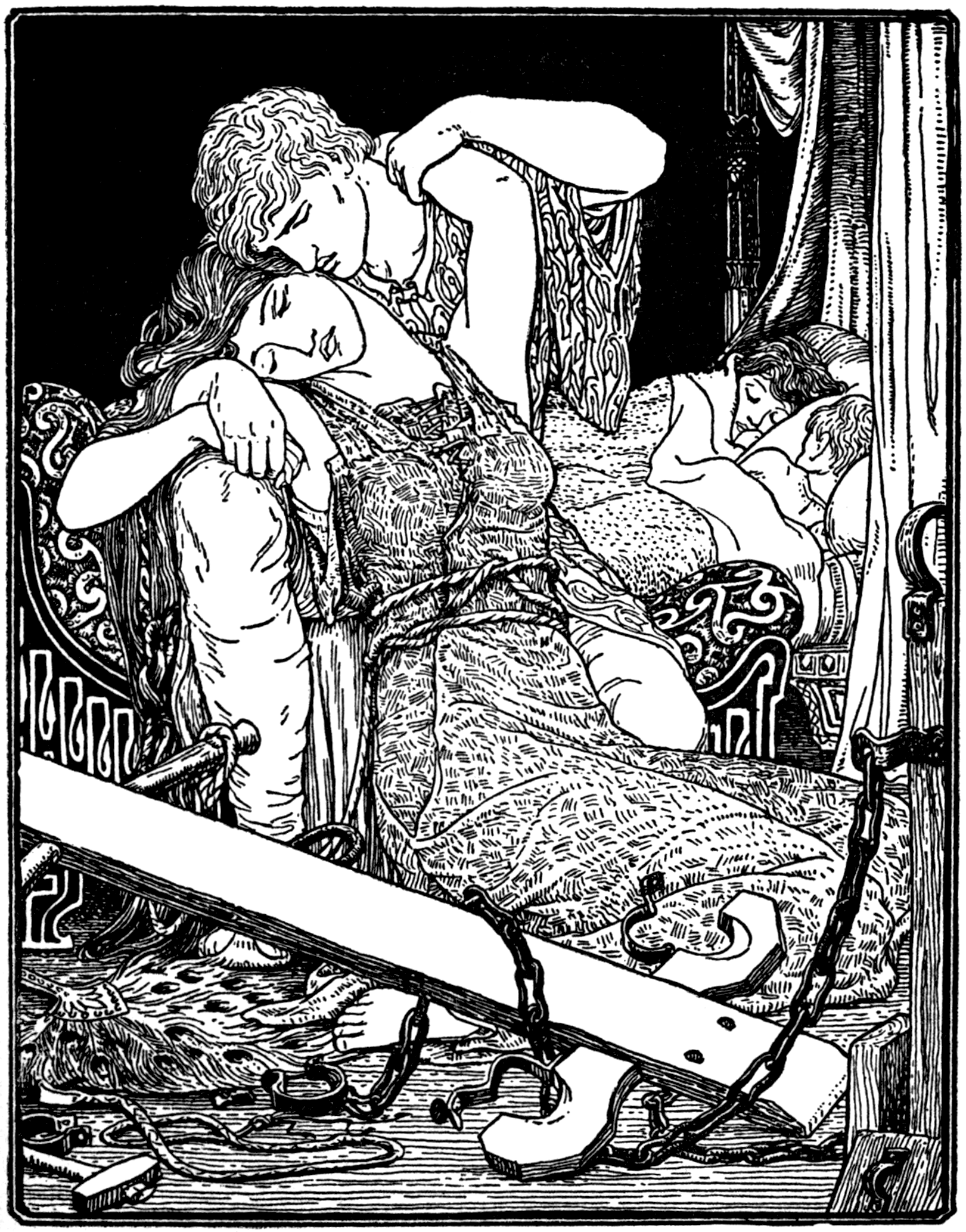
Hassan embraces his wife, near their sons' crib - the family reunited, at last (by John D. Batten).

Hassan dons the cap again and visits his wife's cell, where she is with her two sons. He takes off the cap and embraces his wife and children, but hides himself again when queen Nûr comes to belittle Manar. After she leaves, Hassan releases Manar, and the couple take their children to a door behind the queen's seraglio, but find it locked. On the other side of the door, a mysterious womanly voice (Shawahi's) promises to clear the way for them, if the couple take her with them. The couple agrees with her conditions and the five people escape the city.

Now, on the outskirts of the city, Hassan beats the cane on the earth to summons the seven djinns, and asks them to carry them over to Baghdad. The djinns, however, cannot take humans with them, but furnishes the family with horses powerful enough to take them back home before vanishing.

Hassan, his wife, his children and Shawahi ride the horses away from the city, when a giant Ifrit joins the retinue, and assures he will accompany them out of the islands, since he is "Moslem" just like Hassan. Then, after 31 days, a large cloud of dust walls the quintet, and Shawahi bids Hassan summon the djinn army, for the cloud dust is, in fact, Nûr al-Hadâ's armies.

A great battle ensues: Hassan's djinn army defeats the armies of Waq Waq, take queen Nûr prisoner and bring her before Hassan and his wife. Shawahi declares she must be punished, but Manar begs him to forgive her sister. Manar embraces her sister Nûr, and they reconcile. The prisoners of war are released; Nûr and Shawahi go back to Waq Waq, while Manar and Hassan make their way towards Baghdad.

The couple pass by King Hassun, the lord of the Land of Camphor and the castle of crystal. After hearing the man's tale, King Hassun congratulates him for journeying to Waq Waq Island and surviving. The couple then go to Abu al-Ruwaysh and Abu al-Kaddus. Both sorcerers congratulate Hassan on his safe journey, and ask him to safekeep the summoning cane and the cap of invisibility. After pondering a bit, Hassan agrees to give them the items for safekeeping, but still expresses his fears his father-in-law may go after them.

Lastly, the family pays a visit to Hassan's adoptive djinn sisters and spends some time there, and finally returns to Baghdad, where Hassan's mother welcomes her son, her daughter-in-law and her grandsons back home.

== Analysis ==
=== Tale type ===
The first part of the tale is classified in the international Aarne-Thompson-Uther Index as tale type ATU 936*, "The Golden Mountain": the hero is hired by a rich man and taken to a golden mountain, where he is to be carried up the mountain by the birds and fetch gold for the rich man. The hero's employer abandons him up the mountain and leaves with the gold; the hero then miraculously escapes through some means, and turns the tables on his former boss, leaving him to die on the same mountain. According to German scholar Hans-Jörg Uther, the first part of the tale type (hero's abandonment up the mountain) is "often" an introduction to type ATU 400.

The second part of the tale, with the hero finding the bird maiden and losing her, is classified as type ATU 400, "The Man on a Quest for the Lost Wife". In this tale type, the hero finds a maiden of supernatural origin (e.g., the swan maiden) or rescues a princess from an enchantment; either way, he marries her, but she sets him a prohibition. The hero breaks the prohibition and his wife disappears to another place. He goes after her on a long quest, often helped by the elements (Sun, Moon and Wind) or by the rulers of animals of the land, sea and air (often in the shape of old men and old women).

The episode of Hassan stealing the magic objects from the quarreling brothers is classified as tale type ATU 518, "Men Fight Over Magic Objects": hero tricks or buys magic items from quarreling men (or giants, trolls, etc.). Despite its own catalogation, folklorists Stith Thompson and Hans-Jörg Uther argue that this narrative does not exist as an independent tale type, and usually appears in combination with other tale types, especially ATU 400.

=== Motifs ===
Romanian folklorist Marcu Beza recognized an alternate opening to swan maiden tales: the hero receives a key and, against his master's wishes, opens a forbidden chamber, where the bird maidens are bathing. This motif may be known as "The Forbidden Chamber", in folkloristic works. Edwin Sidney Hartland indicated the occurrence of this opening episode in tales from Arabic folklore.

== Variants ==
=== Arabic literature ===
According to Jiří Cejpek, Ulrich Marzolph and Richard van Leewen, other tales from Arabian Nights that show a similar narrative of the hero searching for his wife are Janshah and Mazin of Khorassan.

A similar tale is attested in the romance Sayf ben Dhi Yazan; the titular Sayf spies on dove-maidens coming to bathe in a pool; Sayf falls in love with their queen, Munyat al-Nufus, steals her doveskin and makes her his wife.

==== Mazin of Khorassan ====
Mazin lives with his widowed mother and works as a dyer in Khorassan. One day, a foreigner named Bahram comes to his shop and declares his intentions to adopt the youth as his son, and promises to show him the secret of transmuting metal into gold. The next day, Bahram fulfills his promise and, convinced of the man's intentions, Mazin agrees to go with him and invites him home while his mother is away. Back home, Bahram drugs Mazin and takes him to his ship, while Mazin's mother cries over her lost son, thinking him dead.

Now out in the open sea, Bahram rouses Mazin awake and reveals his true, evil intent. Mazin prays to Heaven for help; a storm appears on the horizon to threaten the ship, until Bahram makes a vow to let the youth live. After three months, the ship arrives on an island shore. Bahram and Mazin ride their camels through the landscape for days, until they reach a lofty mountain named Mountain of the Clouds. Bahram explains that Mazin is to be taken by the large bird to its top and fetch him the black dust spread around. Bahram kills one of the camels, flays its skin and bids Mazin enter it, so he can be transported by the Roc to the top of the mountain.

The Roc brings the dead camel's skin to the top of the mountain. Mazin exits it and begins to gather the black powder into a bag, then throws it down the mountain to Bahram. The magician celebrates his quest is over and turns around to return to his ship, abandoning Mazin to his fate. The youth walks to the edge of the mountain and plunges into the sea. Washing ashore, he prays to Allah he is alive and walks round the mountain back to the road they previously took. He reaches a large palace he passed by before, which belongs to seven genii daughters, who decide to adopt him as their brother. After living one year with them, Mazin notices that Bahram has brought another student/victim with him, and decapitates the magician with a sabre to end his menace once and for all.

Some time later, the genii princesses are visited by their father's messengers, who summon them to the court. Before they leave for a month, they give Mazin a set of keys, and orders not to open a certain door. After they leave, curiosity takes the better of him and he opens the forbidden door. Beyond the door, a magnificent garden with a basin in its center. One afternoon, Mazin rests in the garden and sees the arrival, through the air, of seven maidens wearing "light green silk" robes. They take off their robes to play in the basin, wear them back and fly away.

The seven genii sister return the next day and Mazin tells them about the seven maidens, having falling in love with one of them. One of the genii princesses informs Mazin that the seven green-robed maidens belong to an all-female race of genii (since they give up their male children to neighbouring tribes) who live in a distant and inaccessible kingdom. For him to have the maiden, he needs to steal her robe. The next day, Mazin and one of the genii sisters wait for the maidens to fly to their garden, steal the maiden's robe, forcing her to stay at the palace while the other fly away.

Mazin and the genii princess welcome the (former) flying maiden to the palace, where Mazin courts her. Now, missing him, the genii princesses allow Mazin to return home to his mother, furnishing him with provisions. Mazin goes back home and introduces his wife to his mother, and the family move out to Baghdad. Three years later, after Mazin's wife gave birth to two sons, Mazin decides to pay a visit to his genii sisters, and leaves his wife under his mother's care, giving her a key to a room where he hid the maiden's flying robe.

After he departs, Mazin's wife decides to go to the public bath. Once there, the slaves of Sultana Zobaida marvel at her beauty and go to report to her mistress. The Sultana, intrigued by this new personage, orders the maiden to be brought to her. It thus happens, and the Sultana also marvels at her beauty and composure. Mazin's wife, cunningly, tells that she will look even more beautiful if she has her robe.

The Sultana orders Mazin's mother to bring her daughter-in-law's robe. Mazin's mother rushes home to fulfill the order, and brings it to the maiden. She puts on the robe and begins to soar in the air. She tells her mother-in-law to inform Mazin to seek her in the islands of Wauk-al-Wauk, and departs with her two sons.

Mazin returns from his journey and learns from his mother that his wife has departed with their children, fainting at the sad news. After composing himself, he decides to seek his wife at the island, despite them being a 150 years' distance from Baghdad. Mazin begins his journey by visiting his adoptive sisters. Despite their warnings, the genii princesses agree to help the youth, and direct him to two uncles, one named Abd al Kuddoos, and the other Abd al Sulleeb.

Mazin rides three months until he reaches a "venerable-looking man", Abd al Kuddoos. He greets the youth and, after learning of the reasons of his journey, tries to dissuade him from going further. After much insistence on Mazin'a part, Abd al Kuddoos summons a "genius" and commands him to carry Mazin to Abd al Sulleeb. With Abd al Sulleeb, Mazin convinces him to help. Abd al Sulleeb summons a cadre of ten genii who are ordered to carry Mazin to Wauk-al-Wauk. The ten genii obey the command, but carry him to the Land of Kafoor, since going further means entering other tribes' territory.

In the Land of Kafoor, Mazin walks for ten days, until he finds three brothers quarreling about their father's inheritance: a cap, a drum, and a wooden ball. Mazin doubts about their effectiveness at first, but the three brothers explains that, despite their simple appearance, the cap is one of invisibility, the small copper drum can summon the princes of the genii and their armies, and the wooden ball allows one to cross larger distances in no time, by simply following it. Mazin deceives the brothers and steals the objects for himself.

He summons the spirits of the drums (which are part of the genii race) and asks them the distance to Wauk-al-Wauk; three years' journey, they answer. Mazin casts the ball and follows it through a land of dragons, until he sights the fiery red mountains of the islands and, before him, a vast sea. Once again, he summons the spirits and they answer that only a sage who lives in a cellar nearby can help him cross the sea. By using the ball again, Mazin finds the sage. The sage and Mazin climb up a mountain until they arrive at a fortress; deep within, a brazen statue near a basin. The sage kindles a fire and utters an incantation in front of the statue. Thunder and clouds rage and the basin boils; the ocean is drained, creating a passageway.

Mazin crosses through the dried up ocean until he reaches Wauk-al-Wauk at last, and meets a "masculine-looking" old woman who he confides in. The old woman takes him in and tells that his wife has been subject to terrible mistreatment since her return, but will report back to him once he finds her. The old lady goes to the palace, since she is the princesses' nurse, and confers with Mazin's eldest sister-in-law about the fate of his wife. The queen, their leader, comments that her sister is trapped in the dungeons with her sons, since he married a man of another race. The old lady goes to the dungeon and enters Mazin's wife's cell. She comforts the maiden by saying her husband is there, and will bring release for her and her children.

Mazin enters the palace with the cap of invisibility and wanders the corridors to the dungeon, where he finds his wife's cell. Mazin releases his wife from her confinement, and they decide to escape that same night. Learning of their escape, the queen goes after the couple with her army. Mazin beats the drum to summon his army to protect his family from the queen, but Mazin's wife begs him to spare her sister's life. Any attempt at attacking each other cease, and they celebrate peace.

Mazin and his family wander back to the Abd al Sulleeb, but are attacked by a cadre of robbers. The youth beats the drums and commands his genii army to scare the robbers off. Mazin and his family visit his helpers Abd al Sulleeb and Abd al Kuddoos, then the genii sisters, and finally arrive at Baghdad, to see Mazin's mother. After crying so much she became blind, Mazin's mother sees her son and her vision is restored. Later, Mazin goes to the court of Caliph Haroun as Raschid and Sultana Zobaida, and retells his entire adventure.

=== Other regions ===
According to German scholar Ulrich Marzolph, tale type 936* appears in combination with tale type 400 among Finno-Ugric peoples, in Southern Europe (Greece and Italy), in Turkey, across North Africa, and in Central Asia (among Turkmen, Tatar and Uyghur peoples), although the tale exists independently in the Middle East and in Central Asia. In the same vein, German ethnologue Cristoph Schmitt remarked that type 936* occurs as the opening to type 400 in Southeastern Europe and in West Asia.

According to Luisa Rubini, the combination of both tale types is "widely spread" in the Mediterranean area. On a related note, according to Edward Allworthy Armstrong, Mediterranean tales of the swan maiden "have affinities" with Hassan of Bassorah, probably following a diffusion by Islam to the West.

==== Europe ====
===== Romania =====
In a tale from the Transylvanian Saxons collected by Josef Haltrich with the title Die Schwanenfrau ("The Swan Girl"), an old woman has a son that wishes to find work in the world. He first works as a shepherd. One day, he sights a white bird in the cornfields and follows it to the forest. He loses his way there, but finds a castle with an old man inside. The old man agrees to offer him shelter and work for a year. One day, the old man has to leave, but gives the youth a set of keys and warns him not to open the last door. The youth obeys the order for some time, but he eventually opens the last door: inside, three maidens bathing in the water. When the girls notice the youth, they turn into swans and fly away. After his master returns, he confesses he opened the door, and now has to work for him for another year. The next year, the man leads the youth to the forbidden room; inside, the same three girls that fly as swans. The man asks the youth which of them he liked best, and he answers: "the youngest". The man instructs him to return to that room that night, get a box from under the bed and bring it to him. The man then explains that the youth is to take the box to his house, without looking back, and the girl will be his. The youth obeys his advice; when he returns home, he turns around and sees a lovely maiden dressed in white. He marries the girl and they live happily together. However, one day, the girl begins to feel sad, and tells her husband she wants her swan garments back. Fearing his wife might fly away, he locks the windows and doors. The girl wears back her garments, turns back into a swan and flies through the chimney. Desperate, the youth goes back to the man in the castle, and is told she is now on a distant island, kept by a fierce dragon. Heeding the words, the youth makes a long seven-year journey, until he meets three giants competing over magical objects. The youth steals a wishing cap, a cloak of invisibility and a sword of invincibility. He teleports to the dragon's island and kills it. He goes to the castle, tosses the box in the sea and finds his wife.

===== Portugal =====
Folklorist Consiglieri Pedroso published a Portuguese tale titled The Spell-bound Giant (Portuguese: O Gigante Encantado): a widow has three sons, but lives in absolute poverty. To help his mother, the eldest son decides to seek his fortune in the world. He arrives at a city and finds work with a magician. Both ride their horses to the foot of a mountain. The magician orders the youth to kill his own horse, open its belly and extract its entrails, and hide inside with some bags. The youth obeys, despite some protests, and the magician, by opening a book, chants a spell to levitate the horse hide up the mountain. Atop the mountain, the youth leaves the horse hide and finds gold, silver, brilliants and precious stones, which he bags and places in the horse hide for the magician to bring over to him. After his work is done, the magician abandons him up the mountain. The youth wanders the mountaintop and finds a root. Pulling up the root, he finds a trapdoor, and a staircase leading downwards. The youth finds a magnificent palace and a giant lying down on a bed. After the youth begs him to stay, the giant explains his state is due to the same magician that left him up the mountain, but the youth can help both of them: the next morning, three doves shall come to bathe in a water tank, a white one, a gray one and a cinnamon-coloured one, and he must get the white dove. The youth obeys the giant's orders: he stays in hiding and tries to capture the white dove after she and her companions come, but manages to pluck two of her feathers. The day after, he captures her. The dove becomes a human maiden. Meanwhile, back to the youth's mother, his youngest brother goes looking for him: he goes to the same city and learns of the magician his brother was employed for. The brother goes with the magician to the same mountain and is levitated in a horse skin to the mountaintop. Instead of treasures, the brother fills the sacks with bones to deceive the magician, and throws a large stone at him, breaking his legs. Inside the mountain palace, the giant feels the curse if lifted, and the palace begins to rise. Back to the widow, she wakes up one morning and sees a palace just opposite her house, her sons also there. The giant becomes a prince, who marries the white dove maiden (back to human shape), while the brothers in the palace marry the other two dove maidens (also back to human shape).

===== Greece =====
Greek folktale scholars Anna Angelopoulou and Aigle Brouskou, editors of the Greek Folktale Catalogue, remarked that, in Greece, tale type ATU 400 appears in three main combinations, one of which is with tale type ATU 936*, Το Χρυσό βουνό ("The Golden Mountain"). In this regard, according to Greek researcher Marilena Papachristophorou, the combination of both types (ATU 936* and ATU 400, "The Man on a Quest for the Lost Wife") totalled 32 out of 80 tales registered in the Greek Folktale Corpus. In the same vein, Richard McGillivray Dawkins noted that, despite being "separate and separable themes", both stories combined into a "fairly well-fixed form" in Greek variants.

Author Barbara Ker Wilson translated a Greek tale with the title The Dove Maiden. In this tale, a poor widow has a son named Paul. One day, Paul is carrying a bundle of sticks in his hands, when he sees a Jew on the road. The Jew tells him he wishes to hire him as a servant. He gives Paul some gold to give his mother, and departs with the lad on a ship to another country. They disembark, the Jew and Paul reach the foot of the Mountain of Jewels. The Jew tells the youth he needs to fly up to the mountaintop with the help of eagles. For this purpose, the Jew hides Paul inside a sheepskin so that the eagles carry him up the mountain. It so happens: Paul cuts open the sheepskin, gathers the gems and jewels and throws them to the Jew down below. The Jew leaves Paul stranded on the mountain and goes back to the ship. Trapped on the mountain, Paul lifts a rock and discover a set of stairs that leads down below. He climbs down the stairs and finds an Ogre's quarters. Paul pretends to be the Ogre's son and lives with him. One day, the Ogre gives him a set of keys and forbids him from opening the 40th door in his underground abode. Driven by curiosity, Paul disobeys the Ogre's orders and opens it: inside, a beautiful garden. A white dove lands near the lake, takes off its doveskin to become a maiden, bathes in the lake, turns into a dove again and flies off. Paul tells the story to the Ogre, who advises him to steal the dove plumage the next time she lands there. Paul follows the advice, steals the plumage and takes her as his wife. The Dove Maiden agrees to marry him, but warns that she fears her father. At any rate, Paul keeps the dove plumage in a safe place for years, and the Dove Maiden gives birth to two children. Time passes, and Paul begins to miss his mother. The Ogre gives him and his wife heaps of treasure and bids him a safe journey back home. Paul and his wife go back to his mother; he hides the dove plumage and warns his mother not to give to the Dove Maiden. However, Paul's mother accidentally reveals the location to the Dove Maiden, she wears it again, gives two feathers to her children, and bids her husband seek her with iron shoes and an iron cane in a land where five white towers stand in a green field. The Dove Maiden departs; and her husband goes after her. Paul asks the Jew to be brought back to the Mountain of Jewels by the same method as before; the Jew fulfills his request. Paul visits the Ogre and asks for iron shoes to be made. Now fully equipped, Paul begins his long journey. On the road, he meets two men quarreling over enchanted objects: a self-moving sword, a flying carpet and a hat of invisibility. Paul steals the items and flies on the carpet to the Dove Maiden's father's kingdom. He enters the five white towers and finds his wife. The Dove Maiden is glad to see him again, but fears for him. After hiding him, her father, a Giant, comes into the room and orders her daughter to reveal the human she is hiding. Paul takes off the invisibility hat and commands the sword to kill his father-in-law. Now free of her father, the Dove Maiden and Paul go back to the Ogre to restore his sight, and finally back home.

Austrian consul Johann Georg von Hahn collected a tale from Epiros with the title Von dem Prinzen und der Schwanenjungfrau and translated by Reverend Edmund Martin Geldart as The Prince and the Fairy. In this tale, a king builds a glass chamber to keep his son away from the world. One day, the prince inquires about a bone, and uses it to crack open a glass pane. The prince and his tutors take a walk through the world. He joins the nobles in hunting hares, and one day decides to walk alone. He meets a Jew, who convinces him to play a game: first, to buy a buffalo's skin, hide inside it and let the ravens take him up to the hill. The prince is taken to the hill and the Jew shouts at him to throw two stones (which are in fact diamonds). The Jew abandons the prince on the mountain and departs. Trapped there, he finds a trapdoor and pulls it open. He climbs down a staircase and arrives at another realm, with a palace in the distance. Inside the palace, an old man is trapped. He releases the old man who gives him the keys to the apartments. Behind a closed door, three fairies come to bathe in "a hollow place filled with water". The old man advises the prince to steal one of their garments, for their strength lie in the clothes. The prince steals the youngest's garments and wants to make her his wife. The old man tells him to go to the stables and summon a winged steed to carry him back to his kingdom. On the road, the prince meets the fairy's brothers, one at a time, who are disguised as dervishes. The prince kills his brothers-in-law and returns to his father's castle. The king throws a large series of festivities with music and dance. The prince gives his bride's garments to his mother, but the fairy, cunningly, asks her mother-in-law to return the garments to her, so she can dance better. The fairy flies away back to her kingdom. The prince goes after with the winged steed and reaches his bride's kingdom, where he learns her father is at war with another kingdom. The prince uses magical items and defeats the enemy army. Now victorious, the prince wears a disguise and goes to his father-in-law's court to be rewarded. The king offers him his youngest daughter for wife, and she recognizes her husband.

===== Italy =====
The combination of types also appears in Sicily, classified in the Italian index with the title La moglie perduta ("The Lost Wife"): a man hires himself to a magician to help fetch some gems, is betrayed, and later finds a maiden of supernatural origin whose garments he steals; he marries her, but a mistake on his mother's part causes her departure and he goes after her.

Author Laura Gonzenbach collected a Sicilian tale with a similar narrative. In this tale, originally titled Vom Joseph, der auszog sein Glück zu suchen and translated as About Joseph, who set out to seek his Fortune, a poor couple has a son named Joseph. One day, he decides to leave home and seek his fortune in the world. On the road, he is hired by a mysterious gentleman. Joseph and the gentleman ride their horses to large mountain. As part of his service, they kill an extra horse, desiccate its skin in the sun to make a hide, sew Joseph inside it and let the ravens carry it to a mountaintop. Once there, Joseph cuts open the horse hide and finds himself surrounded by diamonds. Down below, the gentleman shouts to him to fill a sack and throw the sack off the mountain. Joseph obeys, but he is left there by his employer. Luckily for him, Joseph discovers a trap door on the mountain and opens it. He climbs down and meets a blinded giant, who he deceives by pretending to be his nephew. He also learns from the giant that four fairies come to bathe in the giant's garden fountain. Joseph steals the garments of the leader of the fairies and marries her. Eventually, the giant sends Joseph and his fairy wife home to his parents, and warns Joseph not to return his wife's magical garments. Before his departure, the giant gifts him a golden box with her wife's garments inside and a magic wand. On the way back, Joseph wishes on the magic wand for a palace for him and his wife, with servants and riches, and brings his parents with him. Despite their luxurious life, Joseph's fairy wife longs to be with the other fairies again, and secretly plans to get her garments back. One day, during a ball Joseph is holding at his new palace, a man dances with the fairy, who tells him she can dance better if her dance partner steals the golden box for her. The man takes the box to the fairy, who wears back her garments and flies away. Set on finding her, Joseph meets his former employer, the gentleman, and they go to the same mountain of diamonds. They repeat the same action of baiting the ravens with the horse hide, so that Joseph can talk to the blind giant. The giant reveals Joseph's wife is under the power of another giant, and gives him some bread for the road. On his journey, Joseph shares his food with an ant, and plucks an arrow from an eagle and a thorn from a lion's paw. In return for his good deeds, Joseph is given an ant's leg, an eagle's feather and a lion's hair, so he can transform into those animals. With his new powers, Joseph flies to the giant's palace and, changed into a small ant, he creeps through a nook in the wall and sees his wife and other fairies captured in chains. He learns from his wife about the giant's secret: Joseph needs to kill a seven-headed dragon in the mountains behind the palace; inside the dragon, a raven with an egg with the giant's lifeforce.

In a South Italian tale titled Dammi lu velu!, translated as Der geraubte Schleier ("The Stolen Veil") and Give Me The Veil!, a poor youth lives a miserable life and one day wanders off to the beach, where a "man from the Orient" ("Levantine Greek", in Jack Zipes's translation) approaches him with a business proposition. The youth and the man arrive at the foot of a mountain. The man strikes the ground with his cane and a winged horse appears to them. The man explains that atop of the mountain there are treasures in jewels and gold, and bids the youth flies up there with the horse, loads the horse with sacks of gold, then return. The youth makes three trips to the mountain top, but the third time the man strikes the ground and summons the horse to his side, leaving the youth stranded on the mountaintop. He wanders around the top of the mountain and meets an old woman, who tells him the man from the Orient always does that every year, and bids him come with her. Suspicious at first, the youth comes with her. The old woman directs him to a fountain, and tells him about twelve veiled maidens that come to bathe there. The youth hides, and waits for the moment: twelve doves come to the fountain, drink a bit of water and become maidens. The youth steals the veil and locks it in a box the old woman gave her. Despite her pleas, the youth does not returns the veil, and goes back home in directions given by the old woman. The youth gives the veil for his mother to hide, and marries the maiden. After some incessant pleading, the youth's mother gives back the veil to the maiden, who becomes a dove and flies away. The youth learns his wife flew away and goes looking for the man from the Orient to go through the same process as before, in order to find the old woman atop the mountain. The youth repeats his steps and finds the old woman, who scolds him and tells him to steal the veil again. His wife flies in again to the fountain, the youth steals her veil and lets the old woman burn it. The youth takes his wife home with him and inquires about her origins: she is the daughter of the King of Spain. The youth pays a visit to the King of Spain and shows him his long-lost daughter. Overjoyed, the king of Spain marries his daughter to the youth.

===== Azerbaijan =====
Azerbaijani scholarship recognizes, in the Azerbaijani Folktale Corpus, a similar combination of types 936 and 400. In the Azerbaijani type 936, "Qızıl dağ" ("Golden Mountain"), the hero joins with a merchant and both travel to the golden mountain on a forty days journey; the hero enters the animal's carcass which the eagles bring up the mountain, drops the gems to the merchant, and is left there to die. In Azerbaijani type 400, "Ər itmiş arvadını axtrır" ("Man searches for his lost wife"), as an alternate opening to the type, the hero steals the peri's clothes during her bathtime and makes her his wife; later, she regains her clothes and flies back to her homeland; the hero dons iron shoes and an iron staff and begins to look for her; he meets three divs (giants) on the road and steals their magic objects, which help him get closer to his wife's location.

In an Azeri tale published by Azeri folklorist Hanafi Zeynalli and translated into Russian as "Джаган-шах" ("Djagan-Shah"), in China, a padishah named Tehmuz Shah has a son named Djagan Shah. One day, Djagan-Shah sails with seven friends through the oceans, when a storm falls on the sea and makes their ship change direction to an apparently deserted island. On the island, Djagan-Shah and his crew learn that a race of demi-humans lives in the trees, and do battle with the monkeys. Djagan-Shah and his friends become the king of the monkeys and command them against the demi-humans. After seven years, Djagan-Shah and hs friends try to run out of the country of the demi-humans, and lose everyone as they cross it. Only Djagan survives, even traversing the lands of wild animals until he reaches a city. He meets a man in search of an assistant, and works for him. One day, the man informs him he will earn his pay, and goes with him to the foot of a mountain. The man kills a horse and places Djagan inside for the eagles to carry over the mountain to their nest. Atop the mountain, Djagan gathers precious gems and throws them to the man, who leaves him there. Djagan realizes he was abandoned and wanders through a forest until he finds a white-walled tower. The tower keeper greets Djagan as the son of Tehmuz Shah, and tells him he works for Sultan Suleiman as his birdkeeper, and lets Djagan live with him, so long as he does not open a certain door. While the tower keeper is away feeding the birds, Djagan opens the door and sees a garden. Three doves come to bathe in the garden, but sens a man is nearby and the leader of the doves, princess Gulzar Khanum, daughter of the padishah of the peris, flies away with her companions. Djagan falls in love with Gulzar, and learns from the towerkeeper they are peris who, every seven years, come to bathe for three months in the garden pool, and, if Djagan wants to make Gulzar his wife, he has to hide her niqab with him and keep it with him. Djagan waits seven years for the Peris' return, and steals Gulzar's niqab. Despite her pleas, he keeps her clothes with him. Djagan says goodbye to his friend, the towerkeeper and returns to his father's land with Gulzar. Tehmuz Shah welcomes his son back and celebrates his son's wedding to the peri. After some days, Djagan orders some masons to take the Peri's garments, bury it in a mountain and build a pavilion over it. Despite this attempt, Gulzar manages to find her garments, wears it and flies back to her father's country. Djagan learns of this, and, after time grieving, decides to search for his wife and the Fortress of Gavhariham. He goes back to the city where he met the man and asks him to retrace his steps to the mountain of gems. Djagan goes back to the towerkeeper and asks him about the location of Gavhariham. The towerkeeper does not, so he directs Djagan to his elder brother, in another tower. The elder brother does not know either, but guides Djagan to his eldest brother, in yet another tower. The third brother, who has lived 900 years, bids Djagan wait three months so that his 900 birds can return with more information. After three months, an old, 1200-year bird, comes to the tower and tells that, when it was younger, it flew with his parents near a shining castle of gold and silver. The old eagle carries him to the fortress, where he learns his wife, Gulzar Khanum, as her punishment, was sentenced to hang by her braids on a pole on the road to see if any passerby was her husband. Djagan passes by the road and drinks a bit of water. When he sees his wife's reflection, he faints and falls in the water. Gulzar cries out that the man is her husband, and her guards wake him up and bring both to the padishah of the peris. Djagan Shah tells him the whole story, and a grand wedding is celebrated for 40 days and nights. Later, Djagan and his peri wife return to his father's kingdom, right when his father, Tehmuz shah, is going to war against the emperor of China. Djagan joins the battle and turns the tide against his father's enemy.

===== Armenia =====
In a 1991 article, researcher Suzanna A. Gullakian noted a similar combination between tale types 936*, "The Golden Mountain", and 400, "Man on a Quest for the Lost Wife", in Armenia. She also argued that this combination was "stable" and "part of the Armenian tale corpus", with at least 8 variants recorded.

===== Mordvin people =====
In an Erzya tale from the Mordvins titled "Рав-Жольдямо" ("Rav-Zholdyamo"), the youth Rav-Zholdyamo lives with his poor widow mother, until one day an old man pays them a visit and offers the boy a proposition: the youth is to accompany him to a mountain and climb its golden peak. Rav-Zholdyamo rides a lame horse and joins the man's journey to the golden mountain. When they arrive, the man kills the youth's horse, then bids him enter its insides and wait until a large raven flies in and carries the dead horse up the mountain. Atop the mountain, Rav-Zholdyamo exits the horse skin and fetches some golden stones; he pockets them in a bag and lowers them to the old man through a rope. After the old man takes the bag, he burns the rope and strands the youth upon the mountain. Some time later, Rav-Zholdyamo sees a kite menacing three ducks, and throws a rock at the larger bird to scare him away. The ducks thank him and agree to take him to their home at the foot of a mountain. The ducks take off their feather skins, become humans and take Rav-Zholdyamo as their guest. The youth begins to fall in love with the youngest duck maiden, and eventually hides her clothing to convince her to marry him. The third duck maiden agrees to be his wife, and they return to Rav-Zholdyamo's mother's hut. The youth gives the duck featherskin for his mother to hide, and makes her promise not to return it to his wife. One day, the maiden asks her husband for a green ring she left at her sisters' hut. He agrees to take his wife's ring, and, while he is away, the duck maiden tells his mother to give her the feather skin. She puts it on, turns into a bird and flies away. Rav-Zholdyamo comes back with the ring and is told by his mother his wife flew away. Rav-Zholdyamo begins a quest by going upstream: he meets three brothers, each a large old man, the first by a willow tree, the second by an elm tree, and the third by an oak tree. The Third brother tells the youth his gray duck wife is being held hostage by the large raven atop the Golden Mountain, and gives him a flying carpet and a cap of invisibility. Rav-Zholdyamo flies to the top of the Golden Mountain, distracts the raven, and takes his wife on the flying carpet back to his village. The tale was classified as a combination of types 936 (hero is hired by a man to go to a mountain and hides in an animal's carcass) and 400A (husband searches for wife). Russian scholarship noted that the tale was the singular attestation among the Mordvins with this combination, since type 936 was not registered, while stories about searching for the missing wife are popular.

==== Africa ====
===== Algeria =====
Scholar Hasan El-Shamy locates a similar tale in Algeria that shows the same type combination.

===== Tunisia =====
German linguist Hans Stumme published a Tunisian tale titled Hassan aus Bassra ("Hassan of Bassra"). In this tale, Hassan's father is a merchant, and he is an only son. After his father dies, Hassan opens up a shop, and is visited by the stranger who shows him the gold-making powder. Hassan invites the man to his house, but he drugs Hassan's coffee and takes him to the Cloud Mountain. The man tells his name is Ibrahim, the Magician, and he needs the boy for a job. Ibrahim kills a camel, hides Hassan inside and the vultures take him up the mountain. On the mountain top, there is a hut that Hassan enters and finds a tablet to give to Ibrahim. After the job is done, Ibrahim abandons Hassan up the mountain. Hassan escapes and finds a castle with jinn princess, who take them in. Some time later, the jinn princesses must return to their father's kingdom, and give Hassan a set of keys to the castle, forbidding him from opening a certain door. After they depart, the youth opens every door, including the forbidden one, and finds a beautiful garden with a water basin. Suddenly, ten pigeons come and alight near the basin, take off their feathers and become women, stay for a bit, then fly back. Hasan tells the jinn princesses of the incident and how he fell in love with the youngest of the pigeon maidens; the jinn princesses advise him to steal the feather cloak of the one he fancies the best in order to marry her. He follows their advice and gets the maiden's feather cloak, making her his wife. After some time, the magician Ibrahim appears again at the mountain with another victim; Hassan slays the magician, saving the newest apprentice from sharing the same fate as he once did, and gets Ibrahim's magic copper drum. Later, since he misses his mother, he goes back to Basra with his wife, Nur Ennisä, and introduces her to his mother. Hassan leaves for some time, and Nur Ennisä wants to go to the local bath house. Once she is there, Subida, the caliph's wife, admires her beauty and brings her to her court. The pigeon maiden is brought before her and asks her mother-in-law for her feather cloak; as soon as she puts it on, she turns back into a pigeon, asks her mother-in-law to tell Hassan to seek her and their children in Wakwak, and vanishes.

===== East Africa =====
In a Swahili tale titled Kisa Cha Hassibu Karim ad Dini na Sultani wa Nyoka, translated by Edward Steere as "The Story of Haseebu Kareem ed Deen and the King of the Snakes", in the frame story, a boy is born to a couple, but he is only named when he grows up: Haseebu Kareem ed deen. Some time later, he meets the King of Snakes in a gathering of people. One of the assembled people tell his story: he is Jan Shah, son of sultan Taighamus. Jan Shah recalls how he and some slaves followed a gazelle during a hunt. They insisted on chasing the gazelle across the sea and jumped on a boat to another island. On the island, the monkeys made him their king, but they found a house with an inscription saying that a way lied to the north, past plains filled with animals. Jan Shah and his slaves made their way through the plains, although his slaves died. Arriving at a city, Jan Shah found work with a man: he was to buy a camel's skin, hide in it, let the birds carry up a mountain and throw the man precious stones. After the work was done, Jan Shah was left on the mountain, but wandered off and met a man in a house. The man welcomed him and gave him the keys to house, forbidding him from opening a certain chamber. Jan Shah disobeyed and opened it; inside, a garden, and three birds had come, changed into maidens to bathe in a nearby stream, and flown away. Jan Shah told the old man the event, and he replied that they were daughters of a sultan of the genii, the youngest called Seyedati Shems. The old man suggested Jan Shah to steal her clothes. He followed his instructions, stole Seyedati Shems's garment and took with her to his father's land, where they married. Later, Jan Shah buried the garments under the floor, but one day his wife found it, put it on and flew to her father's realm. Before she departed, Seyedati had told a slave to inform Jan Shah of her flight, and, if he wanted her back, he would have to follow after her. Jan Shah took a journey there and found his wife's kingdom, where he introduced himself as her husband. Jan Shah regained his wife and both went back to his father with a genii retinue. One day, after Seyedati Shems left a bath in the river, she died, and Jan Shah dug a grave for her and another for him, to join her in death when his time had come.

===== Sudan =====
German ethnologue Leo Frobenius collected a tale from Kordofan with the title Der Silberschmied ("The Silversmith"): a father wants his sons to learn a skill. The elder, named Samkari, becomes a tinsmith, while the younger, named Ssaig, becomes a silversmith. With time, their father dies and they squander their fortune. Eventually, both brothers part ways: the elder goes back to his employer and marries his daughter, while Ssaig stays with his mother and opens a silversmithery. His mother warns him against "people from the desert". Eventually, one such person comes to his store with a gift: he says he is a gold dealer and gives Ssaig a piece of yellow wood, for him to use on tin and turn it into gold. After the man leaves, Ssaig asks a neighbour for some tin, melts the metal with the wood, and it becomes gold. Ssaig sells the gold. The next day, the gold dealer comes to his store and they talk about business, and Ssaig invites him home. The youth goes home and tell his mother about the guest, but she reminds him that the man is one of the people his father warned him against. During a meal, the gold dealer drugs Ssaig's sorbet with a potion that makes him unconscious, loads him up on his donkey and rides with the youth through the desert. The youth smells some salts the gold dealer sprays on his nose, comes to and is told they are near the mountain where the gold-producing herb sprouts. The gold dealer explains that they have to lure a "Gjau" ('eagle') with mutton skin so that the bird can carry him up the mountain. Ssaig hides inside the mutton skin and is taken by the eagle to the mountain top, where he gathers branches and throws to the gold dealer. The gold dealer loads enough branches of the trees and abandons Ssaig up the mountain. The youth notices the skeletons about (previous victims of the gold dealer) and decides to look for a wait. He walks through a forest until he reaches a "Gasr" (a tower). He prepares to knock on the door and faints. When he wakes up, he finds himself surrounded by seven beautiful maidens, who tell him they are the daughters of the Alledjenu king. The maidens explain that many young men have died due to the gold dealer's actions, but Ssaig decides to end his threat once and for all. For a year, he lives with the maidens as a brother, and, after a year elapses, the gold dealer is back with another victim. Ssaig is gives a "Saif" ('sword') by the maidens, and rides an eagle down the mountain to kill the gold dealer. The deed done, Ssaig says goodbye to the maidens and flies back to his mother with treasures.

==== Asia ====
===== Turkey =====
In the Typen türkischer Volksmärchen ("Turkish Folktale Catalogue"), by Wolfram Eberhard and Pertev Naili Boratav, both scholars indexed a similar tale type under TTV 198, "Der Diamantenberg" ("The Diamond Mountain"), with nine variants registered. In the Turkish tale type, a poor man finds work with a merchant and they go to a mountain to fetch diamonds; an eagle carries the man up the mountain, he tosses the gems to his companion, and is left stranded there; he reaches another land where he marries a woman, loses her, and goes after her. In four of the variants, the hero's wife is a swan maiden (who is the daughter of the Padishah of the Birds in two of them), who finds her garments and flees back home.

===== Iran =====
In the tale Prince Yousef of the Fairies and King Ahmad or its Russian translation by professor Mahomed-Nuri Osmanovich Osmanov, "Юсуф — шах пери и Малек-Ахмад" ("Yusuf, the Shah of the Peris and Malek-Ahmad"), a prince named Malek-Ahmad marries his sisters to three animals (a lion, a wolf and an eagle), and leaves home. He helps an old man carry bundles of firewood to his house. For his kind deed, the old man decides to take him in as another son. One day, Malek-Ahmad hears that a man is hiring people to work for him for 40 days, for a fine pay. Malek-Ahmad tells the old man he will return in 40 days, and goes to work for a Jew. The Jew and Malek-Ahmad ride to the foot of a mountain. The Jew orders the boy to kill the camel, remove its entrails, and hide inside, so that some giant birds carry him up the mountain. On the mountaintop, Malek-Ahmad throws some gems off to the Jew, who gathers them and abandons the boy there. Malek-Ahmad wanders off through the mountaintop and sees a palace in the distance. He enters and finds a div-mother, who warns him that her sons are div that may eat him, but they warm up to him and treat him like their brother. He takes shelter with a Div-family. The Div-matriarch gives Malek-Ahmad a set of keys and forbids him to open two doors. He does anyway: behind the first door, he releases a prisoner named Yusuf, the Shah of the Peris, who flies back to Mount Qaf; behind the second, he finds a garden where three doves become maidens by taking off their clothes. Malek-Ahmad hides the clothing of the youngest dove-maiden (identified as a "Peri" in the story), while her sisters depart. Malek-Ahmad marries the dove-maiden and she bears two sons. Some time later, they reach a village where he celebrates his wedding with the peri. However, his peri-wife notices that some luti intend to kill him and his sons and kidnap her, so she convinces him to return her belongings. The peri-wife puts on the garments, begs her husband to come find her on Mount Qaf and flies away with her children. The prince asks the Div-family about Mount Qaf, and they say their uncle, the wolf brother-in-law, may know the answer. Malek-Ahmad visits his brothers-in-law and asks them about the location of Mount Qaf. The eagle brother-in-law, in his castle, reads a spell from the Book of prophet Suleyman and summons all birds. A little bird tells the prince its eagle grandmother can take him there. After 40 days feeding the eagle and a journey to Mount Qaf, Malek-Ahmad arrives and drips a magical liquid on his eyes to become invisible. He finds his two sons getting water on the fountain and follows them to their house. He discovers his peri-wife and takes off the invisibility spell. His peri-wife says her brother is Yusuf, the very same person he rescued in the prison. Yusuf embraces Malek-Ahmad, gives him gifts and blesses his marriage to his sister. In his Catalogue of Persian Folktales, German scholar Ulrich Marzolph sourced this tale from the Azerbaijan region, in Iran.

===== Iraq =====
In an Iraqi tale collected by E. S. Drower with the title The Story Of Hasan Al-Basri, a Jewish jeweler and silversmith convinces a youth named Hasan Al-Basri to be his apprentice. They travel the desert and reach a mountain; the Jew skins a sheep and bids Hasan enter the sheepskin, so he is carried by an eagle to the mountaintop and he throws him some stones. Hasan follows the Jew's orders, but is abandoned by him on the mountain. Hasan walks to the edge of the mountain and jumps into the sea; he washes ashore and finds a large house where three daughters of the jinn live. The girls take him in as their human brother. After three years, they say they will pay a visit to their father and three jinn brothers, and give Hasan a set of keys, forbidding him to open a certain door. After they leave, Hasan opens every door, including the 40th one, where he finds a beautiful palace in a garden. Suddenly, three doves alight near a pool in the garden, take off their feather robes and play in the water; later, they fly back when they came. His three adoptive sisters arrive, and Hasan tells them he fell in love with the youngest dove maiden. The jinn sisters say the dove maiden, named Light-of-Morning (Nur-es-Sabah), is the youngest daughter of Shahzaban, a powerful king of Waqwaq. After 40 days, the dove maidens return; Hasan steals her feather cloak, stranding her in the garden while her sister fly away. Light-of-Morning marries Hasan and gives birth to two sons. In time, Hasan begins to miss his hometown (Basra), and is given three hairs to summon a magic mare to rush back to his mother. It happens thus. After living in Basra, Hasan leaves his wife with his mother, and goes back to his jinn sisters. While he is away, Light-of-Morning goes to the local hamman, despite her mother-in-law's warnings, and is admired by the local Khalifa's wife, so much so she is brought to her court. Cunningly, Light-of-Morning asks for her feather dress - which is her mother-in-law's possession -; she puts it on, turns it back to a dove and tells Hasan's mother to ask him to find her in Waqwaq, then flies away. When she reaches the roof of her father's palace in Waqwaq, her sisters, already waiting for her, take her to her father, who order her to be hanged by her hairs on a palm-tree. Back to Hasan, he goes back to Basra and discovers his wife's disappearance. Intent on getting her back, he goes back to his jinn sisters and explains his situation. The jinn sisters advise him to find their eldest brother, ruler of the small birds. Hasan visits him, who summons all birds to see the location of Waqwaq, to no avail. Hasan then visits a middle brother, who rules the large birds and the eagles, and a young brother. The latter summons a mistress of the daughters of the jinns, who can lead Hasan to Waqwaq. The old woman is brought to Hasan's presence, and advises him to wear a woman's veil and join with her in the desert, for the daughters of the jinns will pass before them. It happens thus, but Hasan cannot see Light-of-Morning among them. Later, Hasan finds two men quarreling over a cap of invisibility and a carpet that flies with a stick. He distracts the men and steals the objects, then uses the carpet to fly to Shahzaban's palace. Inside the palace, Hasan wears the cap and steals food for his wife and sons, then releases his family and flies with them to the jinn maidens's younger sorcerer brother. He congratulates Hasan on his success and asks for the cap. However, Shahzaban's army surrounds the sorcerer's castle; Hasan beats the stick on the ground; a black slave appears and Hasan commands him to provide an army to defeat his father-in-law's. Later, the family flies back to the other jinn brothers, where he leaves the carpet and the stick for safekeeping, and reach Basra. At the end of the tale, Hasan takes revenge on the Jew jeweler by abandoning him on top of the same mountain, saving another of his victims, and summons with a ring the elder jinn brother to menace the Khalifa of Basra in leaving Hasan and his family alone, lest the Khalifa incurs the wrath of the three jinn brothers and sisters.

===== Persian Kurdistan =====
Author and folklorist Howard Schwartz published a Jewish tale collected from Persian Kurdistan with the title The Stork Princess. In this tale, a youth named Aaron lives with his poor family. One day, a stranger pays them a visit and offers to take Aaron as his apprentice. Aaron and the stranger ride their camels to the base of a high mountain, on whose top lies a cave guarding a great treasure. Aaron rides the camel up the mountain slopes and enters the cave; inside, a vast treasure. The youth loads the camel with sacks of gems and gold and commands it down the mountain, then asks the stranger to send the animal up. The stranger denies his request and abandons him up the mountain. Back to Aaron, he begins to feel hungry and tries to find a way to escape the mountaintop: on one side, the slopes, on the other, the sea. He chooses to dive in the sea and swims for three days until he reaches a beach. Wandering a bit, he finds a large house, where a young woman welcomes him and gives him food. The young woman and her sisters take him in as their adopted brother and they live together. Some time later, the sisters are invited by her uncle for a wedding, and give Aaron a set of keys for him to explore house, except for one particular door. Aaron obeys at first, but one day decides to open the forbidden door, despite their warnings: he finds a beach on shore next to the sea, where three storks are bathing. Suddenly, the storks take off their feathers and become beautiful maidens, the third and youngest the most beautiful of all, who Aaron falls in love with. The storks fly away and the youth grows ill with longing. When his adoptive sisters return, they learn he opened the forbidden door and tell him the stork maidens are princesses from another kingdom that come once a month to bathe in the sea and fly back there. The next time the birds come, Aaron hides in a crack and takes the feathers from the third princess. He tricks her into going through the door, and she loses her magic powers to turn into a stork. Aaron and the now human stork princess marry, and they make a long journey back to his parents, then journey to the princess's kingdom. In his notes to the tale, Schwartz noticed that the story was a "variant" of The Tale of Hasan of Bassorah.

===== Yemen =====
Author Werner Daum collected a tale from a Yemeni source named Ḥādsch Ḥamūd al-Baydahi, and translated it to German. In this tale, titled Die vierzehn Königstöchter ("The King's Fourteen Daughters"), a man has two wives, the first Arab, and a concubine, two sons from each official wife and the third from the concubine. To determine the definitive proof of the better son, he hangs a sword over the throne, which the preferred son must hold. The concubine's son grabs the sword, unlike his half-brothers. The Arab woman tries to poison her stepsons' food, but a bird and a dog eat it in their place and die, alerting him of the danger. He decides to leave home accompanied by his non-Arab half-brother. After some adventures where they rescue princesses and kill an Afrit, the concubine's son goes to a coffee house and is approached by an Indian man with a business proposition: to go to India and become rich. The concubine's son and the Indian man reach a giant mountain, and the man tells the youth to kill a camel, skin it, enter its skin so he can be carried up the mountain by the birds, and once he is up there he is to throw some firewood to him. It happens thus, and he carried up the birds. Once there, the youth finds some corpses and a dying man, who warns him the same fate will befall the concubine's son. Despite the warning, the youth tosses the firewood to the Indian man, who abandons his companion to die on the mountain. Trapped on the mountain top and with the ocean around him, he prays to Allah to protect him and jumps in the water. After two days holding onto a barrel, he reaches an island with an extravagant palace that belongs to the seven daughters of the king of the Jinns of the West. The girls welcome him and adopt him as a brother. Some time later, the jinn princesses go on a journey and leave the youth alone, with a warning not to open the gate to their yard. The concubine's son ignores the warning and goes to the garden: there, he sights seven white doves alight near a pond and taking off their wings to become human maidens (whom the story explains are the daughters of the king of the Jinns of the East). The youth steals the wings of the youngest, to keep her in human form. The other princesses fly back to the skies as doves and abandon her sister. The jinn girl marries the human youth convinced by his adoptive jinn sisters, and the couple live in their palace. The youth then begin to miss home and is carried by one of his jinn sisters to his half-brother, who greets him and gives some slaves. The youth then returns to his homeland to avenge himself on his father and stepmother, but finds out both died in his absence, so he lives with his mother. Time passes, and the couple have two children. One day, the youth gives his mother his jinn wife's wings, asking her to hide it in a chest, and goes to visit his adoptive jinn sisters. After he leaves, a wedding is happening at the local king's palace and the monarch wants to invite the beautiful foreign woman to the celebration, so he sends some slaves to bring the jinn woman and her mother-in-law by force to the wedding. The jinn princess says she can dance if her mother-in-law brings her her feather dress. The mother-in-law denies any knowledge of such a garment, but the king forces her to produce it. The jinn princess puts it on, grabs her children, tells her mother-in-law her husband can find his family in the islands of Wāq Al Wāq, then flies off. There, the jinn princess is punished by the Jinn Queen. Back to the concubine's son, he goes back home and finds three graves for his wife and children, which are empty. His mother then reveals she flew off back to her insular homeland, and he decides to go after her. After four days, he meets two brothers, sons of an Afrit, who are fighting over three magical objects: a staff that summons a cadre of genies, a sword that helps in battle, and a Kūfīa that makes the wearer invisible. The concubine's son tricks the Afrit brothers and runs away with the objects. At a distance, he uses the staff to summon the genies and orders them to carry him to Wāq Al Wāq. Once he is on the island, he meets an old Jinn woman with large breasts, which he suckles on as a demonstration of trust. The Jinn elder suggests he writes to the Jinn Queen about his lost wife. It happens thus: the queen gathers all women of Wāq Al Wāq invites the concubine's son to identify his wife. He cannot do so, for his wife is not among the assembled ladies, but he takes a good look at the queen and recognizes his wife's features. The queen then discovers the stranger is her human brother-in-law, and orders him to be thrown in prison. In the dungeon, he escapes his cell by making himself invisible and goes to look for his wife, who is also a prisoner. He releases his wife from some hooks and takes his sons with them. The Jinn Queen orders her army to take them back, but the concubine's son uses the staff again to command the genies to defeat the army and to take his family back to his adoptive jinn sisters. The princess scolds their adoptive brother's wife, but everything is resolved: he burns his wife's wings, kills the treacherous Indian man, and moves out to the island of Al Dahlak. In his commentaries to the tale, Daum recognized that the story was an "adaptation" of the tale of Hassan of Basra, albeit with a "local [Yemeni] colour".

In a tale collected from a Yemeni American source with the title Hassan and the Swan Woman of the Island of the Djinn, in a village in Yemen, old Haroun has a young friend named Hassan. He convinces the youth to come with him to the island of the djinn (fire spirits) to help him get some gold from a mountain. They go to the island and reach the mountain. Haroun bids Hassan enter a leather bag so the eagles can carry him up the mountain, so the youth can throw bags of gold to him. The plan works and Haroun gets the bags Hassan throws him, then makes his way back to their village. Abandoned by Haroun, Hassan walks about the top of the mountain until he reaches a house where seven sisters live. The girls welcome him and let him live with them, but forbids him from entering their room when they leave for work. One day, after they depart, Hassan opens the forbidden room and finds a crystal lake; some swans fly to the lake, take off their featherskins to become women, and bathe in the water, then put on the feathers and fly away. Hassan falls in love with the oldest swan woman and begins to wither with longing. The seven sisters notice his emaciated look and are told he opened the door to their room. The girls explain the swans are djinn, and tell Hassan to steal the feather coat of the one he likes best the next time they come to bathe. It happens thus; Hassan marries the oldest swan woman and they have a son. He hides her feather coat in a suitcase, and goes back home to his mother. Hassan gives his mother the suitcase to hide, then goes back to the island of the djinn for an emergency. Meanwhile, back home, the sheikh's son's wedding is celebrated in the Hassan's home village. The swan wife dances to the people's amusement, and she says she can dance even better if she has her garment from her mother-in-law's house. The sheikh orders they fetch her garments and returns it to her. She puts it on, turns into a large swan and flies away with the baby on her beak. When she reaches the island of the djinn, her father, the king, locks her up in her room as punishment for marrying a human. Back to Hassan, he discovers his wife flew away and decides to go after her. He makes his way to the island, and meets two brothers quarreling about two magic objects: a sword that can teleport anywhere and a hat of invisibility. Hassan tricks the brothers, steals the objects for himself and sticks the sword on the ground to teleport to the island of the djinn. Once there, he puts on the hat and goes looking for his wife in the castle. He finds her inside her room and takes her and their child back to his village.

== Legacy ==
American author Piers Anthony reworked the tale as his fantasy novel Hasan.

== Bibliography ==
Sources

- New Arabian nights' entertainments. Selected from the original oriental ms. by Jos. von Hammer, and now first translated into English by George Lamb. Vol. 2. London: H. Colburn, 1826. pp. 1–130.
- Jacobs, Joseph. The book of wonder voyages. New York and London: G. P. Putnam's sons. 1919. pp. 127–185.
- Warner, Marina (2011). "Story 5 Hasan of Basra". Stranger Magic. Harvard University Press. pp. 117–125. ISBN 978-0-674-05530-8. JSTOR j.ctt2jbtr6.15.

Analysis

- Aarne, Antti; Thompson, Stith. The types of the folktale: a classification and bibliography. Third Printing. Folklore Fellows Communications FFC no. 184. Helsinki: Academia Scientiarum Fennica, 1973 [1961]. pp. 140–151.
- Marzolph, Ulrich; van Leewen, Richard. The Arabian Nights Encyclopedia. Vol. I. California: ABC-Clio. 2004. pp. 207–210. ISBN 1-85109-640-X (e-book).
- Marzolph, Ulrich (2020). "The Treacherous Treasure Hunter (ATU 936*)". 101 Middle Eastern Tales and Their Impact on Western Oral Tradition. Wayne State University Press. pp. 231–236. ISBN 978-0-8143-4775-1. Project MUSE chapter 2668118.
- Uther, Hans-Jörg; Fellows, Folklore (2004). FF Communications: The Types of International Folktales: A Classification and Bibliography, Based on the System of Antti Aarne and Stith Thompson. Suomalainen Tiedeakatemia, Folklore Fellows. pp. 247–265. ISBN 978-951-41-0963-8.
