= Ethnic Multicultural Media Academy =

British organization

The Ethnic Multicultural Media Academy (EMMA) is a British organization that raises awareness of discrimination through media campaigns and social networking.

The EMMA Awards was founded in 1997 by Bobby Syed and "seeks to promote diversity within the media industry by publicly recognising the levels of excellence achieved by the multicultural community, and the qualities that each ethnic group brings to the professional and commercial success of United Kingdom as a whole". The first award presentation took place in 1998 at The Dorchester Hotel, Park Lane, London, and was hosted by TV presenter Lisa Aziz and journalist/broadcaster Darcus Howe.

Prominent recipients include Lord Richard Attenborough, who received the 2001 Lifetime Achievement Award at the Grosvenor House Hotel. In 2000, EMMA honoured Nelson Mandela. Mahatma Gandhi (2002) and Bruce Lee (2004) both received EMMA's Legend Award.

The UK EMMAs are screened on the internet and accompanied by an online voting system. The BBC broadcast the ceremony until 2004. The ceremony officially ended in 2005 after a legal dispute with the show's sponsor, NatWest.

| Awards | 1998 | 1999 | 2000 | 2001 | 2002 | 2003 | 2004 |
|---|---|---|---|---|---|---|---|
| References | | | | | | | |
| Film Actor | | | David Harewood | Eddie Murphy | Denzel Washington | Jimi Mistry | Tom Cruise |
| Film Actress | | | Angela Griffin | Michelle Yeoh | Halle Berry | Salma Hayek | Maia Morgenstern |
| TV Actor | | | | Felix Dexter | Rudolph Walker | Cyril Nri | Art Malik |
| TV Actress | | | | Lucy Liu | Diane Parish | Angela Griffin | Parminder Nagra |
| Comedian Award | | | | Jeff Mirza | Omid Djalili | Ria Lina | Inder Manocha |
| Book, Novel | | Bernardine Evaristo | Zadie Smith | Vikram Seth | Amy Tan | Michael Moore | Åsne Seierstad |
| British Music Act | | | Bally Sagoo | Craig David | So Solid Crew | Ms. Dynamite | Lemar |
| World Music Act | | | | Africando All Stars | Nitin Sawhney | Tasha's World | Natacha Atlas |
| International Music Act | | | Santana | Destiny's Child | Alicia Keys | Justin Timberlake | The Black Eyed Peas |
| Media Personality Award | George Alagiah | Ian Wright | Yasmin Alibhai-Brown | Meera Syal | Moira Stuart; Ahmed Rashid | John Pilger | Greg Dyke |
| Newspaper Journalist | | | Vikram Dodd | Gary Younge | Gary Younge | Gary Younge | Yasmin Alibhai-Brown |
| Radio Journalist | Henry Bonsu | Henry Bonsu | Sanjiv Buttoo | Zubeida Malik | Zubeida Malik | Barnie Choudhury | Vanessa Feltz |
| TV Journalist | | Farah Durrani | Krishnan Guru-Murthy | Shiulie Ghosh | Rageh Omaar | Rageh Omaar | Lisa Aziz |
| Public Figure | | | Mel B | Kofi Annan | Bill Morris | Lucy Cope | Jocelyn Hurndall; Sophie Hurndall |
| Sport Personality | | | | Venus Williams | Nasser Hussain | Lennox Lewis | David Beckham; Thierry Henry |
| Lifetime Achievement | | Muhammad Ali | Nelson Mandela | Richard Attenborough | Maya Angelou | Stevie Wonder | Bill Morris |
| Legend | | | | | Mahatma Gandhi | Martin Luther King | Bruce Lee |

== Patrons ==
The patrons of the Ethnic Multicultural Media Academy (Awards) include Sir Trevor McDonald OBE, Dame Anita Roddick (Late), Donald Woods CBE (Late), Gulam Noon, Baron Noon, Lord Desai, Lord Ouseley, Darcus Howe and Jonathan Dimbleby. They have all backed EMMA since 1998.
