= Zubaida (name) =

Zubaida (or Zubaidah, Zubeida, Zubaydah, Zubeda, Subeyda, Sobeyda ) is an Arabic (زُبَيْدَة), feminine given name that means "soft-bodied", "like cream", and is also an idiom for prime (in beauty, in virtue, grace), originating from the fact that cream is the prime part of the dessert, or the core of something that is growing. It is mostly used in Africa and Asia.

Notable people with this name include the following:

== Given name ==
- Zubaidah bint Ja'far (766–831), the favourite wife of Harun al-Rashid
- Zübeyde Sultan (1728–1756), Ottoman princess, daughter of Sultan Ahmed III
- Zübeyde Hanım (1856–1923), mother of Turkish statesman Mustafa Kemal Atatürk
- Zubeida (1911–1988), Indian film actress
- Zubaida Yazdani (1916–1996), Indian historian
- Zubeida Agha (1922–1997), Pakistani artist
- Zubeida Begum (1926–1952), Indian film actress
- Zubaida Khanum (1935–2013), Pakistani playback singer
- Zubaida Tharwat (1940–2016), Egyptian actress
- Zubaida Gulshan Ara (1943/44–2017), Bangladeshi writer
- Zubaida Tariq (1945–2018), Pakistani chef
- Zubaida Jalal Khan (born 1959), Pakistani politician
- Zübeyde Kaya (born 1991), Turkish women's football defender
- Zübeyde Süpürgeci (born 1993), Turkish Paralympian athlete
- Zubaida Bai, Indian expert in health products
- Zubeida Malik, British journalist
- Zubeida Mustafa (1941–2025), Pakistani journalist
- Zubaida al-Meeki, Syrian colonel and dissident
- Zubaida Rahman, (born 1972), Bangladeshi physician, and the wife of politician Tarique Rahman

== Surname ==
- Sami Zubaida (1937–2025), American political scientist
