= Zubeida Malik =

British journalist and broadcaster

Zubeida Malik is a journalist, broadcaster, and radio presenter who worked for the BBC for over 20 years, including 18 years on the BBC's Flagship News programme Radio Four Today. Malik has also presented BBC's Radio 4 Pick of the Week and One to One and made many documentaries for Radio 4 and the BBC World Service.

On the Today programme, she reported from Pakistan, Afghanistan, Nigeria, Saudi Arabia, Northern Ireland, Israel, and Gaza. Her reportage included foreign reporting and stories in the UK. She covered the murder of Damilola Taylor extensively and reported on several high-profile terrorism trials. Malik has been reporting on Osama bin Laden and Al-Qaeda since the 1990s and was one of the first journalists to look into extremist groups holding secret military training camps and encouraging young men to become jihadis.

Malik has interviewed key figures for the BBC, including Kofi Annan, President Musharraf, Tony Blair, Prince Saud Al Faisal, Desmond Tutu, the spiritual leader of Hamas, Sheikh Yassin, and a rare interview with Akbar Etemad.

== Career ==
Malik's work for the Today programme has included interviews, war zone reportage, domestic social analysis and investigative work. She was one of the first reporters to get into Pakistan after September 11, where she interviewed Mullah Zaeef of the Taliban and reported on the war from Afghanistan for the BBC. Malik has reported on the riots in Genoa, terrorist attacks in Saudi Arabia and was the first female reporter for the BBC to report from the Hajj in Saudi Arabia.

As a reporter on Newsnight, she did one of the few interviews with the parents of Shafilea Ahmed, who were found guilty and jailed for her murder. She led an investigation into female genital mutilation, which at the time was a subject rarely discussed. Malik has also written several opinion pieces for The i Paper and also has written for The Times Red Box.

== Awards ==
- Carlton TV Multicultural Achievement Award for Television and Radio.
- 2002 EMMA Best Radio News Journalist.
- 2002 Media Personality of the Year at the Asian Women of Achievement Awards.
- 1997 BT Press Award for Radio News Broadcaster of the year.
- 2001 EMMA Best Radio Journalist.
- 2000 Foreign Press Association Young Journalist of the Year.
- 2004 She was voted as one of the Good Housekeeping role Models.
