= Telidon =

Canadian videotex/teletext service

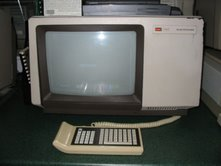
- Electrohome Telidon terminal, typical of the ones used as part of the TABS system. This rare example is found at the Personal Computer Museum in Brantford, Ontario.
- Developer: Communications Research Centre (CRC), Herb Bown
- Type: Videotex
- Launched: 1978
- Discontinued: 31 March 1985
- Platform: NAPLPS
- Status: Discontinued

Telidon (from the Greek words τῆλε, tele "at a distance" and ἰδών, idon "seeing") was a videotex/teletext service developed by the Canadian Communications Research Centre (CRC) during the late 1970s and supported by commercial enterprises led by Infomart in the early 1980s. Most work on the system ended after 1985, having failed to build critical mass.

The CRC referred to Telidon as a "second generation" videotex system, offering improved performance, 2D colour graphics, multilingual support and a number of different interactivity options supported on various hardware. With additional features added by AT&T Corporation, and 16 other contributors in North America and supported by the Federal Government, Telidon was redefined as a protocol and became the NAPLPS standard.

A number of Telidon systems were rolled out, including GRASSROOTS for the Province of Manitoba, SOI for Venezuela, Compuserve, Los Angeles Times in California, EPIC for General Motors, NOVATEX for Teleglobe Canada and the Swiss PTT nationwide application. These failed to demonstrate compelling functionality, and the auxiliary equipment costs remained high. Eventually, on 31 March 1985, the Canadian government support for the project ended and the various commercial services based on it closed shortly thereafter.

Telidon saw limited use after that, in niches like informational displays in airports and similar environments. NAPLPS did appear in several other products, notably the Prodigy online service and some bulletin boards. Telidon had a lasting legacy on the hardware side; its NABTS communications system found re-use years later in WebTV for Windows.

== History ==
=== Genesis ===
Herb Bown is widely considered to be the "father" of Telidon. Bown had been working in the computer graphics field since the late 1960s, originally using plotters but later moving to video systems. Starting in 1970, Bown and a team at the CRC started working on a "Picture Description Instruction" (PDI) format to encode vector graphics information. An interpreter, the "Interactive Graphics Programming Language" (IGPL), read the PDI codes and rasterized them for display. By this time the team consisted of Bown, Doug O'Brien, Bill Sawchuck, J.R. Storey and Bob Warburton.

As the work continued, the team decided that locking the system to the particular hardware they were using was not appropriate, and started modifying the PDI system to be based on alphanumeric codes instead of binary numbers. A major advantage to this approach is that the data can be sent over common communications channels instead of relying on an 8-bit clean link to the host computer. In 1975 the CRC contracted Norpak to develop an interactive colour display terminal based on the new alphanumeric PDI. The CRC had patented several of the technologies by the end of 1977; a touch-sensitive input mechanism, the basic graphics system, and the interactive graphics programming language.

By the mid-1970s several European countries were in the process of introducing videotex and teletext services. There was considerable interest within the industry, and in the media, suggesting that online services would be the "next big thing". Comments to the effect that "Within the next few decades, people may be able to access much of the published information in the world from their living rooms by using videotex," were common in the trade press.

The CRC was able to interest the Department of Communications (DoC), their superiors within the federal government, to fund development of their system into the basis for a videotex service. Unlike the systems being developed in Europe and in Japan, the Canadian system would offer high-quality 2D graphics, higher speed, and could be used for one-way fixed or menued displays (teletext), two-way systems based on modems (videotex), or they could combine the two, allowing information to be sent to the customer in the video signal, and returned via modem.

=== Telidon development ===
On 15 August 1978, the DoC (whose technical side is now part of the Industry Canada) held a press conference and formally announced the Telidon project to the public, demonstrating a large video display sending information to a minicomputer over an acoustic coupler modem. They outlined a four-year development plan that included funding for further technical development at the CRC, the production of several hundred terminals that would be lent out to industry for development studies, as well as funds for marketing and lobbying in videotex standards negotiations.

In 1979 the DoC formed the Canadian Videotex Consultative Committee to advise the Minister on ways to commercialize the CRC's work, and develop videotext services within Canada. The committee held four meetings during the initial four-year development plan, and coordinated a number of field trials with broadcasters, telephone companies, cable television firms, manufacturers and various information providers. During the same period, the Task Force on Service to the Public was given the job of using Telidon as a way to provide public access to government information and services.

By late 1979 Norpak had developed a version of the Telidon decoder that was housed in a box about the size of a modern digital cable set top box. A menu selection keyset, about the size and shape of a contemporary calculator, connected to it using a ribbon cable. With the hardware in place, the CRC started working with telecommunications providers to test the system in production settings. Many of the major Canadian carriers expressed strong interest, and a number of test systems were ready to roll out by the early 1980s. Excitement was high; the 19 November 1981 issue of The Globe and Mail quoted a representative at the Canadian Computer Show and Conference in Toronto claiming that "Telidon may become as commonly used as the telephone and will have just as great a social impact." They were not alone in predicting great things for the technology:

It is no exaggeration to say that the telecommunications marketplace in Canada was gripped by Telidon fever from late 1979 to late 1982. Hope and belief displaced analysis and reason: hope and belief in technology – science-based technology – as an agent of change, a bringer of novelty, and enhancer of life. After all, there was a revolution taking place – the communications revolution. So we were told.

In a radio broadcast in 1980, Douglas Parkhill, the deputy minister of research at the DoC outlined some of the potential uses, from financial information, to theatre reservations, with the ability to pay and print out tickets from the system.

=== Public testing ===
The release of Norpac's Telidon terminal led to announcements by broadcasters and news organizations who would be rolling out test systems starting late that year. However, a variety of delays pushed back most of these programs into 1980. The race to have the first operational deployment was won by the small town of South Headingley, just west of Winnipeg, part of an experimental system being deployed by the Manitoba Telephone System (MTS), the local cable operator.

Named for Ida Cates, Manitoba's first woman telephone operator in the 1880s, "Project Ida" was part of a wider rollout of advanced cable technologies that MTS had been planning since 1978 to study ways to use up the bandwidth capabilities of newer cable systems. Services included Telidon, cable telephony, pay TV service using outdoor converters (instead of set top boxes), and low-bandwidth backchannel data services for gas and electrical billing and alarm services.

The Telidon services that formed part of Project Ida were created by Infomart, a Toronto-based company set up to provide Telidon content. It was hosted on two computers set up in Winnipeg and run by MTS, providing a 4800 baud channel to the in-home terminals. Originally scheduled for January 1980, delays pushed this back to mid-year. Ida ran until 1981, when most of the services were dropped and the cables returned to normal analog signals, although an offshoot using optical cable was carried out in Elie, rotating the terminals though many households in the area.

Ida was followed by several Canadian companies starting similar projects. In early 1980, TVOntario, the educational television channel run by the Ontario government, set up 45 terminals in the Toronto area. In April 1981, New Brunswick Telephone set up a system practically identical to Project Ida with a full suite of services, with somewhere between 20 and 100 terminals. The same month, Alberta Government Telephones started "Project VIDON", a smaller modem-based test in the Calgary area. A month later, Bell Canada announced their "Vista" project in Toronto and Montreal, in partnership with the Toronto Star and the Southam Press who would provide content. This test eventually expanded to between 500 and 1000 terminals.

Telidon generated interest outside Canada as well. A major foreign sale was made in July 1980 to the government of Venezuela, who set up a test system to provide information on health, social and economic aid programs to people moving into Caracas from rural areas.

A number of U.S. companies also expressed an interest, and started plans for their own Telidon-based teletext systems. As early as 1978, AT&T Corporation and CBS had been experimenting with the idea of a videotex service, and were drawn towards the Telidon efforts. In 1982 they introduced an experimental system known as "Venture One" in Ridgewood, New Jersey, equipping some homes with standalone terminals from AT&T, and others with set-top boxes. The test ran for seven months from 1982 to 83, and was considered a success, so much so that AT&T publicly announced plans to introduce a commercial system in 1984.

General Motors' EPIC Project used special user access kiosks with video-disk based motion video and sound integrated with Teldion data arriving from the data centre in Flint, Michigan. Kiosks were distributed to hundreds of shopping malls and Buick dealers in various states. Users were able to leave their addresses for future contact, request car brochures or explore all technical and visual data with motion and sound to see all the car models available. This particular project was the single largest sale of Telidon in North America and allowed users to examine car models without speaking with a car salesperson.

=== Telidon becomes NAPLPS ===
AT&T started a standardization effort with Bell and the DoC. AT&T contributed two major additions to the system; the ability to define your own character sets, and the ability to wrap up multiple graphics commands into a "macro". The former provided not only for international characters, but also for the creation of small graphics that could be sent with a low transmission cost, which is useful in certain roles where the graphics can be arranged in a grid, like a chessboard. The later allowed the programmers to create a commonly used graphical element, the AT&T logo for instance, and save it to a macro. The graphic can then be recreated with a single instruction in any page that needed it.

The resulting system emerged in early 1983 as NAPLPS, while the transmission method that encoded information into the vertical blank interrupt of a TV signal became the NABTS standard. Major articles in Byte Magazine introduced the NAPLPS system to a wider audience, spread over a four-month period in the February, March, April, and May 1983 issues. With the standard complete, the U.S. teletext plans started moving forward. NAPLPS' ability to draw complex graphics was particularly interesting to U.S. information vendors such as Compuserve, as it allowed them to draw network or advertiser logos.

By this point the technical development of Telidon was complete, and that portion of the Canadian government's involvement wound down in the summer of 1983. Further efforts were aimed at helping develop a commercial marketplace for Telidon systems and content, running for another year.

=== Commercial efforts ===
One of the longest-lived Telidon deployments was "Project Grassroots", a follow-on to the services developed as part of the earlier Project Ida and run on its machines in Winnipeg. Unlike Ida, Grassroots ran on geographically distributed modems instead of cable links and was aimed specifically at farmers, providing weather reports, agrochemicals notices and other information, as well as optional links to live commodities pricing on various exchanges. Prices were high: in addition to purchasing a terminal there was an additional one-time $100 set-up fee, the annual fee was $150, and there was a $19.00/hr charge to connect to the service, and another $6.00/hr for "communications". Nevertheless, Grassroots grew into a system that distributed 20,000 pages of information to farmers created by Infomart. Based in Winnipeg, Grassroots expanded to serve Alberta, Saskatchewan, northern Ontario, and in 1985, the northern United States.

A significant showcase for the Telidon system was set up for the Third General Assembly of the Inuit Circumpolar Council, hosted in Frobisher Bay on Baffin Island in July 1983. A database of information about the conference and its services was hosted by Teleglobe Canada in Toronto on their Novatex system, with the information translated into English, French, Danish, Inuktitut, Greenlandic, Labradorian, Inupiag, Yupik and Western Arctic. Sixteen Telidon terminals, supplied by Microtel, were located at various sites in Frobisher Bay, with additional terminals in Vancouver, Washington, D.C., Copenhagen, Anchorage, Bethel, Utqiagvik, Nuuk, as well as other northern communities. Communications were provided by Bell Canada, Teleglobe, Greenland Telecommunications and the Danish Post and Telegraph.

The Canadian government also invested in Telidon as a way of distributing graphical information. Transport Canada ran a system called "TABS" that installed terminals in many airports, where pilots could quickly look up weather information and NOTAMs. Statistics Canada also used Telidon as a way to distribute graphs and other information in their CANSIM system using their TELICHART software that converted tables of data into NAPLPS commands. Environment Canada used Telidon terminals to produce video feeds that could then be broadcast on local cable feeds.

In the Toronto area, "Teleguide" terminals were common fixtures at larger shopping malls, government buildings (e.g. Scarborough Civic Centre) and notably the Toronto Eaton Centre. Run by London, Ontario's Cableshare, the system relied on an 8085-based microcomputer which drove several NAPLPS terminals fitted with touch screens, all communicating via Datapac to a back-end database. The system offered news, weather and sports information along with shopping mall guides and coupons. Rollouts were announced in several other cities as well.

The largest efforts were made in the United States. After the Venture One experiments in 1982/3, AT&T decided not to pursue a videotex service of its own, but instead provide service and support to other companies who wanted to. CBS invested considerable capital in the development of their ExtraVision service, which also included closed captioning and channel information along with more traditional Telidon information. Affiliate stations could also insert their own content into the streams, although the high cost of the systems needed to do this made it relatively rare.

AT&T also partnered with Knight-Ridder Newspapers to form Viewdata, a holding company that operated the "Viewtron" service. Test marketed in Florida in 1980, the service expanded to the entire southern Florida area by 1983, and then expanded to much of the eastern seaboard. Viewdata started primarily as a news service, but over time included more and more features. As it operated over modems in a pure videotex format, it was able to offer a variety of two-way services including e-mail and bulletin boards. A similar system was "Gateway", run by AT&T and the Los Angeles Times.

In 1984 Tribune Media Services (TMS) and the Associated Press operated a cable television channel called "AP News Plus" that provided NAPLPS-based news screens to cable television subscribers in many U.S. cities. The news pages were created and edited by TMS staffers working on an Atex editing system in Orlando, Florida, and sent by satellite to NAPLPS decoder devices located at the local cable television companies. The images were rendered locally, and then sent out as normal television signals to the customers. This avoided the need to send entire channels of video over satellite to the affiliate stations, instead, a small amount of data was sent and allowed the video to be recreated, for significantly less cost.

=== Problems ===
Test deployments demonstrated the problems that most other teletext systems also discovered: without an enormous amount of content, viewer interest is difficult to maintain. While large Telidon deployments might hold tens of thousands of pages, users were able to quickly exhaust the content in their particular areas of interest, suggesting that systems would have to contain hundreds of thousands of pages in order to remain interesting for longer periods. As Gordon Thompson of Bell-Northern Research put it, "all of the excitement is in the expectation; the reality is really quite disappointing."

Most teletext systems, Telidon included, were created in the context of the broadcast model, where the content would be provided by large vendors and then pushed one-way to the user in a fashion similar to television or newspapers. Interactivity was generally limited to menu selections or providing information on forms (like online banking). This placed the entire burden of creating the content on the service providers and their partners, an expensive and time-consuming process. Since much of the content in question was already available on different media controlled by the same companies, teletext services also had the problem of competing with incumbent mediums that were less expensive and better developed.

Telidon was also expensive. When it was introduced the DoC expected terminals to be available for $200 to $300 by 1982, but this did not come to be. The largest suppliers of terminals were Electrohome, Norpak and Microtel, whose terminals ranged between $1,800 and $2,500. During the development period the hardware manufacturers felt that demand would drive down prices to less than $600, however, results from trials indicated that even this would be considered too expensive for the mass market.

=== Telidon disappears ===
By the mid-1980s, home computers with graphics capabilities similar to Telidon had already arrived, driving prices to points far below even the simplest Telidon terminal. A generation of machines like the Macintosh, Amiga, and Atari ST were entering the market with capabilities Telidon systems could not match. At the same time, information services like CompuServe and The Source were offering a usable online experience that Telidon failed to offer.

For all of these reasons, interest in Telidon, and Videotex in general, quickly faded. One reason was the issue of continued funding which the Government hoped would come from private publishing companies such as The Globe and Mail, or The Toronto Star as most likely candidates. During the latter part of 1983 and early 1984 of the Informart CEO Dave Carlisle's reign, private publishing corporations couldn't find a suitable approach and this resulted in D. Carlisle's resignation with severe impact on Infomart, the flagship of Telidon in rough seas.

The government's funding of the Telidon efforts came to an official end on 31 March 1985, at which point $69 million had been spent not counting the revenue expended by Infomart who had made national and international sales in excess of $20M. It was estimated that another $200 million had been invested by various industry partners, $100 million of that by Bell Canada. Most of the early test systems had ended their runs by 1982, while the commercial systems persevered for a few years longer; NBC's system ended in January 1985, and then ExtraVision, Viewtron and Gateway in March 1986. In spite of these services finding some level of consumer demand, none were able to find a pricing structure that paid for their operation while still being interesting to their consumer base.

Telidon systems continued to be used as a one-way medium for some time. A common use was to use Telidon terminals to produce video that was then broadcast for viewing as closed-circuit television signals to conventional televisions, rather than sending the digital information to terminals connected to those televisions. Systems like this were common for informational displays in airports and other public areas, as well as information displays for cable TV stations.

=== Legacy ===
Rather than the failure of Telidon as a promising technology or efforts made, Telidon's seemingly slow international acceptance and North America's sluggishness in pushing it to higher level of functionality was a topic of considerable discussion and disappointment in Canada, part of a similar and wider conversation on the entire concept of videotex that took place in the late 1980s and early 1990s. Many of the Telidon criticisms focused on the role of government in development of the systems, pushing a technology that no one really wanted.

After most of the commercial efforts had ended, NAPLPS received a fresh breath of life as the basis of the Prodigy online service. In the time between efforts like Viewtron and the launch of Prodigy in 1988, personal computers with the ability to view NAPLPS graphics with ease had become common, and modem speeds had increased to the point where the data was no longer overwhelming. After a promising start, Prodigy management invoked a series of blunders that seriously upset their customer base, and the arrival of the World Wide Web in the mid-1990s killed it off.

NABTS, the communications protocol for embedding data in the TV signal, also saw continued use after the Telidon project ended. It was widely used for closed captioning support, although not the only system available. It was also used for Microsoft's WebTV for Windows and Intel's Intercast. Both used custom tuners, in the form of plug-in cards for PCs, that captured the information encoded into the VBI or even an entire TV channel.

For his work on Telidon, Herb Bown received the Order of Canada and the gold medal for engineering excellence from the Association of Professional Engineers of Ontario. The Touche Ross New Perspectives Award was awarded to Herb Bown and Doug O'Brien. Bown later formed IDON Corp to develop interactive teaching materials.

== See also ==
- Alextel - videotex service developed by Bell Canada following the closure of Telidon
- Ceefax - the BBC's long running teletext service
- DATAPAC
- Minitel - videotex online service developed in France by Postes, Télégraphes et Téléphones
- Prestel - videotex service developed by British Telcom
- Viewdata
