= Electra (teletext) =

American teletext service

- Screenshot of Electra's front page from 1985.
- Developer: Taft Broadcasting
- Type: Teletext
- Launched: 1982
- Discontinued: 1993
- Platform: World System Teletext
- Status: Discontinued

Electra was a teletext service in the United States that was in operation from 1982 up until 1993, when it was shut down due to a lack of funding, and discontinuation of teletext-capable television sets by the only US television manufacturer offering teletext capability at the time, Zenith. It was owned, operated and maintained by Cincinnati-based Taft Broadcasting (specifically at their flagship station, WKRC-TV, which had debuted the service in their area first) and Tulsa, Oklahoma-based Satellite Syndicated Systems (SSS), later known as Tempo Enterprises, in cooperation with cable/satellite TV station Superstation WTBS (now TBS, formerly owned by Turner Broadcasting System, now owned by Warner Bros. Discovery), who carried Electra's data on their vertical blanking interval. SSS's own TV network, the Satellite Program Network (later renamed to Tempo Television), carried the service before it was shut down in 1989 (Tempo having sold their transponder space to NBC, who used it to launch CNBC). The service was also available to C-band satellite dish users via the Galaxy 1 and Satcom 3R satellites.

Electra was America's answer to the British Ceefax or ORACLE systems, providing news headlines, weather, entertainment/lifestyle info, and other information. The service was originally structured with hard news occupying the first 65 pages; the remainder was used for non-news sections, including TV listings and children's content. (When the service began national distribution, only 50 or so pages of national content were carried.) Electra used the World System Teletext (WST) protocol, the same protocol used by Ceefax and ORACLE, as well as by other teletext services in the rest of the European continent.

Electra was later joined by another teletext service on higher-numbered pages, an SSS-created service called Tempo Text (originally named Cabletext); it provided pages of 15-minute delayed stock quotes from the NYSE, AMEX and OTC, and the latest business news. Electra occupied pages 100 to 199, while Cabletext/Tempo could be found on pages 201 through 212.

After beginning test broadcasts over WKRC in July 1982 (with a demonstration in November via the VBI of WAVY-TV in Norfolk, VA), Taft announced plans to partner with Zenith in January 1983, agreeing to a five-year deal in hopes of persuading other television stations and manufacturers to use the WST system. Taft would create the teletext magazine, while Zenith would design and sell teletext decoders. Taft president Dudley S. Taft indicated they preferred the WST system to the more-advanced NABTS teletext standard favored by CBS and NBC in large part because unlike NABTS, WST service and decoders were commercially practical, with WST's ability to retain information in cases of poor reception also being a major factor.

The service officially debuted in July 1983, with Zenith stocking their teletext decoders (at a price of $300) in Cincinnati-area retailers and rolling out a mobile van unit to demonstrate Electra to interested consumers. Taft also reassured viewers that the Electra service would not interfere with their ability to receive closed-captioning on ABC network programming (WKRC was an affiliate of ABC at the time), as the Electra service was carried in a different part of the VBI than ABC's national captions were; to prevent viewers from having to need two decoders, the Electra staff began transcribing the ABC closed-captioning to be carried over Electra. However, adoption of the decoders was slow, mostly thanks to them being only compatible with later-model Zenith television sets.

The logo for the Keyfax service.

SSS began to carry the Electra feed, along with their own Cabletext service, over the VBIs of WTBS and SPN in February 1985, in part because of the Chicago-based Keyfax service (which SSS had been carrying over the VBI of WTBS since 1982 as a pay service; it had been broadcast in the Chicago area only by WFLD since 1981, and a joint venture of Centel Corporation, Honeywell, and Field Communications) dropping their over-the-air broadcast services in the fall of 1984 in hopes of reorienting themselves as a two-way videotex service akin to Viewtron (which would fail, with Keyfax ceasing service in 1986). The service was transmitted by way of a high-speed data link operated by AT&T between WKRC's facilities in Cincinnati and SSS's uplink facility in Douglasville, GA; Zenith's sales of teletext decoders were slow by this point, mostly due to the steep $300 price. SSS attempted to boost interest by offering cable converters with integrated teletext decoders.

In a further attempt to boost the service, in 1986 Taft attempted to get their other 11 television stations to carry Electra by that summer, however, due to corporate instability at Taft (which culminated in their restructuring as Great American Broadcasting in 1987), only three other stations (WTVN in Columbus—soon to become WSYX as FCC rules about overlapping signals, in this case with WKRC, forced the station's sale amid Taft's restructuring as Great American -- KOVR in Sacramento, and WIHT in Ann Arbor; the latter station was owned by SSS) carried Electra in their own VBIs. SSS (by now known as Tempo) also attempted to encourage local cable providers and other broadcasters to strip the Electra service from the WTBS signal and broadcast it over their own VBIs; these efforts did not meet success. At the same time, Zenith—which had failed to sell many teletext decoders due to their pricing, with Zenith's VP of marketing Bruce Huber quoted as saying "[we only sold a] few dozen. There simply wasn't enough value to warrant consumers paying that kind of money."—began to sell television sets with teletext decoders built directly into the circuitry; nonetheless, this did little to speed adoption, as the majority of Zenith sets with built-in teletext were the expensive, top-of-the-line Digital System 3 sets, as opposed to the cheaper, textless Advanced System 3 sets also offered at the time. An additional hurdle faced was that cable systems would sometimes strip everything out of the VBI so as to broadcast their own data, chiefly data related to addressable cable converters used by their customers.

Electra was one of the very few American teletext services in operation, due in part to the aforementioned battles over teletext protocols (as the FCC ultimately did not select a teletext standard for television stations and manufacturers to use). CBS' ExtraVision and NBC's NBC Teletext services, as well as the short-lived Time Teletext and some other experimental services, used NABTS, but ceased operations by the end of the decade thanks to a lack of support or wide availability of the expensive NABTS decoders. A few other services, using the WST protocol, were offered by some large-market TV stations in the US throughout the 1980s, such as Metrotext from KTTV in Los Angeles (which utilized Electra for national content after they launched their service during the 1984 Summer Olympics) and the aforementioned Keyfax. An additional duo of services, Viewdata and Infovizion, were created by WHA-TV in Madison, WI and carried nationally by the Discovery Channel in the late 1980s.

Great American Broadcasting, which operated Electra on an annual budget of just $250,000, remained committed to the service through 1988. Due to Electra's obscurity by that point (with one teletext user having to educate their local Zenith dealer on the function), it is currently unclear as to when the service was actually shuttered (by which point it was the last widescale teletext service operating in the US; some local services, including KSL-TV's dual teletext/videotex service, and the AGTEXT service, created by Kentucky Educational Television, continued for some time afterwards); the last known reference to it in Broadcasting magazine (currently Broadcasting & Cable) is when the fledgling satellite television provider PrimeStar announced plans to add Electra to their service in July 1992.
