= Boston CitiNet =

Local online service

- Developer: Considine Computing Services (CCS)
- Type: Videotex
- Launched: 1982; 44 years ago
- Discontinued: 1990; 36 years ago
- Status: Discontinued
- Members: 5,000 in 1985, 45,000 peak

Started in 1983, Boston CitiNet was a local online service operated by Applied Videotex Systems, Inc. of Belmont, Massachusetts. The service allowed modem-equipped personal computer users to dial-in and access a range of information and messaging services including chat, forums, email and a variety of content. There were several other companies offering paid/subscription services as the time like The Source, CompuServe and Boston-based Delphi. Boston Citinet was unique since it was free to access and was supported by advertising. Messaging services such as email and chat required registration and a monthly fee of $9.95 - an early example of the now popular freemium business model.

== History ==
Originally launched in 1982 under the name YellowData ("let your modem do the walking"), the service was renamed Boston CitiNet in 1985. The software platform for the service was developed by Considine Computing Services (CCS), a DEC system integrator. It initially ran on a DEC MicroPDP-11 computer with over 100 dial-up phone lines coming into the basement of a former A&P store on Trapelo Road in Belmont. In 1985, it was upgraded to run on a DEC Micro-Vax II. The founders of AVS were Thomas Considine and Richard Koch who were joined by Myron Kassaraba and John Pollock.

One of the sources of CitiNet's success was that it was "FREE, EASY and ASCII". This compared to some of the more graphically based systems that required special hardware to access. Viewtron, an early videotex service offered by Knight-Ridder and AT&T required a special $900 terminal called Sceptre for access.

CitiNet was a prototype of the future Internet portals, with daily content, online shopping, and social activities. Some of the early advertisers were several local employment agencies, auto leasing agencies, magazine publishers such as Byte and theater chain Sack Theaters. Online vendors sold cheese, cookies, music disks, VCRs, fax machines, and groceries. One of the more popular services was the Daily Horoscope by astrologer Lillian Bono. A partnership made CitiNet the "official online service for the Boston Computer Society (BCS)", also, the official videotex service of the World Trade Center (Boston). Sports was covered by reporters (like today's bloggers) and Richard Koch could be found in the Boston Celtics or Red Sox locker rooms and posting updates from the press box using a TRS-80 Model 100. Then as now, social interaction led the day, with free email, multi-user chat, and dozens of forums (from cat lovers to VCR help).

There were several pioneering services developed by AVS or their partners such as:

- SKIDATA - this was a service that provided ski conditions from a data feed supplied by New England Ski Areas Council (NESAC) that we accessible online via modem, using a 24-hour ski conditions line that was powered by DECTalk or at a LaserDisc kiosk, developed by Telematic Systems, that was located in the flagship SkiMarket retail store on Commonwealth Avenue in Boston. The service was a smash hit and was featured in Businessweek.
- REALNET - an online real estate service developed through a partnership with Tom Pfau.
- BOCOEX - an online computer marketplace for Alex Randall’s Boston Computer Exchange.
- TRADECARD INTERNATIONAL - Online barter exchange.

In 1985, CitiNet had over 5,000 paying subscribers. In the period from 1985 to 1989, AVS and CitiNet participated in NYNEX's Info-Look and Bell Atlantic’s Information Gateway projects as well as being contracted by Pacific Bell to provide the local information services for Project Victoria, an early trial of ISDN services to the home tested in the community of Danville, CA. CitiNet also pioneered the practice of “click-stream analysis” to support the advertising business. which is the basis of modern predictive analytics. AVS through their franchises and gateway projects produced some of the first newspaper “online versions” – Newsday Online, Globe Entertainment, Philadelphia Inquirer, and the Omaha World-Herald.

In the mid 1980s the Regional Bell Operating Companies (RBOCs) had installed packet-switching (X.25) networks, from Siemens and Northern Telecom, and wanted to encourage the burgeoning dial-up community to find a home on regional networks. CitiNet provided and operated the information hosting service for Project Victoria, with PacBell providing X.25 transport and trialing ISDN over twisted pair, Apple provided Macintoshes for each home, and the San Francisco Chronicle provided news stories. Considine designed the gateway architecture for NYNEX's "Information Gateway", in which a Siemens EDX-P network provides a virtual portal to manage all session switching between services. And AVS stood up a "Gateway Service Bureau" in Pennsylvania for Bell Atlantic, and put the Philadelphia Inquirer online in 1988, and other local Pennsylvania services.

Boston CitiNet's user base peaked at approximately 45,000 users. It continued to operate until 1990.
