= World System Teletext =

Teletext standard

World System Teletext encodings
- Examples of WST Latin G0 sets: reference version (US-ASCII) and United Kingdom version (BS_viewdata). National codes in red.
- Standard: ETS 300 706, ITU-R (CCIR) BT.653
- Other related encodings: ISO 646, ISO 2022, ISO 6937

World System Teletext (WST) is the name of a standard for encoding and displaying teletext information, which is used as the standard for teletext throughout Europe today. It was adopted into the international standard CCIR 653 (now ITU-R BT.653) of 1986 as CCIR Teletext System B.

== Development ==
WST originally stems from the UK standard developed by the BBC and the UK Independent Broadcasting Authority in 1974 for teletext transmission, extended in 1976 as the Broadcast Teletext Specification. With some tweaks to allow for alternative national character sets, and adaptations to the NTSC 525-line system as necessary, this was then promoted internationally as "World System Teletext". It was accepted by CCIR in 1986 under international standard CCIR 653 (now ITU-R BT.653) as one of four recognised standards for teletext worldwide (most commonly referred to as CCIR Teletext System B).

=== WST in Europe ===
Almost all television sets sold in Europe since the early 1980s have built-in WST-standard teletext decoders as a feature. WST is used for all teletext services in Europe and Scandinavia, including Ceefax from the BBC and services from Teletext on ITV in the United Kingdom, ZDFtext from ZDF and ARDText from ARD in Germany, and Tekst-TV from NRK in Norway, among many other teletext services offered by other television networks throughout the European continent.

=== WST in the United States ===
WST saw some use in the United States in the 1980s, for the Electra service, which was carried on SuperStation WTBS (now TBS). It was also used for other teletext services on other television stations and networks in the US.

Zenith in the US also included built-in WST teletext decoders in their higher-end models of TV sets, such as their Digital System 3 line throughout the 1980s. Also, Dick Smith Electronics offered through their American distributors a WST teletext decoder in the form of a set-top box, which was sold as a kit.

This was all in competition to another teletext standard developed exclusively in North America, NABTS (North American Broadcast Teletext Standard). It was developed in Canada by Norpak, and was used by CBS for their ExtraVision service and for a very short time by NBC for their NBC Teletext service in the mid-1980s. However, NABTS never became as successful as WST in the American continent, since NABTS was a more advanced technology, which required a much more complicated and expensive decoder (even though it had improved graphics capability over WST).

== Levels ==
In the early 1980s a number of higher extension levels were envisaged for the specification, based on ideas then being promoted for worldwide videotex standards (telephone dial-up services offering a similar mix of text and graphics). The proposed higher content levels included geometrically-specified graphics (Level 4), and higher-resolution photographic-type images (Level 5), to be conveyed using the same underlying mechanism at the transport layer. No TV sets currently implement the two most sophisticated levels.

=== Level 1 (1976) ===
The initial Broadcast Teletext Specification set out by the BBC, IBA, BREMA in September 1976:

- Alpha-mosaic characters (drawn using a 2×3 block matrix) characters (similar to the graphics characters of the TRS-80 character set):

	0	1	2	3	4	5	6	7	8	9	A	B	C	D	E	F
2	NBSP	🬀	🬁	🬂	🬃	🬄	🬅	🬆	🬇	🬈	🬉	🬊	🬋	🬌	🬍	🬎
3	🬏	🬐	🬑	🬒	🬓	▌	🬔	🬕	🬖	🬗	🬘	🬙	🬚	🬛	🬜	🬝
6	🬞	🬟	🬠	🬡	🬢	🬣	🬤	🬥	🬦	🬧	▐	🬨	🬩	🬪	🬫	🬬
7	🬭	🬮	🬯	🬰	🬱	🬲	🬳	🬴	🬵	🬶	🬷	🬸	🬹	🬺	🬻	█

- spacing attributes
- fixed 8-colour palette (red, green, yellow, blue, magenta, cyan, white over a black background)
- support for double height or flash effect
- 40 columns × 24 rows character grid

(Level 1 was replaced by level 1.5)

==== Level 1.5 (1981) ====
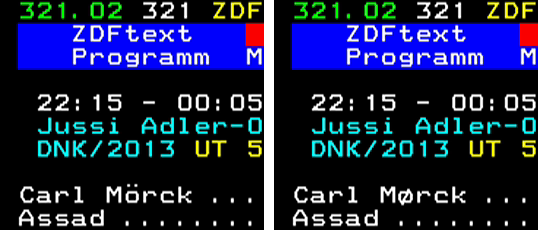
Comparison between Teletext level 1 and 1.5; note the replacement of ӧ with ø.

An extended version of level 1, with support for 13 extended character sets and other ASCII-like characters.

- Croatian, Serbian and Slovenian
- Czech and Slovak
- Danish, Swedish and Finnish
- English
- Estonian
- French
- German
- Italian
- Lettish and Lithuanian
- Polish
- Portuguese and Spanish
- Romanian
- Turkish

This is the most common system and still used by most TV channels as of 2021.

=== Level 2 (1988) ===
World System Teletext Level 2 was introduced in 1988. New features were:

- Multi-language support
- 32 colour mode.
- Non-spacing attributes
- Allows redefinable characters

(Level 2 was replaced by level 2.5)

==== Level 2.5 / Hi-Text (1995) ====
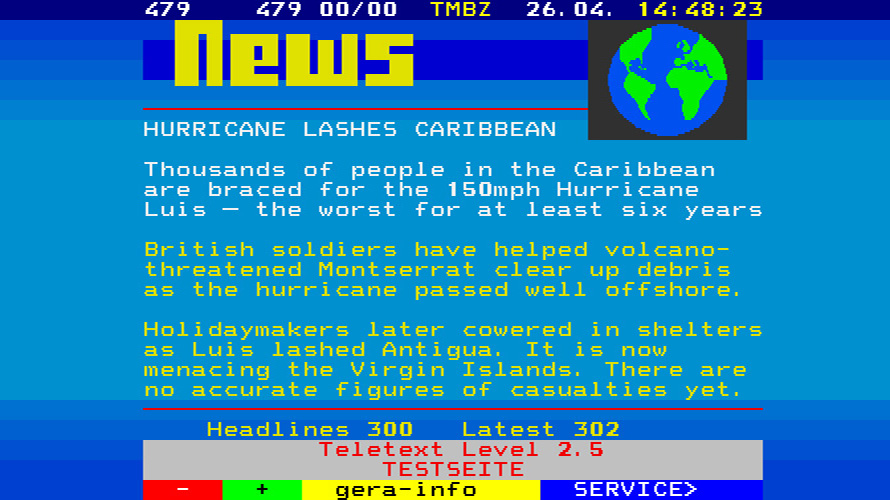
Teletext Level 2.5 test

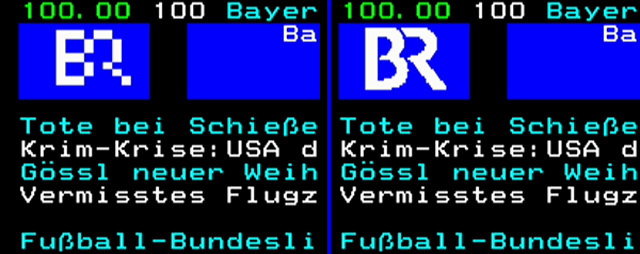
Comparison between teletext Level 1.0 and teletext Level 2.5.

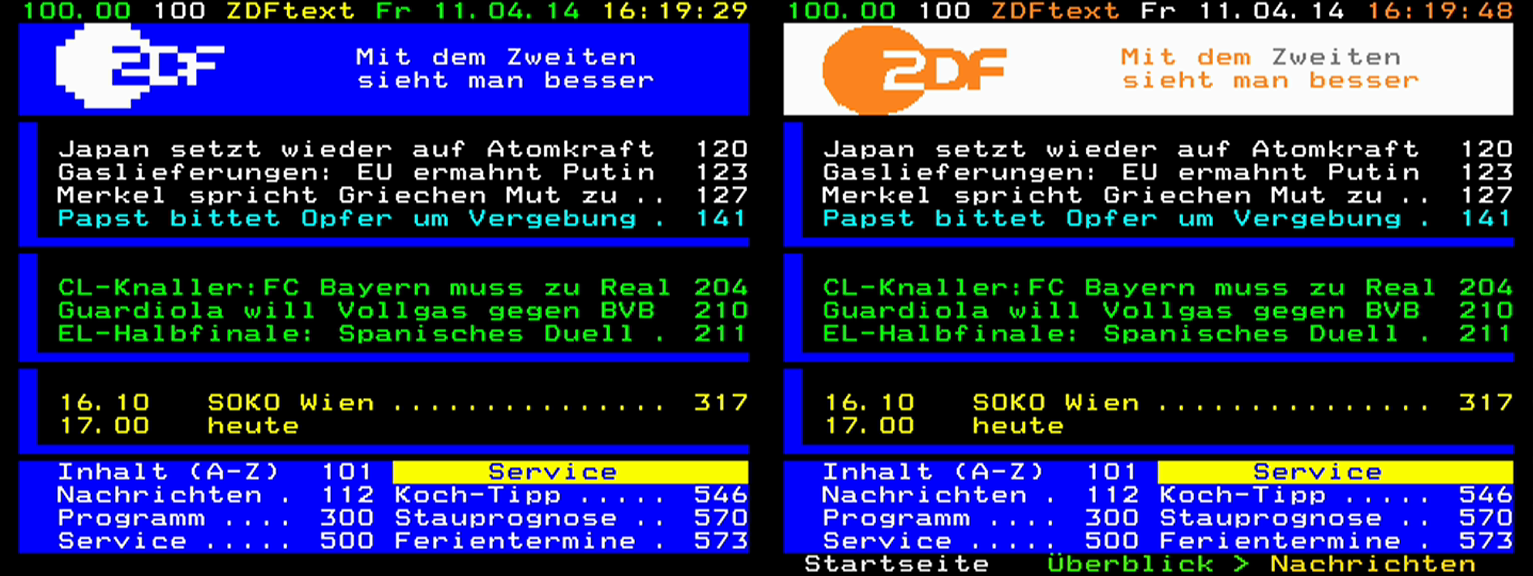
Comparison between teletext Level 1.0 and teletext Level 2.5.

Level 2.5 or HiText. was first broadcast in 1994 by the bilingual French-German channel ARTE. With Level 2.5 it is possible to set a background colour and have higher resolution text and images. The system was adopted initially by ARTE, ARD, ZDF, Bayern 3 and SwissTXT.

New features of Level 2.5 teletext:

- Multi-language support
- Non-spacing attributes
- Allows redefinable characters
- Wider colour palette with redefinable colours (4,016 colour palette)
- Provides side panels for additional text or graphics in 16:9 TVs
- nexTView EPG

The system has not been widely implemented, with only a handful of European state broadcasters supporting it.

Television stations which are known to transmit Level 2.5 teletext in the late 2010s include:

- Netherlands: public broadcaster NOS (background colour on all pages, and a test page with hi-res graphics),
- France: France 3
- Germany:
  - ZDF (some pages),
  - 3sat (some pages)
  - Bayerisches Fernsehen (and formerly also now-renamed BR-alpha) (in the past on almost all pages, now only on some pages),
  - phoenix (on some pages),
  - Bürgerfernsehen Gera (background-colour on all pages, test pages 460 to 485) and
  - SWR Fernsehen (included completely backwards-compatible Level 2.5 teletext, with higher quality text and graphics on nearly all pages).

By late 2021, SWR Fernsehen stopped using the system, but ZDF, 3sat, Bayerisches Fernsehen and Phoenix has at least some Level 2.5 enhanced pages.

One of the problems with Level 2.5 is that it often takes several transmission cycles before the higher resolution items show on the screen. In order to watch Level 2.5 teletext, a rather recent television set with a special decoder chip is required. If not, Level 1.5 text will be shown.

=== Level 3 ===
New features:

- Dynamically Redefined Character Set (DRCS) allowing the display of non-Roman characters (e.g. Arabic and Chinese)
- Pictorial graphic characters can also be defined

(Level 3 was replaced by level 3.5)

==== Level 3.5 (1997) ====
Level 3.5 extends the number of redefinable characters and their complexity and introduces different font styles and proportional spacing.

New features:

- Dynamically Redefined Character Set (DRCS) allowing the display of non-Roman characters (e.g. Arabic and Chinese)
- Pictorial graphic characters can also be defined
- Different font styles
- Proportional spacing.

=== Level 4 (1981) ===
Level 4 was proposed in 1981 and tested by IBA. No TV set implements this level.

- Vector graphics in resolutions of 320×256
- Needs computing power to generate the display from a sequence of drawing instructions
- 250,000 colours palette

=== Level 5 ===
Level 5 allows full-definition still pictures with better quality than video cameras. No TV set implements this level.

- Modulated onto a carrier
- No noise added to the picture during transmission
- Image compression used

== See also ==
- Antiope - French teletext standard (CCIR Teletext System A)
- NABTS – North American Teletext Specification (CCIR Teletext System C)
- JTES - Japanese Teletext Specification (CCIR Teletext System D)
- NAPLPS – North American Presentation Level Protocol Syntax
- Mullard SAA5050 a popular teletext decoder chip
- List of teletext services
- Teletext character set
- T.51/ISO/IEC_6937
- Text semigraphics
