= Timeline of e-commerce =

This page is a timeline of e-commerce. Major launches, milestones and other major events are included.

== Overview ==
Decade	Description
1970s–1980s	Very basic systems of electronic commerce emerge, using new technologies electronic funds transfer (EFT) and electronic data interchange (EDI), used by a relatively small number of people.
1980s–1990s	During this time period, automated teller machines and credit cards laid down the foundation for the growing world of e-commerce. The Boston Computer Exchange and Minitel become among some of the first most notable e-commerce platforms in the world.
1990s–2000s	The advent of the World Wide Web opened the door for many new e-commerce services to have a global scope. Services like Amazon.com and eBay were some of the most notable e-commerce websites to be released in this time period.
2000s–2010s	Hundreds of e-commerce services such as online food ordering, media streaming, online advertising, online marketplace, brick and mortar retailers, e-commerce payment systems and online storefronts emerge.

== Timeline ==
Year	Event Type	E-commerce Type	Description
1969	Major launch	N/A	CompuServe, the first major American e-commerce company, is founded.
1979	Invention, Milestone	N/A	Electronic shopping is invented by Michael Aldrich.
1982	Major launch, Milestone	Online marketplace	The Boston Computer Exchange, a prominent bulletin board system-based (BBS) marketplace for selling used computers, launches. This is one of the first, if not the first, ever platforms for e-commerce.
1982	Invention, Major launch	Online marketplace	Minitel, a pre-Internet Videotex online service, launches. This service could only be used in France.
1984	Major launch	Online marketplace	Electronic Mall by CompuServe, a popular online marketplace, launches. It offered pictures of products in full color.
1986	Milestone	N/A	The United States (US) National Science Foundation (NSF) limits use of the National Science Foundation Network (NSFNET) for academic purposes only.
1990	Major launch, Milestone, Invention	N/A	The first ever web browser called WorldWideWeb is released by Tim Berners-Lee. Millions who have access to the internet can now browse e-commerce platforms with greater ease.
1992	Major launch	Online marketplace	Book Stacks Unlimited, an online marketplace for selling books, launches. Initially, it launched on BBS, then moved to the internet in 1994, in the form of www.books.com.
1994	Major launch	N/A	Netscape launches Netscape Navigator, a very prominent web browser.
1994	Major launch, Milestone	N/A	Ipswitch IMail Server became the first software to be sold online and then be available for immediate download.
1994	Major launch, Milestone	Online marketplace	PizzaHut launches "PizzaNet".
1995	Milestone	N/A	The NSF lifts its ban of internet commerce on NSFNET.
1995	Major launch	Online marketplace	Amazon.com, an extremely prominent online marketplace, is launched by Jeff Bezos.
1995	Major launch	Online marketplace	eBay.com, also an extremely prominent online marketplace, launches. Initially, eBay.com was called AuctionWeb.
1996	Major launch	Online marketplace	IndiaMART, a prominent Indian online marketplace, launches.
1996	Major launch	Online marketplace	ECPlaza, a prominent Korean online marketplace, launches.
1995	Major launch	Online advertising	DoubleClick, a prominent and influential advertising launches. It was one of the first services to serve ads on the internet.
1997	Major launch	Media streaming service	Netflix, an extremely popular subscription video on demand service, launches. Netflix also offers a DVD delivery service. Netflix only began offering online video streaming in 2007.
1998	Acquisition	N/A	CompuServe is acquired by AOL.
1998	Major launch	E-commerce payment system	PayPal, a very prominent online payment system, launches.
1999	Major launch	Online marketplace	Zappos, a popular online marketplace for shoes and other apparel, launches.
1999	Invention	N/A	Amazon patents its 1-Click service, which allows users to make faster purchases.
1999	Major launch	Online marketplace	Tradera, an online marketplace similar to eBay.com in function, launches.
1999	Major launch	Online marketplace	Alibaba.com, a very prominent Chinese online marketplace, launches.
2000	Major launch	Online marketplace	StubHub, a very popular online marketplace for event tickets, launches.
2000	Major launch	Online advertising	Google launches AdWords, an advertising service that allows users to show an advertisement in Google search results that is related to the viewer's search.
2000	Major launch	Brick and mortar retailer	Walmart launches its website, allowing customers to shop online.
2001	Major launch	E-commerce payment system	Skrill (formerly known as Moneybookers.com), a prominent online payment platform, launches.
2001	Major launch	Brick and mortar retailer	Costco launches its own business-to-business online shopping system.
2001	Major launch	Online marketplace	Newegg, a very prominent online marketplace for technology, launches.
2002	Acquisition	N/A	eBay.com acquires PayPal for $1.5 billion in stocks.
2002	Major launch	Brick and mortar retailer	Safeway Inc. launches an online delivery service, allowing customers to shop online.
2003	Major launch	Online advertising	Google launches AdSense, allowing users to promote their goods on the web based on the product's relevance to the viewer of the advertisement.
2003	Major launch	Online marketplace	Valve launches Steam, the most popular Digital rights management (DRM) and gaming platform in the world.
2005	Invention	N/A	Amazon launches its Amazon Prime service, which allows users to expedite shipping on any purchases for a flat annual fee.
2006	Major launch	Online storefront service	Shopify, a prominent storefront service, launches.`
2006	Acquisition	N/A	Tradera is acquired by eBay.com for approximately $50 million.
2007	Acquisition	N/A	StubHub is acquired by eBay.com.
2007	Major launch	Media streaming service	Hulu, a popular subscription video on demand service, launches. Hulu is composed of various media organizations.
2007	Major launch	Online advertising	Facebook launches its Facebook Beacon service to display more relevant information to users by collecting data on their web browsing outside of Facebook. With this, Facebook can also promote products based on whatever is relevant.
2007	Milestone	Online marketplace	Alibaba.com became a publicly traded company on the Hong Kong Stock Exchange, raising $1.5 billion USD in its initial IPO.
2007	Major launch	Online marketplace	Flipkart, a popular Indian online marketplace, launches.
2007	Major launch	Online food ordering service	Amazon Fresh, a very prominent online food ordering service, launches in Seattle. It has since spread to dozens of cities across the US.
2008	Major launch	Online storefront service	Magento, a popular online storefront service, launches.
2008	Acquisition	N/A	Google acquires DoubleClick for $3.1 billion in cash.
2008	Acquisition	N/A	PayPal Credit (formerly known as Bill Me Later), is acquired by eBay.com.
2008	Major launch	Online marketplace	GOG.com, a prominent online gaming marketplace that offers DRM-free games, launches.
2009	Major launch	Online storefront service	BigCommerce, another popular online storefront service, launches.
2009	Acquisition	N/A	Amazon acquires Zappos.com for $1.2 billion.
2009	Major launch, Milestone	E-commerce payment system	Bitcoin, a very prominent cryptocurrency launches, and changes how consumers can pay for online purchases or even in restaurants.
2010	Major launch	Online marketplace	Groupon, a prominent online marketplace, launches.
2010	Major launch	Online marketplace	Alibaba Group launched a new domain, 1688.com, for the Chinese marketplace previously known as alibaba.com.cn.
2010	Major launch	Media streaming service	HBO Go, a popular subscription video on demand service that offers streaming of exclusively HBO content, launches.
2011	Acquisition	N/A	Magento is acquired by eBay.com.
2011	Major launch	E-commerce payment system	Google Wallet, a prominent online payment system similar to PayPal, launches.
2011	Defunction	Online advertising	Facebook Beacon is shut down due to privacy concerns.
2012	Major launch	Online food ordering service	Instacart, a popular and growing online food ordering and delivery, launches.
2013	Major launch	Online advertising	Facebook begins letting users sponsor posts, which helps give their posts or products more publicity among their friends, followers, and those to whom the post is relevant.
2013	Major launch	Online food ordering service	Google Express (formerly known as Google Shopping Express), a service similar to AmazonFresh and Instacart launches in several cities across the US, starting with San Francisco.
2013	Milestone	N/A	China becomes the largest e-commerce market in the world.
2014	Major launch, Milestone	E-commerce payment system	Apple Pay, a prominent payment system in the form of a mobile app that mimics a credit or debit card, launches.
2014	Major launch	Online marketplace	Jet.com, an online marketplace, launches.
2015	Major launch	E-commerce payment system	Google launches Android Pay, a prominent payment system similar to Apple Pay.
2014	Milestone	N/A	Singles' Day sales on Alibaba sites reach US$9.3 billion.
2015	Milestone	N/A	Cyber Monday sales set a new record of $3 billion.
2015	Major launch	Online marketplace	Pinterest enters the e-commerce scene by adding Buyable Pins, a feature that allows users to sell their pins to other users.
2015	Milestone	N/A	Singles' Day sales on Alibaba sites reach US$14.3 billion.
2016	Acquisition	N/A	Walmart announces it will be acquiring Jet.com for $3 billion.
2016	Acquisition	N/A	Alibaba announces it will be acquiring a controlling stake in Lazada Group for around US$1 billion.
2016	Milestone	N/A	Singles' Day sales on Alibaba sites reach US$17.7 billion.
2018	Acquisition	N/A	Flipkart is acquired by Walmart.

== See also ==
- Timeline of online video
- Timeline of social media
- Timeline of online advertising
