= NAPLPS =

Graphics language for videotex and teletext services

NAPLPS (North American Presentation Layer Protocol Syntax) is a graphics language for use originally with videotex and teletext services. NAPLPS was developed from the Telidon system developed in Canada, with a small number of additions from AT&T Corporation. The basics of NAPLPS were later used as the basis for several other microcomputer-based graphics systems.

== History ==
The Canadian Communications Research Centre (CRC), based in Ottawa, had been working on various graphics systems since the late 1960s, much of it led by Herb Bown. Through the 1970s they turned their attention to building out a system of "picture description instructions", which encoded graphics commands as a text stream.

Graphics were encoded as a series of instructions (graphics primitives) each represented by a single ASCII character. Graphic coordinates were encoded in multiple 6-bit strings of XY coordinate data, flagged to place them in the printable ASCII range so that they could be transmitted with conventional text transmission techniques. ASCII SI/SO characters were used to differentiate the text from graphic portions of a transmitted "page". These instructions were decoded by separate programs to produce graphics output, on a plotter for instance. Other work produced a fully interactive version. In 1975, the CRC gave a contract to Norpak to develop an interactive graphics terminal that could decode the instructions and display them on a color display.

During this period, a number of companies were developing the first teletext systems, notably the BBC's Ceefax system. Ceefax encoded character data into the lines in the vertical blanking interval of normal television signals where they could not be seen on-screen, and then used a buffer and decoder in the user's television to convert these into "pages" of text on the display. The Independent Broadcasting Authority quickly introduced their own ORACLE system, and the two organizations subsequently agreed to use a single standard, the "Broadcast Teletext Specification". This later became World System Teletext.

At about the same time, other organizations were developing videotex systems, similar to teletext except they used modems to transmit their data instead of television signals. This was potentially slower and used up a telephone line, but had the major advantage of allowing the user to transmit data back to the sender. The UK's General Post Office developed a system using the Ceefax/ORACLE standard, launching it as Prestel, while France prepared the first steps for its ultimately very successful Minitel system, using a rival display standard called Antiope.

By 1977, the Norpak system was running, and from this work the CRC decided to create their own teletext/videotext system. Unlike the systems being rolled out in Europe, the CRC decided from the start that the system should be able to run on any combination of communications links. For instance, it could use the vertical blanking interval to send data to the user, and a modem to return selections to the servers. It could be used in a one-way or two-way system.

In teletext mode, character codes were sent to users' televisions by encoding them as dot patterns in the vertical blanking interval of the video signal. Various technical "tweaks" and details of the NTSC signals used by North American televisions allowed the downstream videotex channel to increase to 600 bit/s, about twice that used in the European systems. In videotext mode, Bell 202 modems were typical, offering a 1,200 bit/s download rate. A set top box attached to the TV decoded these signals back into text and graphics pages, which the user could select among.

The system was publicly launched as Telidon on August 15, 1978. Compared to the European standards, the CRC system was faster, bi-directional, and offered real graphics as opposed to simple character graphics. The downside of the system was that it required much more advanced decoders, typically featuring Zilog Z80 or Motorola 6809 processors with RGB and/or RF output. The Innovation, Science and Economic Development Canada (then Department of Communications) launched a four-year plan to fund public roll-outs of the technology in an effort to spur the development of a commercial Telidon system.

AT&T Corporation was so impressed by Telidon that they decided to join the project. They added a number of useful extensions, notably the ability to define original graphics commands (macro) and character sets (DRCS). They also tabled algorithms for proportionally spaced text, which greatly improved the quality of the displayed pages. A joint CSA/ANSI working group (X3L2.1) revised the specifications, which were submitted for standardization. In 1983, they became CSA T500 and ANSI X3.110, or NAPLPS. The data encoding system was also standardized as the NABTS (North American Broadcast Teletext Specification) protocol.

Business models for Telidon services were poorly developed. Unlike the UK, where teletext was supported by one of only two large companies whose whole revenue model was based on a read-only medium (television), in North America Telidon was being offered by companies who worked on a subscriber basis.

== One-way systems ==
Telidon-based teletext was tested in a few North American trials in the early 1980s — CBC IRIS, TVOntario, MTS-sponsored Project IDA, to name a few.

NAPLPS was also part of the NABTS teletext standard, for the encoding and display of teletext pages.

In the late 1980s and early 1990s, affiliates of the regional sports network group SportsChannel ran a service called Sports Plus Network, which ran sports news and scores while SportsChannel was not otherwise on the air. The screens, which frequently featured team logos or likenesses of players in addition to text, were drawn entirely with NAPLPS graphics and resembled the loading of Prodigy pages over a modem, though slightly faster.

== Two-way systems ==
Various two-way systems using NAPLPS appeared in North America in the early 1980s. The biggest North American examples were Knight Ridder's Viewtron (based in Miami) and the Los Angeles Times' Gateway service (based in Orange County). Both used the Sceptre NAPLPS terminal from AT&T. The Sceptre contained a slow modem that connected over the consumer's telephone line to host computers. The Sceptre was expensive whether purchased or rented. Despite huge investments by their parent companies, neither Viewtron nor Gateway lasted into the second half of the decade. Another system, Keyfax, was developed by Keycom Electronic Publishing, a joint venture of Honeywell, Centel (since acquired by Sprint) and Field Enterprises, then-owner of the Chicago Sun-Times newspaper. Keyfax had originally been a WST teletext service, broadcast overnights on Field's Chicago television station WFLD-32 and through the VBI of both WFLD and national superstation WTBS; the decision was made to convert Keyfax into a subscription service, using a proprietary NAPLPS terminal device in a last-ditch effort to save the service. It did not work and Keyfax had ceased operations by the end of 1986.

Other early-1980s NAPLPS technology was deployed in Canada, both as a way for rural Canadians to get news and weather information and as the platform for touchscreen information kiosks. In Vancouver these were featured at Expo 86. The kiosks became ubiquitous in Toronto under the name Teleguide, and were deployed in many shopping centres and at major tourist attractions. The latter city was the North American nexus of NAPLPS and the home of Norpak, the most successful of NAPLPS-oriented developers. Norpak created and sold hardware and software for NAPLPS development and display. TVOntario also developed NAPLPS content creation software.

London, Ontario - based Cableshare used NAPLPS as the basis of touch-screen information kiosks for shopping malls, the flagship of which was deployed at Toronto's Eaton Centre. The system relied on an 8085-based microcomputer which drove several NAPLPS terminals fitted with touch screens, all communicating via Datapac to a back end database. The system offered news, weather and sports information along with shopping mall guides and coupons. Cableshare also developed and sold a leading NAPLPS page creation utility called the "Picture Painter."

In the late 1980s, Tribune Media Services (TMS) and the Associated Press operated a cable television channel called AP News Plus that provided NAPLPS-based news screens to cable television subscribers in many U.S. cities. The news pages were created and edited by TMS staffers working on an Atex editing system in Orlando, Florida, and sent by satellite to NAPLPS decoder devices located at the local cable television companies. Among the firms providing technology to TMS and the Associated Press for the AP News Plus channel was Minneapolis-based Electronic Publishers Inc. (1985–1988).

In 1981, two amateur radio operators (VE3FTT and VE3GQW) received special permission from the Canadian Department of Communications to carry out on-air experiments using NAPLPS syntax which was technically not legal at the time because it was a "coded transmission". Following their report on the success of the tests, the DOC then permitted general use of NAPLPS on amateur radioteletype. This was reported in the ARRL Radio Handbook for several years following.

Between 1988 and 1994, Bell Canada offered a dial-up Telidon service called Alex, similar in spirit to the French Minitel, with the telephone directory its principal information offering.

== Decline ==
NAPLPS lived on into the early 1990s as the graphical basis for the Prodigy online service. Some bulletin boards were able to serve NAPLPS content to callers on their 1200 and 2400 bit/s modems. But the technology's chief advantage in an era of slow telecommunication - its ability to encode complex graphics in terse object commands - became moot as data communication speeds increased and raster graphics compression became popular.

== Legacy ==
In the 1980s, the Graphical Kernel System (GKS) library, based on a 1970s specification with a similar basic geometry and command structure to NAPLPS, was widely implemented on microcomputers, and became the basis of Digital Research's GSX graphics system used in their GEM GUI. GKS was later extended into a 3D version, and additions to this resulted in PHIGS (Programmer's Hierarchical Interactive Graphics System), a competitor to OpenGL.

== See also ==
- Remote Imaging Protocol (a.k.a. RIPscrip)
- Videotex character set § Data Syntax 3
