= Dave Godfrey =

Canadian writer, professor, and publisher (1938– 2015)

Dave Godfrey (9 August 1938 – 21 June 2015) was a Canadian writer, professor, and publisher. His novel The New Ancestors won the Governor General's Award for English-language fiction in 1970.

Born in Winnipeg, Manitoba, Godfrey was educated at Trinity College at the University of Toronto, Iowa State University, and Stanford University. He taught in Ghana for several years including Adisadel College, Cape Coast from 1963 to 1965 where he was the English and music instructor. He was the founder of the Adisadel Jazz Club, which led to the creation of similar jazz and student pop groups in several Ghanaian secondary schools. He continued his teaching at the University of Toronto and the University of Victoria.

Starting in the late 1970s, he became interested in the cultural side of computer technology, and argued that decentralized data and computer communication were extremely important for art and literature. In 1979, he edited a book on the subject with Douglas Parkhill, Gutenberg two, on the social and political meaning of computer technology, and he wrote The Telidon Book with Ernest Chang, about electronic publishing and video text, and founded a software development company called Softwords, working in that field. He also worked on computer aided learning.

Godfrey was one of the founders of the House of Anansi and The New Press and was editor of Press Porcépic. He later ran a 60-acre vineyard and farm in the Cowichan Valley of British Columbia. He died of cancer on 21 June 2015, aged 76.
