= NABTS =

Protocol for encoding NAPLPS-encoded teletext pages

NABTS, the North American Broadcast Teletext Specification, is a protocol used for encoding NAPLPS-encoded teletext pages, as well as other types of digital data, within the vertical blanking interval (VBI) of an analog video signal. It is standardized under standard EIA-516, and has a rate of 15.6 kbit/s per line of video (with error correction). It was adopted into the international standard CCIR 653 (now ITU-R BT.653) of 1986 as CCIR Teletext System C.

== History ==
NABTS was originally developed as a protocol by the Canadian Department of Communications, with their industry partner Norpak, for the Telidon system. Similar systems had been developed by the BBC in Europe for their Ceefax system, and were later standardized as the World System Teletext (WST, a.k.a. CCIR Teletext System B), but differences in European and North American television standards and the greater flexibility of the Telidon standard led to the creation of a new delivery mechanism that was tuned for speed.

NABTS was the standard used for both CBS's ExtraVision and NBC's NBC Teletext services in the mid-1980s. The short-lived Time Teletext service, operated by the Time Video Information Services division of Time, Inc. and several experimental services launched by Boston's PBS station WGBH, also used NABTS. Due to teletext in general not really catching on in North America, NABTS saw a new use for the datacasting features of WebTV for Windows, under Windows 98, as well as for the now-defunct Intercast system. Canadian company Norpak sold and manufactured encoders and decoders for NABTS until the end of analog broadcasting in North America in the early 2010s; it was acquired by the Ross Video consortium in 2010. NABTS is still used in legacy analog video systems for private closed-circuit data delivery over a television broadcast or video signal.

== Description ==
In a normal NTSC video signal, there are 525 "lines" of video signal. These are split into two half-images, known as "fields", sent every 60th of a second. These images merge on-screen, and in-eye, to form a single frame of video updated every 30th of a second. Each line of each field takes 63.5 μs to send; 50.3 μs of video and 13.2 μs amount of "dead time" on each end used to signal the television that the line is complete, known as the horizontal blanking interval (HBI). When the scanning process reaches the end of the screen it returns to the top during the vertical blanking interval (VBI), which, like the HBI requires some "dead time" to properly frame the signal on the screen. In this case the dead time is represented by unused lines of the picture signal, normally the top 22 lines of the frame.

NABTS encodes data into the video signal as a series of dots at a fixed rate of 5.7272 Mbit/s. Each line of a field has 50.3 μs of video area that can be used for transmission, which results in 288 bits per line, or 36 bytes. In NABTS, three bytes are used for hardware synchronization, another three for the packet address, two for sequencing information, leaving 28 for data and redundant forward error correction (FEC) information.

In theory, the NABTS codes can be used on any of the 262 lines of the display, allowing up to 262 x 28 = 7,336 bytes of data per frame. Typically, however, the data is instead placed only in the unused lines of the vertical framing area. Lines 1–9 are used for vertical synchronization, line 21 is used for closed captioning, and everything after 22 is the television picture. That leaves 10 lines, lines 10 to 20, that are useful for sending data. At 60 fields per second, those 10 lines at 288 bits each encode a total of 172,800 bit/s, although 20% of that is needed for signaling purposes, so rates of 115,200 for end-user data are more typical. Applications requiring less throughput can simply use fewer lines.

== Services using NABTS ==
- Telidon – videotex/teletext service developed by the Canadian Communications Research Centre (CRC)
- ExtraVision – teletext service created and operated by CBS
- NBC Teletext – teletext service provided by NBC
- Time Teletext – operated by the Time Video Information Services division of Time, Inc.

== See also ==
- Antiope – French teletext standard (CCIR Teletext System A)
- World System Teletext – European Teletext Specification (CCIR Teletext System B)
- JTES – Japanese Teletext Specification (CCIR Teletext System D)
- NAPLPS – North American Presentation Level Protocol Syntax
- Teletext character set
- Text semigraphics
