= ExtraVision =

American teletext service

- ExtraVision index page, 1984
- Developer: CBS
- Type: Teletext
- Launched: 1983
- Discontinued: 1988
- Platform: NABTS
- Status: Discontinued

ExtraVision was a teletext service created and operated by the American television network CBS in the early to mid-1980s. It was carried in the vertical blanking interval of the video from local affiliate stations of the CBS network. It featured CBS program information, news, sports, weather, even subtitling for CBS programming (much like page 888 in British-based World System Teletext, and American line 21 closed-captioning). ExtraVision could also have its pages customized by the local affiliate station carrying it, for such things as program schedules, local community announcements, and station promotions. WGBH Boston, a pioneer in assisting the deaf and hard-of-hearing with closed captioning, also provided content for those audiences to ExtraVision and assisted in providing captioning for CBS programming via ExtraVision.

CBS had begun tests in 1979 at their St. Louis station KMOX-TV (currently KMOV) using the French Antiope system, and again in 1981 in the Los Angeles area on KNXT (currently KCBS), in a joint test with PBS station KCET. The full ExtraVision service began in April 1983 on CBS affiliate WBTV in Charlotte, NC, and went nationwide in 1984.

One issue was that, due to CBS' heavy emphasis on the ExtraVision service, it did not offer line 21 closed-captioning for the hearing impaired, unlike ABC, NBC or PBS (ABC never offered teletext services, while only certain PBS stations, including the aforementioned KCET and WGBH, experimented with teletext). Some believed that CBS' opposition to line-21 services was so large, they even wanted to strip captioning from commercials to be run during programming. The result was nationwide protests against CBS by the National Association of the Deaf, with people picketing the studios of CBS and affiliate stations; one child protested in Grand Rapids, MI with a sign reading "Please caption for my Mom and Dad".

The situation was further compounded in August 1982, when NBC ceased to offer closed-captioning due to decreased demand. While the NAD's Phil Bravin, chairman of the NAD's newly-formed TV Access Committee, was able to persuade NBC to resume captioning, he continued to meet with resistance by CBS; after an unproductive meeting with then-head of CBS affiliate relations, Tony Malara, Bravin promised to "see you on the streets of America". CBS ultimately relented in March 1984, promising three hours of closed-captioned programming starting that fall.

Due to the service using the NABTS protocol, which required a quite expensive decoder to receive the service, and the FCC not choosing to require TV manufacturers to integrate teletext into their sets or choose between either NABTS or the BBC and IBA's World System Teletext (used by Electra and several other services), ExtraVision eventually began to experience cutbacks, with several staffers laid off in May 1986; the production of news content was outsourced to AP/TMS Media Services (a joint venture between the Associated Press and the Tribune Company). Also, most of the local CBS affiliates carrying the ExtraVision service did not bother to invest in the computer equipment required to customize pages to carry locally oriented information on the service; only WBTV, WIVB-TV in Buffalo, and then-CBS affiliate KSL-TV in Salt Lake City (which had been independently testing and using teletext beginning in 1978, and continued into the early 1990s) provided localized information.

ExtraVision was discontinued in 1988, three years after NBC Teletext had also been abandoned by NBC.
