= Boston Computer Exchange =

The Boston Computer Exchange was the world's first e-commerce company, and dominated electronic trading in used computers in the US in the 1980s. Also called the BCE and BoCoEx, it was in operation before the internet became widely available to the general public. Its Bulletin Board System based marketplace utilized Delphi as a platform for an on-line database of products where buyers and sellers bought, sold and traded computers. The company pioneered efforts to create a fully automated, on-line auction and trade systems for general commerce and eventually turned into an Internet-based business.

== Origins ==
Boston Computer Exchange was founded in 1982 as a marketplace for people who wanted to sell their used computers. Initially it was a paper database but quickly moved into a computerized database using Alpha 2 database manager on a dual floppy IBM Personal Computer. Nascent bulletin board systems were just being developed and the founders struck a mutual agreement with the owners of the Delphi bulletin board system to post the database on their public access system. The first database upload was on March 4, 1983. Fresh data was posted every day from that day until the business closed in the 1990s. The database was also posted as a searchable database on YellowData, and then Boston CitiNet. Later, when CompuServe opened their Electronic Mall in 1989, Boston Computer Exchange had the first store on that mall, too.

== Founders ==
The founders of the Boston Computer Exchange were Alexander Randall 5th and Cameron Hall. Randall held a PhD in General Systems research or Systems Theory and Hall had degrees in Economics. They fused their interest in creating a computerized marketplace for trade. The husband and wife started the business on the dining room table and worked together on it steadily for the next 10 years. Hall and Randall had previously owned several small entrepreneurial ventures. Randall was the Godson of J. Presper Eckert and had been involved with computers from childhood. Hall's father had been involved with modems from the earliest days of datacomm - so each brought special skills to the project.

== Early designs of automated trading ==
Like later Internet based e-commerce systems such as eBay, sellers uploaded inventory to a database, buyers browsed inventory online but in this pre-Internet era, they consummated transactions by telephone. Buyers then paid Sellers, Sellers shipped goods to Buyers and the Exchange billed the seller a commission. After several years of operations and some bad transactions, the Exchange invented an escrow services to protect buyers, sellers and the Exchange itself. The absence of a verifiable way to close credit card transactions on-line prevented an "all on-line" trade system.

In 1986, the Exchange created an electronic trading system that was showcased at the COMDEX Trade Show in Las Vegas which attracting wide attention to their vision of an all-electronic, all "on-line" system for buying and selling all types of equipment. The BCENE auction trading system pre-dated all other efforts to create on-line trade and was widely viewed as a major innovation in how commerce would be conducted in all business areas. Standard Oil brought BoCoEx under contract and secured all rights to the system seeking advice on how to create a world-scale on-line trading system. Standard Oil pursued this for several years until that oil company was sold to BP and the idea was shelved but not scrapped. Standard Oil tried to sell the idea and the BoCoEx contracts to other companies and eventually abandoned the effort and released Randall and Hall from their exclusive consulting contracts.

== BoCoEx Index ==
On advice from futurist Wes Thomas, the Boston Computer Exchange created a weekly price report - called the BoCoEx Index, a report on the High, Low and Closing Price on the Exchange for the most popular computer models. Starting in 1983, this price list became a standard tool for assessing the value of computers in court cases, after market sales and in valuations of assets in corporate mergers and acquisitions. The report was published every week in Computerworld and PCWeek magazines. The report dominated the used computer after market and was a standard news item in other computer magazines, much like stock prices in a daily newspaper. The BoCoEx Index was also a regular feature on the Business Radio Network and was used to create a ten-year report on the price declines of popular computer models.

== Seat on the Exchange ==
The founders sought to create trading partners to trade on the exchange and they wrote a book of instructions called a "Seat on the Exchange." It was first offered in 1986 and expanded in several subsequent editions. The book was a set of tools for creating a free standing computer trading enterprise in any city. At the peak there were 150 "Computer Exchanges" that had licensed technology from Boston Computer Exchange. Among them were the Southern Computer Exchange, The NaComEx, and "seats" in such places as San Francisco, Virginia, Maryland, Los Angeles, New Jersey, New York, and as far afield as Santiago Chile, Stockholm and Leningrad in Russia. The "Seat" book detailed the operations of the business and provided access to a national database operating on a private server.

Randall also authored the "Used Computer Handbook" for Microsoft Press in 1990 which detailed how to safely buy and sell computers in the after market. NY Times article on BCE and Seat Book

== Decomposition and demise ==
On Jan 1, 1990, Randall and Hall sold the Exchange to ValCom - a computer retailer - and that business did not choose to vigorously pursue the on-line aspects of the Boston Computer Exchange - rather they focused on using the Exchange to sell excess inventory from the ValCom Stores. Nevertheless, the Exchange did create an "All Auctions" system in the early 1990s. The whole enterprise was later sold to Compaq Corporation and subsequently to Hewlett-Packard. The Boston Computer Exchange eventually ceased to operate and was closed.

Hall died of cancer in 1998. Randall is presently professor of communication at the University of the Virgin Islands.
