= Sports Plus Network =

Sports Plus Network was a service run by SportsChannel in 1988-1993 that filled the airtime when SportsChannel was not on the air. It was an "automated" service that featured sports news and scores displayed using NAPLPS graphics.

The service appears to have had some similarity to teletext, but the major difference was that it was not interactive, stories stay on screen for a few seconds and it moves to the next screen.

According to the ticker that scrolled at the bottom of the screen, the service was a joint venture by SportsChannel, Tribune Media Services, and the Associated Press.

In early 1991, the graphics used were updated.

== In popular culture ==
The channel could sometimes be seen on a monitor in the newsroom on the set of Murphy Brown.
