= Douglas Parkhill =

Douglas F. Parkhill is a Canadian technologist and former research minister, best known for his pioneering work on what is now called cloud computing, and his work on Canada's Telidon videotex project.

He started working at the Canadian ministry of Communications (now part of the Department of Trade and Industry) in 1969, having previously worked at the Mitre Corporation. He was responsible for many activities in communications satellites, computer communications, command and control systems and telecommunications. He was winner of the Treasury Board of Canada Secretariat's Outstanding Achievement award in 1982, the Conestoga shield for services to government and industry in computer communications research and development, the Touche Ross award for Telidon development. He received the honorary degrees of Doctor of Engineering and Doctor of the University from the University of Ottawa in 1971.

He was an author of several publications including the 1966 book, The Challenge of the Computer Utility. In the book, Parkhill thoroughly explored many of the modern-day characteristics of cloud computing (elastic provisioning through a utility service) as well as the comparison to the electricity industry and the use of public, private, government and community forms. The book won the McKinsey Foundation award for distinguished contributions to management literature.

He worked with Dave Godfrey, the Canadian writer and novelist on a later book Gutenberg two about the social and political meaning of computer technology.

He was in charge of research at the Federal Department of Communications at the time when the department was funding development of the Telidon videotext system, was heavily involved in promoting the system, and had overall control of the program. In a radio broadcast in 1980, he outlined some of the potential of the system, from financial information, to theatre reservations, with the ability to pay and print out tickets from the system. He later documented the history of the Telidon project, and the history of videotext in general.

== Publications ==
- The Challenge of the Computer Utility, Addison-Wesley, 1966, ISBN 0-201-05720-4
- edited with Dave Godfrey, Gutenberg Two: The New Electronics and Social Change, Press Porcepic, 1979, ISBN 0-88878-191-1
- The Beginning of a Beginning. Ottawa; Department of Communications, 1987. A history of the Telidon project.
