= Bell MTS =

Canadian telecommunications company

Bell MTS Inc.
- Formerly: Manitoba Government Telephones (1908–1921); Manitoba Telephone System (1921–2004); Manitoba Telecom Services (2004–2017)
- Type: Crown corporation (1908–1997); Private (1997–2017); Subsidiary (since 2017)
- Industry: Telecommunications
- Founded: July 1908; 118 years ago
- Headquarters: Winnipeg, Manitoba, Canada
- Area served: Manitoba, Canada
- Key people: Paul Norris (vice chair)
- Parent: BCE (2017–present)
- Website: bellmts.ca

Bell MTS Inc. (formerly Manitoba Telecom Services) is a subsidiary of BCE Inc. that operates telecommunications services in Manitoba.

Originally established as Manitoba Government Telephones after the Government of Manitoba purchased the Manitoba assets of Bell Canada, the corporation was privatized in 1996. On March 17, 2017, Bell regained control of MTS after the Bell Canada group's holding company BCE Inc. closed its $3.9 billion acquisition of the provider and, for regulatory reasons, Bell divested approximately one third of MTS's wireless business (including subscribers and retail outlets) to Telus, and a smaller portion to the new entrant Xplornet. Under Bell ownership, Bell MTS will serve as the headquarters of Bell's telecom businesses in western Canada.

== History ==
=== Beginning ===
One of the first two telephone subscribers in Manitoba was Winnipeg businessman James Henry Ashdown in 1881.

=== Early 20th century ===
MTS is the descendant company of Manitoba Government Telephones, which went into operation in January 1908 after the government of Manitoba bought Bell Canada's Manitoba operations. The Crown corporation became Manitoba Telephone System in 1921, and eventually took over all private telephone operations in the province.

=== 1940s ===
MTS announced in late 1947 that it would modernize its long-distance equipment in both Winnipeg and Brandon, using Siemens Brothers switching equipment, to better handle routing of automatic dialing of long-distance calls by telephone operators using the currently known Area Code system. To accomplish this, MTS needed to expand its Corydon Ave. long-distance switching centre by adding four additional storeys to the building. Initial communities to be set up with the new long-distance hardware included Boissevain, Deloraine, Dauphin, Kenton, Melita, Waskada, Lyleton, Tilston, Portage la Prairie, Pierson.

A trial of Mobile radio-telephone service, a technology that was developed by AT&T, took place early in 1948. An earlier trial of wireless telephone service was conducted in northern Manitoba mining towns.

=== 1950s ===
At midnight on June 21, 1959, Winnipeg was the first urban area in North America to implement the 9-9-9 emergency telephone number.

Also in the late 1950s, MTS located one of its administrative offices on Empress St. near the newly opened Polo Park Shopping Centre complex. In 2000 these employees were moved to 333 Main St., commonly known as MTS Place, where 1,500 employees now work. This formed part of the Province's Downtown First strategy.

=== 1970s ===
In the late 1970s, similar to policy changes implemented by AT&T in the U.S., MTS allowed its customers to purchase their own telephone equipment and with this, provided free installation of RJ11 telephone jacks.

In July 1979, MTS announced that it would be a pioneer in Telidon-based two-way electronic information services. The trial was called "Project IDA" and ran from 1980 to 1981.

=== 1980s ===
MTS was a pioneer in offering videotex at the commercial level. In 1981, it partnered with Infomart (then owned by the Torstar and Southam newspaper chains) to create the Grassroots service, providing information relevant to farmers on the Canadian prairies. Customers paid $47.50 per month to subscribe to Grassroots, plus connection fees to DATAPAC. Terminal equipment was manufactured by Norpak.

They opened MTS Phone Centre stores in shopping malls to sell residential and business phones and services, and in 1984 opened two MTS Business Centre locations (Commodity Exchange Tower lobby and Empress St. office) to provide sales of business-level equipment.

In the mid-1980s, MTS started a subsidiary known as MTX, which had invested in telecommunications in Saudi Arabia. However MTX was forced to shut down after controversy about the company back in Manitoba after MTX lost $27 million on the venture.

In the late 1980s MTS launched MTS Mobility providing cellular and paging services in Manitoba after competitor Cantel was allowed to set up the cellular radio infrastructure and market the service before MTS.

=== 1990s ===
In 1996, the Provincial government of Premier Gary Filmon decided to sell the Manitoba Telephone System to private shareholders. The decision to privatize was seen as controversial, as it marked a significant departure from the Progressive Conservatives' earlier position that MTS should remain provincially owned.

In January 1999, MTS partnered with Bell Canada to form Intrigna, a Competitive Local Exchange Carrier (CLEC) which was created to expand telecommunications options for the business market in Alberta and British Columbia. As part of the deal, Bell Canada gained 20% ownership of MTS. They set up a jointly operated office in Calgary. By the summer of 1999, fibre optic cable had been laid in Edmonton and Calgary, and later extended to Vancouver, British Columbia.

In August 1999, MTS completed work on a new trunked (digital) radio system known as FleetNet 800, technology licensed from neighbouring SaskTel.

In the Fall of 1999, MTS began to offer DSL high-speed Internet service in Winnipeg and Brandon, which later expanded to other areas of the province.

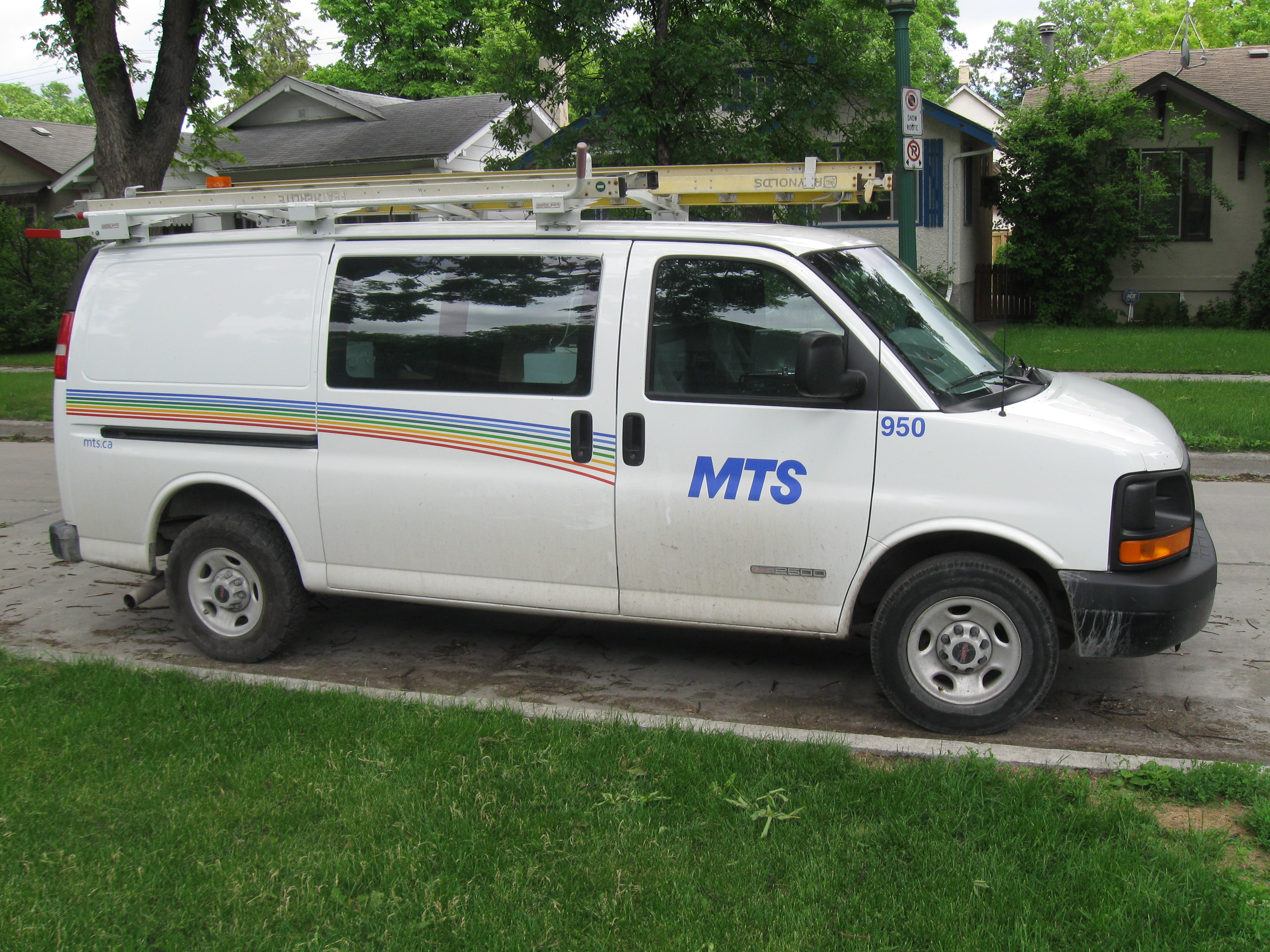
MTS Technician van in Winnipeg

=== 2000s ===
The CRTC met with the various telecommunications providers in Canada and required of them to implement a Service Improvement Plan (SIP). This meant that MTS had to improve service to northern remote areas that even by the 21st century had poor quality phone service. Customers in northern Manitoba complained that the microwave system could not handle data communications (modem, fax) well. This, as well as the collapse of a microwave relay tower linking Churchill in early January 2000, led MTS to initiate upgrades to the Radisson-Churchill corridor with fibre optics and the Lynn Lake-Thompson corridor with a digital microwave system to replace the outdated equipment. Cellular telephone service is currently available to 98% of the population in the province.

In 2003, MTS purchased the naming rights for the True North Centre in downtown Winnipeg, renaming it the MTS Centre. The 10-year deal between True North Sports & Entertainment and MTS, which was MTS's single largest advertising expenditure, was extended when the arena became a National Hockey League venue in 2011.

In February 2004, MTS sold its 40% stake in Intrigna to Bell Canada for $230 million.

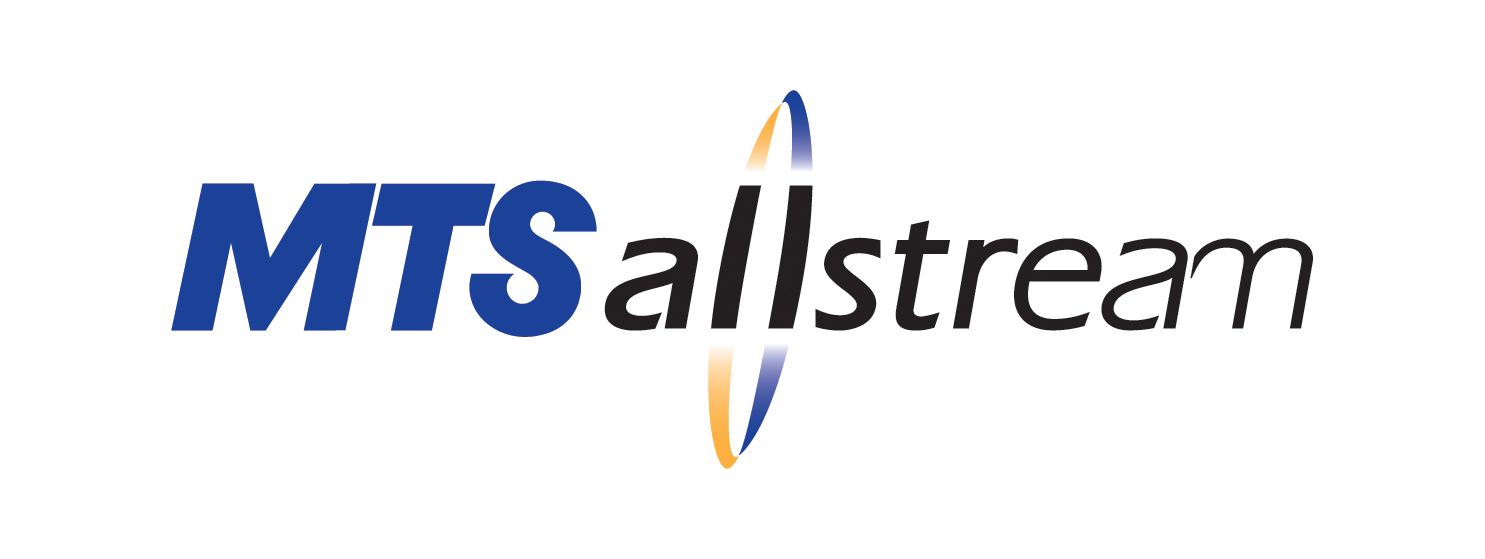
MTSAllstream Logo 2004

In April 2004, MTS acquired Allstream, the successor to the transcontinental railways' telegraph businesses. It renamed the main subsidiary to MTS Allstream Inc. until 2012, when it was split as MTS Inc. and Allstream Inc.

On December 7, 2005, former BCE executive Pierre Blouin was named chief executive officer of Manitoba Telecom Services and of MTS Allstream, replacing longtime CEO Bill Fraser.

=== 2010s ===
Manitoba Telecom Services logo used until BCE acquisition in 2017.

In March 2011, MTS unveiled a new, animated version of their mascot, Morty the Bison. On March 31, 2011 MTS officially launched a HSPA+ wireless network along with the availability Apple's iPhone series of smartphones starting with the iPhone 4. The wireless network had claims it would provide data speeds up to 21 Mbit/s. In September 2012, MTS launched LTE, with it initially rolling out in the cities of Winnipeg and Brandon.

MTS' older CDMA network continues to work with CDMA handsets. According to the MTS website, MTS plans on shutting down its CDMA service by the end of 2016.

In May 2013, Allstream was to be sold to Accelero Capital, with the deal expected to close by the end of the year. However, on October 7, 2013, the Canadian government blocked the sale over national security concerns, declining to mention the specific concerns.

In November 2014, Jay A. Forbes was appointed as CEO effective January 1, 2015.

On November 23, 2015 it was announced that Allstream Inc. would be sold to Zayo Group in a cash transaction deal worth $465 million.

==== Acquisition by Bell ====
On May 2, 2016, BCE Inc. announced that it would acquire MTS in a $3.9 billion all-stock deal, paying $40 per share and assuming $800 million in debt. Following the closure of this purchase pending regulatory approval, the company will operate as Bell MTS, a subsidiary of Bell Canada; the acquisition was expected to be closed in late 2016 to early 2017. Bell committed to investing $1 billion over five years into expanding broadband service in Manitoba, and upgrading MTS's infrastructure to support new services, including Bell Fibe and LTE-Advanced. Bell will also base its Western Canadian operations out of Bell MTS in Winnipeg, increasing its staff to 6,900 employees. As a condition of the sale, Bell agreed to divest one-third of MTS Mobility's wireless subscribers and MTS retail locations to Telus; the divestment aimed to give the three national carriers (Bell, Rogers, and Telus) a roughly equal market share in Manitoba.

The deal faced criticism for the possibility that it would result in a higher cost of services. Due to the market positioning of MTS as a fourth major wireless carrier in the region, the three major national carriers have historically offered lower prices in Manitoba to remain competitive. As such, with the removal of a competitor, there would no longer be an incentive to do so. A similar business climate exists in Saskatchewan, where the three national carriers must compete against the dominant, government-owned regional carrier SaskTel. A survey by the Angus Reid Institute found that 61% of those surveyed moderately or strongly disapproved of the deal.

On December 20, 2016, the CRTC approved the sale of MTS's broadcast distribution undertakings to Bell. On February 15, 2017, the deal was approved by the Competition Bureau and Innovation, Science and Economic Development Canada. To relieve concerns over the reduction of wireless competition in Manitoba post-merger, Bell additionally agreed to divest 24,700 customers, 6 retail locations, and wireless spectrum to rural internet provider Xplornet so it may launch its own competing wireless business. Bell will provide Xplornet with "expedited access" to its towers for five years, as well as roaming and handset stock. This aspect of the deal will maintain the presence of four competing wireless providers in Manitoba, with the fourth being a new entrant to the market.

The acquisition closed on March 17, 2017; at this time, Dan McKeen (who led the integration of Bell Aliant into the company's national operations) was installed as the new head of the division, replacing the outgoing Jay Forbes. Along with the closure of the deal, Bell launched LTE service in Churchill, Manitoba. Bell stated that it intended to maintain MTS's existing wireless pricing structure for at least a year after the closure of the acquisition. Rates for all other Bell MTS services were raised in September 2017. The MTS Centre was renamed to Bell MTS Place on May 30, 2017, following Bell Canada’s acquisition of MTS.

In October 2018, Bell MTS began to integrate its wireless subscribers into the national Bell Mobility business.

In late August 2019, Bell MTS announced that it will no longer serve some rural communities with wireless Internet service via the "rural Internet program" because of a decrease in wholesale fees mandated by the CRTC.

On June 15, 2021, following the expiration of Bell MTS’ naming rights, True North Sports & Entertainment, the operator of Bell MTS Place, announced that the naming rights to the arena had been sold to Canada Life under a 10-year agreement.

== Facilities ==
The administration offices are located at 333 Main St. in Winnipeg, in the former Bank of Montreal Building. The complex is now known as MTS Place.

The MTS Long Distance Gateway is located in the J. F. Mills Building on Corydon Avenue near what is locally known as Confusion Corner. One of its functions is to transmit local television signals from Winnipeg to retransmitters throughout the province. However, since 2011 MTS no longer transmits CBC television and Radio-Canada television signals by satellite and since it no longer performs this function for CTV as satellites and fibre-optic technologies have been replaced. Bell MTS is the former naming rights holder of a venue in Winnipeg, the Bell MTS Iceplex.

== Services ==
=== Fibe TV ===
Bell MTS operates an IPTV service, Bell MTS Fibe TV (formerly MTS Ultimate TV), which is available in Brandon, Carberry, Dauphin, Killarney, Minnedosa, Neepawa, Oakbank, Portage la Prairie, Selkirk, Steinbach, The Pas, Thompson, and Winnipeg. The service launched in 2009 and is based on Ericsson Mediaroom middleware. MTS Classic TV was the company's legacy digital television service; it was discontinued in 2015 due to its incompatibility with Alert Ready. The service was updated and rebranded as Fibe TV in November 2017 (unifying it with the Fibe TV-branded services it offers in the Atlantic and Ontario), adding new features such as "Restart".

=== Cable TV ===
Bell MTS also offers cable television service in Winnipeg, Carman, Holland, Manitou, Miami, Morris, Notre Dame de Lourdes, Plum Coulee, St. Claude, St. Jean Baptiste, Treherne, Altona, Brandon, Morden, and Winkler.

== See also ==
- Bell Aliant, a similar subsidiary in Atlantic Canada
- Fibe (Bell Aliant)
