= NexTView =

NexTView was an electronic program guide for the analog domain, introduced in 1995 and based on Teletext Level 2.5 / Hi-Text.

It was used by TV programme listings for all of the major networks in Germany, Austria, France and Switzerland. The transmission protocol was based on teletext, however, using a compact binary format instead of preformatted text pages. The advantage compared to paper-based TV magazines was that the user had an immediate overview of the current and next programmes, and was able to search through the programme database, filtering results by categories.

The nxtvepg software enabled nexTView to be viewed using a personal computer.

Some TV manufacturers that implemented this solution were: Grundig, Loewe, Metz, Philips, Sony, Thomson, and Quelle Universum.

From 1997 to October 2013, NexTView was broadcast on Swiss Television channels and on French-language channels whose teletext services were managed from Swiss Television (SwissText) (TV5, M6, Canal+).

== See also ==
- Guide Plus
- AV.link
