= Stellar Conquest (video game) =

1990 video game

- Publisher(s): Delphi Telecommunications Network
- Release: 1990

Stellar Conquest is a 1990 video game published by Delphi Telecommunications Network.

== Gameplay ==
Stellar Conquest is a game in which players try to conquer the galaxy in an online multiplayer format. Players working in teams can explore and capture planets, battle other ships, and earn points to increase their ranks.

== Reception ==
David M. Wilson reviewed the game for Computer Gaming World, and stated that "While not perfect, Stellar Conquest definitely has something going for it. It could even become "addictive," if some effort were spent in fixing some of the problems. Some suggested improvements would include: the ability to create a new starbase after having the team's original one blown up; being able to communicate with a named player; and giving the teamless player more power. Even so, Stellar Conquest is worth playing now and could get even better."
