= Timeline of online advertising =

This page is a timeline of online advertising. Major launches, milestones and other major events are included.

== Overview ==
Decade	Description
Late 1970s– 1980s	Much of online advertising during this time period is done through Email, in the form of spamming. Such activities have continued to this day, but became much more common after the ban against the commercial use of the internet was lifted in 1991.
1990s– 2000s	With people now having their own websites, banner ads are used as a source of income to pay for these websites and as side money. Companies like Prodigy, Global Network Navigator (GNN), and HotWired are pioneers in the business of online advertising.
2000s– 2010s	As more companies capable of providing advertising services emerge, several major successful companies such as Google, Facebook, Yahoo!, Microsoft, and AOL begin to dominate the market.

== Timeline ==
Year	Month and date	Event type	Advertisement type	Description
1978	May 3	Milestone	Email marketing	The first instance of email spam is sent, the purpose of which is advertising.
1980		Launch	N/A	Usenet, a popular discussion forum, launches, and is occasionally overwhelmed with advertising spam posts.
1984		Launch	Banner advertising	Prodigy launches, offering one of the first online advertising services; although these ads are always in the same spot on the screen, and are non-clickable.
1991	March	Milestone	N/A	The ban on commercial use on the NSFNET is lifted by the National Science Foundation (NSF).
1992	July	Milestone	Sponsorship	The online newsletter TidBITS launches a sponsorship program in which companies paid to provide information via an email auto-responder to pre-Web users.
1993		Launch	Banner advertising	GNN, one of the first web publication and web advertising services, is launched by O'Reilly Media.
1994		Milestone	Banner advertising	The first ever clickable advertisement is sold to a Silicon Valley law firm by GNN.
1994		Launch	N/A	HotWired, the first commercial web magazine, launches.
1994	October 27	Milestone	Banner advertising	The first ever banner is sold to AT&T, and is visible on the first issue of HotWired.
1995	May	Acquisition	Banner advertising	GNN is acquired by AOL for $11 million.
1996		Launch	Ad serving	DoubleClick, an online advertising company, launches.
1996	July	Launch, Milestone	Search advertising	Yahoo! launches the very first search ads in their search engine.
1997		Invention	Pop-up ads	Pop-up ads are invented by Ethan Zuckerman, and considered to be a more aggressive and disliked advertising strategy.
1998	September 4	Launch	N/A	Google, an online search engine, launches.
1998		Invention, Launch, Milestone	Ad exchange	OpenX, one of the first ad exchanges, launches as an open source project.
1998		Launch	Search advertising	GoTo (now Yahoo! Search Marketing), a search engine which offers search advertising, launches.
1999		Defunction	N/A	HotWired is shut down after its domain is re-purposed by Lycos.
2000	October 23	Launch	Search advertising	Google launches the AdWords service, which allows for advertising based on a user's browsing habits and their search keywords.
2002		Invention, milestone	Pop-up ads	With the annoyance brought about by pop-up ads, many web browsers such as Firefox, Netscape, and Opera begin to roll out features to block these ads.
2003	October 7	Acquisition	Search advertising	Overture (formerly GoTo) is acquired by Yahoo! to enrich their search engine.
2004	February	Launch	Social media advertising	Facebook, the most popular social media network, launches.
2005	February 14	Launch	Banner advertising	YouTube, a popular video sharing website, launches.
2005		Launch	Demand-side platform	Criteo, one of the first demand-side platforms, launches.
2006	October	Acquisition	N/A	YouTube is acquired by Google for $1.65 billion.
2006		Invention, launch, milestone	Ad blocking	Adblock, an ad-blocking add-on for web browsers, is released.
2006		Launch	Content discovery platform	Outbrain, an advertising company that powers external recirculation widgets, launches.
2006	August	Launch	Native advertising	YouTube launches its video advertising platform, which has a giant reach today.
2007		Launch	Content discovery platform	Taboola, an advertising company that powers external recirculation widgets, launches.
2007		Launch	Behavioral targeting, social media advertising	Facebook launches Beacon, an intricate advertising platform that tracks Facebook users' activities on websites outside of Facebook.
2007	April 14	Acquisition	Ad serving	Google acquires DoubleClick, an advertising platform, for $3.1 billion.
2007	May 18	Acquisition	Ad serving	Microsoft acquires AQuantive, an advertising platform, for $6.5 billion.
2007		Launch	Demand-side platform	MediaMath, a demand-side platform, launches.
2008	March	Launch	Demand-side platform	Rocket Fuel Inc., a demand-side platform, launches.
2008	December	Invention/patent	Viewable impression	RealVu Inc.invents viewable impression
2008		Launch	Ad blocking	Rick Petnel creates Easylist, one of the most popular filter lists available for ad-blocking web browser add-ons. The filter list Easylist Privacy is also available, and focuses on the blocking of web elements that may invade a user's privacy.
2009	September 18	Launch	Ad exchange	Google launches its own ad exchange platform with DoubleClick.
2009	September	Launch	MRC viewable impression accreditation	RealVu introduces the viewable impression invention to the MRC
2010	February 22	Launch	Ad serving	Google launches DoubleClick for Publishers (DFP), an advertising software as a service.
2010	April 12	Launch	Social media advertising	Twitter launches Promoted Tweets, which allows advertisers to pay for tweets to be shown in a user's feed.
2013	April 26	Acquisition	Ad serving	Facebook acquires Atlas Solutions from Microsoft for $100 million, in order to enrich its already bustling advertising platform.
2013	October	Launch	Social media advertising	Instagram, a popular image sharing platform, releases its feature of having sponsored posts appear on user's feeds.
2014	March 24	Launch	Social media advertising	Pinterest, a creative image sharing platform, launches its Promoted Pins service which allows for additional advertising in a user's feed.
2014	June 23	Launch	Ad blocking	UBlock Origin, an ad-blocking extension for web browsers, launches.
2014	November 14	Launch*	Ad serving	Facebook re-launches Atlas.
2016	June 14	Launch	Social media advertising	Snapchat, a popular messaging app, begins to include advertisements between user's "stories".
2016	August	Major event	Ad blocking	Facebook states that they will start blocking the use of ad blocking extensions, specifically Adblock Plus and Adblock. In response to this, these ad-blockers begin to block Facebook's blocking in a back-and-forth "war".

(*) Such launches are not initial launches, but rather re-launches.

== See also ==
- Timeline of e-commerce
- Online advertising
