= TRS-80 character set =

8-bit character set

The TRS-80 computer manufactured by Tandy / Radio Shack contains an 8-bit character set. It is partially derived from ASCII, and shares the code points from 32 - 95 on the standard model. Code points 96 - 127 are supported on models that have been fitted with a lower-case upgrade.

The character set consists of letters, various numeric and special characters as well as 64 semigraphics called squots (square dots) from a 2×3 matrix. These were located at code points 128 to 191 with bits 5-0 following their binary representation, similar to alpha-mosaic characters in World System Teletext. These characters were used for graphics in games, such as Android Nim.

== Character set ==
The following table shows the TRS-80 model I character set. Each character is shown with a potential Unicode equivalent. Space and control characters are represented by the abbreviations for their names.

TRS-80 model I character set
	0	1	2	3	4	5	6	7	8	9	A	B	C	D	E	F
0x									BS (Note: Backspace and erase current character)		LF			CR	con (Note: Cursor on)	coff (Note: Cursor off)
1x							カ (Note: Toggles Katakana characters (Model III))	32 (Note: Converts to wide 32 column mode)	← (Note: Backspace ← Cursor)	→ (Note: Advance → Cursor)	↓ (Note: Downward ↓ linefeed)	↑ (Note: Upward ↑ linefeed)	home (Note: Move cursor to (0,0), also turns off 32 column mode)	sol (Note: Move to start of line)	ceol (Note: Erase to end of line)	ceof (Note: Erase to end of frame)
2x	SP	!	"	#	$	%	&	'	(	)	*	+	,	-	.	/
3x	0	1	2	3	4	5	6	7	8	9	:	;	<	=	>	?
4x	@	A	B	C	D	E	F	G	H	I	J	K	L	M	N	O
5x	P	Q	R	S	T	U	V	W	X	Y	Z	↑	↓	←	→	_
6x		a	b	c	d	e	f	g	h	i	j	k	l	m	n	o
7x	p	q	r	s	t	u	v	w	x	y	z	{	|	}	~	±
8x	NBSP	🬀	🬁	🬂	🬃	🬄	🬅	🬆	🬇	🬈	🬉	🬊	🬋	🬌	🬍	🬎
9x	🬏	🬐	🬑	🬒	🬓	▌	🬔	🬕	🬖	🬗	🬘	🬙	🬚	🬛	🬜	🬝
Ax	🬞	🬟	🬠	🬡	🬢	🬣	🬤	🬥	🬦	🬧	▐	🬨	🬩	🬪	🬫	🬬
Bx	🬭	🬮	🬯	🬰	🬱	🬲	🬳	🬴	🬵	🬶	🬷	🬸	🬹	🬺	🬻	█
Cx	(Note: 192 to 255 are "Space Compression Codes", tabs for 0 to 63 spaces)	tab	tab	tab	tab	tab	tab	tab	tab	tab	tab	tab	tab	tab	tab	tab
Dx	tab	tab	tab	tab	tab	tab	tab	tab	tab	tab	tab	tab	tab	tab	tab	tab
Ex	tab	tab	tab	tab	tab	tab	tab	tab	tab	tab	tab	tab	tab	tab	tab	tab
Fx	tab	tab	tab	tab	tab	tab	tab	tab	tab	tab	tab	tab	tab	tab	tab	tab
