= JTES =

Japanese teletext standard

Example of Japanese JTES teletext

JTES, the Japanese Teletext Specification, is a protocol used for encoding Teletext pages, as well as other types of digital data, within the vertical blanking interval (VBI) of an analog video signal in Japan. It was adopted into the international standard CCIR 653 (now ITU-R BT.653) of 1986 as CCIR Teletext System D.

It supports the display of kanji, katakana and hiragana characters. The service can be used to display subtitles, cyclic text pages or pseudo-interactive programs. There's support for the presentation of photographs, geometry or sound.

== History ==
The development of teletext in Japan started in 1972, followed by the announcement of the world's first teletext system (Ceefax) by the BBC in the United Kingdom.

Because Japanese characters are different from the Western alphabets, Japan proceeded with research and development of a specific transmission method called the "pattern method"where it sends scanning signals similar to a fax, at a rate 20 times faster than existing methods, but requires a character generator with a large (at the time) 1-megabit ROM. This method was adopted in 1982.

The first receiver prototype was capable of displaying 1258 characters, and a 48-kilobyte character generation ROM, integrated into a single chip. During the 1970s the problem of error correction (causing wrong characters to be displayed) was studied. These problems were solved in the early 1980s, allowing the service to start.

An alternative method of transmission, called the "hybrid method" was developed by NHK in 1979. It allowed faster transmissions rated and was adopted as a standard in October 1985.

Experimental broadcasts started on October 3, 1983, by NHK in Tokyo and Osaka using the "pattern method". This included subtitles and other so-called "supplementary" or "independent programs", where information unrelated to the TV program being shown is displayed. For example, at the time of the Great Hanshin Earthquake, information about vital services and names of victims were broadcast for days. To accompany the introduction of the system, Sony released the "TXT-10" decoder with a cost of 119,000 yen, and Sharp released "21C-L1", a TV with a built in decoder.

In 1984 Nippon TV (NTV) experimented with Teletext between March and July.

Regular transmissions started on November 29, 1985 (covering the entire country by 1986) by NHK ("Telemo Japan" service) and NTV ("AXES4" service), using the "hybrid method". NHK broadcast 759 hours of teletext per week during 1985, with eight different programs such as news, weather, public announcements and subtitles.

In 1986, TV Asahi started broadcasts with a service named "TV Asahi Data Vision", that remained active up to 24 July 2011. Other channels, such as Tokyo Broadcasting System (TBS) with "Tokyo Data Vision" or TV Tokyo with "Nikkei Telepress", along with Fuji TV and Tokyo Metropolitan Television also had Teletext services.

As of 1995, 20 television models with built-in Teletext receivers were available in the Japanese market.

== Description ==
In a normal NTSC video signal, there are 525 scan lines of video signal. These are split into two half-images, known as "fields", sent every 60th of a second. These images merge on-screen, and in-eye, to form a single frame of video updated every 30th of a second. Each line of each field takes 63.5 μs to send; 50.3 μs of video and 13.2 μs amount of "dead time" on each end used to signal the television that the line is complete, known as the horizontal blanking interval (HBI). When the scanning process reaches the end of the screen it returns to the top during the vertical blanking interval (VBI), which, like the HBI requires some "dead time" to properly frame the signal on the screen. In this case, the dead time is represented by unused lines of the picture signal, normally the top 22 lines of the frame.

At the beginning of the service, JTES used four of these lines to transmit information, with 176 bits of data transmitted per scanning line.

JTES encodes data into the video signal as a series of dots at a fixed rate of 5.727272 Mbit/s. Each line of a field has 50.3 μs of video area that can be used for transmission, which results in 296 bits per line.

It's possible to change the character code set (JIS C 6226 Japanese Industrial Standard, containing 6879 graphic characters suitable for writing text, place names, personal names, etc. in the Japanese language, defined in 1978), to express appropriate characters or enhance transmission efficiency. If a character is not available in the Teletext receiver character generator, it can be created using "DRCS" (Dynamically Redefinable Character Sets).

Characters can be transmitted as a mosaic of semigraphic elements, with each element having a resolution of 8 × 12 pixels.

There was support for sound generation using the YM2413 sound chip. Yet sound and images could be transmitted using PCM, using an error correction system called "BEST".

Several information codings are possible:

- Mosaic - a mosaic of semigraphic blocks, similar to how graphics are composed on other teletext systems
- DRCS - allows characters not available on the character generator
- Single-layer photographic - transmits image data (pixels, limited number of colors) instead of blocks, significantly slower
- Multi-layer photographic - transmits images or animations with a large number of colors, much slower
- Geometric - generates images from lines, arcs, rectangles and polygons. Similar to NABTS teletext.

== List of Japanese teletext services ==
- Telemo Japan (NHK)
- TV Asahi Data Vision (TV Asahi) (7 April 1986 – 24 July 2011)
- AXES4 (Nippon TV) (1985 – 31 March 2007)
- Tokyo Data Vision (TBS)
- Fuji TV
- Tokyo Metropolitan Television
- Nikkei Telepress (TV Tokyo)

== See also ==
- Antiope - French teletext standard (CCIR Teletext System A)
- NABTS – North American Broadcast Teletext Specification (CCIR Teletext System C)
- CAPTAIN - Japanese videotex system created by NTT
- NAPLPS – North American Presentation Level Protocol Syntax
- Videotex character set
- Text semigraphics
