= AT&T Sceptre =

Videotext terminal launched by AT&T in 1983

The AT&T Sceptre was a graphical terminal launched by AT&T in October 1983, used for the two largest deployments of videotex in the United States: Knight Ridder's Viewtron service in Florida, and the Los Angeles Times' Gateway service in Southern California. The Sceptre was the basic bit of home kit needed for the services, to paint NAPLPS-standard geometrically-specified pages to the screen.

The set top unit came with a separate battery-powered infrared wireless keyboard and an integrated 1200/75 baud 7-bit modem, and used a domestic television set for display. Internally it was based on an Intel 8088 processor, the same as used in the original IBM PC, with 127K ROM and 48K RAM, and display circuitry based on a 6845 CRTC. These provided a high resolution raster display, in 16 colors chosen from a palette of 256–more than supported by most home computers of the time. However, unlike those machines the Sceptre was strictly a dedicated terminal. There was no possibility of using it for independent computing.

The Sceptre was initially offered at $600, an "introductory discount" on an intended list price of $900. (It was said that each one cost AT&T $1200 to manufacture). Specifying the Sceptre gave the videotex services the advantage of a single graphics standard to design their pages to, and it positioned the services squarely as aiming for the more general domestic consumer-electronics customer, rather than a more specialist computing sector. But there were few takers at the price, and sales were not helped by the further subscription and access connection charges, the leisurely speed of the system, and the relatively uninvolving nature of the information on the service. In May 1984 Viewtron responded by offering combined rental of the Sceptre and subscription for $39.95 a month, but take-up was still slight, and in May 1985 Viewtron belatedly opened the service to microcomputers.

Both Viewtron and the Times-Mirror's Gateway service folded in March 1986. It was estimated that between them the two services had cost the ventures' owners and their partners in the region of $80 million. Keyfax, a third NAPLPS-based service, based in Chicago, had offered its users an alternative Honeywell Synertek design, somewhat sleeker in appearance than ATT's Sceptre, initially for $750, later reduced to $350; or to use their own computers. Its service was also closed down, in May 1986.

The NAPLPS protocol was later re-used for the basis of the graphics of the Prodigy online service, which began in 1988. But this was wholly directed at microcomputer owners running special software. It made no attempt to seek users with dedicated terminals.
