= Antiope (teletext) =

French teletext standard

Antiope was a French teletext standard in the 1980s. It also formed the basis for the display standard used in the French videotex service Minitel. The term allegedly stood for Acquisition Numérique et Télévisualisation d’Images Organisées en Pages d’Écriture, which could be loosely translated as Digital Acquisition and Remote Visualization of Images Organized into Written Pages.

== History ==
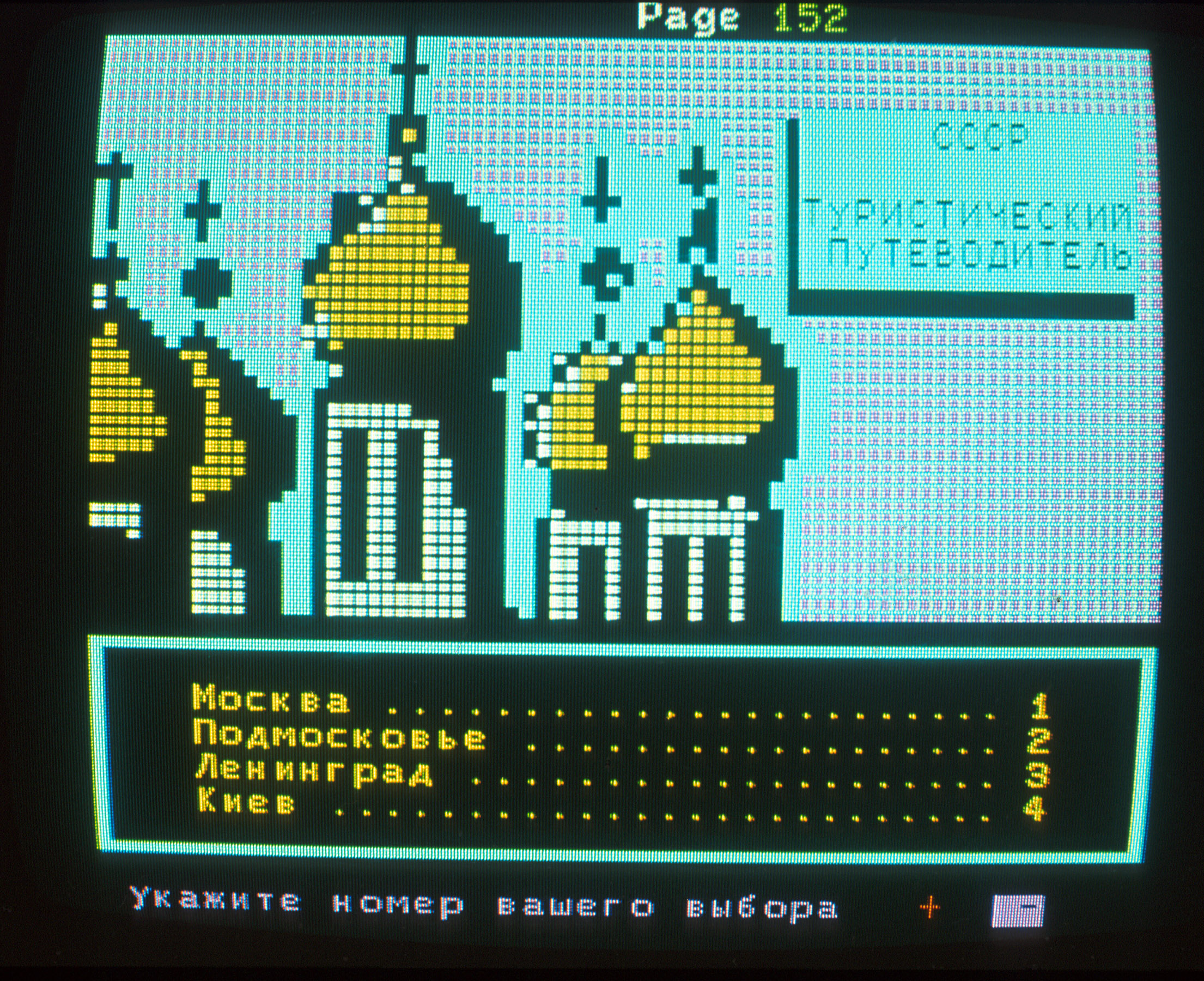
Antiope videotex page used during the СПОРТ exhibition in Moscow (1976)

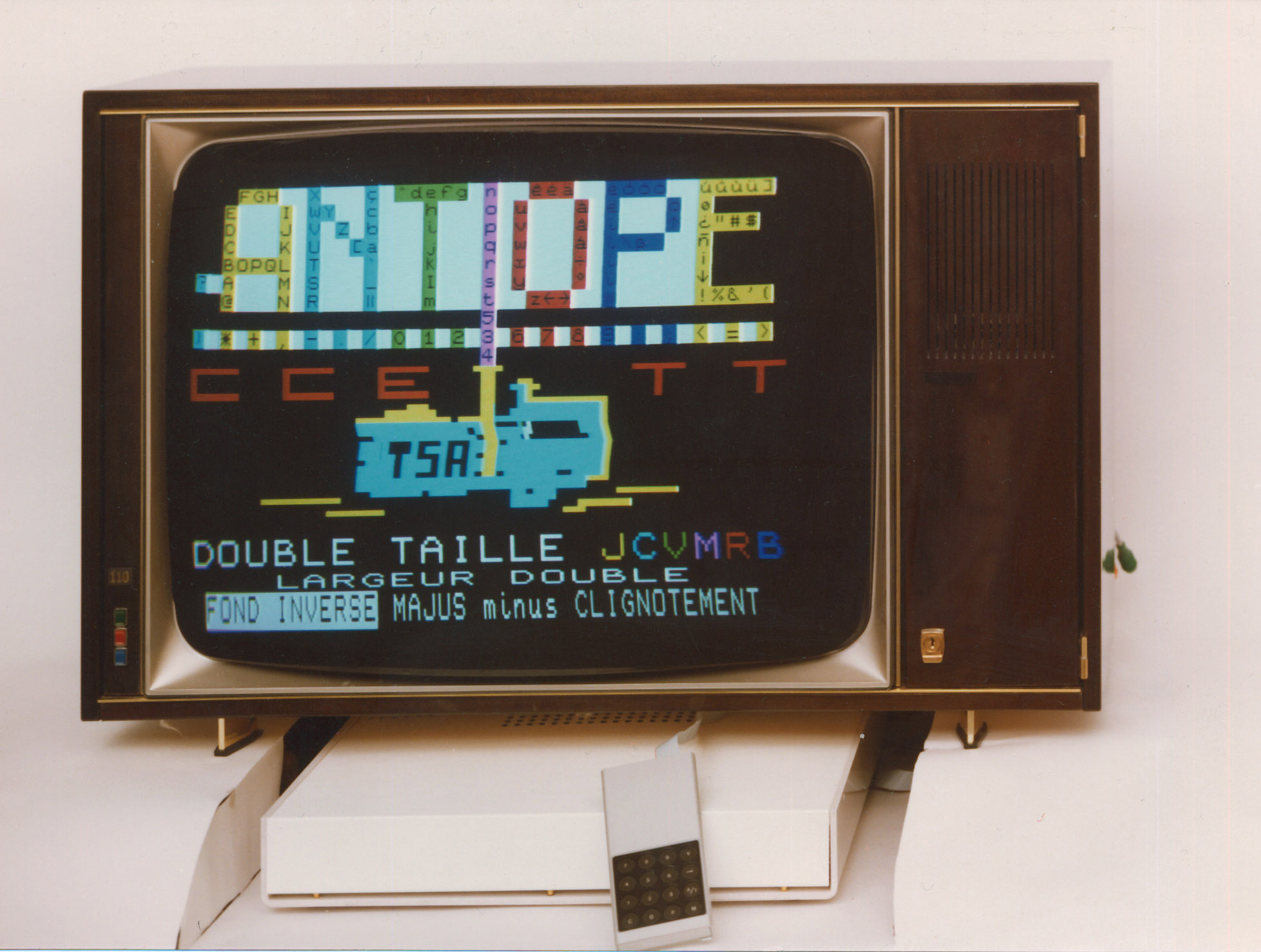
Antiope videotex demonstration page (1976)

Work on Antiope started in 1972 at CCETT, the newly merged French national research centre for television and telecommunications in Rennes, with first field trials in 1975. The system was officially launched in 1976 at Vidcom in Cannes, and simultaneously at the СПОРТ 76 exposition in Moscow. It was adopted into the international standard CCIR 653 (now ITU-R BT.653) of 1986 as CCIR Teletext System A.

Commercial broadcasting of Antiope began on Antenne 2 in 1979. To publicise the service, pages were even transmitted en clair instead of the test card (compare the BBC's Pages from Ceefax). TF1 and FR3 both also began to broadcast Antiope content from the early 1980s. Antiope decoding was initially by set-top boxes connected to the television by a SCART cable. Grundig France began to sell TVs with integrated decoders from 1983, followed by other manufacturers.

Antenne 2 began using the system to broadcast teletext subtitles for the hard-of-hearing in 1983, with three programmes subtitled by the end of the year. The number rose to 15 programmes across the three channels in 1984, and 30 in 1985.

Attempts had been made to sell the system internationally, including test broadcasts in the United States and the Soviet Union. In 1980, CBS had lobbied U.S. Federal Communications Commission (FCC) directly to make Antiope the teletext standard for the United States. However, by 1986, all these efforts had failed. Across Europe 9 million sets had been sold equipped to receive teletext based on the UK standard; whereas in France, the only country using Antiope, sales had only reached 100,000.

Manufacture of Antiope-equipped TV sets ceased in 1987, and in 1989 broadcasts began in the rival European standard World System Teletext. For a while the two services were broadcast in parallel, but Antiope broadcasts finally ceased in the early 1990s.

Although the transport protocols were different, much of the on-screen functionality of Antiope was recreated in the extended so-called Hi-Text Level 2.5 version of the European standard, first broadcast in 1994 by the bilingual French-German channel ARTE.

The Antiope-derived Minitel remained in use until 2012.

== Technology ==
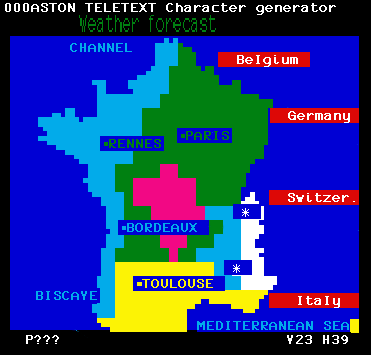
A Ceefax-style weather map for France

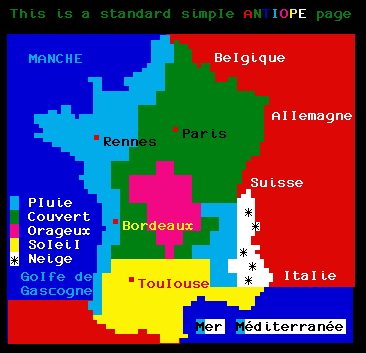
The same page in the Antiope system

Antiope was based on a 40 × 25 character grid using ISO 646 and ISO 2022, with support for accented letters. A fundamental difference in technical philosophy between Antiope and the Ceefax teletext system developed by the BBC stemmed from the fact that Antiope was developed by telecommunications engineers, while Ceefax was developed by television engineers. The television engineers created a system which filled the screen with data at a fixed, predictable rate; in contrast Antiope was constructed like a packet-switching system, with variable length packets of data, as might be used on a telephone network.

In both cases, the teletext data was transmitted during the vertical blanking interval, the portion of time allocated for the electron beam to return from the bottom of the screen back up to the top between each frame of the image (which corresponds to a transmission time of 25 lines in each field of PAL or SECAM), and each line used conveyed a fixed number of bytes each cycle: 40 bytes for European systems, 32 in the United States. In the BBC Ceefax system each group of 40 bytes corresponded directly to one row of 40 characters, each byte representing both the character and its place in the row – a video synchronous system.

In contrast, in the case of Antiope the delivery packet was independent of the screen presentation. One 40-byte packet might contain several rows; another might contain only part of a row, if it contained several colour changes or accented characters (coded with two or three bytes). In return, colour changes, or switches to graphical mode (called "mosaic"), which each had to take up one character space in the row on a Ceefax page, could be made freely in Antiope, allowing the construction of more elaborate pages.

Ceefax pages could be displayed using fairly simple hardware, using a character generator and a simple latch to keep track of the attributes in force at a particular character position as the page is scanned. Antiope was only a little more complicated, the relevant attributes for each character position (about 13 bits, or a few more if further additional fonts were in use) being stored in a separate memory page in the decoder, distinct from the memory page used for the characters.

This flexibility of Antiope provided a foundation on which multilingual and multialphabet systems were developed, and also systems using dynamically redefinable character sets (DRCS), especially in variants delivered over the telephone (videotex).

== See also ==
- World System Teletext - European teletext standard (CCIR Teletext System B)
- NABTS – North American Teletext Specification (CCIR Teletext System C)
- JTES - Japanese Teletext Specification (CCIR Teletext System D)
- NAPLPS – North American Presentation Level Protocol Syntax
- List of teletext services
- ISO/IEC 646 - Antiope character set
- Text semigraphics
