= Intercast =

Short-lived technology developed in 1996 by Intel for broadcasting information

Intercast was a technology developed in 1996 by Intel for broadcasting information such as web pages and computer software, along with a single television channel. It required a compatible TV tuner card installed in a personal computer and a decoding program called Intel Intercast Viewer. The data for Intercast was embedded in the Vertical Blanking Interval (VBI) of the video signal carrying the Intercast-enabled program, at a maximum of 10.5 Kilobytes/sec in 10 of the 45 lines of the VBI.

With Intercast, a computer user could watch the TV broadcast in one window of the Intercast Viewer, while being able to view HTML web pages in another window. Users were also able to download software transmitted via Intercast as well. Most often the web pages received were relevant to the television program being broadcast, such as extra information relating to a television program, or extra news headlines and weather forecasts during a newscast. Intercast can be seen as a more modern version of teletext.

The Intercast Viewer software was bundled with several TV tuner cards at the time, such as the Hauppauge Win-TV card. Also at the time of Intercast's introduction, Compaq offered some models of computers with built-in TV tuners installed with the Intercast Viewer software.

Upon its debut, Intercast was used by several TV networks, such as NBC, CNN, The Weather Channel, and MTV Networks.

On June 25, 1996, Intel and NBC announced an arrangement which enabled users to watch coverage of the 1996 Summer Olympics and other programming from NBC News.

Intel discontinued support for Intercast a couple of years later.

NBC's series Homicide: Life on the Street was a show that was Intercast-enabled.
