= Delphi (online service) =

Online service

Delphi Forums
- Logo (2016)
- Website type: Internet forum
- Available in: English
- Owner: Dan Bruns
- Website: www.delphiforums.com
- Commercial: No
- Registration: Required
- Launched: 1981
- Current status: Active

Logo from 1997

Delphi Forums is a U.S. online service provider and since the mid-1990s has been a community internet forum site. It started as a nationwide dialup service in 1983. Delphi Forums remains active as of 2026.

== History ==
The company that became Delphi was founded by Wes Kussmaul as Kussmaul Encyclopedia in 1981 and featured an encyclopedia, e-mail, and a primitive chat. Newswires, bulletin boards and better chat were added in early 1982.

Kussmaul recalled:

Delphi was actually launched in October 1981, at Jerry Milden's Northeast Computer Show, as the Kussmaul Encyclopedia--the world's first commercially available computerized encyclopedia. (Frank Greenagle's Arête Encyclopedia was announced at about the same time, but you couldn't buy it until much later.) The Kussmaul Encyclopedia was actually a complete home computer system (your choice of Tandy Color Computer or Apple II) with a 300-bps modem that dialed up to a VAX computer hosting our online encyclopedia database. We sold the system for about the same price and terms as Britannica. People wandered around in it and were impressed with the ease with which they could find information. We had a wonderful cross-referencing system that turned every occurrence of a word that was the name of an entry in the encyclopedia into a hypertext link—in 1981...

In November 1982, Wes hired Glenn McIntyre as a software engineer primarily doing internal systems. Glenn brought in colleagues Kip Bryan and Dan Bruns. Kip wrote the software that became Delphi Conference and Delphi Forums. Dan upon finishing his MBA at Harvard, become president and subsequently CEO when Wes moved on to form Global Villages.

On March 15, 1983, the Delphi name was first used by General Videotex Corporation. Forums were text-based, and accessed via Telenet, Sprintnet, Tymnet, Uninet, and Datapac. In 1984, it had 4 million members.

Delphi was extended to Argentina in 1985, through a partnership with the Argentine IT company Siscotel S.A.

Delphi partnered with ASCII Corp. of Japan to open online services in 1991.

Delphi provided national consumer access to the Internet in 1992. Features included E-mail (July 1992), FTP, Telnet, Usenet, text-based Web access (November 1992), MUDs, Finger, and Gopher. "To a lot of people at the time, we seemed to be in an enviable position" says Dan Bruns, Delphi's CEO. "But we didn't have a lot of financing to fuel our growth..."

In 1993, Delphi was sold to Rupert Murdoch's News Corporation. News Corporation recognized that there would be growth in consumer use of the internet and attempted to use Delphi as its vehicle. It had 125,000 text-based customers in 1995 and had 150 employees. Murdoch hired away IBM's director of high-performance computing and communications, Alan Baratz, in 1994 to run Delphi. Under Baratz, Delphi acquired space in Cross Point, an office complex in Lowell, Massachusetts constructed for Wang Laboratories, and built a large state-of-the-art server farm. Bruns and General Manager Rusty Williams stayed on. Delphi peaked with 500,000 paid subscribers and about 600 employees.

By 1995, Delphi had lost many of its subscribers, and Bruns left Delphi. In 1996, NewsCorp decided to exit the online business, was laying off almost half of Delphi's employees and wanted to sell or close Delphi. Dan Bruns and some of Delphi's original investors bought Delphi from NewsCorp for an undisclosed amount. With only 50,000 paying subscribers left, Delphi was back to its pre-NewsCorp size. "We were on the same growth slope, but this time we were going down instead of up," he says. "It felt a little poetic."

In 1996, Delphi launched a free, ad-supported managed-content website with associated message boards and chat rooms, under the management of a team led by Dan Bruns and which included Bill Louden, who had headed GEnie during its heyday. For a period of time, both text-based and web-based community services were available. After a year as a managed content site, Delphi reinvented itself as a community-driven service that allowed anyone to create an online community.

Prospero Technologies was formed in January 2000 as the merger of Delphi Forums and Wellengaged. Webpages for forums were discontinued.

In 2001, Rob Brazell purchased Delphi Forums, merged it with eHow and Idea Exchange, and formed Blue Frogg Enterprises. The Delphi.com domain was sold to Delphi Corporation, the auto parts manufacturer. Prospero was sold to Inforonics.

In 2002, Prospero reacquired Delphi Forums, joining it with Talk City to form Delphi Forums LLC.

In 2008, online community developer Mzinga acquired Littleton-based Prospero Technologies LLC, which was then owned by Bruce Buckland, chairman and CEO of Mallory Ventures. In March 2009, a Forrester Research analyst reported on Twitter that Mzinga was having financial difficulties after it had completed a second round of layoffs. On September 1, 2011, Mzinga sold Delphiforums back to early owner Dan Bruns.

In January 2012, Delphi Forums resigned from the Better Business Bureau in protest of their support for the Stop Online Piracy Act (SOPA).

Delphi's 30th Anniversary Logo (2013)

In February 2013, Delphi Forums celebrated its 30th anniversary. Delphi owner Dan Bruns said, "It's true that the Delphi that launched in 1983 was very different from today's internet," Bruns said, "but one thing remains the same: places like Delphi Forums provide a friendly, comfortable setting for people to share common interests and passions and to build lasting friendships. If we keep that simple truth in mind, we have a terrific legacy to build on going forward."

During 2014, Delphi Forums began a beta test of a new forum interface, called Zeta. The current long-time format, now called Classic, also remains, and hosts may use either interface.

== See also ==
- Stellar Conquest
