= Ross Video =

Manufacturer of television production and broadcasting equipment

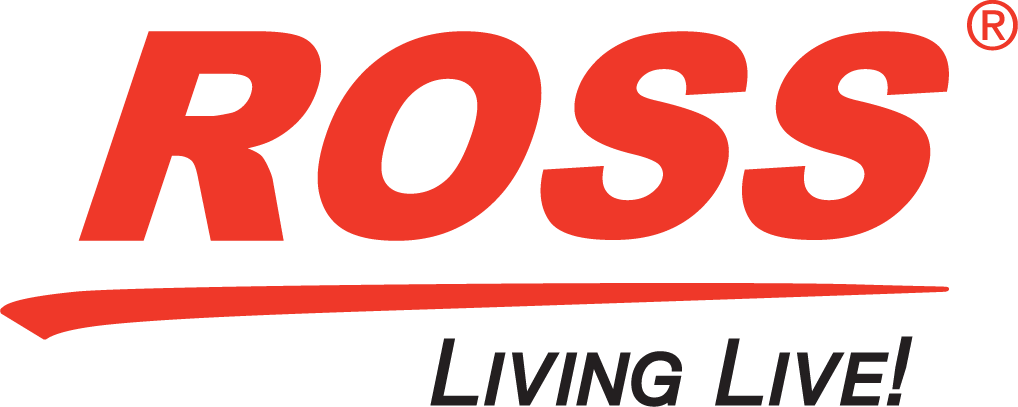
- Type: Private
- Industry: ICT - Broadcast and Media segment
- Founded: 1974; 52 years ago
- Founder: John Ross
- Headquarters: Iroquois, Ontario, Canada,
- Area served: Worldwide
- Key people: David Ross (CEO); George Angus (CFO); Jeff Moore (Senior VP & CMO); Troy English (CTO)
- Number of employees: 1500
- Website: www.rossvideo.com

Ross Video Ltd is a privately held Canadian company that designs and manufactures equipment for live event and video production. Ross Video's headquarters and manufacturing operations are located in Iroquois, Ontario, Canada, while their R&D labs are in Ottawa, Ontario, Canada.

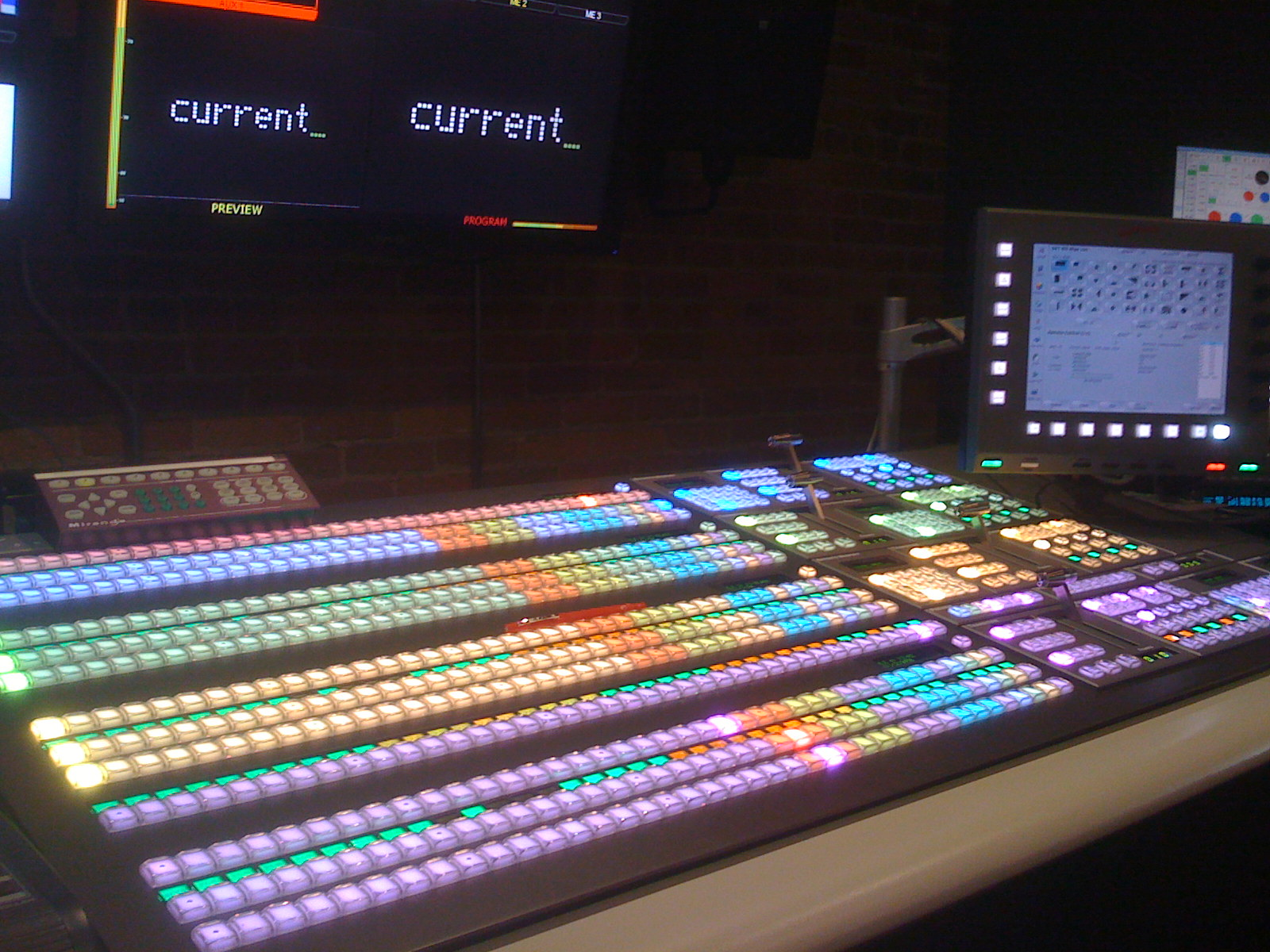
Ross Video Vision 4 at Current TV

== History ==
John Ross, a former engineer with the Canadian Broadcasting Corporation (CBC), founded Ross Video in Iroquois, Ont., in 1974 to make production switchers. Jim Leitch, founder of Leitch Video (acquired by Harris), initially suggested that Ross should start the company. The primary seed funding for the company came from the sale of a Taylorcraft L-2 that John Ross had restored.

The company's first generation of switchers was the RVS family. The RVS 16–4, the first switcher made, was followed closely by the RVS 10-4 (a 16–4 with 10 video inputs). The first downstream keyer (DSK) could be added to the 10-4 to allow the addition of more video layers.

Ross launched its second generation of switchers with the “500 Series” in 1978 which included Multi-Level Effects (MLE's), letting operators preview content before putting on the air. MLE is the Ross branded term for ME.

In 1983, the company launched the Encore Memory System option which converted every switch and knob position to digital to be stored for future recall. Then, in 1985, Ross introduced its third generation of switchers which were smaller and talked to the control panel over a serial link, using microprocessors in the chassis to control the electronics.

The company was hit hard by the early 1990s recession, but has since recovered, reporting 25+ consecutive years of growth.

John Ross' son David joined the company full-time in 1991 and was later promoted to Director, Product Development, responsible for all product development in the company, then to Executive Vice President, President, and then to CEO in April 2006. In November 2005, David Ross assumed the position of Chairman of the Board and is now the majority shareholder of Ross Video with over 80% ownership.

Today, the firm makes hardware and software for live and pre-programmed TV production, including cameras, production switchers, graphics, robotic camera systems, routing and infrastructure systems, signal processing solutions, production automation systems, newsroom computer systems and social media management tools. Its broadcast customers include Shaw, NBC and Univision, and its mobile productions unit produces sports events for ESPN, NBC and Fox. Ross equipment and systems have even been used to make graphics for the Super Bowl, the Academy Awards (Oscars) and Grammys. The company also provides stadium graphics for professional sports teams including the Ottawa Senators, New York Mets and Buffalo Bills.

=== Acquisitions ===
From 2009 to 2021 Ross has acquired 18 companies in this order:

- Media Refinery (Graphics)
- Norpak (Data Insertion)
- Codan Broadcast (Routers)
- Fx-Motion (Robotics)
- Cambotics (Robotics)
- Montalto (Router R&D)
- Mobile Content Providers (Mobile Production Packagers)
- Automated Data Systems (Newsroom Systems & Prompting)
- Unreel (Virtual Sets and Augmented Reality Solutions)
- Rocket Surgery (Motion Graphics Creative Services)
- Abekas (Video Servers and Replay)
- Coveloz (Live Networking Experts & Consulting)
- Portalis (KVM Systems)
- PIERO (Sports Graphics)
- Coiron (Graphics)
- Image Video (TSI Tally Control Platform)
- Primestream (Media Asset Workflow Solutions)
- D3 LED (LED displays)
- Spidercam (Cable Camera System)

Ross Video made these acquisitions in 2024-5:

- Bannister Lake Software (2024), data-driven and HTML5 graphics software.
- EagleEye (2025), aerial cable-camera system from sec.swiss.
- LAMA (2025), live audio mixing software.
- ioversal (2025), creator of the Vertex platform for immersive experiences.
