= NBC Teletext =

American teletext service

- Developer: NBC
- Type: Teletext
- Launched: 1983
- Discontinued: 1985
- Platform: NABTS
- Status: Discontinued

NBC Teletext was a teletext service provided by the American TV network NBC from 1981 to 1985, based on the NABTS standard.

Initial trials started in Los Angeles in 1981. Transmissions started as a regular service on May 16, 1983 after FCC approval, in parallel with CBS similar ExtraVision service.

Initially, the NBC Teletext was composed of a 50-page magazine, with the index page listing the following topics: Newsfront, Weather, Sports, Money, People, Your Body, Living, Your Stars, On the Soaps, Fun & Games, Kid's Korner, Partners, Credits. Graphics were reasonably detailed, allowing a detailed rendition of weather maps or movie posters.

Since teletext provides real-time updates, it was expected that the service would attract advertisers like airlines, stores or businesses interested in constantly updating their rates and schedules. As there were no available standalone consumer decoders on the market, it was hoped that by launching the system manufacturers would soon built teletext capability into all television sets.

Demonstrations of the system were performed at the 1983 National Association of Broadcasters convention in Las Vegas, the Organization of Iberian-American Broadcasters (OTI) in Mexico City, and the International Television Symposium and Technical Exhibition in Montreux. Special content was developed for these demonstrations.

In 1984 projections, NBC expected the teletext service to be profitable by 1987 and reach 10 percent of US homes by 1990.

These expectations were not met, and the system was shut down in January 1985.
