= Norpak =

Canadian electronics company

- Industry: Data Transmission
- Defunct: 2010
- Fate: Acquired by Ross Video Limited
- Headquarters: Kanata, Ontario, Canada

Norpak Corporation was a company headquartered in Kanata, Ontario, Canada, that specialized in the development of systems for television-based data transmission. In 2010, it was acquired by Ross Video Ltd. of Iroquois and Ottawa, Ontario.

Norpak developed the NABTS (North American Broadcast Teletext Standard) protocol for teletext in the 1980s, as an improved version to the then-incumbent World System Teletext, or WST, protocol. NABTS was designed to improve graphics capability over WST, but required a much more complex and expensive decoder, making NABTS somewhat of a market failure for teletext. However, NABTS still thrives as a data protocol for embedding almost any form of digital data within the VBI of an analog video signal.

Norpak's products, now part of and complementary to the Ross Video line, include equipment for embedding data in a television or video signal such as for closed captioning, XDS, V-chip data, non-teletext NABTS data for closed-circuit data transmission, and other data protocols for VBI transmission.
