= Viewtron =

US videotex service

- Viewtron opening menu screen
- Developer: Knight-Ridder, AT&T
- Type: Videotex
- Launched: 1983; 43 years ago
- Discontinued: March 31, 1986; 40 years ago
- Platform: NAPLPS
- Status: Discontinued

Viewtron was an online service offered by Knight-Ridder and AT&T from 1983 to 1986. Patterned after the British Post Office's Prestel system, it started as a videotex service requiring users to have a special terminal, the AT&T Sceptre. As home computers became important in the marketplace, the development focus shifted to IBM, Apple, Commodore and other personal computers.

Viewtron differed from contemporary services like CompuServe and The Source by emphasizing news from The Miami Herald and Associated Press and e-commerce services from JCPenney and other merchants over computer-oriented services such as file downloads or online chat. Intended to be "the McDonald's of videotex," Viewtron was specifically targeted toward users who would be apprehensive about using a computer.

Viewtron also offered airline schedules from the Official Airline Guide (OAG), real estate research from Century 21, e-cards from Hallmark, product information from Consumer Reports, educational software from Scott Foresman, online auctions, financial services from American Express and EF Hutton, as well as limited online banking services as part of a research program into the uses and costs of banking online that included 20 US and Canadian banks.

At its height, Viewtron was operated in at least 15 cities by various newspaper companies. After six years of research and an investment reportedly in excess of $50 million, Viewtron never turned a profit, and, despite its developer's forecasts of breaking even in two years, Knight Ridder did not expect it ever would be profitable. AT&T had invested over $100 million in the project, but was forced to write off that investment as part of its court-ordered breakup. Viewtron closed on March 31, 1986, after an attempt by the Independent Commodore Users Group to buy the service failed.

A feature tying Viewtron to local newspapers was envisioned, with printed text instructing users how to access further information online, but it was never implemented.

In 2008, PCWorld magazine named Viewtron to a list of the biggest project failures in information technology (IT) history.

== Technical details ==
Hosted on a fault-tolerant Tandem/16 minicomputer, Viewtron used the NAPLPS graphics language to provide a user interface that was graphically sophisticated by the standards of the time. According to Chip Bok, screens were crafted so as they loaded, elements would be drawn in sequence, "the way you would tell a story." Unlike HTML, NAPLPS allowed screen elements that remained unchanged through different pages of a story to remain static, an important concern with the low bandwidth 300-2400 baud modems then in use.

Despite being initially restricted to the chiclet keyboard-equipped AT&T Sceptre terminal, Viewtron's developers foresaw that general purpose personal computers would soon become the preferred way to consume online content. The Viewtron software was written from the beginning to be easily portable, and the work was able to be completed within 24 hours after the decision to refocus on home computer development.

Viewtron did not initially allow users to send private messages to each other, a conscious decision by Knight Ridder to exert editorial control. Knight Ridder's vision for the service was offering products and services for users to consume, not in providing a medium for communication. When interactive features were later added, Knight Ridder discouraged their use, fearing that users interacting directly with each other would lead to a "dystopia without newspapers."

== Service history ==
Known as "Bowsprit", Viewtron underwent a test period in 125 upper-income homes in Coral Gables, Florida from 1980 to 1981, where it was determined that customers would pay up to $600 for the required terminal. The stability of the Southern Bell phone system that would carry the data was also a factor in the launch location. The service went live in south Florida (Dade, Broward, Monroe, and Palm Beach counties) on October 30, 1983. Viewtron expanded to include all of Florida in 1984 and to other U.S. cities by 1985. After Viewtron went national, its subscriber base quickly grew from 3,000 users to 20,000. Despite its rapid growth, Viewtron soon learned that the majority of users dropped their subscriptions after six months, and the most used areas of the service among the remaining users were not Viewtron's news feeds, but the email and live chat.

At the service's introduction, customers could buy the AT&T terminal but after May 1984 it was only offered for rental at $39.95 per month, which included a subscription to the service. Other customers paid $12 per month, plus a $1 hourly charge for access. After October 1985, Viewtron was carried nationally over the Tymnet, Telenet, and Uninet time sharing networks in the US, and by Datapac in Canada at a surcharge of 9 cents per minute on nights and weekends, and 22 cents per minute on weekdays.

== Demise ==
Shortly after Viewtron's launch, Vice President Reid Ashe circulated a memo noting slower than expected sales and infrequent usage patterns. The memo drew the conclusion that people saw the service as a "toy" and weren't integrating Viewtron into their daily news routine. A crossed out statement in the memo discussed the differences between the newspaper business and online information delivery, noting the latter's lower cost of entry, lower profit margins, and likely increased competition. The act of crossing out this statement has been taken as a sign of Knight Ridder's unwillingness to recognize the changes in the news business that new technology was bringing and called into question Knight Ridder's intentions for Viewtron.

On March 31, 1985, the group within Knight Ridder responsible for developing Viewtron wrote Knight Ridder's board of directors advocating a new direction, one that pursued business and personal computer applications. The memo recommended lowering the monthly price of the service, discontinuing the AT&T terminal to concentrate on home computer development, and conducting another review in six months. The memo pointed out that this direction was preferable because it would compete with the newspapers less than the existing service.

Viewtron's downfall came when Knight Ridder discovered at the end of 1985 that, despite the bulk of its expenses going toward the service's news feeds, users were spending most of their online time using Viewtron's less-profitable email, message boards, and educational areas.

Instead of effectively becoming an online service provider, Knight Ridder decided to concentrate on its core news business, and Viewtron was discontinued on March 31, 1986. According to Philip Meyer, director of News and Circulation Research for Knight Ridder at the time, "We made the mistake of thinking in newspaper analogies. Thus the central computer was like a printing press in our minds, and telephone wires were the delivery trucks... . As newspaper people, we were looking for a community-based natural monopoly, like a newspaper, but without the variable costs of paper, ink, and transportation."

== Reception ==
Ahoy! praised Viewtron in its November 1985 issue, citing e-commerce, chat, news, and games as strengths and adding that the service had "the best customer service department it has ever been my pleasure to call."
