= CT Logistics =

American international logistics company

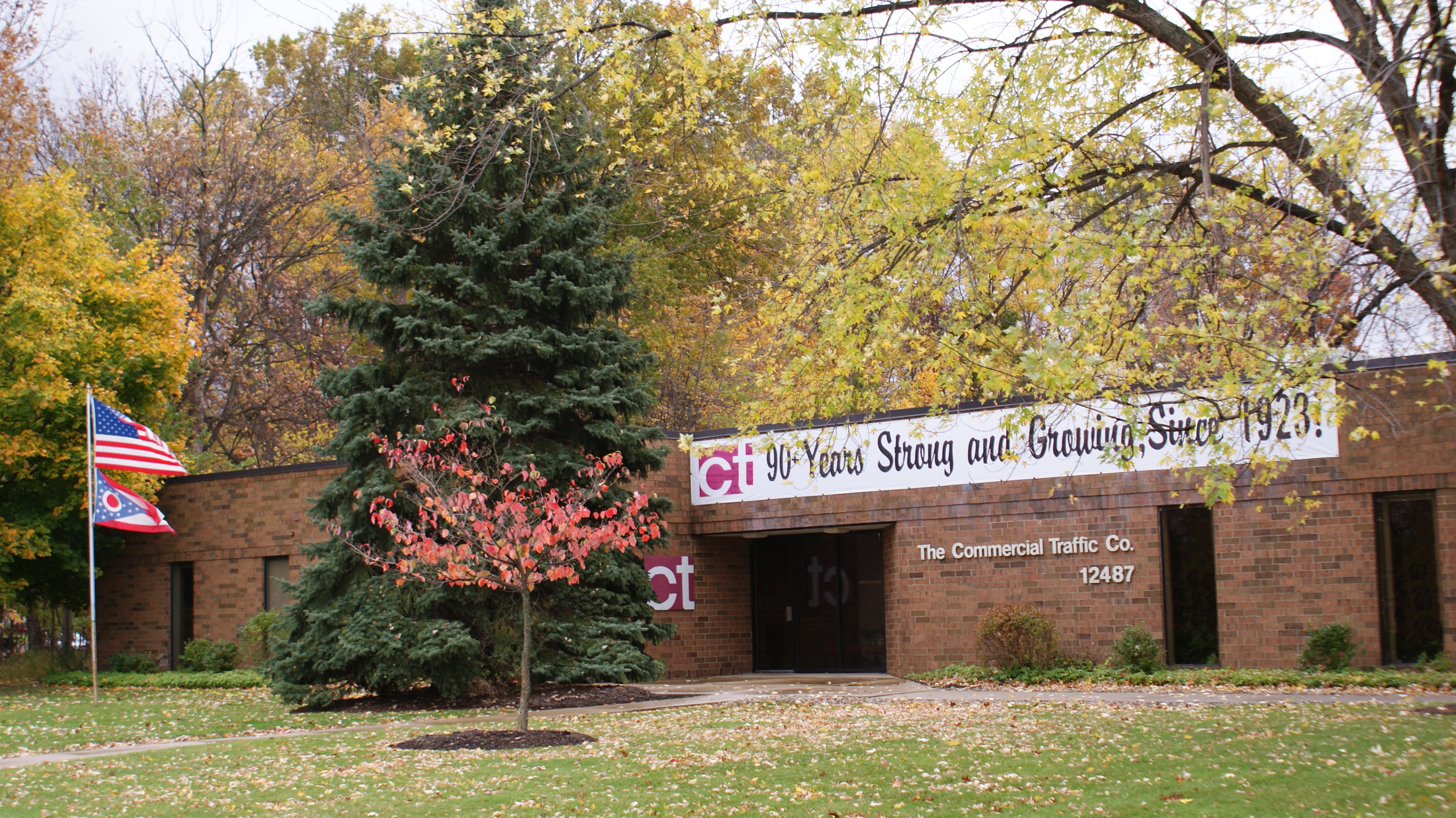
- Formerly: The Commercial Traffic Company
- Company type: Privately held company
- Industry: Supply Chain Management
- Founded: 1923; 103 years ago
- Headquarters: Cleveland, Ohio, United States
- Number of locations: Cleveland, USA, Birmingham, UK, Vinnitsa, Ukraine, Quezon City, Philippines
- Area served: Worldwide
- Key people: Allan J. Miner (President)
- Products: Transportation Management System, Freight Audit & Payment, Business intelligence, Consulting
- Number of employees: 85 (2025)
- Website: www.ctlogistics.com

CT Logistics is an American company that provides international supply chain management services. This includes freight audits, freight management software and systems and freight payment services.

== History ==
The company was founded in 1923 as The Commercial Traffic Company by a group of businessmen that included, H.R. Snyder (first president), W.A. Aichele, C.C. Kalbrunner, V.C. Borrows and H.W. Elsner.

In 1979, the company moved to a new facility on Plaza Drive in Parma, Ohio. In 1980, Jack H. Miner became President and in 1994 his son Allan J. Miner becomes Vice President. In 1990 it formed a software division and released the first version of FreitRater Software, in 2001 this became online software. In 2007, it opened an office in the United Kingdom and in 2015 in Ukraine and 2016 in the Philippines.

CT Logistics processes Sarbanes-Oxley-compliant freight payments in all modes for carriers and clients of all industries. The company utilizes 7 to 10 years of online data storage. CT Logistics consults on all aspects of supply chains.
