= CEPT Recommendation T/CD 06-01 =

Standard for display of videotex

CEPT Recommendation T/CD 06-01 was a standard set in 1981 by the European Conference of Postal and Telecommunications Administrations (CEPT) for the display of Videotex; specifically, for the Videotex Presentation Layer Data Syntax. It was revised a number of times in the 1980s, and also later redesignated as recommendation T/TE 06-01.

The standard aimed to bring a degree of harmonisation between Europe's emerging videotext systems, which had been diverging along national lines. It recognised four baseline profiles (with conformance criteria set out in Annex C) based on existing videotext services:

- CEPT1: BTX (Germany)
- CEPT2: Teletel (France)
- CEPT3: Prestel (UK)
- CEPT4: Prestel Plus (Sweden)

and defined criteria for a "harmonised enhanced" service.

National videotex services were encouraged to either follow one of the existing four basic profiles; or if they extended them, to do so in ways compatible with the harmonised enhanced specification.

Responsibility for the standard was passed to the new European Telecommunications Standards Institute (ETSI) in 1988. The ETSI version of the standard is designated ETS 300 072.
