= Captain (videotex) =

Japanese videotex system

Captain system
- Developer: NTT
- Type: Videotex
- Launched: November 1984; 41 years ago
- Discontinued: March 31, 2002; 24 years ago
- Status: Discontinued
- Members: 120,000 subscribers (March 1992)

The CAPTAIN system (for Character and Pattern Telephone Access Information Network system) was a Japanese videotex system created by NTT. Announced in 1978, it was trialled from 1979 to 1981, with a second larger trial held from 1982 to 1983. The service launched commercially in November 1984.

Captain differed from comparable European videotex systems by not being based on the transmission of alphanumeric characters. The Japanese kanji character set has over 3,500 characters, and in the late 1970s to try to include a character generator in the user's terminal that could retain and then generate so many characters on demand was seen as prohibitive. Instead pages were therefore substantially sent to the end user as pre-rendered images, using coding strategies similar to facsimile machines.

By December 1985, Captain had 650 information providers, and the next year was rolled out to 245 cities. However, by March 1992, the system still only had 120,000 subscribers.

Sanyo released a CAPTAIN adapter for MSX1 computers, and Yamaha released a similar device for the MSX2.

Like other videotex systems worldwide (with the exception of the French Minitel), it never broke through to achieve mass-market usage. The system was closed on March 31, 2002.

Sample CAPTAIN pages

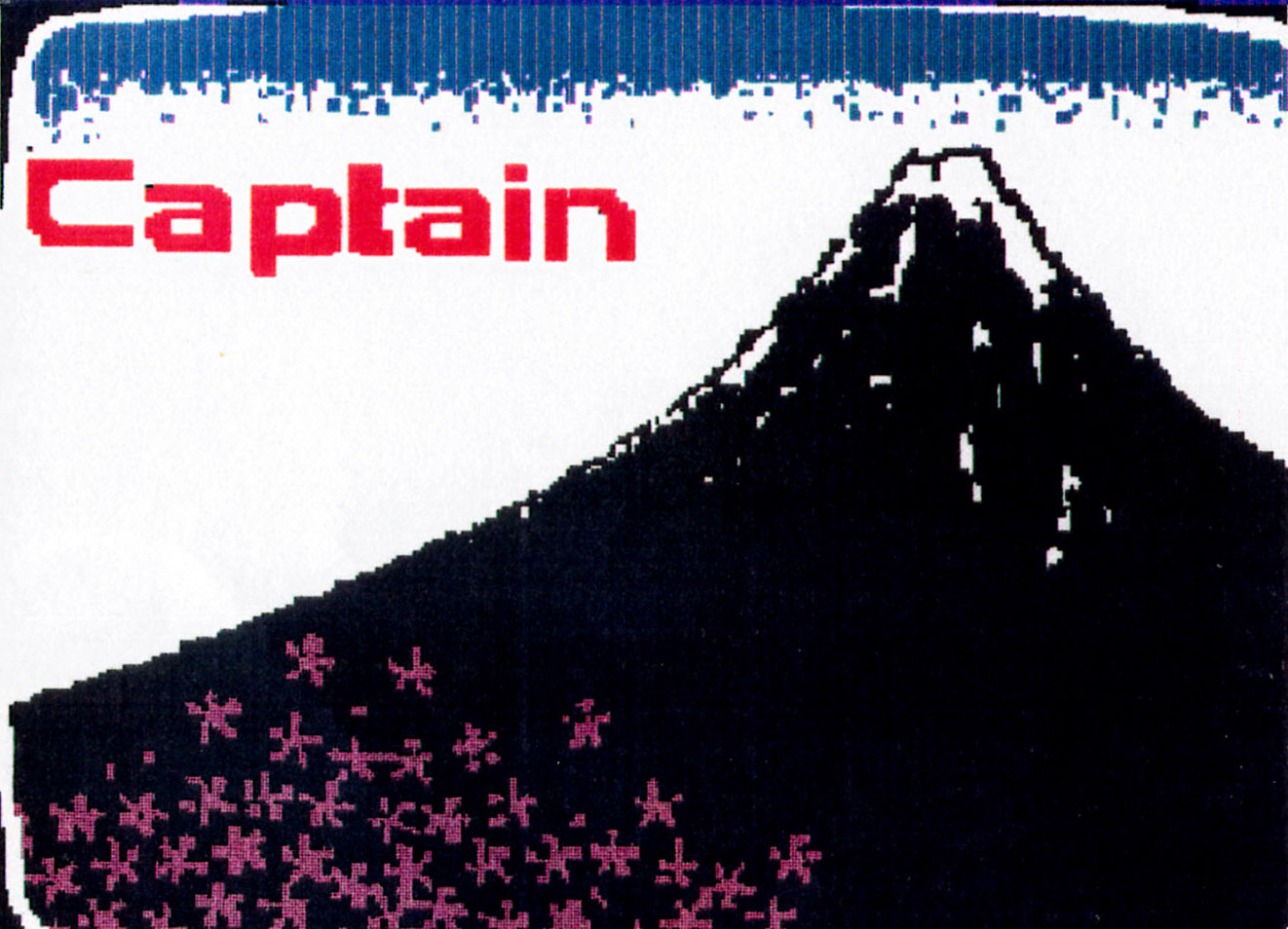
Home page

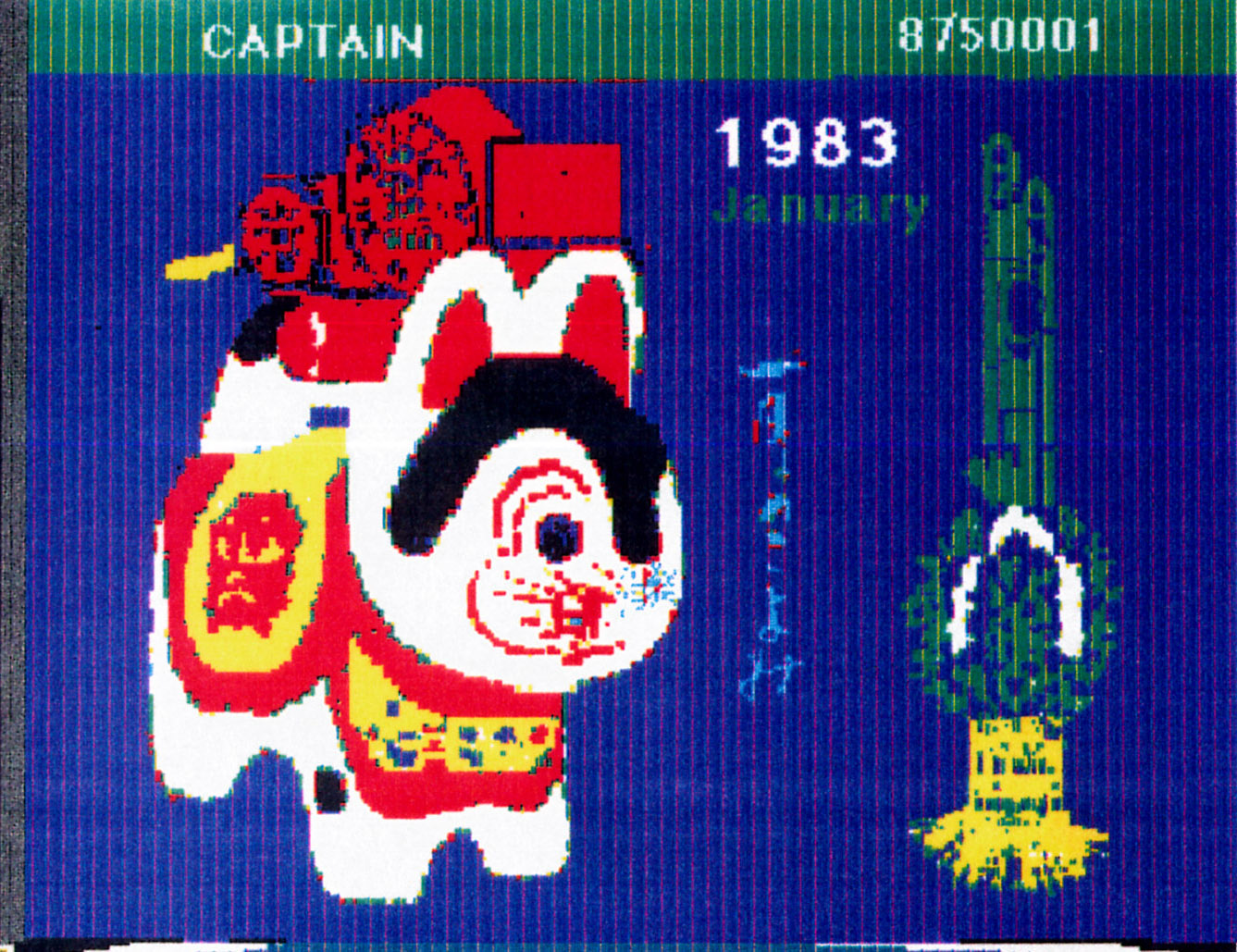

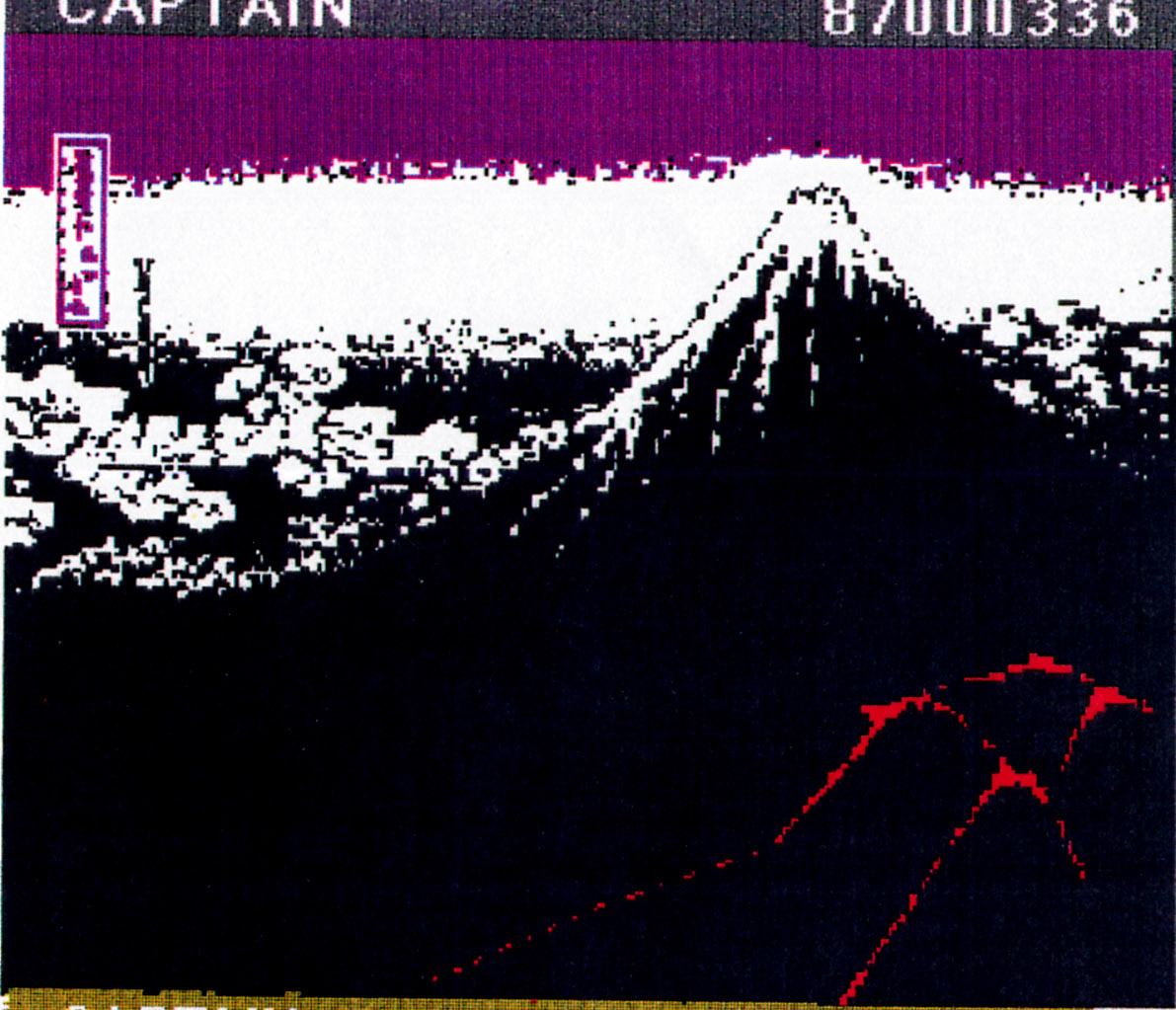

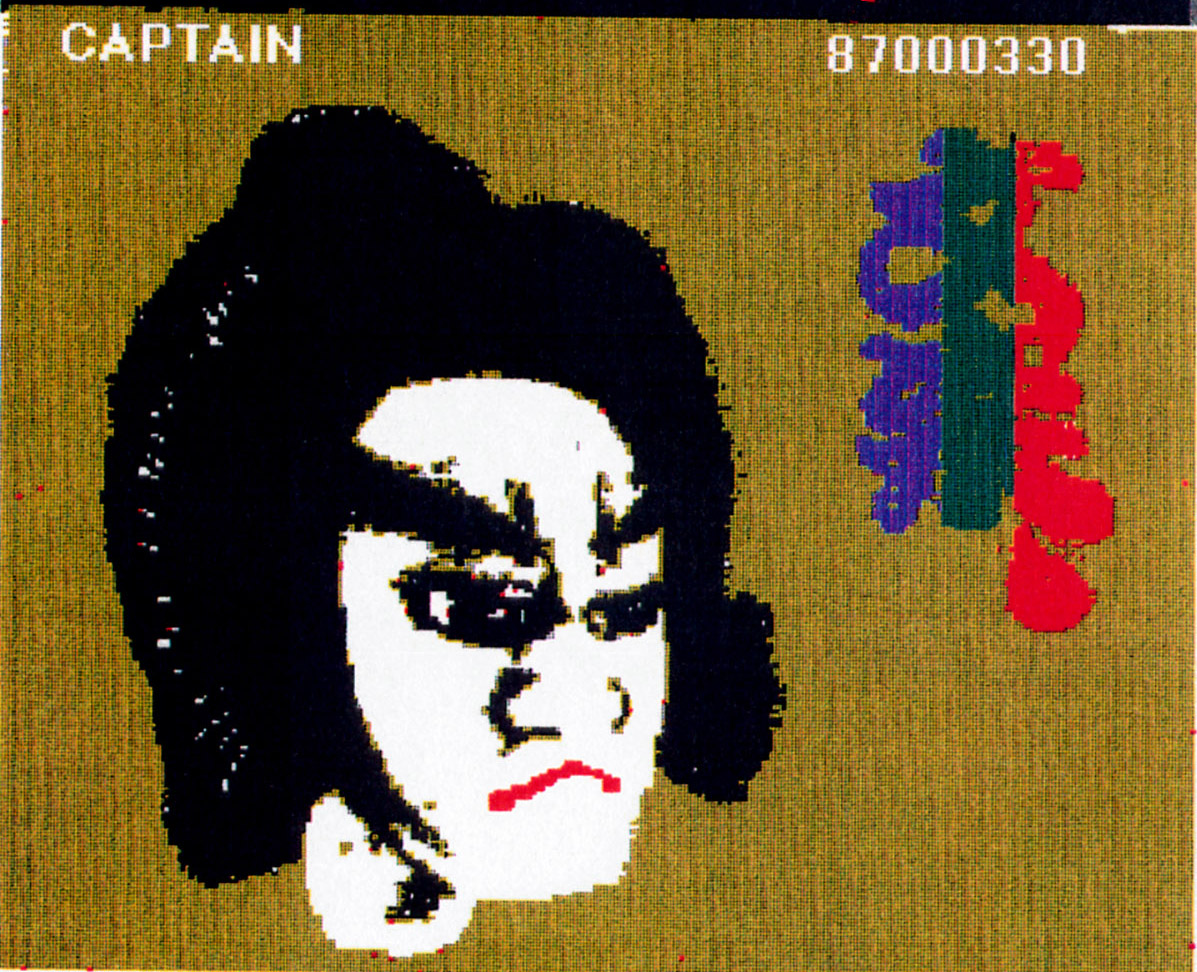
