= Timocom =

German IT and freight technology company

TIMOCOM GmbH
- Type: Limited liability company (Gesellschaft mit beschränkter Haftung)
- Industry: IT
- Headquarters: Erkrath, Germany
- Revenue: 89.9 million Euro (2022)
- Number of employees: over 700
- Website: http://www.timocom.com

TIMOCOM GmbH with head office in Erkrath is a German IT and freight technology company. TIMOCOM is the operator of Europe’s first Smart Logistics System, today known as Road Freight Marketplace. It was founded in 1997 and sees itself as an IT service provider for all companies involved in transport. Its flagship product is a freight exchange.

TIMOCOM has representative offices in Poland, Czech Republic and Hungary. The company achieved turnover of €74.6 million in the 2018 financial year. TIMOCOM employs more than 700 employees with over 40 different nationalities. TIMOCOM is one of the market leaders in Europe with its freight and vehicle exchange, originally TC Truck&Cargo. This exchange regulates supply and demand in road-based transport services through its own online marketplace. TIMOCOM has offered its networked applications, services and interfaces within the Smart Logistics System since 2018. The company’s products and services are offered in 46 European countries and in 24 languages.

== History ==
It was founded in 1997 as TimoCom Soft- und Hardware GmbH by the entrepreneurs Jens Thiermann and Jürgen Moorbrink as well as the software developers Gunther Matzaitis and Oliver Schubert in Düsseldorf. The first part of the company name, "Timo", was created from the first letters of the two first-mentioned founders. The company presented the freight and vehicle exchange TC Truck&Cargo as its first product which enabled users to provide freight or transport vehicles digitally and avoid cost-intensive empty runs.

TIMOCOM extended its offering in the years that followed to an extensive transport platform. Amongst others, applications for cost calculation, route planning, vehicle tracking, assigning storage spaces, and long-term transport tenders were developed.

TIMOCOM went online in 2006 and enabled users to place offers in real time. This step changed the processes of logistics companies extensively in Europe.

Because hundreds of thousands of offers were placed on the TIMOCOM transport platform daily, the decision was taken to provide the relationship of supply and demand as a new online service in 2009. The transport barometer is now used by many companies as a controlling factor for their pricing.

The company head office was relocated to Erkrath in 2014. A second building complex was added in 2017.

Jens Thiermann handed over the operational management to his son Tim Thiermann, Managing Partner, in 2019. Since then, he has managed the company alongside Sebastian Lehnen, a member of the Executive Board.

== Products ==
Road Freight Marketplace The Road Freight Marketplace combines different applications for the digital support of transport processes with a logistics network consisting of more than 58,000 certified companies all over Europe. The Road Freight Marketplace can be connected with existing logistics and telematics systems via individual interfaces. The system also offers various services.

Applications

- Freight and vehicle exchange (freight exchange)
- Warehouse
- Transport orders
- Quote requests
- Tenders
- Tracking of trucks and shipments
- Routes & costs
- Company profiles

Interfaces

- Freight exchange
- Transport orders
- Tracking
- Shipment Tracking
- Company Profiles
- Freight Price Insights

Services

- Security net
- International debt collection service
- TIMOCOM AI
- Transport Barometer
