= Postes, Télégraphes et Téléphones =

French communications company (1879-1991)

- Company type: Government-owned company
- Industry: Communications
- Founded: 1879 (146 years ago), Paris
- Defunct: 1991 (34 years ago)
- Successor: La Poste, Orange
- Headquarters: France

Postes, Télégraphes et Téléphones (French pronunciation: [pɔst teleɡʁaf e telefɔn]), also known as P&T, P et T and PTT, was the French administration of postal services and telecommunications, founded in 1879 during the Third Republic.

The French PTT pioneered the virtual circuit variant of packet switching in the early 1970s through the work of Rémi Després.

The company rolled out Minitel, a Videotex online service accessible through telephone lines, experimentally between July 1980 in Saint-Malo, France, and from autumn 1980 in other areas, and introduced it commercially throughout France in 1982. Minitel was the world's most successful online service prior to the World Wide Web.

The name Postes, Télécommunication et Télédiffusion never received official recognition from the French state. It was above all used in French campaigns, in unofficial texts and in film credits. In effect, Télédiffusion, which grouped together television and radio channels, was always independent.

It was divided in 1991 into France Télécom and La Poste.

== See also ==
- Internet in France
- Protocol Wars
