= Cargofy =

- Type: Private
- Industry: Logistics technology; artificial intelligence
- Founded: 2017; 9 years ago
- Products: AI agents for logistics operations
- Parent: Forward Group
- Website: cargofy.com

Cargofy is a Ukrainian-American logistics technology firm that develops AI agents for shippers, freight brokers, carriers and third-party logistics providers. Cargofy describes these agents as "digital workers", software agents designed to execute multi-step logistics workflows across connected communication and transportation systems. They integrate with existing logistics and communication systems to automate workflows including freight procurement, tendering, dispatch, shipment tracking, document processing, billing and compliance. Cargofy was founded in 2017.

== History ==
The company was founded as Cargofy by Stakh Vozniak, Oleksandr Kovalchuk and Dimitris Alexiou in 2017. That year, Cargofy entered the United States market through participation in the Iowa Startup Accelerator programme, which was operated by the NewBoCo organization in Cedar Rapids, Iowa.

In its first year after launching in the United States, Cargofy generated $2.7 million in revenue. In 2018, it was ranked among the top 1,000 companies in the Inc. 5000 list of the fastest-growing private companies in the United States, reporting growth of more than 600% over the previous three years.

By 2018, Cargofy's product included an AI virtual assistant that helped independent truck drivers find freight loads and manage trips.

In February 2022, Cargofy raised $2 million in a seed round led by JKR Investments Group, with participation from Flyer One Ventures and angel investors. Following the start of the full-scale Russian invasion of Ukraine, Cargofy launched Pomich (Ukrainian: «Поміч», meaning "Help"), a platform for coordinating humanitarian deliveries by connecting transportation requests with carriers.

In 2022, Cargofy expanded its AI capabilities to support more complex logistics operations and developed a digital workforce for additional workflows. During 2022 and 2023, the company expanded the platform to serve shippers, carriers and third-party logistics providers, integrating freight procurement, dispatch and fleet management into a digital workspace.

By June 2026, the company reported 2,000 paying customers. In the same month, Cargofy announced an $11 million Series A round, comprising $6 million in primary capital and $5 million in secondary transactions, led by u.ventures, Toloka VC and Movens Capital with participation from Des Traynor and other investors. Following the Series A, Cargofy was valued at approximately $50 million.

== Platform and technology ==
The company's initial product was an AI truck dispatcher for independent truck drivers, helping them find freight loads, plan routes, and locate nearby fuel stations, parking areas, and repair facilities.

Cargofy later expanded its technology into digital workers for logistics operations. The agents are configured for individual customer workflows and are designed to operate within the systems already used by logistics teams rather than replace transportation management systems (TMS), enterprise resource planning (ERP) systems or other core software. The agents connect to communication and logistics channels including email, telephone, messaging applications, customer and carrier portals, TMS and ERP systems, load boards and compliance systems. They can execute workflows spanning quotation, freight procurement, dispatch, shipment tracking, documentation, billing and compliance.

The platform has more than 70 integrations with logistics and business systems and supports approximately 28 languages. Its digital workers perform tasks such as obtaining and comparing freight quotes, sourcing and booking loads, communicating with carriers and customers, coordinating dispatch, tracking shipments, processing documents and handling billing and compliance-related workflows.

According to Cargofy, a 315-truck fleet using its platform saves about $83,000 per month.

== Customers and markets ==
Cargofy serves shippers, carriers and third-party logistics providers. For shippers, the platform supports freight procurement, tendering, quotes, carrier coordination and shipment tracking. For carriers, it supports finding and booking loads, dispatch coordination, shipment tracking and communication with brokers and shippers. For freight brokers and third-party logistics providers, it supports requests for quotation, carrier sourcing, dispatch coordination, shipment tracking and communication with customers and carriers.

Customer-specific workflows are configured on a common platform with shared integrations and carrier connectivity. Cargofy operates across North America, Europe, Ukraine and Central Asia, including the Trans-Caspian region, with operational hubs in Houston, Warsaw, Kyiv and Baku. The company planned to expand its hub network to Germany, the Netherlands, France, Spain and additional regions of the United States, while also targeting Brazil, Mexico and the Middle East. The company has publicly identified clients including SuuS, Nova Group, Kaspi, Zammler, Metinvest, Vista and Aurora.

== Recognition ==
In 2018, Cargofy was included in Inc. magazine's Inc. 5000 list of the fastest-growing private companies in the United States. In August 2018, Cargofy was selected as a "Top Pick" in the Mobility category at the TechCrunch Disrupt conference in San Francisco.

Forbes Ukraine named Cargofy among 25 Ukrainian startups with billion-dollar potential.

== See also ==
- Trucking industry in the United States
- Startups in Ukraine
