= Beltel =

Defunct videotex service in South Africa

Beltel was the name and trademark used by the South African Department of Posts and Telecommunications (later Telkom) for its Videotex system between the mid eighties and 1999.

The system used telephone lines and modems connected to personal computers or to dumb terminals which had built in modems.

The system incorporated a billing system which enabled information providers and service providers to receive payment for information and services provided to users. The billing system was capable of handling very small transactions, and referred to as Micro-billing. Today all of the functionality of the Beltel system, and more, is delivered by handheld mobile phones or cellphones and PDAs which utilize mobile payment.

Booklets/Magazines: What is BELTEL? BELTEL user manual. (Setting up, Facilities, Passwords, Logging off, Mail, Commands) Videotex SA Beltel. (Various business services for its 14,000 users) (In 1990) BELTEL as a business tool The BELTEL post box. Telematics: (News, views, reviews and adverts) (Seasonal)

Beltel provided many online services such as: Debates, competitions, prizes. Banking: Allied Bank, First National Bank, Nedbank, Standard Bank, Trust bank, United Bank, Volkskas Bank

Credit Checking: National Credit Bureau

Message Handling: Beltel e-Mail, Interlink, Telkom 400

Agriculture Agritel Fresh Produce, Agritel Meat Service, Boere-Data, Mielieraad

Directories: INNOBEL, Electronic Yellow Pages

Entertainment: Bel-Base, Elmdene SA, Playworld, Times Media

Chatlines: FROGG, Intercom

News/Weather: Agritel, Bel-Base, Elmdene SA, Times Media

Classifieds: Bel-Base, CDS Classifieds, Junk Mail

Real Estate: MLS - Multi Listing Service (Real Estate property listing service for Estate Agents)
