= Freight exchange =

Online service for freight companies

A freight exchange or load board is an online service for haulage companies, logistics providers, freight forwarders, transport companies and (in some cases) private customers. It allows haulage companies to search a database of available freight that needs to be delivered and advertise their available vehicle capacity.

Logistics providers and freight forwarders can advertise their freight loads that need delivering and also match their freight loads to the available vehicle capacity. Most freight exchanges focus on road transport with trucks, but there are similar services for sea and air freight.

== Operation of a Freight exchange ==
Freight exchanges provide a platform that allows carriers to communicate freight traffic information to fellow operators such as transporters, forwarders and logistics companies. They allow forwarders to advertise their freight either privately or publicly to a large number of freight operators that are looking for loads. They also allow freight operators to offer vehicle space. Online systems are often subscription-based with a small charge for advertising (posting) and searching (consulting). Some freight exchanges operate without monthly fees. They charge transport providers only a success fee, which is payable when the quote is accepted.

The main purpose of a freight exchange is to fill empty vehicles on their return journeys (when they are on their way back to their depot after a delivery) by matching them to available freight.

For example, a trucker has an order to transport tulips from Keukenhof in the Netherlands to Como, Italy. Ideally, a freight order for the return trip would increase profitability, so the trucker would search for return freight or return load on a freight exchange.

Finding return loads results in improved efficiency for haulage and transport companies as well as helping cut down on empty journeys, which reduces CO_{2} emissions. Transport is responsible for 25% of global emissions of greenhouse gases (including CO_{2}) in the European Union. Around 24% of road freight journeys in the UK were empty in 2019.

== History and new developments ==
The world's first electronic freight exchange was called Teleroute and was launched in France on the Minitel system in 1985. Before the Internet, users were supplied with a terminal to advertise or search for freight. Today, there are many examples around the world offering many services to haulers and freight forwarders.

The classic freight exchange was a favorite tool in centralized economies. For example, there was a ban on driving with an empty truck in socialist Czechoslovakia. Transport companies had to use the national system showing information about available loads.

With the help of technology, freight exchanges are now able to improve efficiency even further by integrating with telematics and transport management systems to offer real-time freight load matching utilizing GPS technology.
