= Teleroute =

Teleroute S.A.
- Company type: Public
- Traded as: Euronext: WKL
- Industry: Transport & Logistics
- Founded: 1985; 41 years ago
- Headquarters: Brussels, Belgium
- Products: online Freight Exchange

Teleroute S.A., a former Wolters Kluwer business and since 2017 part of Alpega group, is a pan-European online freight exchange service that offers customized online services for the Transport and Logistics industry. Founded in 1985, as the original online freight and vehicle exchange and headquartered in Brussels, Belgium, Teleroute has operations in 27 European countries.

"With more than 70.000 active users on the platform, Teleroute has gained the trust of big transport companies such as DB Schenker, Malherbe, MKTS transports spéciaux, Neele-Vat Logistics, Nothegger Transport Logistik GmbH, Comfret TTD Ltd and more."

== History ==
Teleroute is an online freight and vehicle exchange and has been active in France and Europe since 1985. With the roll-out of the Minitel technology (3614 Lamy), Teleroute expanded its range of services to include computer-based services and later also a web-based platform.

In 1996, Teleroute, a subsidiary of the Lamy Group, became part of Wolters Kluwer. In 2000, Teleroute was integrated into a new structure for transport IT solutions: Wolters KluwerTransport Services (WKTS).

In 2005, WKTS took over the Nolis freight exchange, which was followed by the merger of the two freight exchanges in 2012. In the early 2010s, the Group decided to significantly expand its range of services in the field of transportation management system (TMS) through the integration of the software solutions Transwide (Charger TMS).

On 30 June 2017, Wolters Kluwer Transport Services was officially taken over by Castik Capital with the aim of creating a leading portfolio of companies in the TMS sector. Since 1 October 2017, WKTS has been operating officially under the name of Alpega.

== Alpega Group ==
Under its current brand name, Alpega has brought together various software solutions: Alpega Group consists of an end to end logistics platform, with the following solutions, TMS (inet logistics and Transwide), TenderEasy (freight procurement), SmartBooking (dock scheduling and booking solution), Wtransnet and Teleroute a European freight exchange, 123cargo(BursaTransport) a freight exchange for Central, Eastern and Southern Europe, and most recently Connecta (a social network-like platform for shippers and carriers to connect).
