= Alex (videotex service) =

Canadian videotex service

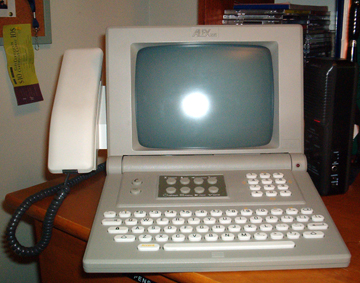
- Alex videotex terminal
- Developer: Northern Telecom
- Type: Videotex
- Launched: December 5, 1988; 37 years ago (Montreal); 1990 (Toronto)
- Discontinued: June 3, 1994; 32 years ago
- Platform: Minitel
- Status: Discontinued
- Members: 32,000 (1991)

Alex was an interactive videotex information service offered by Bell Canada in market research from 1988 to 1990 and thence to the general public until 1994.

The Alextel terminal was based on the French Minitel terminals, built by Northern Telecom and leased to customers for $7.95/month. It consisted of a CRT display, attached keyboard, and a 1200 bit/s modem for use on regular phone lines. In 1991 proprietary software was released for IBM PCs that allowed computer users to access the network. Communications on the Alex network was via DATAPAC X.25 protocol.

The system operated in the same fashion as Minitel, whereby users connected to various content providers over the X.25 network and thus access was normally through a local telephone number. The most popular (and most expensive) sites were chat rooms. Using the service could cost as much as CA$0.3 per minute. Also offered was an electronic white pages and yellow pages directory. Many users terminated their subscription upon receiving their first invoice. One subscriber racked up a monthly fee of over C$2,000 spending most of his online time in chat.

== History ==
The motivation to develop the Alex terminal and online service came from competitive pressure from France's Minitel, which had expanded into the Quebec market in April 1988. Bell Canada quickly organized their own version and received approval from the CRTC to offer the online service as of November 1988. Both services were expensive. A Minitel terminal cost $25 per month to rent or a one-time payment of $600, and $15 per hour of usage on top. An Alextel terminal was $7.95 a month to rent, but services cost up to $40 an hour.

The advent of the World Wide Web contributed to making this service obsolete. On April 29, 1994, Bell Canada sent a letter to its customers announcing that the service would be terminated on June 3, 1994. In that letter, Mr. T.E. Graham, then Director of Business Planning for Bell Advanced Communications, stated that "Quite simply, the ALEX network is not the right vehicle, nor the appropriate technology, at this time to deliver the information goods needed in our fast-paced society."

The Alextel terminal is also usable as a dumb terminal for VT100 emulation.

== See also ==
- Prestel
- Telidon
- Viewdata
- ICON (microcomputer), a computer system used in Ontario schools from 1984 to 1994.
