= Bildschirmtext =

German videotex service

- Bildschirmtext on-screen logo
- Developer: Systems Designers Ltd, Deutsche Bundespost
- Type: Videotex
- Launched: 1983; 43 years ago
- Discontinued: 2001; 25 years ago
- Platform: CEPT1 profile
- Status: Discontinued

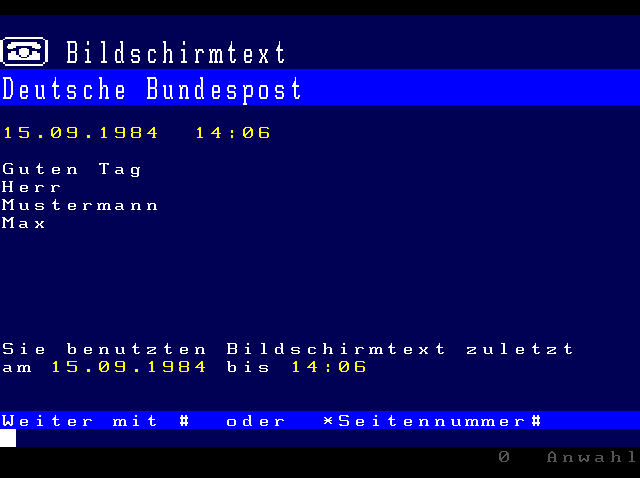
Reconstruction of the Bildschirmtext welcomepage after login

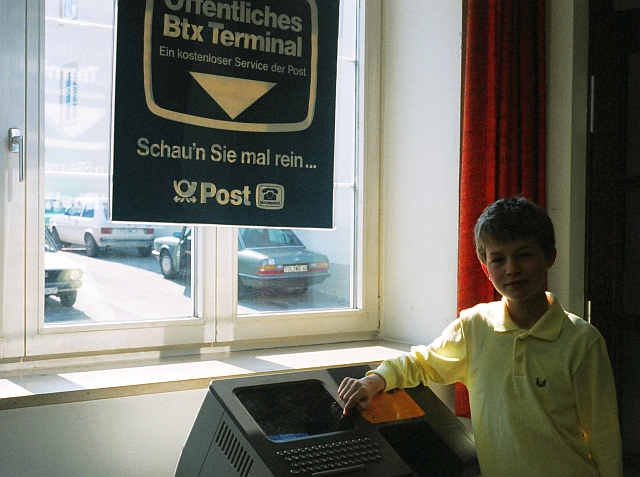
1987 photo of a German youth standing next to a German Post Office Btx terminal

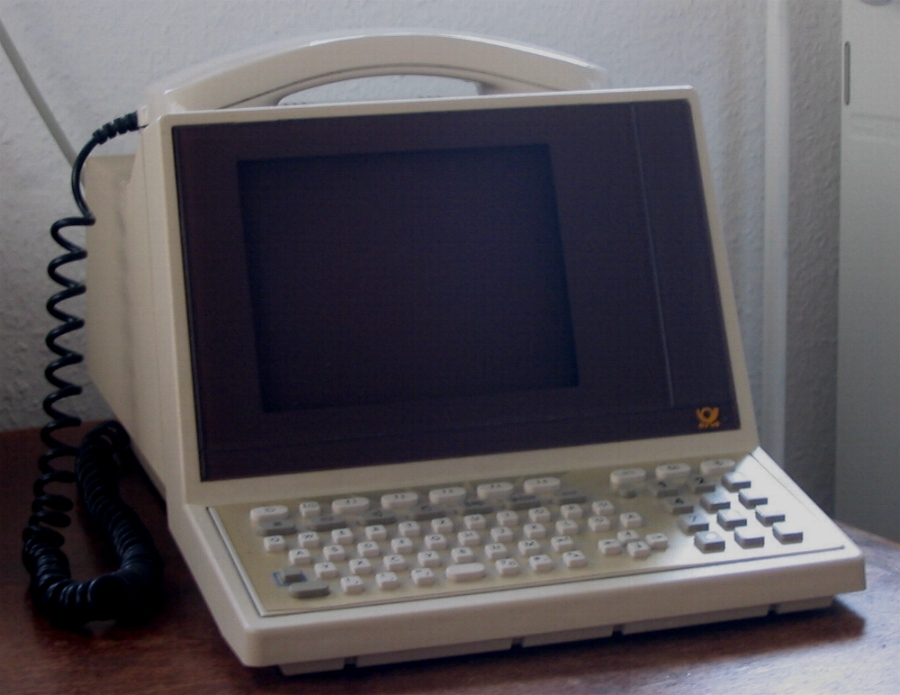
German "Multifunktionales Telefon 12"

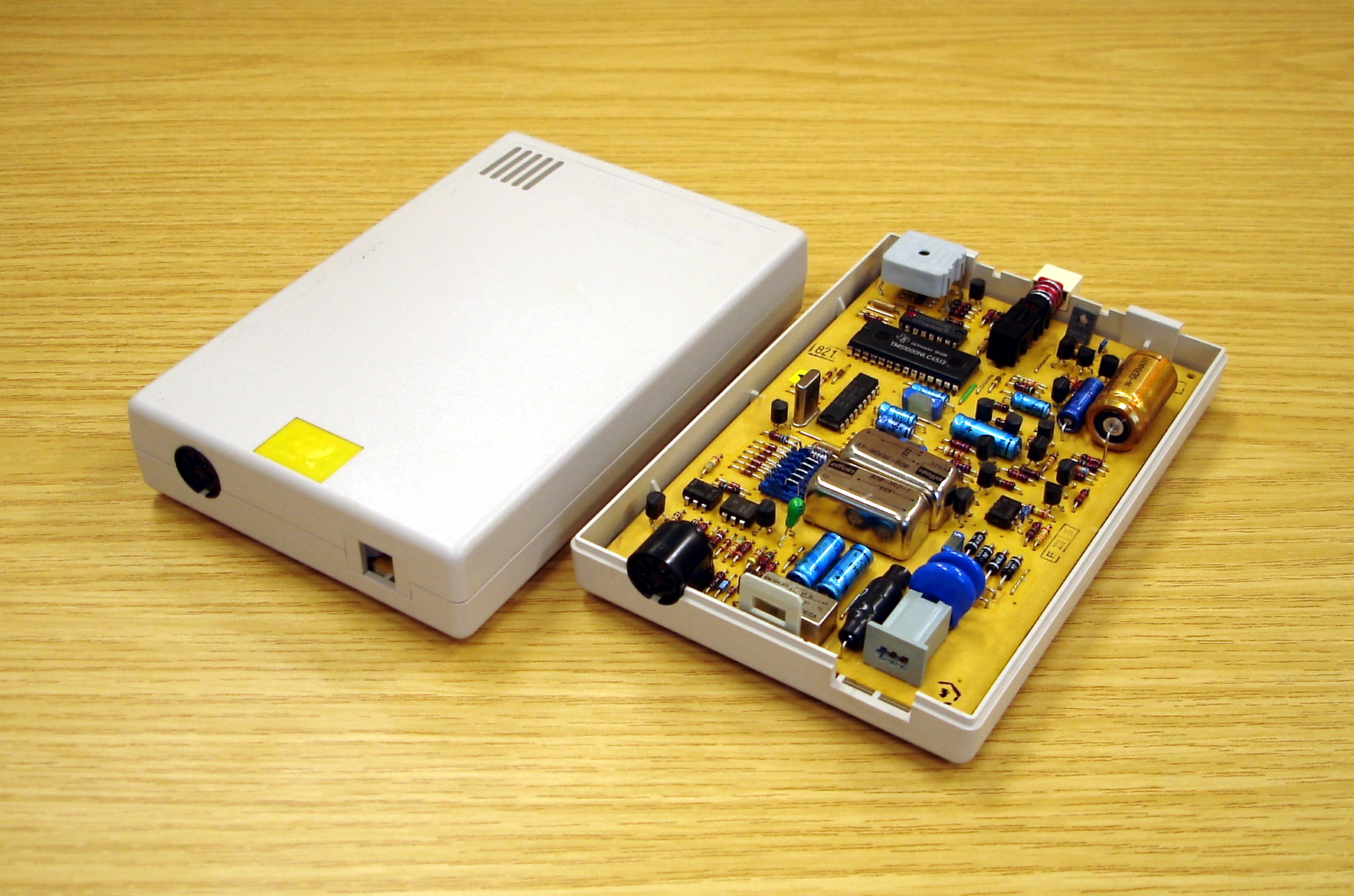
Modem for accessing the Bildschirmtext service

Bildschirmtext (German "screen text", abbrev. Btx or BTX) was an online videotex system launched in West Germany in 1983 by the Deutsche Bundespost, the (West) German postal service.

Btx originally required special hardware (it was based on GEC 4000 series computers) which had to be bought or rented from the British Post Office. The data was transmitted through the telephone network using V.23 modems and the content was displayed on a television set.

== History ==
Originally conceived to follow the UK Prestel specifications, and developed on contract by a small UK company called Systems Designers Ltd (originally merged into EDS and now part of HP) for IBM Germany. Btx added a number of additional features before launch, including some inspired by the French Minitel service, to create a new display standard of its own, which in 1981 was designated the CEPT1 profile.

The system was presented at the IFA in Berlin, with a trial system installed in Düsseldorf and Berlin in 1980. In 1981, the system was expanded to rest of Germany, with the necessary network being developed by IBM. The system was launched nationwide in 1983, at the press of a button by the Federal Post Minister at Berlin's IFA The service could only be used with a modem produced by the Bundespost and user uptake was low.

The "MultiTel" devices could operate without a TV and allowed simultaneous telephone operation. By 1986, there were also adaptor devices for home computers like the Commodore 64 (ex: Siemens Decoder Module II).

By the 1990s, the system was renamed "Datex-J" and focused on the home users.

In 1995, an enhanced backward-compatible standard called Kernel for Intelligent Communication Terminals (KIT) was announced, but this never really gained acceptance. Btx formed the basis of T-Online, Deutsche Telekom's online service, which maintained a Btx interface in its access software after the T-Online brand was introduced in 1995.

After German reunification, Btx was available throughout Germany. Btx was also available in Austria and Switzerland, where it was called Videotex (VTX).

The last Btx access was switched off at the end of 2001 by Deutsche Telekom; it had been made obsolete by the Internet.

== Operation ==
Btx permits the transmission of graphical pages with a resolution of 480 by 250 pixels, where 32 out of a palette of 4096 colors could be shown at the same time. Each page could display 40×24 semigraphic text characters. This corresponds to the technical possibilities of the early 1980s.

Btx always transferred whole screen pages; the receiver paid per received page. The content provider was free to set the price, and could require either a fee per page (0.01 DM to 9.99 DM), or a time-dependent fee (0.01 DM to 1.30 DM per minute).

Data was transferred unauthenticated and in plaintext, leading to the BTX hack by Wau Holland in 1984.

== In Media ==
Bildschirmtext is referenced in the German language version of the song "Computerliebe" by Kraftwerk. The song's lyrics, "Ich wähl die Nummer, ich wähl die Nummer / Rufe Bildschirmtext, rufe Bildschirmtext" ("I call this number, I call this number / Call Bildschirmtext, call Bildschirmtext"), reference the service as it was in 1981.
