= Smart port =

Seaport with automated, digitalized systems

A smart port is most often defined by being a technologically advanced seaport that integrates digitalization, automation, and data-driven solutions to optimize logistics, improve efficiency, enhance security, and reduce environmental impact. It uses technologies like IoT, AI, big data, and blockchain to streamline operations, monitor cargo movements, and improve decision-making in real-time.

A smart port equips the workforce with relevant skills and technology to solve the unique internal and external challenges of the organisation, and to facilitate the efficient movement of goods, delivery of services and smooth flow of information. Using a holistic approach, the smart port achieves results without creating new challenges internally or elsewhere in the supply chain eco-system.

== Background ==
The smart port minimises the negative impacts of its activities on the natural environment and enhances the surrounding communities - economically and socially.

The material benefits of chosen technologies allow the smart port to:

- Improve efficiency to gain competitive advantage
- Increase business resilience to economic shocks or disruptive forces
- Extract maximum value from physical assets
- Develop new revenue streams based on digital value propositions
- Increase employee engagement and wellbeing
- Achieve and exceed environmental commitments

A smart port is not defined by the use of any one particular technology or concept.

=== Concept ===
Smart ports employ smart technology solutions to increase efficiency, effectiveness and security by making ports more environmentally sustainable, economically efficient and capable of handling increased port traffic.

=== Efficiency ===
Due to the increasing size and volume of container, transport and cruise ships, ports continue to face new challenges with daily traffic and processing. Technologies such as IoT can improve warehouse logistics, inventory management etc. and help automate loading, dispatching and transporting goods.

In smart ports, parking spaces could be optimised and traffic streamlined by making more efficient use of limited space. Sensors, cameras, drones and other technologies can automatically collect and share information such as weather, traffic and pollution data for port owners and customers. Optimizing workflow could double capacity without having to additional space or having to invest in new infrastructure and equipment, while simultaneously reducing operation costs. Making a port "smart" not only means digitally connecting everything inside the port, but also requires multilevel cooperation among government authorities, businesses, local communities and other relevant parties.

Shared data from smart ports also requires standardisation so that it could be better utilised by people in different countries and locations. The latest information from international business intelligence provider Visiongain, assesses that Smart Ports Market spending will reach $1.5 bn in 2019. A smart port takes complete advantage of space, produces higher revenues, saves natural resources and benefits from the technology accessible to the logistics community.

Artificial intelligence could assist with security checks and automated screening processes, not only helping to standardise and lower the durations of those tasks, but also making them safer, more reliable and less dependent on human failure.

=== Economics ===
In order to remain economically competitive, ports need to efficiently streamline workflow and minimise costs. If the optimal traffic flow for ships can be determined automatically, the cargo loading and unloading times can be optimised to save time so that more ships and cargo can be cleared in less time. Local natural resources such as petroleum can also serve as incentives for port development, leading to long-term trade and economic development for an entire area. At the same time, as automation is potentially able to lower overhead and costs, smart ports can become less financially dependent on political authorities, allowing increased flexibility for private investments and improvements.

=== Environmental sustainability ===
Ports have historically suffered from high levels of environmental pollution. However, smart ports can limit energy consumption and waste by making use of automation and smart technologies. Hamburg, for example, has a system of sensors, cameras and smart lights on roads to help monitor and direct traffic, which can help to optimize traffic and thus lower emissions. These large public infrastructural development projects typically require significant cooperation from various agencies and government authorities.

== Development and innovation ==
Ports have always served an important function for the transfer of goods. Before the Industrial Revolution, ports had functioned as trade centers and marketplaces that would develop into centers for cross-cultural exchange, social development and demographic settlement.

In the 21st century, as ports merge with big data, artificial intelligence and IoT, the port is beginning to be seen as an interconnected smart environment bringing together different port sectors and even other ports. The whole supply chain is integrated while making autonomous, intelligent choices.

To help build a network of highly connected and technologically advanced smart ports all over the world, the Hamburg Port Authority started the chainPORT initiative in collaboration with ports like Los Angeles, Montreal, Rotterdam, Antwerp, Barcelona, Felixstowe, Singapore and Busan, to share and disseminate the concept of smart ports.

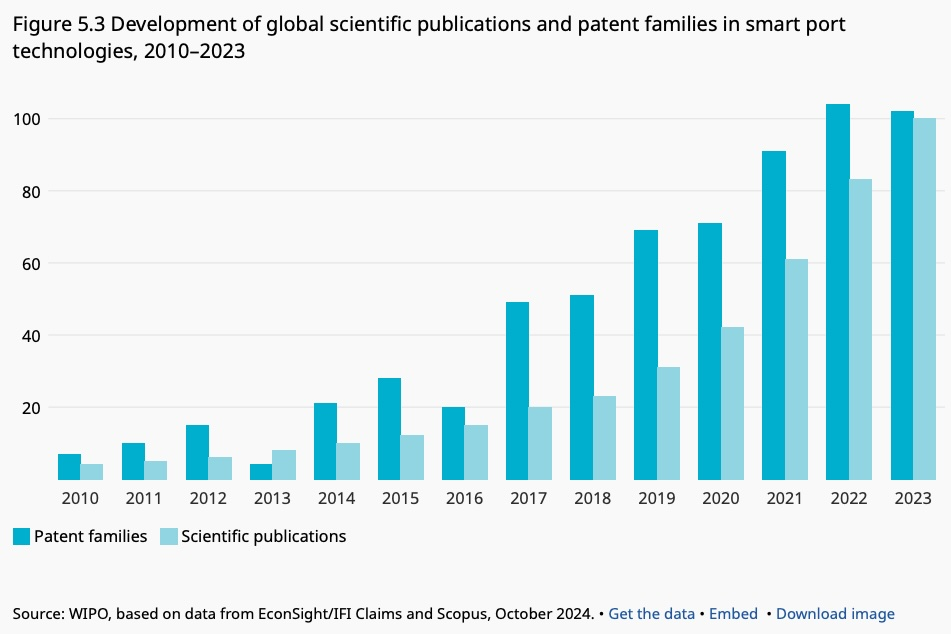
Global scientific publications and patent families in smart port technologies have steadily increased between 2010 and 2023

The maritime industry has been testing blockchain technology since 2017 and several shipping companies have partnered with tech companies to create blockchain shipping systems to improve maritime logistics.

IBM has tested the Blockchain technology in Customs Declaration (CusDec) submission. Delays happen in customs declaration submission and border clearing could be minimised if the industry is ready to practice IBM's initiative.

According to 2024 WIPO Technology trends future of transportation report, the scientific community's engagement with smart ports has seen a noticeable uptick in research activity. Since 2016, there has been a marked increase in peer-reviewed journal articles focusing on various aspects of smart port technologies. Besides, the number of published patent families has increased from only 20 in 2016 to over 100 in 2023.

== Criticisms ==
Since smart ports would have to deal with big data and operate using surveillance, data privacy and security are potential areas of concern. Concerns include questions of who will have access to the data, and how networks can be protected from hacking and sabotage. Others criticise the term "smart" as frequently overused and exaggerated by IoT advocates for marketing purposes, while a truly "smart" environment should be able to learn and interact.

A port ecosystem consists of multiple parties that take on a diverse range of tasks and responsibilities, with each party having different priorities for port development. Currently, the smart port approach is frequently being promoted by port authorities. However, successfully developing a smart port requires a more holistic multi-stakeholder approach that would require large-scale cooperation on many different levels. Another problem with automation is the mass replacement of human workers, which has already led to protests in places such as the Port of Los Angeles.

Some governments have to focus more on providing jobs rather than focusing on smart solutions when the port operation is done by the government. Automation also cannot be utilised to its full potential if there is a lack of basic infrastructures, such as when there is insufficient capacity for containers or inadequate port area size. In such circumstances, the real cost of implementing smart port technologies can actually outweigh the benefits. Further, smart solutions are highly capital intensive. This may not be affordable for every port.

== See also ==
- Intelligent transportation system
- Intermodal freight transport
- Smart city
- Smart highway
- Smart grid
- Smart environment
- Ubiquitous computing
- Intelligent maintenance system
- Supply chain management
- LoRaWAN
