= Videotex =

End-user information system

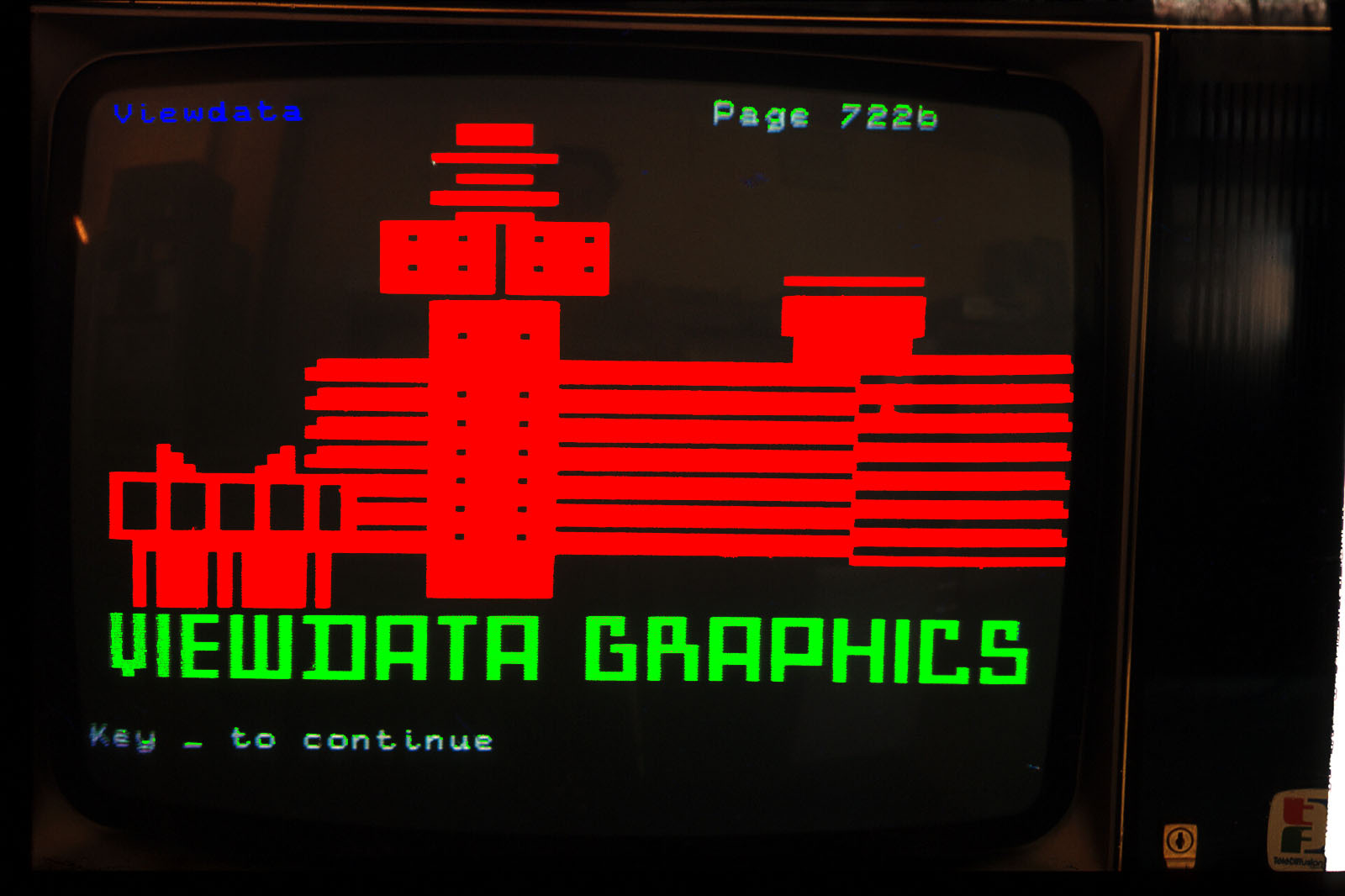
Videotex example screen showing its graphics capabilities, 1978. As in teletext, predefined, fixed-width graphics characters in multiple colors could be used to create an image.

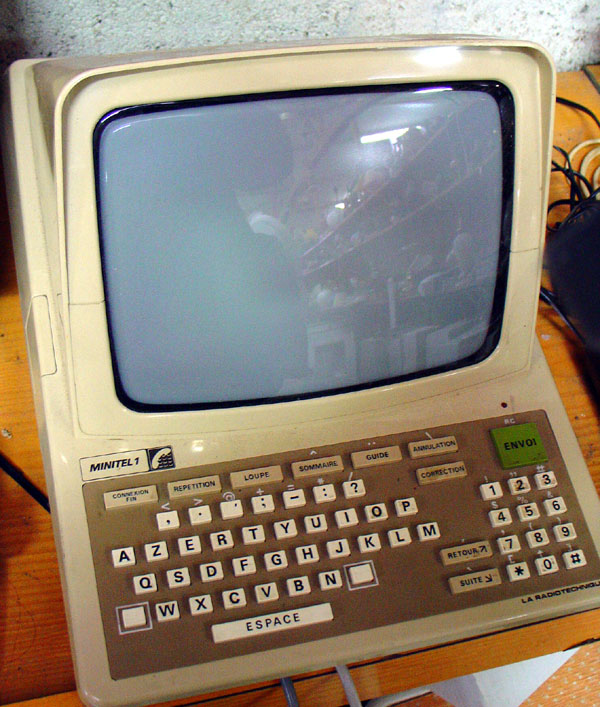
Minitel was perhaps the most successful videotex service worldwide, using this terminal, c. 1982.

Videotex (or interactive videotex) was one of the earliest implementations of an end-user information system. From the late 1970s to early 2010s, it was used to deliver information (usually pages of text) to a user in computer-like format, typically to be displayed on a television or a dumb terminal.

In a strict definition, videotex is any system that provides interactive content and displays it on a video monitor such as a television, typically using modems to send data in both directions. A close relative is teletext, which sends data in one direction only, typically encoded in a television signal. All such systems are occasionally referred to as viewdata. Unlike the modern Internet, traditional videotex services were highly centralized.

Videotex in its broader definition can be used to refer to any such service, including teletext, the Internet, bulletin board systems, online service providers, and even the arrival/departure displays at an airport. This usage is no longer common.

With the exception of Minitel in France, videotex elsewhere never managed to attract any more than a very small percentage of the universal mass market once envisaged. By the end of the 1980s its use was essentially limited to a few niche applications.

== Initial development and technologies ==
=== United Kingdom ===
The first attempts at a general-purpose videotex service were created in the United Kingdom in the late 1960s. In about 1970 the BBC had a brainstorming session in which it was decided to start researching ways to send closed captioning information to the audience. As the Teledata research continued the BBC became interested in using the system for delivering any sort of information, not just closed captioning. In 1972, the concept was first made public under the new name Ceefax. Meanwhile, the General Post Office (soon to become British Telecom) had been researching a similar concept since the late 1960s, known as Viewdata. Unlike Ceefax which was a one-way service carried in the existing TV signal, Viewdata was a two-way system using telephones. Since the Post Office owned the telephones, this was considered to be an excellent way to drive more customers to use the phones. Not to be outdone by the BBC, they also announced their service, under the name Prestel. ITV soon joined the fray with a Ceefax-clone known as ORACLE.

In 1974, all the services agreed on a standard for displaying the information. The display would be a simple 40×24 grid of text, with some "graphics characters" for constructing simple graphics, revised and finalized in 1976. The standard did not define the delivery system, so both Viewdata-like and Teledata-like services could at least share the TV-side hardware, which was expensive at the time. The standard also introduced a new term that covered all such services, teletext. Ceefax first started operation in 1974 with a limited 30 pages, followed quickly by ORACLE and then Prestel in 1979.

By 1981, Prestel International was available in nine countries, and a number of countries, including Sweden, The Netherlands, Finland and West Germany were developing their own national systems closely based on Prestel. General Telephone and Electronics (GTE) acquired an exclusive agency for the system for North America.

In the early 1980s, videotex became the base technology for the London Stock Exchange's pricing service called TOPIC. Later versions of TOPIC, notably TOPIC2 and TOPIC3, were developed by Thanos Vassilakis and introduced trading and historic price feeds.

=== France ===
Development of a French teletext-like system began in 1973. A very simple 2-way videotex system called Tictac was also demonstrated in the mid-1970s. As in the UK, this led on to work to develop a common display standard for videotex and teletext, called Antiope, which was finalised in 1977. Antiope had similar capabilities to the UK system for displaying alphanumeric text and chunky "mosaic" character-based block graphics. A difference however was that while in the UK standard control codes automatically also occupied one character position on screen, Antiope allowed for "non spacing" control codes. This gave Antiope slightly more flexibility in the use of colours in mosaic block graphics, and in presenting the accents and diacritics of the French language.

Meanwhile, spurred on by the 1978 Nora/Minc report, the French government was determined to catch up on a perceived falling behind in its computer and communications facilities. In 1980 it began field trials issuing Antiope-based terminals for free to over 250,000 telephone subscribers in Ille-et-Vilaine region, where the French CCETT research centre was based, for use as telephone directories. The trial was a success, and in 1982 Minitel was rolled out nationwide.

=== Canada ===
Since 1970, researchers at the Communications Research Centre (CRC) in Ottawa had been working on a set of "picture description instructions", which encoded graphics commands as a text stream. Graphics were encoded as a series of instructions (graphics primitives) each represented by a single ASCII character. Graphic coordinates were encoded in multiple 6 bit strings of XY coordinate data, flagged to place them in the printable ASCII range so that they could be transmitted with conventional text transmission techniques. ASCII SI/SO characters were used to differentiate the text from graphic portions of a transmitted "page". In 1975, the CRC gave a contract to Norpak to develop an interactive graphics terminal that could decode the instructions and display them on a colour display, which was successfully up and running by 1977.

Against the background of the developments in Europe, CRC was able to persuade the Canadian government to develop the system into a fully-fledged service. In August 1978, the Canadian Department of Communications publicly launched it as Telidon, a "second generation" videotex/teletext service, and committed to a four-year development plan to encourage rollout. Compared to the European systems, Telidon offered real graphics, as opposed to block-mosaic character graphics. The downside was that it required much more advanced decoders, typically featuring Zilog Z80 or Motorola 6809 processors.

=== Japan ===
Research in Japan was shaped by the demands of the large number of Kanji characters used in Japanese script. With 1970s technology, the ability to generate so many characters on demand in the end-user's terminal was seen as prohibitive. Instead, development focussed on methods to send pages to user terminals pre-rendered, using coding strategies similar to facsimile machines. This led to a videotex system called Captain ("Character and Pattern Telephone Access Information Network"), created by NTT in 1978, which went into full trials from 1979 to 1981. The system also lent itself naturally to photographic images, albeit at only moderate resolution. However, the pages typically took two or three times longer to load, compared to the European systems. NHK developed an experimental teletext system along similar lines, called CIBS ("Character Information Broadcasting Station"). Based on a 388×200 pixel resolution, it was first announced in 1976, and began trials in late 1978. (NHK's ultimate production teletext system launched in 1983).

== Standards ==
Work to establish an international standard for videotex began in 1978 in CCITT. But the national delegations showed little interest in compromise, each hoping that their system would come to define what was perceived to be going to be an enormous new mass-market. In 1980 CCITT therefore issued recommendation S.100 (later T.100), noting the points of similarity but the essential incompatibility of the systems, and declaring all four to be recognised options.

Trying to kick-start the market, AT&T Corporation entered the fray, and in May 1981 announced its own Presentation Layer Protocol (PLP). This was closely based on the Canadian Telidon system, but added to it some further graphics primitives and a syntax for defining macros, algorithms to define cleaner pixel spacing for the (arbitrarily sizeable) text, and also dynamically redefinable characters and a mosaic block graphic character set, so that it could reproduce content from the French Antiope. After some further revisions this was adopted in 1983 as ANSI standard X3.110, more commonly called NAPLPS, the North American Presentation Layer Protocol Syntax. It was also adopted in 1988 as the presentation-layer syntax for NABTS, the North American Broadcast Teletext Specification.

Meanwhile, the European national Postal Telephone and Telegraph (PTT) agencies were also increasingly interested in videotex, and had convened discussions in European Conference of Postal and Telecommunications Administrations (CEPT) to co-ordinate developments, which had been diverging along national lines. As well as the British and French standards, the Swedes had proposed extending the British Prestel standard with a new set of smoother mosaic graphics characters; while the specification for the proposed German Bildschirmtext (BTX) system, developed under contract by IBM Germany for Deutsche Bundespost, was growing increasingly baroque. Originally conceived to follow the UK Prestel system, it had accreted elements from all the other European standards and more. This became the basis for setting out the CEPT recommendation T/CD 06–01, also proposed in May 1981.

However, due to national pressure, CEPT stopped short of fixing a single standard, and instead recognised four "profiles":

- CEPT1, corresponding to the German BTX;
- CEPT2, the French Minitel;
- CEPT3, the British Prestel;
- CEPT4, the Swedish Prestel Plus.

National videotex services were encouraged to follow one of the existing four basic profiles; or if they extended them, to do so in ways compatible with a "harmonised enhanced" specification. There was talk of upgrading Prestel to the full CEPT standard "within a couple of years". But in the event, it never happened. The German BTX eventually established CEPT1; the French Minitel continued with CEPT2, which was ready to roll out; and the British stayed with CEPT3, by now too established to break compatibility.

The other countries of Europe adopted a patchwork of the different profiles.

In later years, CEPT fixed a number of standards for extension levels to the basic service: for photographic images (based on JPEG; T/TE 06–01, later revisions), for alpha-geometric graphics, similar to NAPLPS/Telidon (T/TE 06–02), for transferring larger data files and software (T/TE 06–03), for active terminal-side capabilities and scripting (T/TE 06–04), and for discovery of terminal capabilities (T/TE 06–05). But interest in them was limited.

CCITT T.101

== Character set ==
ISO-IR registered character sets for Videotex use include variants of T.51, semigraphic mosaic sets, specialised C0 control codes, and four sets of specialised C1 control codes.

== Uptake ==
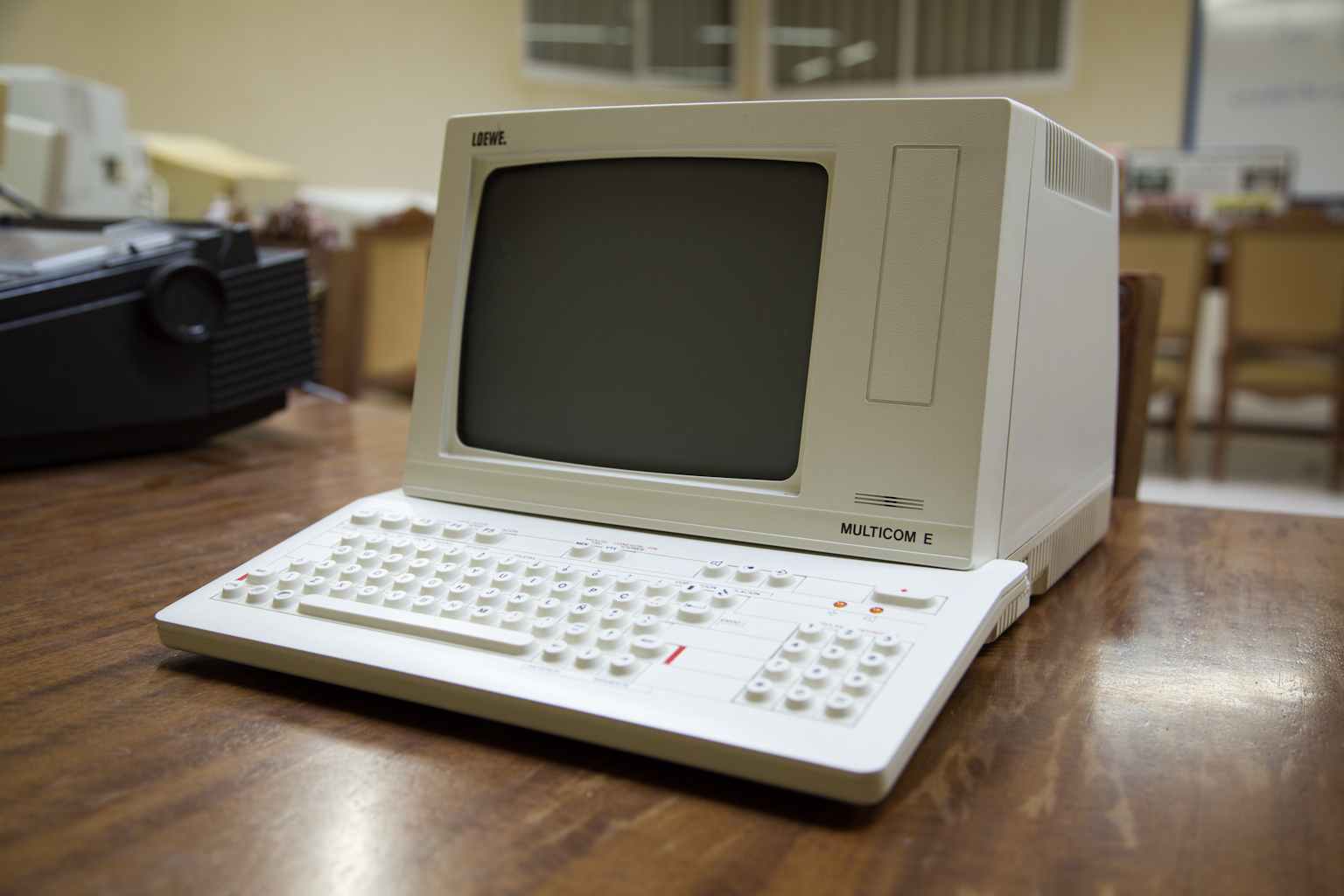
Loewe Multicom E, a late 1980s videotex terminal

=== United Kingdom ===
Prestel was somewhat popular for a time, but never gained anywhere near the popularity of Ceefax. This may have been due primarily to the relatively low penetration of suitable hardware in British homes, requiring the user to pay for the terminal (today referred to as a set-top box), a monthly charge for the service, and phone bills on top of that (unlike the US, local calls were paid for in most of Europe at that time). In the late 1980s the system was re-focused as a provider of financial data, and eventually bought out by the Financial Times in 1994. It continues today in name only, as FT's information service. A closed access videotex system based on the Prestel model was developed by the travel industry, and continues to be almost universally used by travel agents throughout the country.

Using a prototype domestic television equipped with the Prestel chip set, Michael Aldrich of Redifon Computers Ltd demonstrated a real-time transaction processing in 1979; the idea is currently referred to as online shopping. Starting in 1980, he designed, sold and installed systems with major UK companies including the world's first travel industry system, the world's first vehicle locator system for one of the world's largest auto manufacturers and the world's first supermarket system. He wrote a book about his ideas and systems which among other topics explored a future of online shopping and remote working that has proven to be prophetic. Before the IBM PC, Microsoft MS-DOS and the Internet or World Wide Web, he invented and manufactured and sold the 'Teleputer' , a PC that communicated using its Prestel chip set.

The Teleputer was a range of computers that were suffixed with a number. Only the Teleputer 1 and Teleputer 3 were manufactured and sold. The Teleputer 1 was a very simple device and only worked as a teletex terminal, whereas the Teleputer 3 was a Z80 based microcomputer. It ran with a pair of single sided 5 1/4 inch floppy disk drive; a 20Mb Hard disk drive version was available towards the end of the product's life. The operating system was CP/M or a proprietary variant CP*, and the unit was supplied with a suite of applications, consisting of a word processor, spreadsheet, database and a semi-compiled basic programming language. The display supplied with the unit (both the Teleputer 1 and 3) was a modified Rediffusion 14 inch portable colour television, with the tuner circuitry removed and being driven by a RGB input. The unit had a 64Kb onboard memory which could be expanded to 128Kb with a plug in card. Graphics were the standard videotext (or teletext) resolution and colour, but a high resolution graphic card was also available. A 75/1200 baud modem was fitted as standard (could also run at 300/300 and 1200/1200), and connected to the telephone via an old style round telephone connector. In addition an IEEE interface card could be fitted. On the back of the unit there was a RS-232 and Centronics connections and on the front was the connector for the keyboard.

The proposed Teleputer 4 & 5 were planned to have a laser disk attached and would allow the units to control video output on a separate screen.

=== Spain ===
In Spain the system was provided by the Telefónica company and called Ibertex, which was adopted from the French Minitel system, but using the German CEPT-1 standard, used in the German Bildschirmtext.

=== Canada ===
In Canada, the Department of Communications started a lengthy development program in the late 1970s that led to a graphical "second generation" service known as Telidon. Telidon was able to deliver service using the vertical blanking interval of a TV signal or completely by telephone using a Bell 202 style (split baud rate 150/1200) modem. The TV signal was used in a similar fashion to Ceefax, but used more of the available signal (due to differences in the signals between North America and Europe) for a data rate about 1200-bit/s. Some TV signal systems used a low-speed modem on the phone line for menu operation. The resulting system was rolled out in several test studies, all of which were failures.

The use of the 202 model modem, rather than one compatible with the existing DATAPAC dial-up points such as the Bell 212, created severe limitations, as it made use of the nationwide X.25 packet network essentially out-of-bounds for Telidon-based services. There were also many widely held misperceptions concerning the graphics resolution and colour resolution that slowed business acceptance. Byte magazine once described it as "low resolution", when the coding system was, in fact, capable of 2^{24} resolution in 8-byte mode. There was also a pronounced emphasis in government and Telco circles on "hardware decoding" even after very capable PC-based software decoders became readily available. This emphasis on special single-purpose hardware was yet another impediment to the widespread adoption of the system.

Services included:

- Grassroots Canada by InfoMart, Toronto
- Teleguide, A kiosk-based service emphasizing tourist information in Toronto by InfoMart, and in San Francisco by The Chronicle, in Phoenix by The Arizona Republic and in Las Vegas by The Las Vegas Sun.

NAPLPS-based systems (Teleguide) were also used for an interactive Mall directory system in various locations, including the world's largest indoor mall, West Edmonton Mall (1985) and the Toronto Eaton Center. It was also used for an interactive multipoint audio-graphic educational teleconferencing system (1987) that predated today's shared interactive whiteboard systems such as those used by Blackboard and Desire2Learn.

=== United States ===
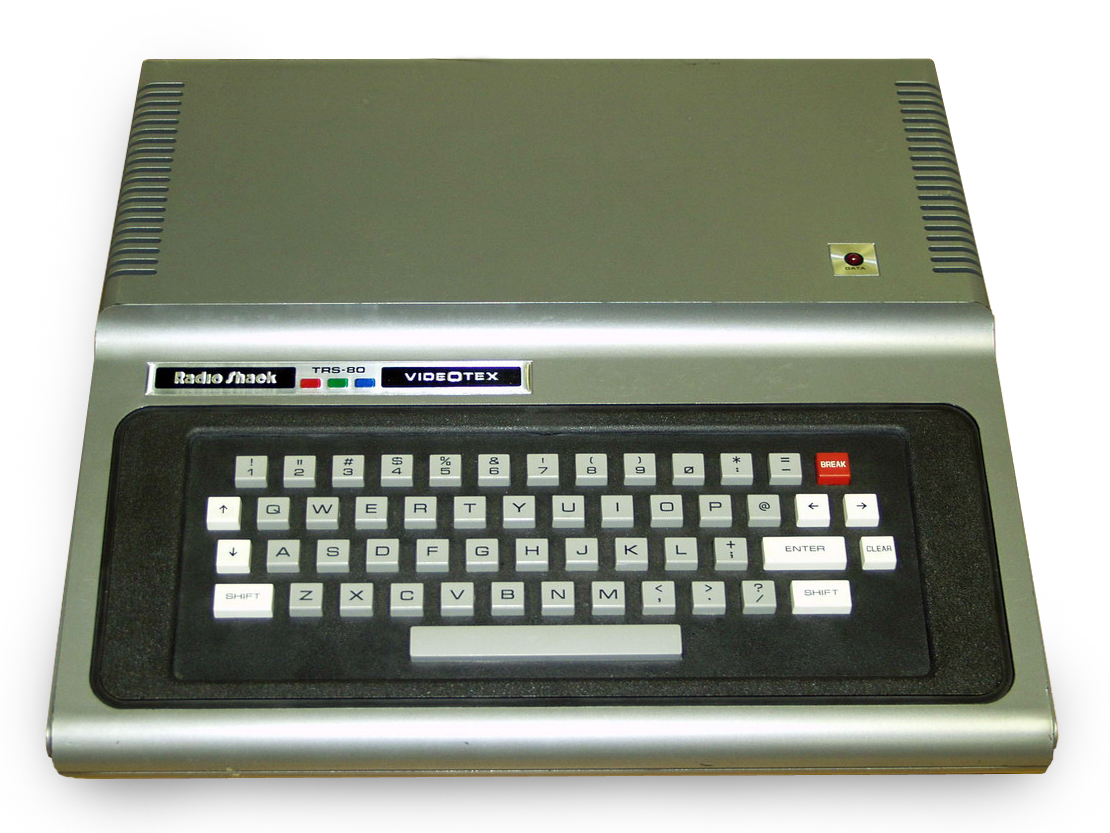
TRS-80 Videotex terminal

One of the earliest experiments with marketing videotex to consumers in the U.S. was by Radio Shack, which sold a consumer videotex terminal, essentially a single-purpose predecessor to the TRS-80 Color Computer, in outlets across the country. Sales were anemic. Radio Shack later sold a videotex software and hardware package for the Color Computer.

In an attempt to capitalize on the European experience, a number of US-based media firms started their own videotex systems in the early 1980s. Among them were Knight-Ridder, the Los Angeles Times, and Field Enterprises in Chicago, which launched Keyfax. The Fort Worth Star-Telegram partnered with Radio Shack to launch StarText (Radio Shack was headquartered in Fort Worth).

Unlike the UK, however, the FCC refused to set a single technical standard, so each provider could choose what it wished. Some selected Telidon (now standardized as NAPLPS) but the majority decided to use slight-modified versions of the Prestel hardware. StarText used proprietary software developed at the Star-Telegram. Rolled out across the country from 1982 to 1984, all of the services quickly died. None, except StarText, remained in operation after two years from their respective launch dates. StarText remained in operation until the late 1990s, when it was moved to the web.

The primary problem was that the systems were simply too slow, operating on 300 baud modems connected to large minicomputers. After waiting several seconds for the data to be sent, users then had to scroll up and down to view the articles. Searching and indexing was not provided, so users often had to download long lists of titles before they could download the article itself. Furthermore, most of the same information was available in easy-to-use TV format on the air, or in general reference books at the local library, and did not tie up a landline. Unlike the Ceefax system where the signal was available for free in every TV, many U.S. systems cost hundreds of dollars to install, plus monthly fees of $30 or more.

The most successful online services of the period were not videotex services at all. Despite the promises that videotex would appeal to the mass market, the videotex services were comfortably out-distanced by Dow Jones News/Retrieval (begun in 1973), CompuServe and (somewhat further behind) The Source, both begun in 1979. None were videotex services, nor did they use the fixed frame-by-frame videotex model for content. Instead all three used search functions and text interfaces to deliver files that were for the most part plain ASCII. Other ASCII-based services that became popular included Delphi (launched in 1983) and GEnie (launched in 1985).

Nevertheless, NAPLPS-based services were developed by several other joint partnerships between 1983 and 1987. These included:

- Viewtron, a joint venture of Knight-Ridder and AT&T
- Gateway, A service in Southern California by a joint venture of Times Mirror and InfoMart of Canada
- Keyfax, A service in Chicago by Field Enterprises and Centel
- Covidea, based in New York, set up by AT&T and Chemical Bank, with Time Inc. and Bank of America

A joint venture of AT&T-CBS completed a moderately successful trial of videotex use in the homes of Ridgewood, New Jersey, leveraging technology developed at Bell Labs. After the trial in Ridgewood AT&T and CBS parted company. Subsequently, CBS partnered with IBM and Sears, Roebuck, and Company to form Trintex. Around 1985, this entity began to offer a service called Prodigy, which used NAPLPS to send information to its users, right up until it turned into an Internet service provider in the late 1990s. Because of its relatively late debut, Prodigy was able to skip the intermediate step of persuading American consumers to attach proprietary boxes to their televisions; it was among the earliest proponents of computer-based videotex.

Videotex technology was also adopted for use internally within organizations. Digital Equipment Corp (DEC) offered a videotex product (VTX) on the VAX system. Goldman Sachs, for one, adopted and developed an internal fixed income information distribution and bond sales system based on DEC VTX. Internal systems were overtaken by external vendors, notably Bloomberg, which offered the additional benefit of providing information from different firms and allowing interactive communication between the firms.

One of the earliest corporations to participate in videotex in the United States was American Express. Its service, branded "American Express ADVANCE" included card account info, travel booking, stock prices from Shearson Lehman, and even online shopping, through its Merchandise Services division.

=== Australia ===
Australia's national public Videotex service, Viatel, was launched by Telecom Australia on 28 February 1985. It was based on the British Prestel service. The service was later renamed Discovery 40, in reference to its 40 column screen format, as well as to distinguish it from another Telecom service, Discovery 80. According to an article in a 1986 edition of the "Viatel Directory And Magazine", the Viatel system had a rapid take up in its first year.

=== New Zealand ===
A private service known as TAARIS (Travel Agents Association Reservation and Information Service) was launched in New Zealand in 1985 for the Travel Agents Association of New Zealand by ICL Computers. This service used ICL's proprietary "Bulletin" software which was based on the Prestel standard but provided many additional facilities such as the ability to run additional software for specific applications. It also supported a proprietary email service.

=== Netherlands ===
In the Netherlands, the then state-owned phone company PTT (now KPN) operated two platforms: Viditel (launched in 1980) and Videotex Nederland. From the user perspective the main difference between these systems was that Viditel used standard dial-in phone numbers where Videotex used premium-rate telephone numbers. For Viditel you needed a (paid) subscription and on top of that you paid for each page you visited. For Videotex services you normally did not need a subscription nor was there the need to authenticate: you paid for the services via the premium rate of the modem-connection based on connection time, regardless of the pages or services you retrieved.

From the information-provider point of view, there were huge differences between Viditel and Videotex: Via Viditel all data was normally stored on the central computer(s) owned and managed by KPN: to update the information in the system you connected to the Viditel computer and via a terminal-emulation application you could edit the information.

But when using Videotex the information is on a computer-platform owned and managed by the information-provider. The Videotex system connected the end-user to the Datanet 1 line of the information-provider. It was up to the information provider if the access-point (the box directly behind the telephone line) supported the videotex protocol or that it was a transparent connection where the host handled the protocol.

As said the Videotex Nederland services offered access via several primary rate numbers and the information/service provider could choose the costs for accessing his service. Depending on the number used, the tariff could vary from ƒ 0,00 to ƒ 1,00 Dutch guilders (which is between €0.00 and €0.45 euro) per minute.

Besides these public available services, generally without authentication, there were also several private services using the same infrastructure but using their own access-phone numbers and dedicated access-points. As these services were not public you had to log into the infrastructure. The largest private networks were Travelnet which was an information and booking-system for the travel industry and RDWNet, which was set up for the automobile trade to register the outcome of MOT tests to the agency that officially issued the test-report. Later, some additional services for the branch were added such as a service where the readings of the odometer could be registered each time a car was brought in for service. This was part of the Nationale Autopas Service and is now available via internet

The network of Videotex Nederland offered also direct access to most services of the French minitel system.

=== Ireland ===
A version of the French Minitel system was introduced to Ireland by eircom (then called Telecom Éireann) in 1988. The system was based on the French model and Irish services were even accessible from France via the code "3619 Irlande."

A number of major Irish businesses came together to offer a range of online services, including directory information, shopping, banking, hotel reservations, airline reservations, news, weather and information services. It was not a centralised service and individual service providers could connect to it via the Eirpac packet switching network. It could also connect to databases on other networks such as French Minitel services, European databases and university systems. The system was also the first platform in Ireland to offer users access to e-mail outside of a corporate setting. Despite being cutting edge for its time, the system failed to capture a large market and was ultimately withdrawn due to lack of commercial interest. The rise of the internet and other global online services in the early to mid-1990s played a major factor in the death of Irish Minitel. The service eventually ended by the end of the 1990s..

Minitel Ireland's terminals were technically identical to their French counterparts, except that they had a QWERTY keyboard and an RJ-11 telephone jack which is the standard telephone connector in Ireland. Terminals could be rented for 5.00 Irish pounds (6.35 euro) per month or purchased for 250.00 Irish pounds (317.43 euro) in 1992.

=== Minitel ===
With the French Minitel system, unlike any other service, the users were given an entire custom designed terminal for free. This was a deliberate move on the part of France Telecom, which reasoned that it would be cheaper in the long run to give away free terminals and teach its customers how to look up telephone listings on the terminal, instead of continuing to print and ship millions of phone books each year.

Once the network was in place, commercial services started to sprout up, becoming very popular in the mid-1980s. By 1990 tens of millions of terminals were in use. Like Prestel, Minitel used an asymmetric modem (1200-bit/s for downloading information to the terminal and 75-bit/s back).

=== Alex ===
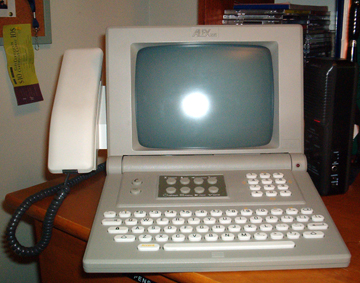
An Alex terminal, photographed in 2006

Bell Canada introduced Minitel to Quebec as Alex in 1988, and Ontario two years later. It was available both as a standalone CRT terminal (very similar in design to the ADM-3A) with 1200-bit/s modem, and as software-only for MS-DOS computers. The system was received enthusiastically thanks to a free two-month introductory period, but fizzled within two years. Online fees were very high, and the useful services such as home banking, restaurant reservations, and news feeds, that Bell Canada advertised did not materialise; within a very short time the majority of content on Alex was of poor quality or very expensive chat lines. The Alex terminals did double duty for connecting to text-only BBSes.

=== Minitel in Brazil ===
A very successful system was started in São Paulo, Brazil, by then state-owned Telesp (Telecomunicações de São Paulo). It was called Videotexto and operated from 1982 to the mid-nineties; a few other state telephone companies followed Telesp's lead, but each state kept standalone databases and services. The key to its success was that the phone company offered only the service and phone subscriber databases and third parties—banks, database providers, newspapers—offered additional content and services. The system peaked at 70 thousand subscribers around 1995.

=== South Africa ===
Beltel was launched by Telkom in the mid-eighties and continued until 1999.

== Comparison to the Internet today ==
While some people consider videotex to be the precursor of the Internet, the two technologies evolved separately and reflect fundamentally different assumptions about how to computerize communications.

The Internet in its mature form (after 1990) is highly decentralized since it relies on the cooperation of many different service providers to function. Furthermore, the various hardware and software components of the Internet are designed, manufactured, and supported by a multitude of different companies. Thus, completing any given task on the Internet, such as retrieving a webpage, relies on the contributions of many people at many distinct organizations, each of which may have only very tenuous connections with each other.

In contrast, videotex was always highly centralized (except in the French Minitel service, also including thousands of information providers running their own servers connected to the packet switched network "TRANSPAC"). Even in videotex networks where third-party companies could post their own content and operate special services like forums, a single company usually owned and operated the underlying communications network, developed and deployed the necessary hardware and software, and billed both content providers and users for access. The exception was the transaction processing videotex system developed in the UK by Michael Aldrich in 1979, which brought teleshopping (or online shopping as it was later called) into prominence and was the idea developed later through the Internet. Aldrich's systems were based on minicomputers that could communicate with multiple mainframes. Many systems were installed in the UK including the world's first supermarket teleshopping system.

Nearly all books and articles (in English) from videotex's heyday (the late 1970s and early 1980s) seem to reflect a common assumption that in any given videotex system, there would be a single company that would build and operate the network. Although this appears shortsighted in retrospect, it is important to realize that communications had been perceived as a natural monopoly for almost a century — indeed, in much of the world, telephone networks were then and still are explicitly operated as a government monopoly. The Internet as we know it today was still in its infancy in the 1970s, and was mainly operated on telephone lines owned by AT&T which were leased by ARPA. At the time, AT&T did not take seriously the threat posed by packet switching; it actually turned down the opportunity to take over ARPANET. Other computer networks at the time were not really decentralized; for example, the private network Tymnet had central control computers called supervisors which controlled each other in an automatically determined hierarchy. It would take another decade of hard work to transform the Internet from an academic toy into the basis for a modern information utility.

== Definitions ==
Definitions of Videotex and associated terms. These definitions were written in 1980 so some names may be out of date.

- Videotex: A two-way interactive service. The term was coined by CCITT and emphasizes information retrieved with the capability of displaying pages of text and pictorial material on the screens of adapted TVs.
- Viewdata: An alternative term to videotex, used in particular by the British Post Office and generally in Britain and the USA. Elsewhere, the term videotex is preferred. Viewdata was coined by the BPO in the early 1970s, but found to be unacceptable as a trade name, hence its use as a generic.
- Teletext: One-way broadcast information services for displaying pages of text and pictorial material on the screens of adapted TVs. A limited choice of information pages is continuously cycled at the broadcasting station. By means of a keypad, a user can select one page at a time for display from the cycle. The information is transmitted in digital form usually using spare capacity in the broadcast TV signal. Careful design can ensure that there is no interference with the normal TV picture. Alternatively, it can use the full capacity of a dedicated channel. Compared with two-way videotex, teletext is inherently more limited, though generally less costly.
- Teletex: A text communication standard for communicating word processors and similar terminals combining the facilities of office typewriters and text editing.
- Ceefax ("See facts"): The BBC's name for its public teletext service available on two TV channels using spare capacity.
- Oracle ("Optional recognition of coded line electronics"): The name of the IBA's equivalent teletext service.
- Bildschirmtext, DataVision, Bulletin, Captain, Teletel, Prestel, Viewtron, etc.: The proprietary names for specific videotex implementations.

== See also ==
- Online service provider
- Nabu Network—the Nabu Network was not a videotex system, but it was an early data communications service which was centrally run by the Canadian cable industry.
