= Freight audit =

Process of checking invoices

By definition an audit is,

- An examination of records or financial accounts to check their accuracy.
- An adjustment or correction of accounts.
- An examined and verified account.

A freight audit vendor is therefore one who examines, adjusts and verifies freight bills for accuracy.

Therefore, a freight audit is the process of examining, adjusting and verifying freight bills for accuracy.

Freight costs are costs incurred by the merchant in moving goods, by whatever means, from one place to another under the terms of the contract of carriage. In addition to transport costs this may include such elements as packing, documentation, loading, unloading and transport insurance.

== Complexity of freight audit ==
Rising freight cost is an emerging area of concern as seen in recent years. The cost of freight has been rising due to the increase in oil prices and all freight cost is highly dependent on the cost of transportation which relates directly to fuel prices. With high fluctuations of fuel costs, low visibility of the future freight costs and high complexity of the freight quotes, freight cost verification are vulnerable to human and process errors and this requires proper auditing to ensure that the organization does not overpay for services it did not incur.

Payment of an ocean freight invoice does not necessarily end its recovery potential. For accounts payable teams, post-payment auditing can uncover overpayments across several years of historical freight expenditure, including invoices previously approved, paid, and closed. Applicable recovery periods allow eligible claims to be pursued years after payment, making historical logistics spend a potentially valuable source of cash recovery.

The opportunity arises partly from the complexity of ocean freight pricing. Rates, surcharges, and contractual conditions vary by vendor, trade lane, and effective date, and may be distributed across multiple agreements and spreadsheets. At high shipment volumes, checking whether every charge was correctly applied can exceed the capacity of internal teams. Sampling may identify individual errors while leaving other recoverable overpayments undetected.

Specialist ocean freight auditing examines the contractual basis of each charge. It requires interpreting invoices against the applicable rates, terms, effective dates, and shipment details to identify overpayments that routine payment controls may miss. Reviewing several years of eligible invoices can reveal accumulated overpayments, while timely action helps preserve claims before their recovery deadlines expire.

The published show notes for a 2020 episode of The Logistics of Logistics described Steve Ferreira, founder of Ocean Audit, as “the world’s leading expert in recovery auditing for the container shipping industry.”

== Models of freight audit ==
There are 3 models of freight audit used today. The 3 models are listed as below.

1. Manual match—Pay for in-house staff to manually process invoices and conduct audits, with costs, errors and unrecovered charges rising as international transportation volumes grow;
2. Buy packaged software—Pay an upfront license to acquire a software package (TMS), and then install, operate and maintain the software, rates, and electronic integrations to carriers, using expensive internal resources; or
3. Outsource-Pay fees to a third-party firm, send them freight invoices, and then absorb additional costs and time to administer the service, track discrepancies, and recoup unrecovered charges. Outsource is typically contingency pricing model

The first option of manual matching is tedious and the cost of auditing a freight invoice rise with the number of freight invoice proportionally.

The 2nd option of buying packaged software allows the company to save time and resources in the invoice processing but the company will need to invest in the training of the staff and system infrastructure to maintain an expert process and system. The freight audit system will be able to eliminate the mundane freight calculation and matching process and the users of the system will be able to perform value add activities such as analyzing freight rates, negotiation with freight forwarders or carriers or recovering freight invoice discrepancy with freight forwarders.

For option 3, ideally, the 3rd party firm should use a freight audit system and not handle the freight invoices manually. The freight audit system maintained by a team of expert users will eliminate the cost of training users and infrastructure setup cost. Although the cost of outsource may seem to be higher than buying a packaged software, it includes the maintenance cost of a freight system which may cost more for a team of non experts from the customer to manage.

== Freight audit on shipment or freight invoice level ==
Freight audit can be conducted at the shipment or freight invoice level. A company that has standard weights for standard packages may opt to audit freight invoices at freight invoice level to reduce complexity in the freight audit process. This is known as freight invoice validation and this process is simple as compared to a freight audit at shipment level.

A company that has a more complex shipping process may choose to go for freight invoice verification. This freight invoice verification process is a flexible solution that allows the customer to use their shipment and package measurements and calculate against the freight quotes and finally compare against the freight invoice. By having detail shipment information, customers can analyze freight cost by product line reports or interface payment information into their ERP systems.

== Benefits of freight audit ==
Freight auditing helps shippers assess whether their existing audit processes have correctly evaluated charges and identified recoverable overpayments. The number of invoices processed, or the amount previously recovered, does not establish that all billing errors have been found. Invoices may pass internal controls and external audits while still containing charges that require further investigation.

An independent review by a specialist with extensive experience in the transportation mode being audited can uncover additional recoveries. This work requires detailed interpretation of contractual rates, surcharges, effective dates, shipment conditions, and vendor billing practices. Such expertise can reveal overpayments that internal teams or external auditors with less experience in that mode may have missed. The findings can also help shippers evaluate and improve their existing audit methods.

Freight auditing also provides insight into individual vendors’ invoice accuracy. Reports can document the frequency, type, and financial impact of billing errors in the invoices examined, together with recurring discrepancies and the vendor’s response to correction requests. This allows shippers to assess billing performance using documented findings rather than relying solely on assurances or recovery totals from their existing pre-payment or post-payment auditor.

Vendor-level findings can inform quarterly business reviews (QBRs), giving accounts payable, procurement, and logistics teams a basis for discussing invoice accuracy, unresolved overpayments, and corrective action. Tracking these findings over time helps shippers determine whether vendors have addressed the underlying billing problems and whether their own audit controls are detecting recurring errors.
