= Minitel =

French videotex service

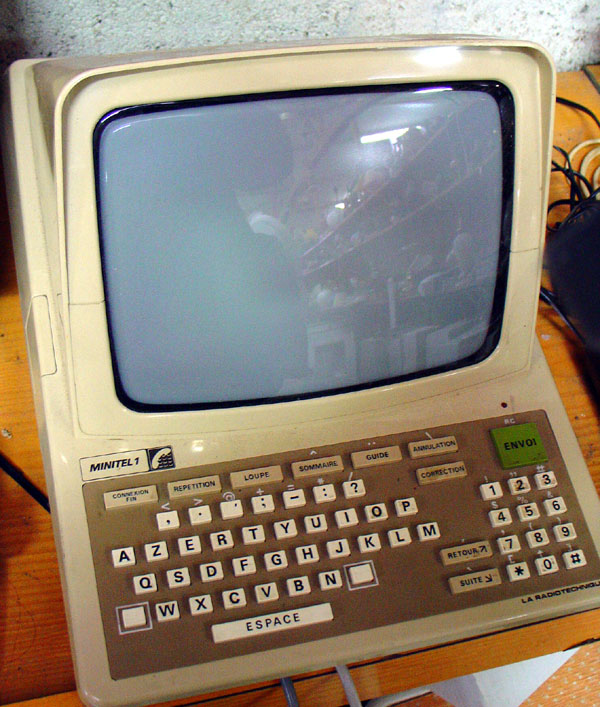
- Minitel 1, built in 1982
- Developer: Postes, Télégraphes et Téléphones
- Type: Videotex
- Launched: 1982; 44 years ago
- Discontinued: June 30, 2012; 14 years ago
- Platform: Minitel
- Status: Discontinued
- Members: 10 million monthly connections (2009)
- Website: minitel.fr at the Wayback Machine (archived 2012-07-02)

Minitel, officially known as TELETEL, was an interactive videotex online service accessible through telephone lines. It was the world's first and most successful mass-market online service prior to the World Wide Web. It was developed in Cesson-Sévigné, Brittany, by government-owned France Télécom.

The service was initially launched on an experimental basis in July 1980 in Saint-Malo and extended to other regions in late 1980. It was commercially introduced throughout France in 1982 by the Postes, Télégraphes et Téléphones (PTT), since 1991, divided into France Télécom and La Poste. From its inception, users were able to make online purchases, book train tickets, access business information services, search the telephone directory, maintain a mailbox, and utilize chat functionalities similar to those now supported by the World Wide Web.

In February 2009, France Télécom reported that the Minitel network still maintained 10 million monthly connections. The service was discontinued by France Télécom on 30 June 2012.

== Name ==
Officially known as TELETEL, the name Minitel is derived from the French title Médium interactif par numérisation d'information téléphonique (Interactive medium for digitized information by telephone).

== History ==
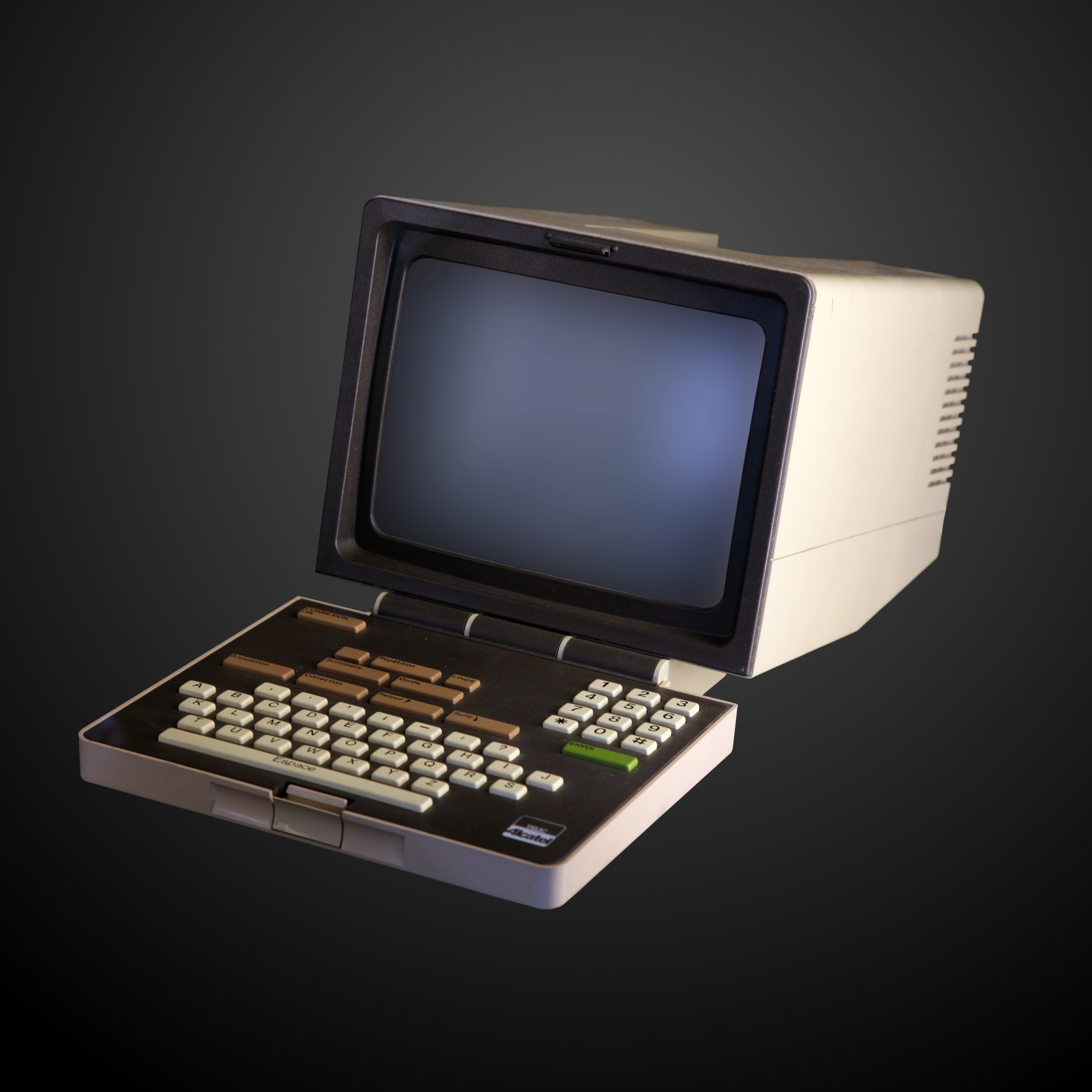
A 1985 TELIC-1 Alcatel Minitel terminal with a non-AZERTY keyboard

Videotex was a crucial element in the telecommunications sector of many industrialized countries, with numerous national post, telephone, and telegraph companies and commercial ventures launching pilot projects. It was viewed as a major force in advancing towards an information society.

In the late 1970s, France lagged noticeably behind in the telephone network industry. Fewer than seven million telephone lines served a population of 47 million people. Recognizing this shortfall, both French citizens and government leaders grew concerned about the United States’ technological advantage in telecommunications. This concern led to the birth of the concept of telematics—a term coined by Simon Nora and Alain Minc to describe the combination of telecommunications and informatics. Their goal was to digitize the national telephone network, laying the groundwork for what would eventually become Minitel.

In 1978, Postes, Télégraphes et Téléphones (PTT) initiated the design of the Minitel network. By distributing terminals capable of accessing a nationwide electronic directory of telephone and address information, the PTT aimed to increase the utilization of the country’s 23 million phone lines and reduce the costs associated with printing phone books and employing directory assistance personnel. Millions of terminals were given for free (officially loans, and property of the PTT) to telephone subscribers.

The telephone company prioritized ease of use. The French government's decision to provide free Minitel terminals to every household was a key factor in the widespread adoption and success of Minitel. By providing a popular service on simple, free equipment, Minitel achieved high market penetration and avoided the chicken and egg problem that hindered the widespread adoption of similar systems in the United States. In exchange for the terminal, Minitel users received only the yellow pages (classified as commercial listings with advertisements), while the white pages were freely accessible on Minitel and could be searched faster than through a paper directory.

In the early 1980s, parallel to the US development of the ARPANET, France launched the Minitel project to bring data networking into homes. According to the PTT, during the first eight years of nationwide operation, 8 billion francs were spent on purchasing terminals, resulting in a profit of 3.5 billion F after deducting payments to information providers such as newspapers. An average of 500 million francs was saved annually by printing fewer phone books.

On 15 July 1980, a trial involving 55 residential and business telephone customers using experimental terminals commenced in Saint-Malo, two days after a presentation to President Valéry Giscard d'Estaing on 13 July. In autumn 1980, this trial expanded to 2,500 customers in other regions. In May 1981, 4,000 experimental terminals with a different design were distributed in Ille-et-Vilaine. In 1982 commercial service using Minitel terminals was launched. By the end of 1983, there were 120,000 Minitel terminals in France. In 1984, it became highly successful when the French government distributed free Minitel terminals to households.

Minitel became a financial success for the PTT, as using the service cost the 2022 equivalent of 30 euro cent per minute. The telephone company primarily provided the white pages, while establishing infrastructure for other entities to offer services. Minitel facilitated access to categories including the phone directory (free), mail-order retail companies, airline or train ticket purchases, information services, databases, message boards, online dating services, and computer games.

By 1985, games and electronic messaging accounted for 42 percent of Minitel traffic, with messaging alone representing 17 percent of traffic by 1988. The platform became particularly popular among young people, who would engage in late-night sessions playing text-based online video games.

By early 1986, 1.4 million terminals were connected to the Minitel network, with plans to distribute an additional million by the end of the year. This expansion faced opposition from newspapers concerned about competition from an electronic network. In 1980, Ouest-France expressed the concern that Minitel would "separate people from each other and endanger social relationships". To mitigate opposition from the newspapers, they were permitted to establish the first consumer services on Minitel. Libération offered 24-hour online news, including results from events at the 1984 Summer Olympics in Los Angeles that occurred overnight in France. Providers promoted their services in their own publications, which helped to market the Minitel network. Newspapers were founded specifically to create Minitel services.

By 1988, three million terminals were installed, with 100,000 new units being added monthly. The telephone directory received 23 million calls per month, with 40,000 updates daily. Approximately six thousand other services were available, with around 250 new ones being added each month.

The emergence of Minitel led to the proliferation of numerous start-up ventures, similar to the later dot-com bubble of World Wide Web-related companies. Many of these small enterprises encountered challenges due to an oversaturated market or poor business practices, such as inadequate infrastructure for online retailers. By the late 1980s, the Minitel system had become widespread in France, with numerous products displaying their Minitel numbers as a direct marketing tool.

Despite initial expectations, messageries roses ("pink messages"), adult chat services facilitated by operators posing as receptive women, gained significant traction, causing some discomfort among government officials who preferred to focus on the growing business applications of messaging. Extensive street advertising promoted services such as "3615 Sextel", "Jane", "kiss", "3615 penthouse", and "men". These and other pornographic sites faced criticism for their potential accessibility to minors. While the government opted against implementing coercive measures, it underscored the responsibility of parents, rather than governmental intervention, in regulating children's online activities. The government did impose a tax on pornographic online services.

Numerous services were covertly operated by conservative newspapers, which publicly expressed disapproval of the sex industry. The majority of operators were not the scantily-clad women depicted in the advertisements, but were men engaged in their regular occupations.

By the mid-1990s, it provided over 20,000 services, including home banking and specialized databases. Minitel was widespread in French homes a decade before the Internet became known in the US. France Télécom maintained steady income from Minitel and cautiously approached the Internet to protect its business model. This slow adaptation paralleled the hesitant adoption of high-definition TV in the US, where companies resisted new technologies to safeguard profits. France's struggle with Internet adoption reflected typical free-market issues, rather than those associated with centralized economies.

In 1997, recognizing the emerging global Internet society, the French government partially privatized France Télécom, ending its telephone monopoly and introducing competition in the telecommunications sector. This led to reduced prices for telephone communications, allowing more affordable dial-up Internet access by the late 1990s. Minitel became quickly outpaced by the development of the Internet. France Télécom estimated that by the end of 1999, almost 9 million terminals, including web-enabled personal computers (Windows, the classic Mac OS, and Linux), had access to the network, which was used by 25 million people out of a total population of 60 million. Developed by 10,000 companies, nearly 26,000 different services were available by 1996.

== Finances ==
Payment methods included credit cards for purchases and telephone bills, with rates contingent upon the websites visited. Initially, users subscribed to individual services, but adoption surged following the introduction of a "kiosk" model by the telephone company, named after newsagent shops. Charges for Minitel usage and voice calls were amalgamated on the monthly telephone bill without itemized breakdown. Service providers typically received two-thirds of the $10 per hour fee paid by customers as of 1988.

Since the telephone company managed bill collection and users who failed to settle bills risked losing telephone service, the customer acquisition cost for service providers remained low. The consolidated billing system fostered impulse shopping, as users, while browsing, often discovered and utilized additional services beyond their original intention. Given the anonymity of users and services, Minitel usage was prevalent in workplaces where companies covered telephone expenses.

In 1985, France Télécom generated 620 million francs (approximately US$70 million) in revenue from Minitel. Throughout the year, 2,000 private companies collectively earned 289 million francs (about US$35 million), while Libération, a prominent newspaper, garnered 2.5 million francs (about US$300,000) from the service in September. Despite the increasing prevalence of the World Wide Web, Minitel connections remained stable in the late 1990s, with a consistent monthly volume of 100 million connections alongside 150 million online directory inquiries.

In response to the rising incidence of cybercrime, France Telecom developed a new contract specifying that all Minitel service operators must identify themselves by providing their name and address. This measure aimed to enhance security and accountability within the network.

In 1998, Minitel returned €832 million (US$1,121 million) in revenue, with €521 million allocated by France Télécom to service providers. Notably, Minitel sales in the late 1990s constituted nearly 15 percent of total sales for La Redoute and 3 Suisses, prominent mail order companies in France. By 2005, the most popular Minitel application was Teleroute, an online real-time freight exchange, which accounted for nearly 8 percent of Minitel usage.

In December 1985, Minitel users made more than 22 million calls, up 400 percent in one year. In 1994 they made 1,913 million Minitel calls, used the system for 110 million hours, and spent 6.6 billion francs. In 2005, there were 351 million calls for 18.5 million hours of connection, generating €206 million of revenue, of which €145 million were redistributed to 2,000 service providers. These numbers were declining at around 30 percent per year. There were still six million terminals owned by France Télécom, which had been left with their users in order to avoid recycling problems.

Key utilization of Minitel included banking and financial services, which leveraged Minitel's security features, as well as access to professional databases. France Télécom cited 12 million updates to personal carte vitale healthcare cards were facilitated through Minitel.

By 2007, revenue exceeded US$100 million. This trend persisted into 2010, with revenues reaching €30 million, of which 85 percent was allocated to service providers.

== Phonebook ==
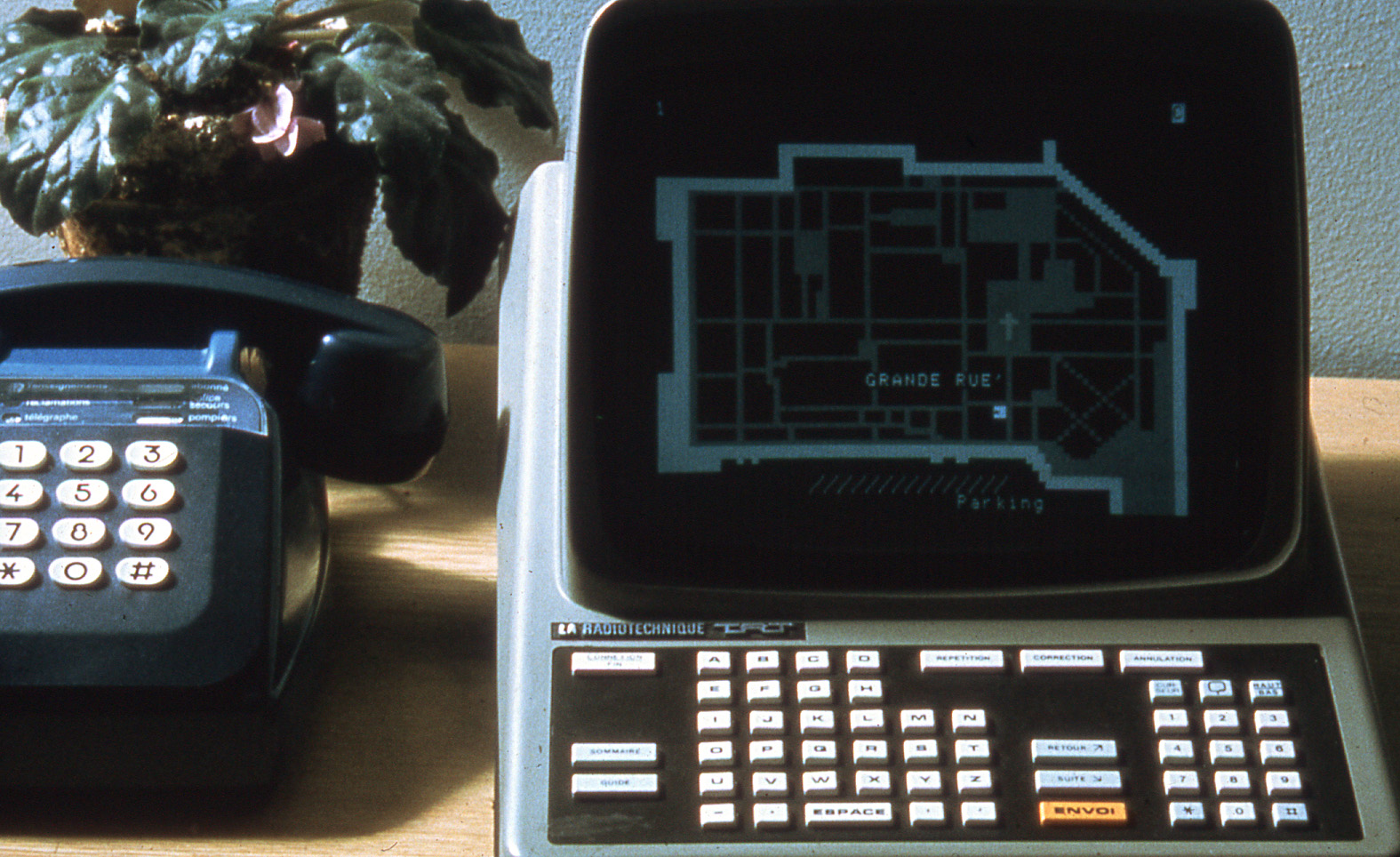
The Saint Malo "Annuaire Electronique" in July 1980

The most popular service of the Minitel was the Annuaire Electronique (telephone directory). It garnered significant popularity, with approximately half of the network's calls directed on it in 1985. In May 1985, a nationwide white pages directory covering all 24 million telephone subscribers was introduced, accessible through the phone number 11.

Following the adoption of the new French numbering system in October 1996, access to the phone directory transitioned to 3611. Companies had the option to include up to three lines of supplementary information and a rudimentary website. Advertisement space within the Minitel phone directory was managed by the Office d'Annonces (ODA), today known as Solocal / Pages Jaunes Groupe based in Sèvres, France. In 1991, the "Minitel Website" for the Paris Sony Stores contained already over 100 pages. Today the 3611 Minitel Directory is replaced by the online white or yellow pages.

On 11 February 2009, France Télécom and PagesJaunes jointly announced the cancellation of plans to discontinue the Minitel service in March 2009, despite its continued high usage of its directory assistance service, which was still accessed over a million times monthly. France Télécom retired the service on 30 June 2012, attributing the decision to operational costs and declining customer interest.

== Technology ==
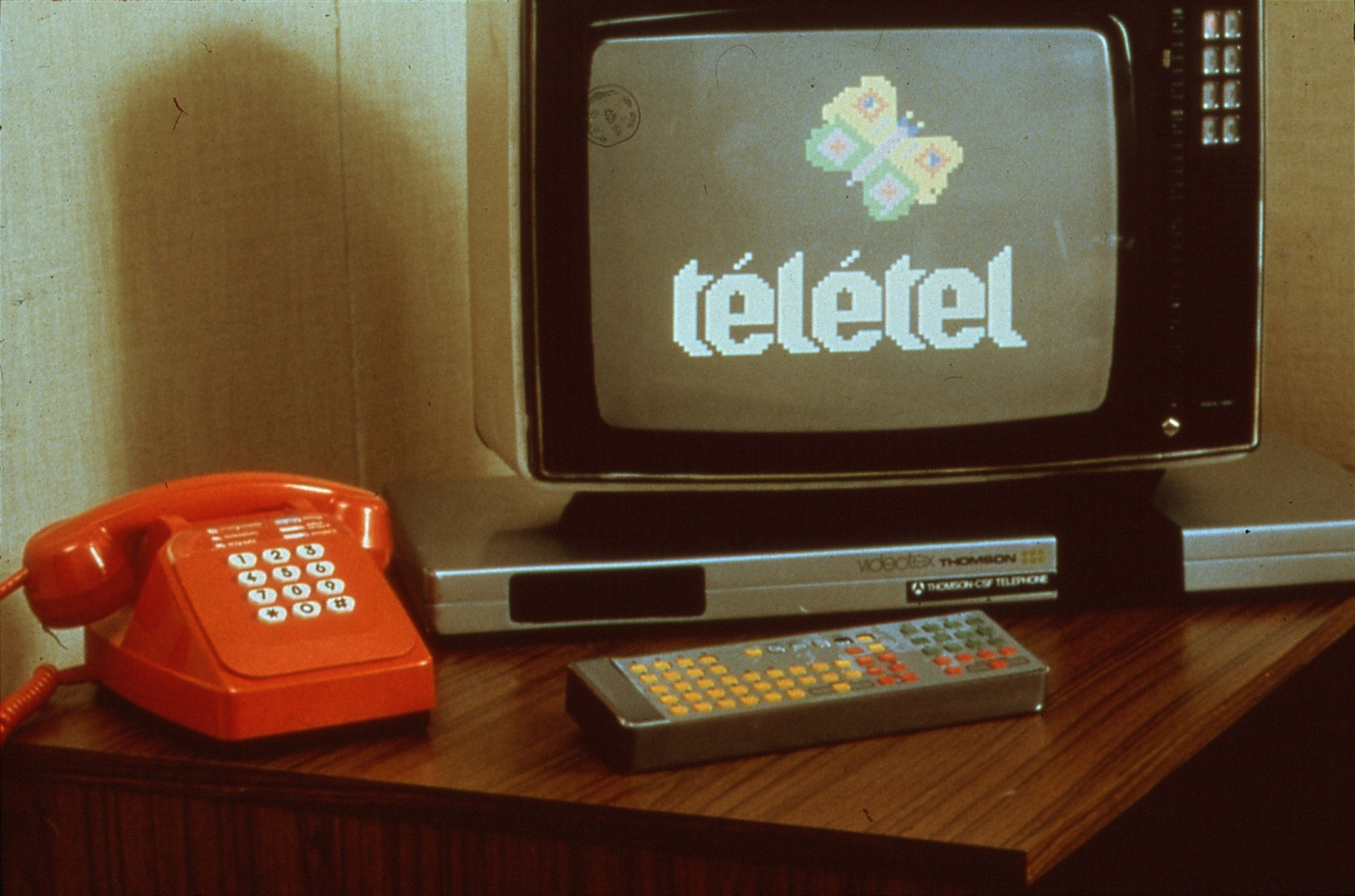
Télétel on a Thomson videotex terminal

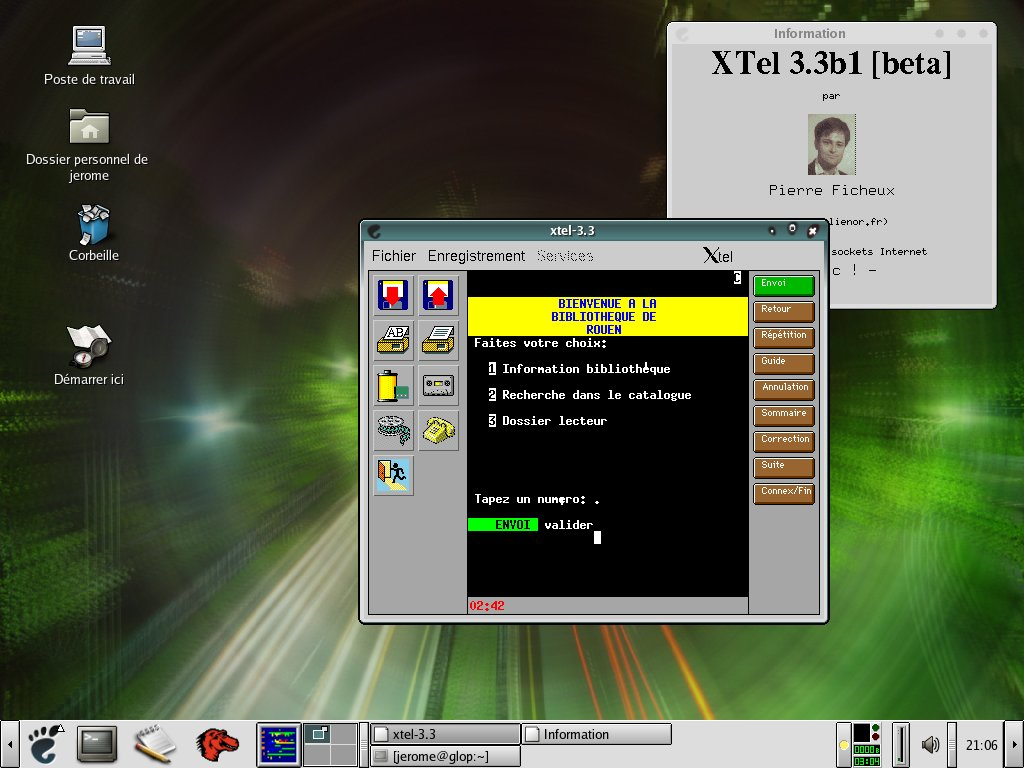
Minitel could be emulated on Linux with Xtel.

Minitel utilized computer terminals featuring a text-only monochrome screen, a keyboard, and a modem, all integrated into a single tabletop unit. These terminals had the capability to display basic graphics using a predefined set of block graphics characters. Color units were eventually offered for an additional fee, but they saw limited adoption. Aftermarket printers were also available to users.

Operating over the existing Transpac network, Minitel terminals connected to the system by dialing a short code number, initiating a connection to a PAVI (Point d'Accès VIdéotexte, meaning "videotext access point") via the subscriber's analog telephone line. The PAVI was then digitally linked to the destination servers of the relevant company or administration through Transpac. The surge in popularity of the service led to a temporary disruption in June 1985, lasting two weeks, when an increase in connection attempts per second revealed a dormant software bug.

In France, the widely recognised dial number for accessing Minitel services was 3615, with 3617 reserved for premium services. Minitel service names typically incorporated these numbers as prefixes to signify their association with the system. Billboard advertisements during this period often featured minimal content, comprising an image, company name, and a "3615" number. The inclusion of the "3615" number implied the promotion of a Minitel service. A notable instance of this cultural reference can be observed in the title of the film 3615 code Père Noël, where a child endeavors to contact Santa Claus using Minitel, to inadvertently connect with a local criminal.

Minitel used a full-duplex data transmission method facilitated by its modem. The downlink operated at a speed of 1200 bit/s (equivalent to 9 KB/min), while the uplink operated at 75 bit/s (equivalent to 0.6 KB/min). This configuration enabled relatively swift downloads by the standards of its time. Referred to colloquially as "1275", the system was more accurately designated as V.23. Originally designed for general-purpose data communications, it found widespread application in Minitel and analogous services worldwide.

Technically, Minitel refers to the terminals, while the network is known as Télétel.

Minitel terminals were equipped with an AZERTY keyboard, reflective of the standard keyboard layout in France, as opposed to the QWERTY layout more commonly used in English-speaking regions. Some early models deviated from this convention, featuring an ABCDEF keyboard arrangement.

== Minitel and the Internet ==
The impact of Minitel on the development of the Internet in France remains a topic of significant debate, partly because Minitel offered over a thousand services, many of which are now available on the Internet. In 1986, French university students effectively organized a national strike utilizing Minitel, showcasing an early instance of digital communication tools being employed for technological political objectives.

The French government's allegiance to the domestically developed Minitel impeded the full, widespread adoption of the Internet in France. Despite reaching a peak of nine million terminals in the 1990s, there remained 810,000 terminals in France as late as 2012.

Resources within France Télécom were directed towards Minitel development, diverting attention from Internet-related initiatives. The sustained emphasis on Minitel by France Telecom did not significantly impact the adoption or advancement of internet-based companies in France. By 2018, France was comparable with the other western countries in terms of high-speed internet adoption in households.

== Minitel and similar services in other countries ==
- Austria: same as in Germany, see "Bildschirmtext".
- Belgium: Minitel was launched by Belgacom and delivered services led by Teleroute. Although it was used by businesses, it was rarely used by the public. The main reason was that the terminals were not offered for free as in France and that usage of the service was expensive (50 Euro cents a minute). Moreover, there was never much promotion thereof by Belgacom.
- Brazil: Telebrás had a videotex service called "Videotexto" or "VTX" during the 1980s and 1990s with services provided by local telephone companies such as Telesp (now part of Telefônica Vivo). Services included chats, games, telephone list search, and electronic banking, among others. The Minitel protocol is still used by some cable TV companies to provide general information to their customers.
- Canada: Bell Canada experimented with a Minitel-like system known as Alex with terminals called AlexTel. The system was conceptually similar to Minitel, but used the Canadian NAPLPS protocols and North American Bell System RJ-11 standard telephone connectors. Originally launched experimentally in the Montreal area, Alex was then launched in most areas served by Bell Canada (primarily Ontario and Quebec) with offers of a free trial period and terminal. The principal information offering was the telephone directory. Although branded as a "bilingual" (English and French Canadian) service, the majority of other services offered were the experimental ones originally offered in Quebec and completely Francophone. Retention rates were reportedly close to zero. The service closed down shortly after exiting the experimental stage. Telidon was an earlier Canadian text and graphics service using the same technological underpinnings.
- Finland: In 1986, PTL-Tele, then Sonera (now part of Telia Company) launched the on-line service called TeleSampo. TeleSampo included not only videotex services, but also many other Ascii-based Value Added Services (VAS). Roughly at the same time, HPY HTF (now Elisa) launched a videotex service called Infotel (fi). TeleSampo service was switched off in 2004.
- Germany: "Bildschirmtext" (BTX) that existed between 1983 and 2001 is almost as old as Minitel and technically very similar, but it was largely unsuccessful because consumers had to buy expensive decoders to use it. The German postal service held a monopoly on the decoders that prevented competition and lower prices. Few people bought the boxes, so there was little incentive for companies to post content, which in turn did nothing to further box sales. When the monopoly was loosened, it was too late because PC-based online services had started to appear. Some post offices in Germany offered BTX boxes for public use, allowing access to BTX without owning a box.
- Ireland: Minitel was introduced to Ireland by Eir (then called Telecom Éireann) in 1988. The system was based on the French model and Irish services were even accessible from France via the code "36 19 Irlande". A number of major Irish businesses came together to offer a range of online services, including directory information, shopping, banking, hotel reservations, airline reservations, news, weather and information services. The system was also the first platform in Ireland to offer users access to e-mail outside of a corporate setting. Despite being cutting edge for its time, the system failed to capture a large market and was ultimately withdrawn due to lack of commercial interest. The rise of the internet and other global online services in the early to mid-1990s played a major factor in the death of Irish Minitel. Minitel Ireland's terminals were technically identical to their French counterparts, except that they had a Qwerty keyboard and an RJ-11 telephone jack which is the standard telephone connector in Ireland. Terminals could be rented for 5.00 Irish pounds (6.35 euros) per month or purchased for 250.00 Irish pounds (317.43 euros) in 1992.
- Italy: In 1985, the national telephone operator SIP – Società italiana per l'esercizio telefonico (now known as Telecom Italia) launched the Videotel (it) service. The system use was charged on a per-page basis. Due to the excessive cost of the hardware and the expensive services, diffusion was very low, leading to the diffusion of a FidoNet-oriented movement. The service was shut down in 1994.
- Netherlands: The then state-owned phone company PTT (now KPN) operated two platforms: Viditel (nl) and Videotex Nederland (nl). The main difference was that Viditel used one big central host where Videotex NL used a central access system responsible for realizing the correct connection to the required host: owned and managed by others. Viditel was introduced on 7 August 1980, and required a Vidimodem as well as a compatible home computer (one such example was the Philips P2000T which had a built-in Teletext chip) or a television set which could support Teletext; the required equipment itself would cost anywhere between 3,000 and 5,000 Dutch guilders overall. Viditel was shut down in September 1989 due to high operating costs and was succeeded by the cheaper and more widely used Videotex Nederland. The Videotex NL services offered access via several premium rate numbers and the information/service provider could choose the costs for accessing his service. Depending on the number used, the tariff could vary from 0–1 guilders (0.00–0.45 euro) per minute. Some private networks such as Travelnet (for travel-agencies) and RDWNet for automotive industry, used the same platform as Videotex NL but used dedicated dial-in phone numbers, dedicated access-hardware and also used authentication. Although the protocol used in France for Minitel was slightly different from the international standard one could use the "international" terminal (or PC's with the correct terminal-emulation software) to access the French services. It was possible to connect to most French Minitel services via the Dutch Videotex NL network, but the price per minute was considerably higher: most French Minitel services were reachable via the dial-in number 06-7900, which had a tariff of 1 guilder/minute (approx. €0,45/minute). Videotex Nederland was eventually shut down in 1997, and the parent company behind Videotex Nederland was subsequently renamed as Planet Media Group.
- Singapore: Singapore Teleview was first trialled by the Telecom Authority of Singapore (now Singtel) beginning in 1987, and was formally launched in 1991. The Teleview system, while similar in concept to the Minitel and Prestel, was unique in that it was able to display photographic images instead of graphical images used by Minitel and Prestel. Teleview was eventually rendered obsolete by SLIP/PPP-based modem Internet connections in the late 1990s.
- South Africa: Videotex was introduced by Telkom in 1986 and named Beltel. The Minitel was introduced later to popularise the service.
- Spain: Videotex was introduced by Telefónica in 1990 and named Ibertex. The Ibertex was based on the French model but used the German Bildschirmtext CEPT-1 profile.
- Sweden: Swedish state-owned telephone company Televerket (now Telia Company) introduced a similar service, called Teleguide (sv), in 1991. Teleguide was shut down in 1993 due to a contract dispute between Televerket and the vendors IBM and Esselte.
- Switzerland: same as in Germany, see "Bildschirmtext".
- United Kingdom: The Prestel system was similar in concept to Minitel, using dedicated terminals or software on personal computers to access the network. The number of Prestel subscribers only reached 90 thousand.
- United States: In 1991, France Télécom launched a Minitel service called "101 Online" in San Francisco; this venture was not successful. In the early 1990s, US West (subsequently Qwest and now Lumen Technologies) launched a Minitel service in the Minneapolis and Omaha markets called "CommunityLink". This joint venture of US West and France Télécom provided Minitel content to IBM PC, Commodore 64, and Apple II owners using a Minitel-emulating software application over a dialup modem. Many of the individual services were the same as or similar to those offered by France Télécom to the French market; in fact, some chat services linked up with France Télécom's network in France. The service was fairly short-lived as competing offerings from providers like AOL, Prodigy, and CompuServe as well as independent bulletin board systems and internet service providers offered more services targeted at American users for a lower price. Many of US West's Minitel offerings were charged à la carte or hourly while competitors offered monthly all-inclusive pricing and many smaller BBSes were completely free of charge as long as users called a local number. Minitel also offered services directly in the US with a DOS based client that was sent out to customers for use with an IBM PC compatible. In 1983, the publishing company Knight Ridder and AT&T offered a competing service called Viewtron. The service offered news, aviation schedules and educative content, but no way of mail communication, as the publishing company thought communication should be one-way only.

== See also ==
- History of the World Wide Web
- Internet in France
