= Transportation management system =

Supply chain management for transportation operations

A transportation management system (TMS) is a subset of supply chain management concerning transportation operations, which may be part of an enterprise resource planning (ERP) system.

A TMS usually 'sits' between an ERP or legacy order processing and warehouse/distribution module. A typical scenario would include both inbound (procurement) and outbound (shipping) orders to be evaluated by the TMS Planning Module offering the user various suggested routing solutions. These solutions are evaluated by the user for reasonableness and are passed along to the transportation provider analysis module to select the best mode and the least cost possible. Once the best option is selected, the solution is typically generated by an electronic load tendering and a track/trace system to execute the optimized shipment by the selected carrier, and later to support freight audit and payment (settlement process). Links back to ERP systems (after orders turned into optimal shipments), and sometimes secondarily to Warehouse Management System (WMS) programs are also linked to ERP.

== Licensing ==
These systems have been offered with different types of licensing arrangements. The four main offerings are:

1. On-premises licensing (traditionally purchased license)
2. Hosted licensing (remote, SaaS, Cloud)
3. On-premises hosted licensing (a blend of 1 and 2)
4. Hosted – TMS free of licensing (same as 2 but free with no license requirements)

Additionally, some software providers were either acquired or merged with supply chain management consultancies and started offering shippers "blended" managed and software services as an outsourced process. Primary Tier 1 TMS providers are still independent, carrier and 3PL neutral, and ERP neutral. While ERP providers are moving to improve their on-premises transportation management offerings by adding TMS modules to their existing, implemented base, the advent of Software-as-a-Service or "SaaS" delivery resulted in a surge of emerging TMS providers.

== Functionalities ==
Transportation management systems manage four key processes of transportation management:

1. Planning and decision making – TMS will define the most efficient transport schemes, according to the given parameters, which have a lower or higher importance of various factors according to the user policy: transport cost, shorter lead-time, fewer stops possible to ensure quality, flow's regrouping coefficient, etc.
2. Transportation Execution – TMS will allow for the execution of the transportation plan, such as carrier rate acceptance, carrier dispatching, and EDI.
3. Transport follow-up – TMS will allow the following any physical or administrative operation regarding transportation: traceability of transport events by event (shipping from A, arrival at B, customs clearance, etc.), editing of reception, customs clearance, invoicing and booking documents, sending of transport alerts such as delay, accident, non-forecast stops.
4. Measurement – TMS have or need to have a logistics key performance indicator (KPI) reporting function for transport.

Various functions of a TMS include:

- Planning and optimizing terrestrial transport rounds
- Inbound and outbound transportation mode and transportation provider selection
- Management of motor carrier, rail, air, and maritime transport
- Real-time transportation tracking
- Service quality control in the form of KPIs (see below)
- Vehicle Load and Route optimization
- Transport costs and scheme simulation
- Shipment batching of orders
- Freight Negotiation
- Cost control, KPI (Key Performance Indicators) reporting and statistics
- Freight Audit
  - Typical KPIs include, but are not limited to:
    1. % of On-Time Pick-Up or Delivery Performance relative to requested
    2. Cost Per Metric – mile; km; weight; cube; pallet
    3. Productivity in monetary terms, e.g., cost per unit weight or shipping unit
    4. Productivity in operational terms, e.g., shipping units/order or weight/load

However, all the above logistical functions need to be scrutinized as to how each parameter functions.

== Market ==
Gartner predicted the global transportation management system market to grow 60% from $1.3 billion in 2019 to $2.1 billion in 2024.
