= List of teletext services =

Teletext (or "broadcast teletext") is a television information retrieval service developed in the United Kingdom in the early 1970s. It offers a range of text-based information, typically including national, international and sporting news, weather and TV schedules. Subtitle (or closed captioning) information is also transmitted in the teletext signal, typically on page 888 or 777.

A number of similar teletext services were developed in other countries, some of which attempted to address the limitations of the British-developed system, with its simple graphics and fixed page sizes.

== Active and defunct teletext services by country ==
=== Albania ===
- Top-Channel
- TVSH
- Mediaset
- RAI
- SAT.1

=== Austria ===
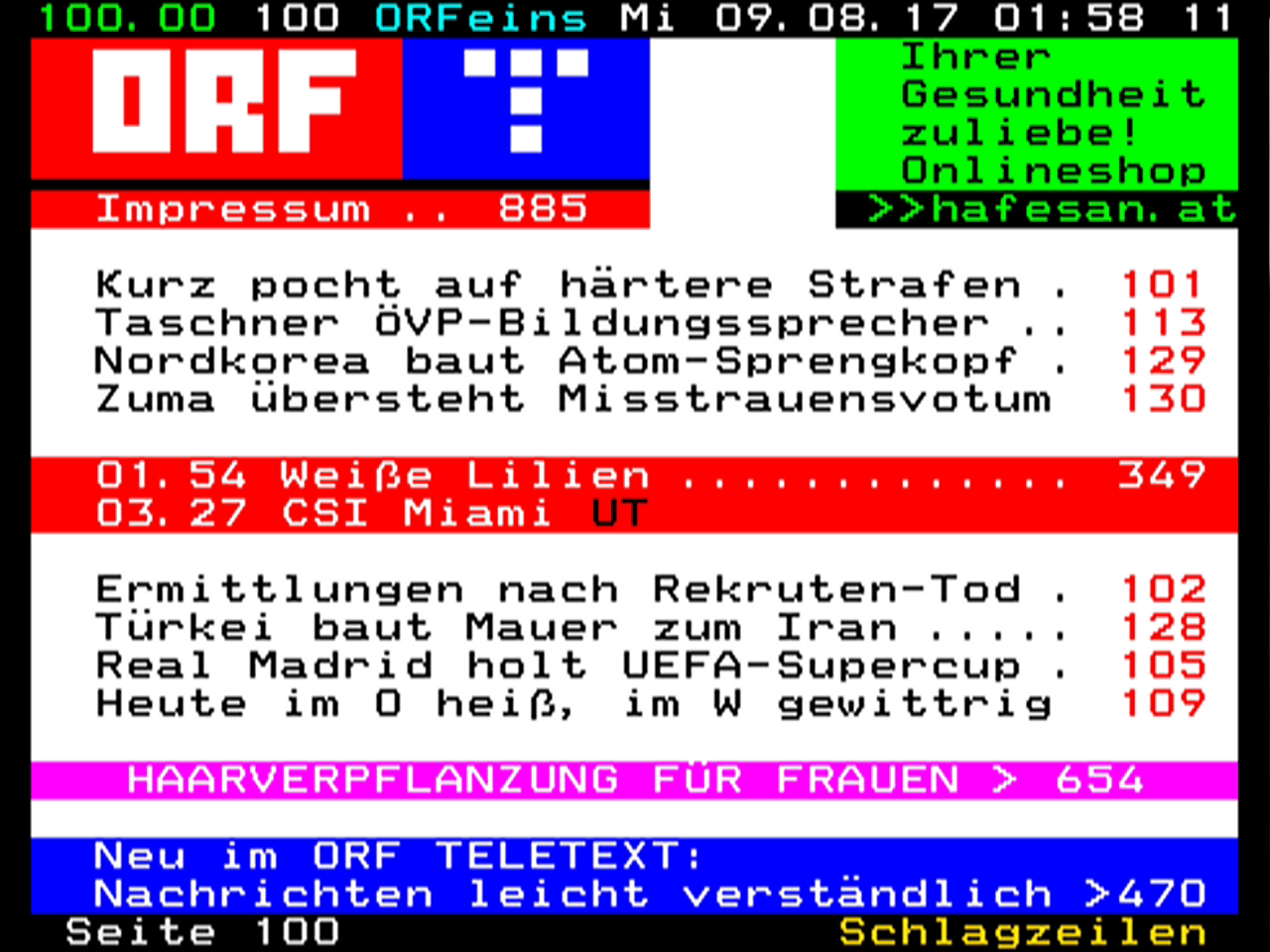
ORF teletext

- ORF Text (ORF1, ORF2, ORF3)
- ORF Sport Text (ORF Sport Plus)
- TW1 Text (TW1)
- 3satText (3sat)
- ATV TEXT (ATV)
- Puls 4 Text (Puls 4)
- Sat1 Österreich Text (Sat 1 Österreich)
- ProSieben Text Austria (Pro 7 Österreich)
- kabel eins text Austria (Kabel 1 Österreich)
- RTLtext AT (RTL Österreich)
- RTL II TEXT AT (RTL 2)
- Austria 9 Text (Austria 9)
- Tirol TV teletext

=== Bosnia and Herzegovina ===
- BHT1 Text (BHT1) - main state level public TV channel in Bosnia and Herzegovina
- FTV Text (FTV) - entity level public TV channel
- RTRS Text (RTRS) - entity level public TV channel

=== Bulgaria ===
- BNT Text (BNT1, BNT2, BNT3, BNT4) - main state level public TV channel in Bulgaria

=== Croatia ===
- HTV TTXT (Croatian Radiotelevision)
- Nova Text (Nova TV)
- RTL Text (RTL Televizija) (defunct)

=== Czech Republic ===
- Teletext ČT

==== Defunct services ====
- Teletext Nova
- Prima Teletext
- Prima Cool Teletext
- Prima Love Teletext
- Teletext TV Barrandov
- Teletext TV Óčko

=== Denmark ===
- DR Tekst-TV (Danmarks Radio)
- TV2 Tekst-TV (TV2 Adopted digital teletext, but abandoned the service in 2019)
- Viasat Tekst-TV (Viasat)

In fact, almost all TV channels in Denmark have teletext (called tekst-TV). Some of those services are entirely in Danish, while international channels (Discovery Channel, Animal Planet etc.) share their teletext with the other Scandinavian countries.

=== Finland ===
The Finnish national public broadcaster Yle has its own Teletext (Yle Teksti-TV). It shows news, sport and programme information round the clock. Theme pages on the weather, traffic, work and leisure. Teksti-TV also has news in English on page 190.

- Yle Teksti-TV (Yle)
- MTV3 Tekstikanava (MTV3) (defunct)
- TekstiNelonen (Nelonen) (defunct)
- Subteksti (Sub) (defunct)

=== France ===
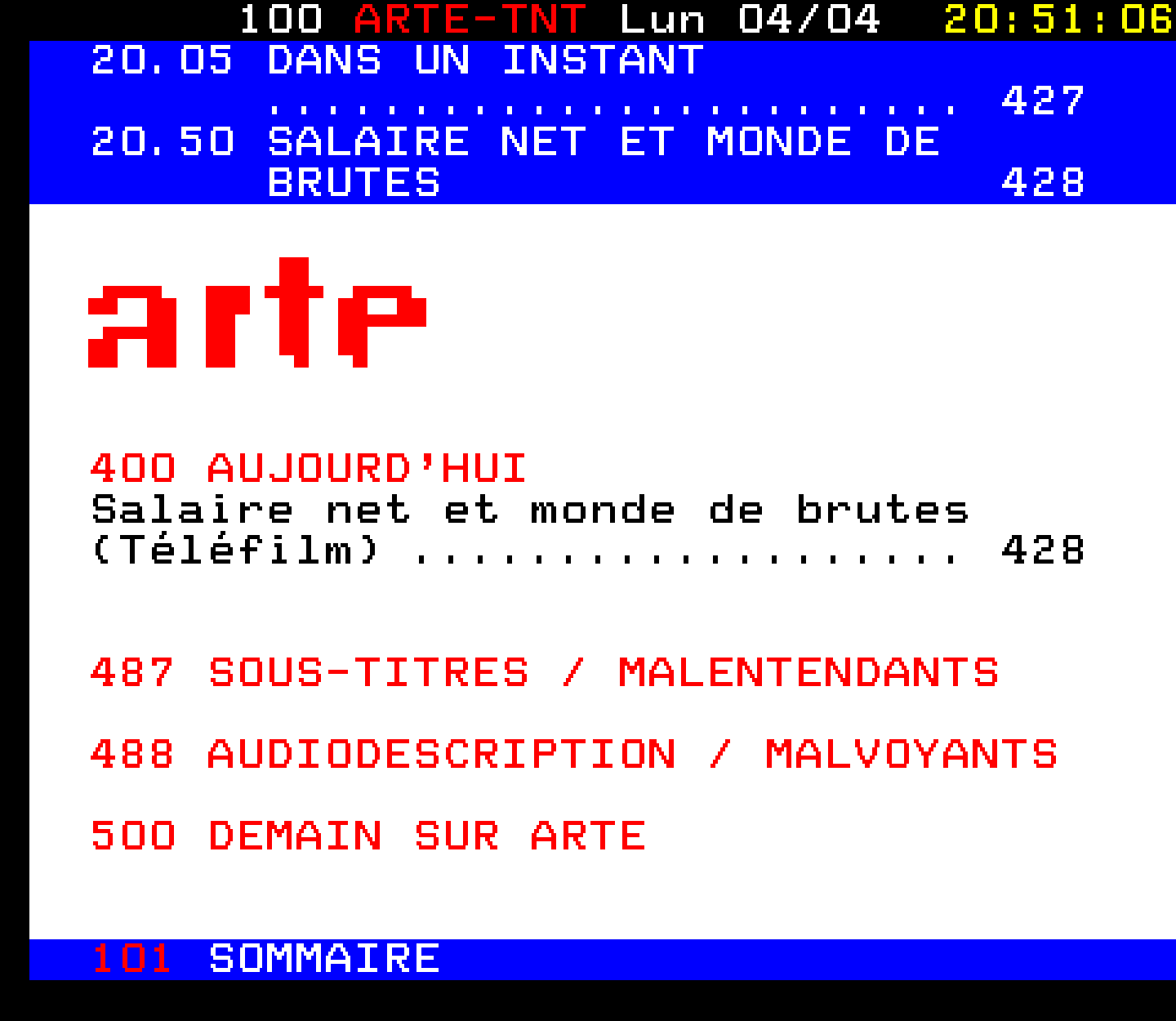
ARTE France last teletext "home" page

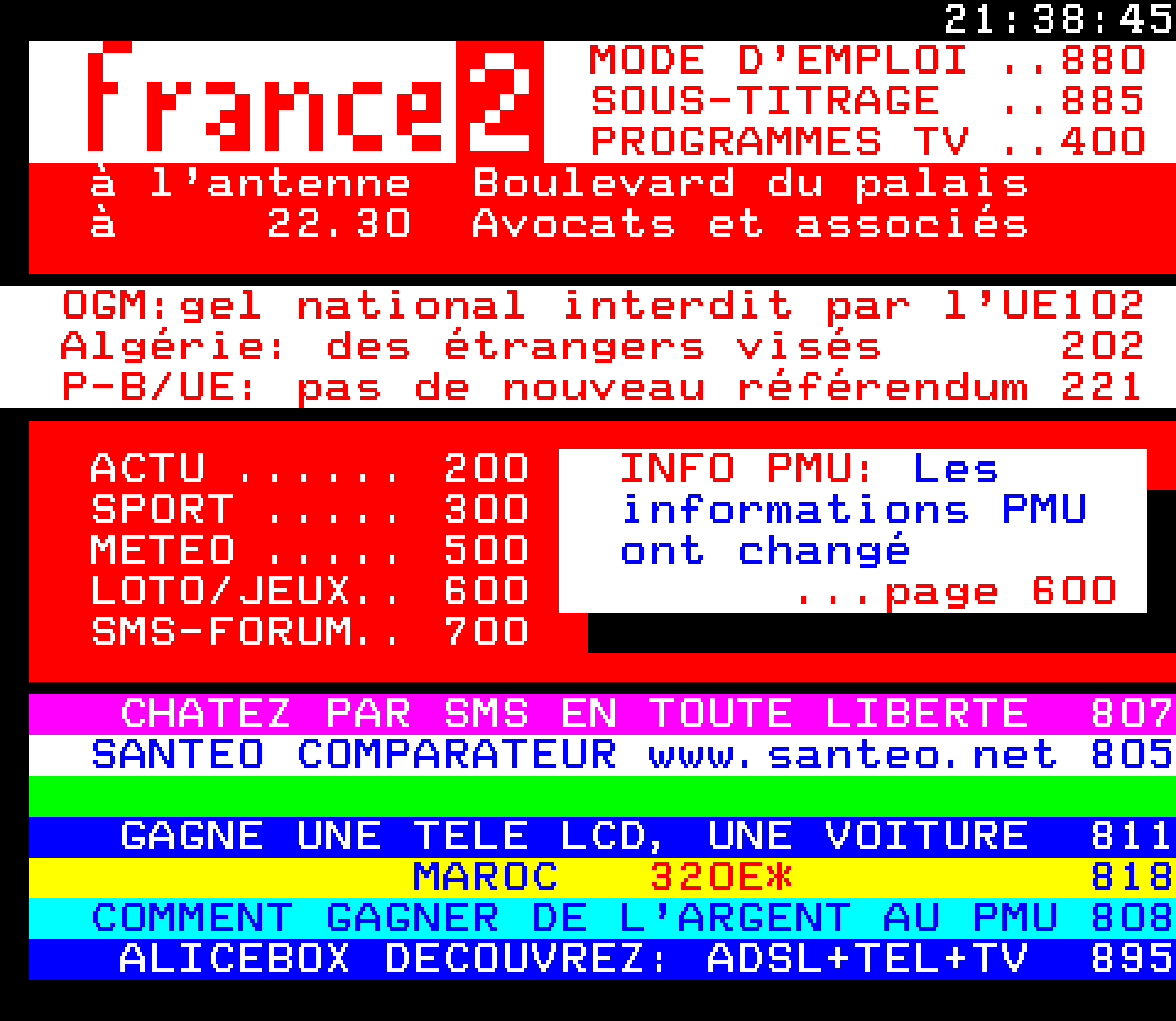
France 2 teletext home page

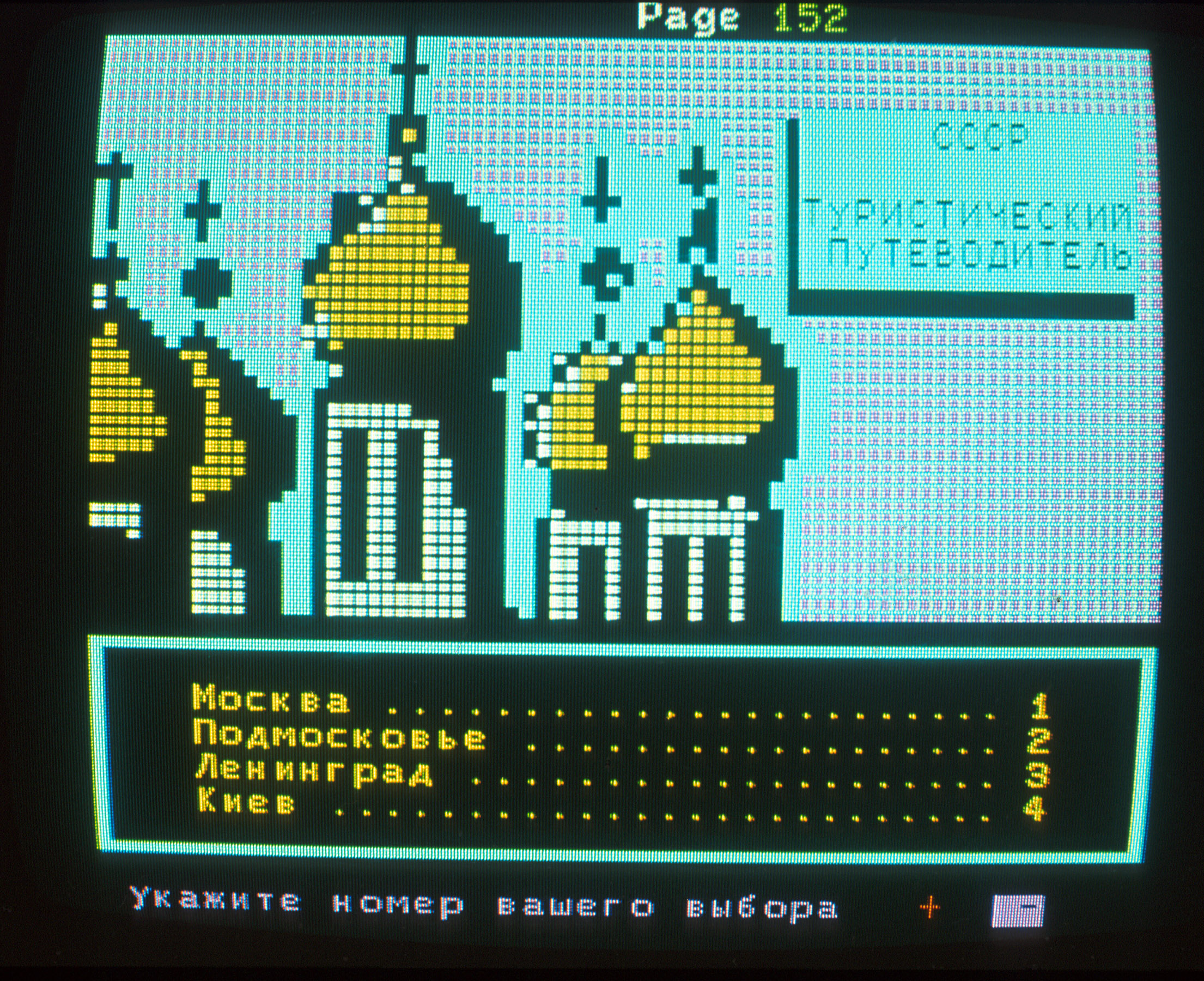
Antiope system page

In France, where the SECAM standard is used in television broadcasting, a teletext system was developed in the late 1970s under the name Antiope. It had a higher data rate and was capable of dynamic page sizes, allowing more sophisticated graphics. It was phased out in favour of standard teletext in 1991.

French channels have no more teletext:

- TF1 (defunct)
- France TV (defunct)
- Arte France (defunct)
- M6 (defunct)

=== Germany ===
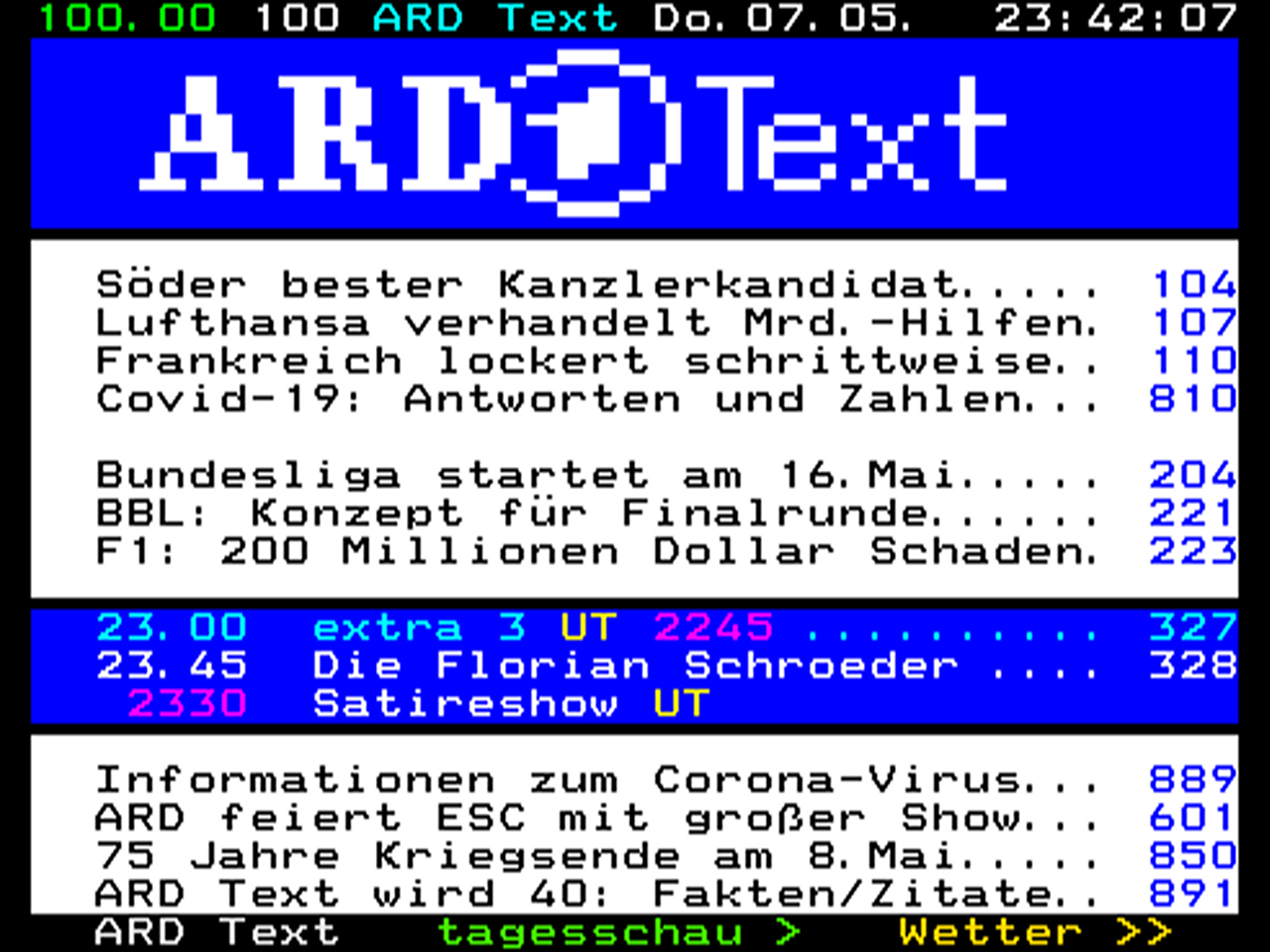
ARD teletext

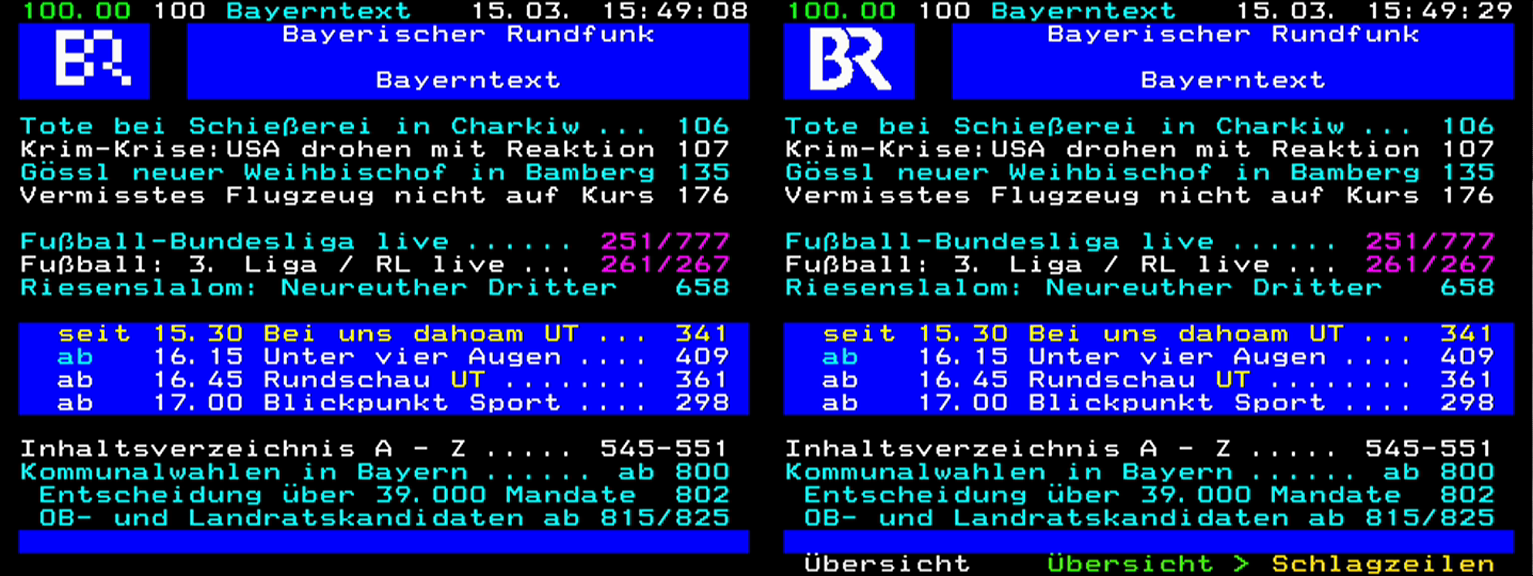
BR Level 1.0 and 2.5 teletext

Almost all German TV stations have teletext. Here are some of it:

- ARD (and all regional broadcasters)
- ZDF: (ZDF, ZDFneo, ZDFinfo)
- ARD & ZDF: KiKa, Phoenix
- RTL Deutschland: (RTL, VOX, RTL II, ... and others)
- ProSiebenSat.1: (ProSieben, Sat.1, kabel eins, ... and others)
- Tele 5
- Sport1
- Welt
- ... and others

=== Hungary ===
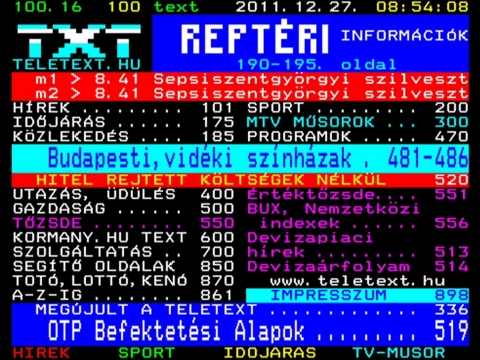
MTVA teletext

- MTVA TXT (M1, M2, M4 Sport, M5, Duna, Duna World / M4 Sport+)
- TV2 Text
- RTL text
- ATV, Hir TV (subtitling only)

=== Iceland ===
- RÚV textavarp (Icelandic public TV station RÚV) available to view at Textavarp.is

=== Ireland ===
- RTÉ Aertel (RTÉ One, RTÉ 2, RTÉjr and RTÉ News) Currently, the service is now shut down.

==== Defunct services ====
- threetext (TV3, 2001–201?)
- Téacs TG4 (TG4) (1999–20??)

=== Italy ===
State-owned RAI launched its Teletext service, called Televideo, in 1984.

- Televideo (RAI)

==== Defunct services ====
MTV Video was active between 2000 and 2010 (ex MusicFax in 1991), while "LA7 Video", the Teletext service of La7, was launched in 2001 but discontinued in 2014 (ex TMCvideo in 1992). Mediaset, the main commercial broadcaster, launched its Mediavideo in 1997 (ex Teletext in 1993) (discontinued in 2022).

- La7Video (La7)
- MTVVideo (MTV)
- Mediavideo (Mediaset)

=== Latvia ===
- TV3.lv (TV3 Latvia)

==== Defunct service ====
- Latvian Television used to have teletext, but as of March 2007, it is closed.

=== Luxembourg ===
- RTL Text (RTL Télé Lëtzebuerg)

=== Netherlands ===
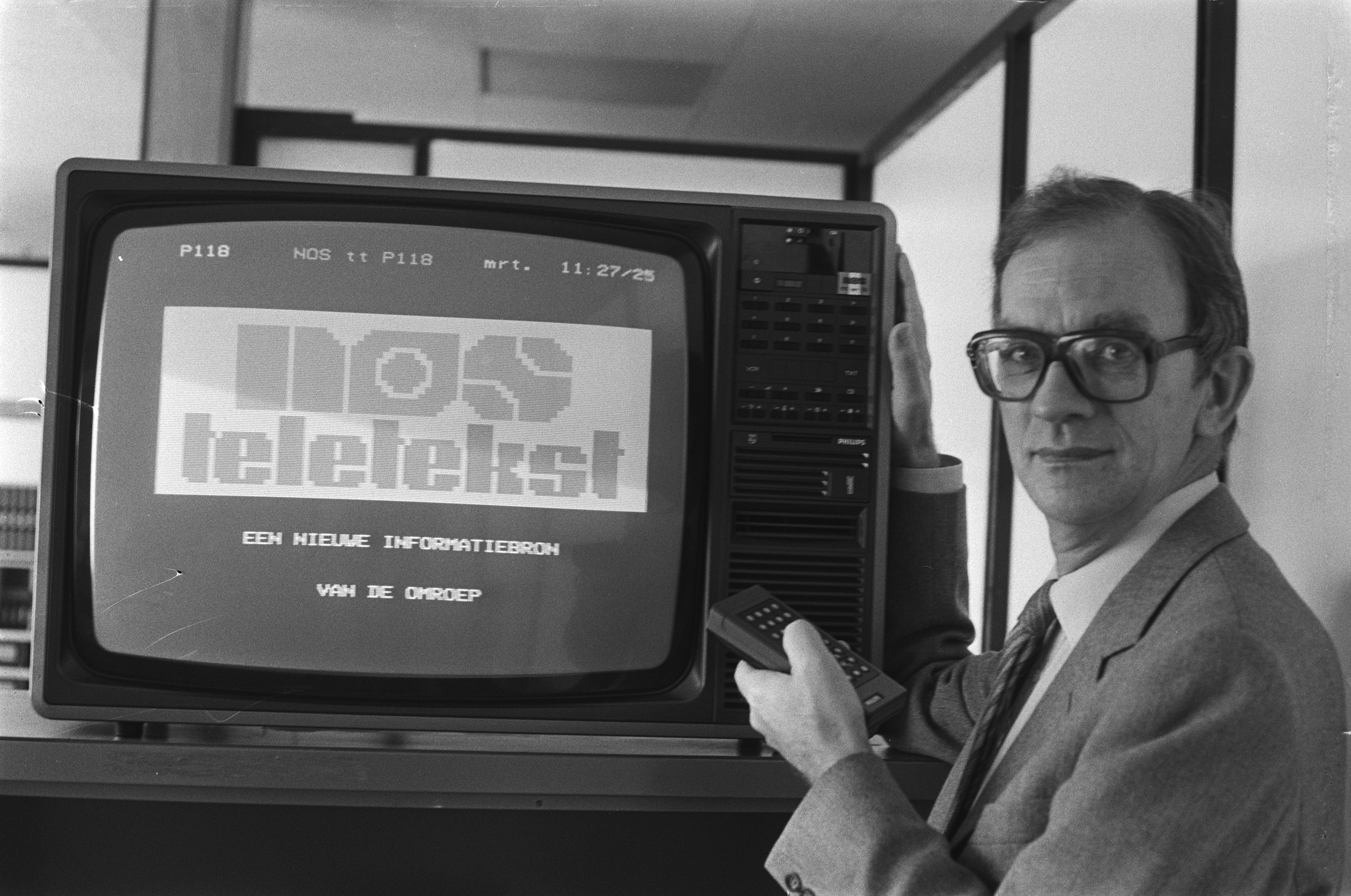
NOS Teletekst 1980

The Netherlands has run a regular Teletext service since the end of 1977 on the public broadcasting channels, and the commercial and regional channels that were later introduced also have their own services. Some of these channels also run Tekst-TV, which broadcasts a selection of their teletext pages as a regular TV broadcast, using improved fonts and background graphics, when no normal programming is shown.

- NOS Teletekst (NPO 1, NPO 2 and NPO 3)
- Omroep Brabant
- Omrop Fryslân Text
- RTV Drenthe
- RTV Oost
- TV Gelderland Teletekst

==== Subtitling only ====
- RTL Nederland Text (RTL 4, RTL 5, RTL7 and RTL 8)
- SBS Text (NET5 Text, SBS6 Text, Veronica Text. Main teletext service ended 1 January 2018.)

==== Over SSH ====
- NOS

==== Defunct service ====
- Fox Sports (ended 27 June 2019)

=== Norway ===
- Norwegian Broadcasting Corporation: NRK Tekst-TV
- TV 2: TV 2 Text
- TVNorge
- TV3

=== Pakistan ===
- PTV Teletext service

=== Philippines ===
- ABC Teletext/5Text/TV5 Teletext
- ABS-CBN Teletext
- GMA Teletext
- PeoplesText by PTV

=== Poland ===
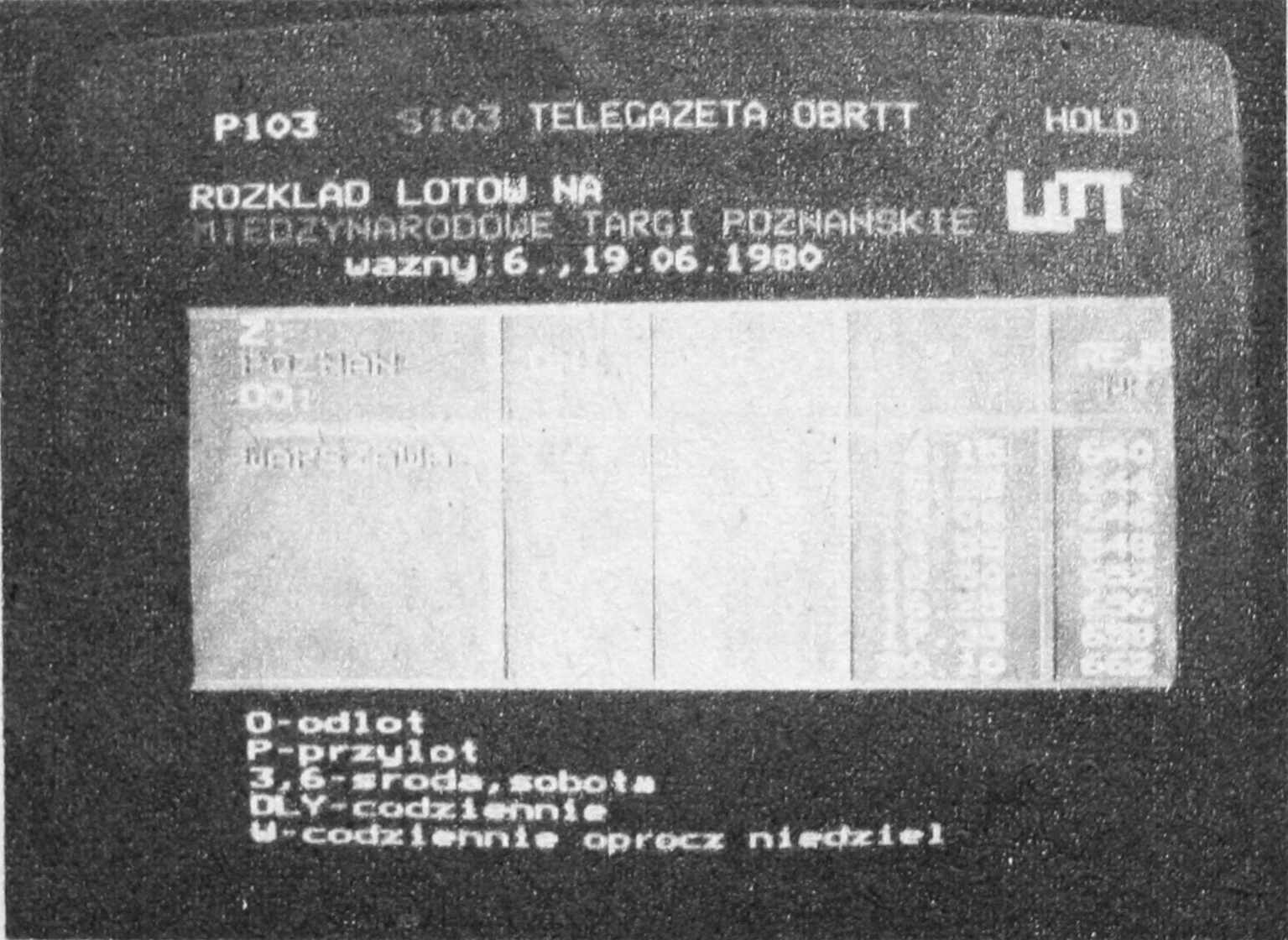
Telegazeta teletext page in 1980

- Telegazeta (Telewizja Polska)
- Gazeta TV Polsat (Polsat)
- Gazeta TV4 (TV4)
- Telestrony (TVN)
- Mediatext 5 (Tele5)
- Mediatext 1P (Polonia 1)
- 4fun.tv Text

=== Portugal ===
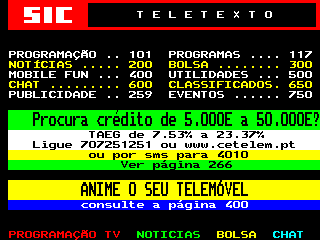
SIC teletext

- RTP Texto (Rádio e Televisão de Portugal)
- SIC Teletexto (SIC)
- Teletexto TVI (TVI)

=== Romania ===
- Teletext TVR (TVR 1, TVR1 HD, TVR 2, TVR2 HD, TVR 3, TVRi)

==== Discontinued services ====
- CNM Text (Național TV, Național 24 Plus, Favorite TV, CineEst, Boomerang, TV Market)
- Antena Group Teletext (Antena 1, Antena Stars, Antena 3, Happy Channel, ZU TV)

=== Russia ===
A screenshot of Teletext on TV Centre, (Note: This TV does not support Cyrillic.)

- Channel One
- Russia 1 (subtitles only)
- Match TV (subtitles only)
- NTV
- Channel 5
- Russia K (subtitles only)
- Karusel (subtitles only)
- REN TV (subtitles only)
- CENTR-INFO (TV Center)
- STS (subtitles only)
- Domashny (subtitles only)
- TV-3 (subtitles only)
- Friday! (subtitles only)
- Zvezda (subtitles only)
- TNT (subtitles only)
- 2x2 (subtitles only)
- Mir (subtitles only)
- Soyuz (subtitles only)
- Che! (subtitles only)
- STS LOVE (subtitles only)
- TNT4 (subtitles only)
- Kuhnya TV (subtitles only)
- Auto Plus (subtitles only)
- Animal Planet (subtitles only)
- Nickelodeon (subtitles only)
- IZ.RU (subtitles only)
- Muzika Pervogo (subtitles only)
- Super! (subtitles only)
- Match! Strana (subtitles only)

==== Defunct services ====
- 1 kanal Ostankino
- ORT
- 4 kanal Ostankino
- Rossiskije University
- RTR
- MTV Russia (2006–2008)
- 2x2
- Russia-Kuban
- Peterburgksiy teletext (TNT-Peterburg, Peterburg - 5 kanal, Regionalnoe televidenie)
- Sevastopolskiy teletext (NTS)
- Nizhegorodskiy teletext (NTR, NNTV, ORT)
- Prima-TV
- Stolitca
- 31 kanal
- TV-6
- MTK
- Sluzhba Teletext (M1)

=== Serbia ===
- TeletextB92 (B92)
- Prva Teletekst (Prva Srpska Televizija)
- Happy teletext Happy TV
- Pink Teletekst (RTV Pink)
- RTS Teletekst (RTS 1, RTS 2)
- RTV Teletekst (RTV1 RTV2)
- Sport Klub TXT
- RTV Studio B TXT
- Arena Sport Teletext (Arena Sport 1)

==== Defunct services ====
- BK Videotext (BKTV)
- Super TV Teletext (Super TV)
- Enter Teletext (TV Enter)
- 3K Text (RTS 3K)
- Avala text (Avala)

=== Slovakia ===
- defunct STV text (Slovenská televízia, closed 1 March 2026)
- defunct Markízatext (Markíza)
- defunct JOJ text (TV JOJ)

=== Slovenia ===
- MMC Teletekst (Radiotelevizija Slovenija)

=== South Africa ===
- Teledata (only available on SABC 2; rarely updated)

=== Spain ===
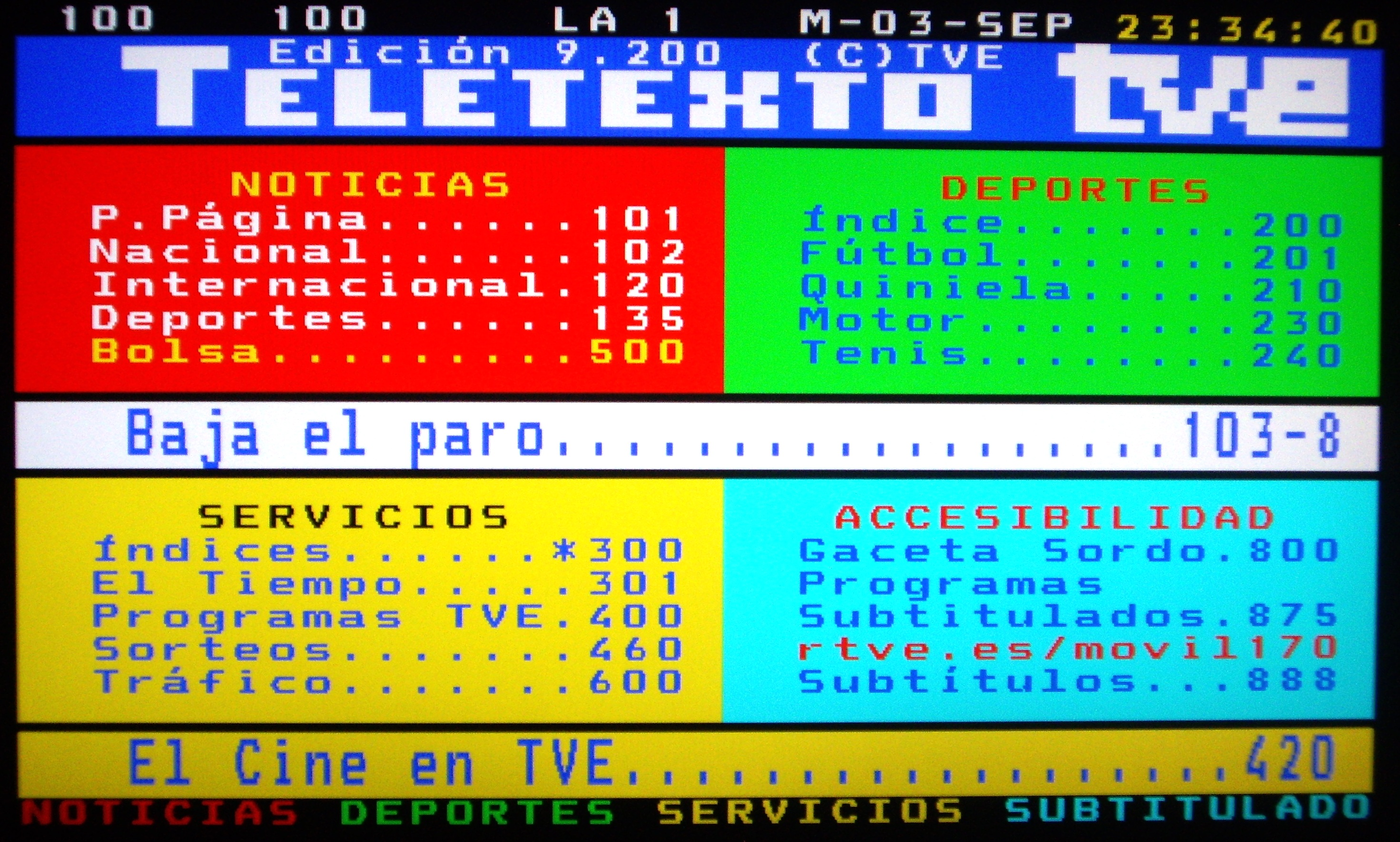
A screenshot of Teletexto in Spain

- Teletexto TVE (Televisión Española since 1988)
- Teletexto AtresMedia (Antena 3, laSexta)
- Teletexto Mediaset (Telecinco, Cuatro, FDF)
- Teletexto Televisió de Catalunya
- Teletexto Canal Sur
- Energy (only for subtitles)
- Divinity (only for subtitles)
- Boing (only for subtitles)
- BeMad (only for subtitles)

==== Defunct services ====
- Telemadrid (1991–2013)
- Televisión de Galicia (1995–2018)

=== Sweden ===
- SVT Text (Sveriges Television)

==== Defunct services ====
- Kanal 5 Text (Kanal 5)
- TV3 Text (TV3)
- TV6 Text (TV6)
- TV4 Text (TV4)

=== Switzerland ===
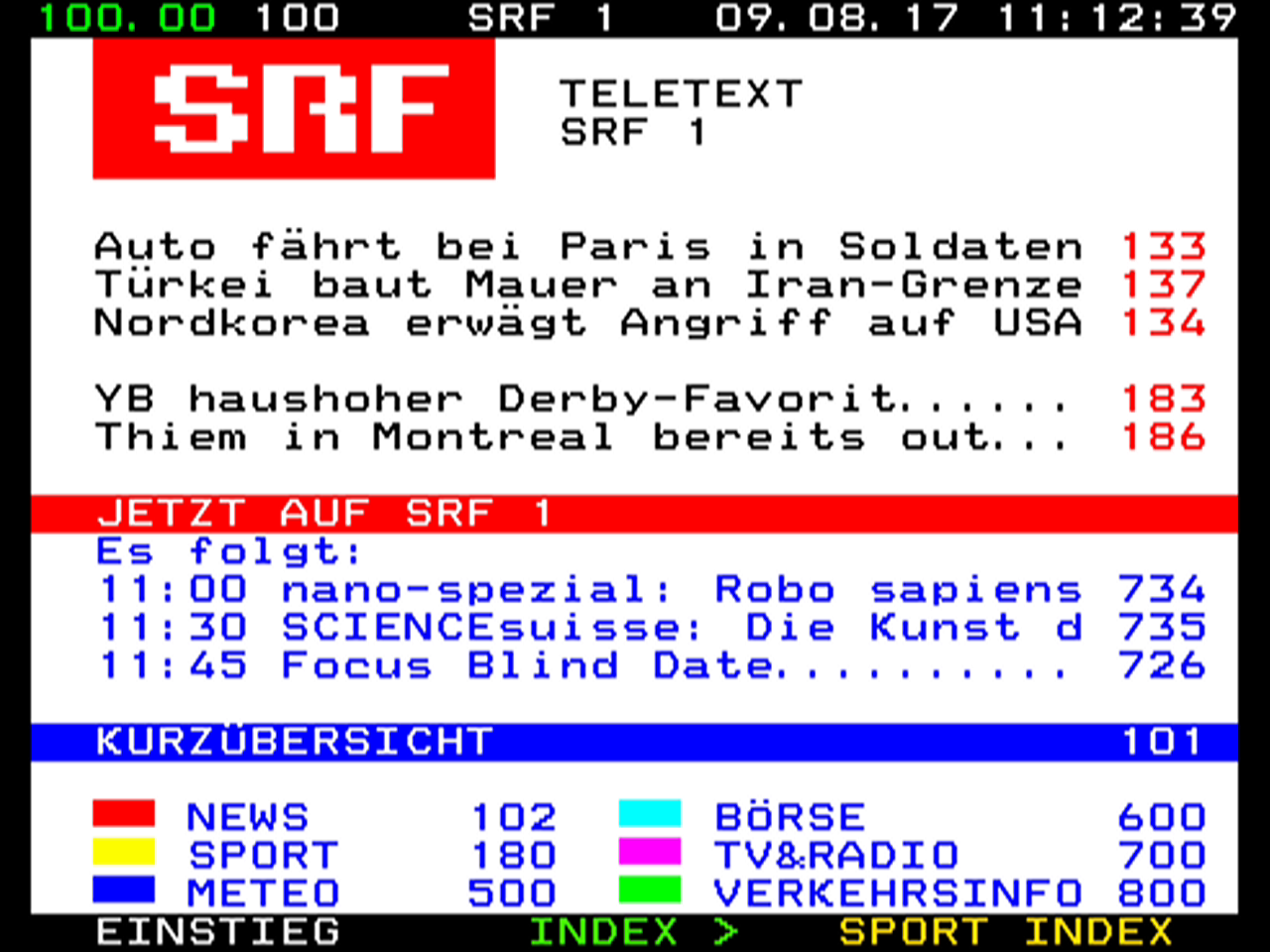
SRF teletext

- TELETEXT (Made by SWISS TXT for all national TV stations, including SF, TSR and TSI).
- 3+ TEXT (3+)
- RTL II TEXT CH(RTL 2)
- SSF TEXT (Schweizer Sportfernsehen)

=== Turkey ===
- Telegün (TRT) The Teletext is available online at (Telegün) (in Turkish)

==== Defunct services ====
- D Text (Kanal D)
- ShowText (Show TV)
- Start Text (Star TV)
- AText (ATV)
- Tirol Text (Tirol TV)

=== Ukraine ===
- INTERTEXT (The Teletext on Inter Media Group TV channels, also is available on-line at Інтертекст)

=== Vietnam ===
- Vitek and Dong Nai Television, collaborated to create the first Vietnamese language teletext in the summer of 2004.

== Countries with no teletext services ==
=== Worldwide ===
- BBCfax (BBC World), 1991–2012)
- CNN text (CNN), 1993–2006)
- TV5 text (TV5Monde), 1993–2013)

=== Australia ===
- Austext (Seven Network) (1982 – 30 September 2009)

=== Belarus ===
- Beltek (Belarus-1) (defunct from 2008)

=== Belgium ===
- RTBF-Teletexte (RTBF. Service ended during the week of 12 February 2024)
- VRT-Teletekst (VRT. Service ended 1 June 2016)

=== Bulgaria ===
- Televest (BNT 1) (defunct since 2017)
- Evrokom text (Evrokom NKTV) (defunct)
- Nova text (Nova TV) (defunct since 2012)

=== Canada ===
The CBC ran a teletext service, IRIS, accessible only in Calgary, Toronto and Montreal. It ran from 1983 until about 1986, and used the Canadian-developed Telidon system, which was developed in 1980. Like Antiope, Telidon allowed significantly higher graphic resolution than standard teletext.

=== Estonia ===
- ETV teletekst (Eesti Televisioon) (defunct)
- TV3.ee (TV3 Estonia) (defunct)

=== Greece ===
- NERIT (State television channels N1, N Sports) (defunct, no longer operational.)
- Mediatext (Mega Channel, Star Channel, Sports TV, Extra3) (defunct)
- Newsphone Hellas (ANT1, Alpha TV, Alter Channel, MAD TV) (defunct)
- Metromedia Group (Vergina, Nickelodeon, Rise, Smile, Nickelodeon Plus, Super TV Halkidiki, Ionian Channel, Atlas TV) (defunct)

=== Indonesia ===
- TVRI-Text (TVRI, 1994–2002)
- RCTI Seputar (RCTI, 1994–2002)

=== Israel ===
- Teletext (Israeli Educational Television, 1982–2014)

=== Japan ===
- Telemo Japan (NHK)
- TV Asahi Data Vision (TV Asahi) (7 April 1986 – 24 July 2011)
- AXES4 (Nippon TV) (1985 – 31 March 2007)
- Tokyo Data Vision (TBS)
- Fuji TV
- Tokyo Metropolitan Television
- Nikkei Telepress (TV Tokyo)

=== Malaysia ===
- Beriteks (RTM) (1985–2000)
- Infonet (TV3) (1985–2008)

=== New Zealand ===
- TVNZ Teletext (TVNZ 1, TVNZ 2, TV3) (1984 – 2 April 2013)

=== Singapore ===
The teletext broadcast in Singapore on 12 March 2013.

- MediaCorp Teletext (MediaCorp TV Channel 5, MediaCorp TV Channel 8, MediaCorp Channel NewsAsia) (1 August 1983 – 30 September 2013)

=== Thailand ===
- ARMTEXT (Royal Thai Army Television Channel 5, operated by Tele-Information Co., Ltd.) (by 1990 – at least 1995)

=== United Kingdom ===
Teletext was created in the United Kingdom in the early 1970s. Different systems existed, but by the end of the decade they converged, with the creation of the World System Teletext (WST). WST remained in use for analogue broadcasts until 2012.

Service	Channel	Start	End	Notes
5 Text	Channel 5	1997	2011	
ATR Text	At the Races	200?	2013	
Anglia Text	ITV1 Anglia	1995	2004	
Border Text	ITV1 Border	1995	2004	
Carlton Plus	ITV1 Carlton	1995	2004	The service included the former Central and Westcountry regions from 1999
Ceefax	BBC One and BBC Two	1973	2012	The world's first Teletext system.
Centext	ITV Central	1995	1999	
FourText (formerly 4-Tel)	Channel 4	1982	2003	Known as 4-Tel until 2002
Grampian Text	STV Grampian	1995	2010	
Granada Text	ITV1 Granada	1995	2004	
HTV Wales Teletext +	ITV1 HTV Wales	1995	2004	
HTV West Teletext +	ITV1 HTV West	1995	2004	
LWT 600 Plus	ITV1 LWT	1995	2004	
Meridian	ITV1 Meridian	1995	2004	
MTVtext	MTV	1992	20??	
Music Box Teletext	Music Box	1984	1987	Incorporated into SuperText when Super Channel replaced Music Box.
NickText	Nickelodeon	2009	–	
ORACLE	ITV and Channel 4	1974	1992	
RacingUK	Racing UK	2005	2016	The UK's last Teletext system.
Parlifax	BBC Parliament	1996	20??	
Paramount Text	Paramount Comedy	1995	2004	
Sbectel	S4C	1982	2009	
Scot-Text	ITV1 Scottish TV	1995	2011	
Sci Fi Text	Syfy	1995	2000	
Sky Text	various BSkyB channels	1985	30 October 2013	
SuperText	Super Channel	1987	1998	
Teletext Ltd.	ITV1, Channel 4 and S4C	1993	2009	
Teletext Ltd.	Five	2002	2009	
Teletext on 4	Channel 4	2003	2009	
ToonText	Cartoon Network	1993	?	
Tyne Tees Television (teletext)	ITV1 Tyne Tees	1995	2004	
UTV Plus	ITV UTV	1995	20??	
Westcountry Text	ITV Westcountry	1995	1999	
Yorkshire Television Text	ITV1 Yorkshire Television	1995	2004	

==== Ceefax ====
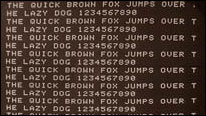
Early Ceefax test transmission

The first test transmissions were made by the BBC in 1972–74, with the name Ceefax ("see facts"). The Ceefax system went live on 23 September 1974 with thirty pages of information. Due to the adoption of a common teletext standard (WST), the Ceefax system ceased in 1976. The name was retained for the service itself, that continued after that year using the WST standard.

==== Oracle ====
ORACLE was first broadcast on the ITV network in the mid-late 1970s. Due to the adoption of a common teletext standard (WST), the ORACLE system ceased in 1976. The name was retained for the service itself, that continued after that year using the WST standard.

=== United States ===
- AgText (Kentucky Educational Television, 1984–1998)
- Datavizion (WHA-TV/Discovery Channel, 1980s)
- Electra (WKRC-TV/Superstation WTBS/SPN, 1980s–1993)
- ExtraVision (CBS, 1983–1986)
- Infotext (WHA-TV/Discovery Channel, 1980s)
- KeyFax (WTBS/WFLD-TV, 1980s)
- NBC Teletext (NBC, 1983–1985)
- Tempo Text (WTBS/SPN, 1980s–1993)
- Time Teletext (1980s)

== United States ==
Adoption in the United States was hampered due to a lack of a single teletext standard and consumer resistance to the high initial price of teletext decoders. Throughout the period of analogue broadcasting, teletext or other similar technologies in the US were practically non-existent, with the only technologies resembling such existing in the country being closed captioning, TV Guide On Screen, and Extended Data Services (XDS).

A version of the European teletext standard designed to work with the NTSC television standard used in North America was first demonstrated in the US in 1978 by station KSL in Salt Lake City, Utah, premiered a teletext service using Ceefax. They were followed by American television network CBS, which decided to try both the British Ceefax and French Antiope software for preliminary tryouts for a teletext service, using station KMOX (now KMOV) in St. Louis, Missouri as a testing ground.

CBS decided on Antiope and mounted a large market trial in Los Angeles in partnership with NBC and Public Broadcasting Service (PBS) Public television. Services premiered simultaneously on station KNXT (now KCBS-TV), KNBC and KCET in Los Angeles. All three services included an array of local news and information services. KCET's service also included service components for use in schools.

=== NABTS ===
Later, an official North American standard of teletext, called NABTS (North American Broadcast Teletext Specification) was developed in the early 1980s by Norpak, a Canadian company. NABTS provided improved graphic and text capability over WST, but was quite short-lived. This was mainly due to the expensive cost of NABTS decoders, costing in the thousands of dollars upon their release to the public. NABTS, however, was adopted for a short while by American TV networks NBC & CBS throughout the early-to-mid 80s, CBS using it for their short-lived ExtraVision teletext service, which premiered after the early Antiope & Ceefax trials by CBS & KNXT, and NBC, who had a NABTS-based service called NBC Teletext for a very short time in the mid-1980s. NBC discontinued their service in 1985 due to the cost of NABTS decoders not dropping to an affordable level for the consumer public.

The NABTS protocol received a revival of sorts in the late 90s, when it was used for the datacasting features of WebTV for Windows under Windows 98, and for Intel's now-defunct InterCast service (also for Windows as well), using a proper TV tuner card (such as the ATI All-In-Wonder or Hauppauge's Win-TV).

=== 1990s: InterCast ===
InterCast was a modern teletext-like system created by Intel in 1996, using a TV tuner card installed in a desktop PC running Windows with the InterCast Viewer software. The software would receive data representing HTML pages via the VBI (Vertical Blanking Interval) of a television channel's video, while displaying in a window in the InterCast software the TV channel itself. The HTML data received would then be displayed in another window in the Intercast software. It usually was extra supplemental information relevant to the TV program being viewed, such as extra clues for the viewer during a murder mystery show, or extra news headlines or extended weather forecasts during a newscast.

NBC, as well as The Weather Channel, CNN and M2 (now MTV2), utilized InterCast technology to complement their programming. InterCast, however, fell into disuse, and Intel discontinued support of InterCast a few years later.

=== WaveTop ===
Another service in the US similar in delivery and content to teletext was the WaveTop service, provided and operated by the Wavephore Corporation. It used the same types of InterCast-compatible TV tuner cards, and used an application that ran under Windows, like InterCast. In fact, WaveTop software was also bundled with TV tuner cards that had InterCast software bundled with them as well.

However, Wavetop was an independent service from InterCast, and wasn't a complementary service to a television program or channel like the latter. In fact, viewing television with a TV card was not possible while the WaveTop software was running, since the software utilized the TV tuner card as a full-time data receiver.

WaveTop provided content from several different providers in the form of HTML pages displayed in the WaveTop software, such as news articles from the New York Times, weather information provided by The Weather Channel, and sports from ESPN. It also delivered short video clips, usually commercials, that could be viewed in the software as well.

When it was in operation, WaveTop's data was delivered on the VBI of local public TV stations affiliated with PBS through their PBS National Datacast division, that the WaveTop software tuned the TV card to in order to receive the service.

=== Guide+ ===
Yet another service in the U.S. that relied on data delivery via the VBI like teletext, was the Guide+ (Guide Plus, also referred to as GuidePlus+ as well) service provided and developed by Gemstar. There were several models of television sets made throughout the 90s by Thomson Consumer Electronics under the RCA and General Electric brands that had built-in Guide+ decoders. Guide+ was an on-screen interactive program guide that provided current TV schedule listings, as well as other information like news headlines. Some Guide+ equipped sets from RCA even had an IR-emitting sensor that could be plugged into the back of the TV, to control a VCR to record programs which could be selected from the on-screen Guide+ listings. In some ways, this was very similar to the Video Programming by Teletext|Video Programming by Teletext (VPT), Video Program System (VPS), and Programme Delivery Control (PDC) features of British/European teletext.

Guide+ was a free service, supported by advertisements displayed on-screen in the Guide+ menu and listing screens, not unlike banner ads displayed on web pages. Guide+ was delivered over the VBI of select local American TV stations.

Guide+ was discontinued by Gemstar in June 2004, and soon afterwards, Thomson dropped the Guide+ features from all RCA and GE television sets made afterward.

Guide+ in the United States was replaced by Gemstar with a similar service (delivered in the same fashion via VBI like Guide+), called TV Guide On Screen. A small number of televisions, DVD recorders, and digital video recorders were released with TV Guide On Screen capabilities. The service was discontinued in the US in 2013.

The Guide+ name and service was still used in Europe by Gemstar until that version of the service was phased out in 2016. The same service was known in Japan as G-Guide.

=== Star Sight ===
Similar to Guide+ was Star Sight, with its decoders built into TVs manufactured by Zenith, Samsung, Sony, Toshiba, Magnavox, and others. This was an electronic program guide service similar to Guide+, but was a service that relied on monthly subscription fees paid by the user, not from revenue gathered from on-screen advertisements like Guide+. Star Sight discontinued operations on 21 July 2003, due to a lack of subscribers to the service. Star Sight's data was also delivered on the VBI of local PBS stations through the PBS National Datacast division, much like how WaveTop was delivered as mentioned previously in this article.

== International ==
=== World System Teletext ===
World System Teletext (or WST) is the name of a standard for teletext throughout Europe today. Almost all television sets sold in Europe since the early '80s have built-in WST-standard teletext decoders as a feature.

It originally stems from the UK standards developed by the BBC (Ceefax) and the UK Independent Broadcasting Authority (ORACLE) in 1974 for teletext transmission, extended in 1976 as the Broadcast Teletext Specification.

With some tweaks to allow for alternative national character sets, and adaptations to the NTSC 525-line system as necessary, this was then promoted internationally as "World System Teletext".

It was accepted by CCIR in 1986 as CCIR Teletext System B, one of four recognized standards for teletext worldwide.

WST was also used for a short time in the US, with services provided throughout the late 1970s and early 1980s by several regional American TV networks (such as the University of Wisconsin–Madison's Infotext service in the mid-1980s, which was carried on several TV stations across Wisconsin (and nationally by The Discovery Channel), and Agtext, provided by Kentucky Educational Television and carried on KET's stations, both services providing agriculturally oriented information) and major-market U.S. TV stations (such as Metrotext, which was formerly carried on station KTTV in Los Angeles, and KeyFax, formerly on WFLD in Chicago).

WST-based service Electra

Perhaps the most prominent of American teletext providers was the Electra teletext service, using WST, which was broadcast starting in the early 1980s on the vertical blanking interval (VBI) of the American cable channel WTBS. Electra was owned and operated by Taft Broadcasting and Satellite Syndicated Systems (SSS). Electra ran up until 1993, when it was shut down due to Zenith, the prominent (and only) American TV manufacturer at the time offering teletext features in their sets decided to discontinue such features, as well as a lack of funding and lagging interest in teletext by the American consumer.

Zenith manufactured models of television sets in the US in the 1980s, most notably their Digital System 3 line, that had built-in WST teletext decoders as a feature, much like most British/European TV sets. Teletext services in the US like Electra could be received with one of these sets, but these were mostly more expensive higher-end sets offered by Zenith, possibly causing Electra (and American teletext in general) to never catch on with the public.

Australian company Dick Smith Electronics (DSE) also offered through their US distributors a set-top WST teletext decoder kit. The kit used as its core the same teletext decoding module (manufactured by UK electronics company Mullard) installed in most British TV sets, with additional circuitry to adapt it for American NTSC video, and to utilize it in a separate set-top box.

A significant reason for the demise of American teletext was when Zenith introduced built-in closed captioning decoders in TVs in the early '90s, as mandated by the FCC. It was not practical for Zenith to re-design their TV chassis models that previously had teletext decoder support to have both teletext and closed captioning support. So Zenith decided to drop the teletext features, therefore ending teletext service in the US in the early 1990s, considering Zenith was the only major manufacturer of teletext-equipped sets in the United States.
