= Televideo (disambiguation) =

TeleVideo Corporation is a U.S. company that achieved its peak of success in the early 1980s producing computer terminals.

Televideo may also refer to:

- TV/VCR combo (also known as a televideo), a device that combines a television and a video cassette recorder in a single unit
- Televideo (teletext), an Italian teletext service
- Videophone or two-way television used for instructional or conferencing purposes
