= InfoChammel =

Satirical mock television channel

- Headquarters: {{{location_country}}}
- Founders: Fred Furner (in-universe); Davy Force
- Services: Available via Roku, YouTube and Twitch
- Website: www.infochammel.com
- Launched: May 15, 2012
- Current status: Active

InfoChammel is a YouTube channel and webseries that satirizes traditional television channels, created by US animator and content creator Davy Force.

Much of the channel imitates retro teletext services and infomercials. Since beginning as an intermittent webseries on YouTube, the channel has expanded to linear broadcasts on Roku and interactive livestreams on Twitch.

== History ==
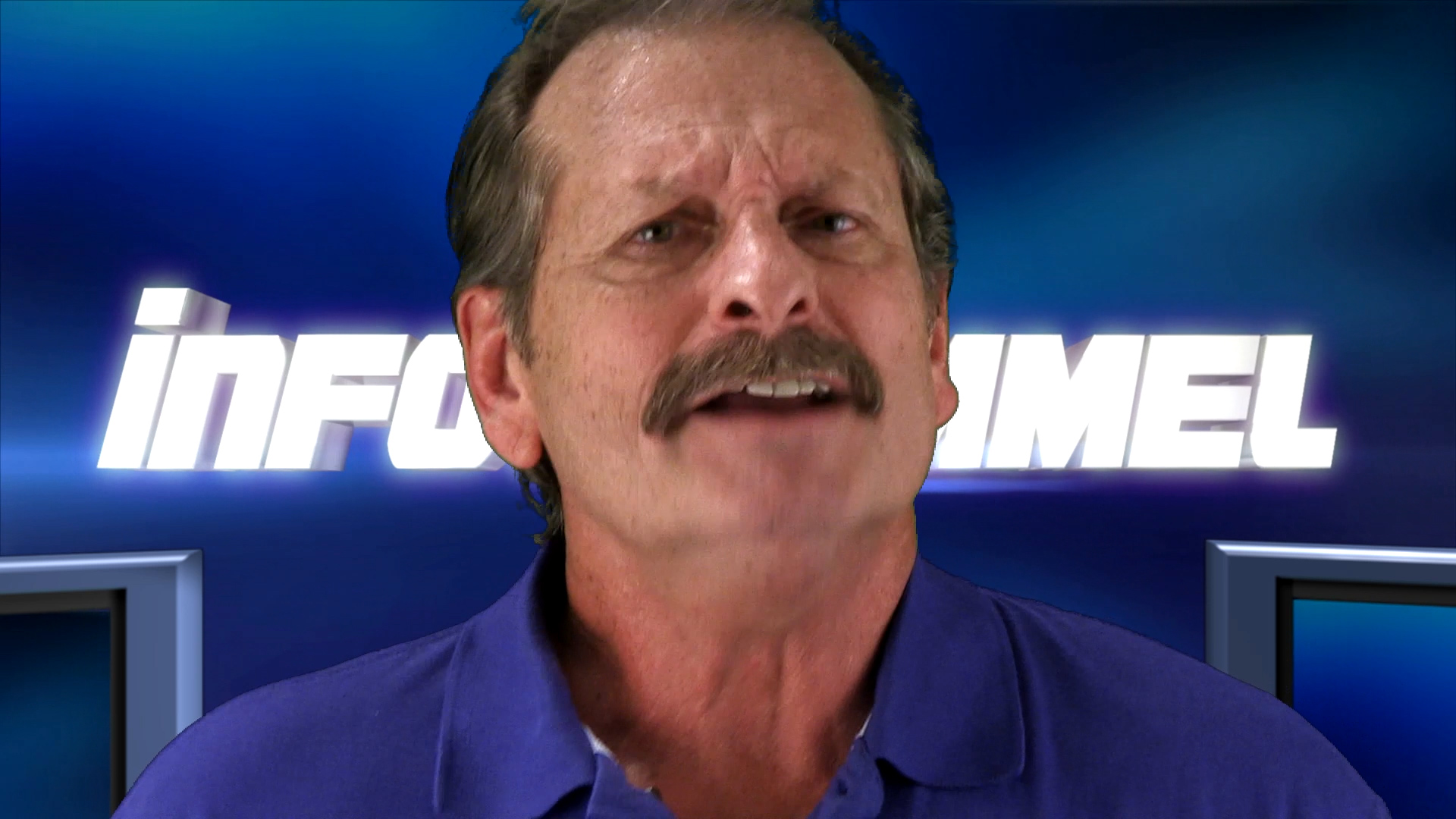
Fred Furner of InfoChammel Network

Infochammel originally started as a webseries of videos on YouTube parodying advertorial datacast networks, early cable television, and teletext services reminiscent of Ceefax (UK) and ExtraVision (US). The series is created by Davy Force, an animator who has worked previously for Tim and Eric Awesome Show, Great Job! and as long-running electronic musician "TV Sheriff".

The fictional in-universe history of Infochammel is that it was first created in 1985 by Fred Furner, a telecommunications innovator of the 1970s under the name "I-CHAM", with Furner's invention "HC2K Techno-Loc" capable of transmitting information instantaneously to the viewer. After a freak explosion destroyed the I-CHAM laboratories, the company ceased operation. Despite this, Fred Furner continued to work on his HC2K project while taking up numerous day jobs to support himself. In 2012, Davy Force contacted Furner to partner up and utilise Furner's "HC2K Techno-Loc" technology for a new platform, and purchased it for "16.7 million colors", thus beginning Infochammel.

The first InfoChammel video was released on YouTube in 2012 as a "test signal" programme being interrupted by outlandish technical difficulties (including a rattlesnake and a giant letter "B"). From 2012, videos would be uploaded intermittently of various InfoChammel text shows and programmes, and later as 30-minute "Powerfeed" compilations of material. In 2016, InfoChammel would eventually be broadcast on digital television via Amazon Video and Roku.

From 2017, Infochammel began streaming from Twitch. The Twitch streams, titled "Info Live Now" would feature shows presented by Davy Force in different characters either playing music or chatting with viewers via phone. Viewers could also interact with the streams via the Infochammel website's "chammelback" chat or submit drawings to be broadcast via the "chammelstrator".

On January 12, 2022, InfoChammel was showcased in Times Square, New York. InfoChammel content was shown on Times Square billboards while Davy Force interviewed passers-by about their InfoChammel experiences.

== Content ==
Branded "Anti-tainment" by channel creator Davy Force, InfoChammel's content largely consists of brightly coloured teletext "text shows", lampooning newspaper classifieds or simply broadcasting positive messages and trivia to the viewer. Some of the more bizarre text shows include Bleepers, which focuses on replacing profanity-laded sentences with positive remarks and Dogs About U and For Cats Only, teletext shows specifically aimed at housepets. In-between text shows are InfoChammel station IDs or infomercials promoting Infochammel and its potential positive influence on viewers.

Other InfoChammel programmes consist of non-engaging content consisting of either stock footage edited together or hosts speaking nonsensical banter. These include Feminiute (a one-minute news show), Infostories (short films where the viewer determines their own plot), and EROS Video Restaurant (a late-night "food porn" show). Creator Davy Force has said that the intent behind InfoChammel's non-engaging content was that "if we’re just going to have 500 channels of nothing, then here’s nothing, here’s what nothing looks like.". On May 16, 2022 (InfoChammel's tenth anniversary), InfoChammel released "FRED FURNER: SHAPING HDTV DESTINY", an autobiographical documentary movie about the channel's founder Fred Furner.

InfoChammel's "Info Live Now" streams are broadcast on Twitch every Thursday evening, and consist of Davy Force hosting a show where he interacts with his audience. Fans can also submit content in the form of their own text screens, or their own InfoChammel text shows. InfoChammel has a sister station titled "Primo Primetime HD", branded as InfoChammel's "premium service". In the real world, Primo showcases some of creator Davy Force's other animation and film projects packaged as a TV broadcast with Station IDs and bumpers.

Unlike traditional teletext which ran on low colour palettes and limited resolutions, InfoChammel's text shows are presented with high resolutions with full-motion animations that wouldn't have been feasible during the heyday of teletext. Infochammel's in-universe lore claims that it runs on "over a million colours". InfoChammel's lore also claims that the service runs on "HC2K Techno-Loc", a "proprietary signal" and "Transhypno Hyperlearning Neural Linked Television Signal Protocol" which enlightens the viewer with positive energy.

== Availability ==
InfoChammel can be watched on Roku, as a loop of the channel's "Powerfeed" compilations. InfoChammel's "Info Live Now" broadcasts are streamed on Twitch and YouTube every Thursday evening (Pacific Time Zone).
