= RTP Texto =

RTP Texto is the teletext service of Rádio e Televisão de Portugal. It began its services on 1 January 1997, though similar teletext services existed since the early 1980s.

== History ==
RTP conducted its first teletext experiments as early as 1982, using the French Antiope system. The service was broadcast on RTP2 from at least October 1982 to April 1983 from 9:30am to 6pm. This prototype service was used for the coverage of the 1983 Portuguese legislative election held on 25 April that year.

A full teletext service, this time named RTP Texto, was first announced in December 1996, initially with 200 pages, later aiming to double to 400. The service was entrusted to RTP Multimédia, a new subsidiary, which would also be in charge of its online services.

From 2001, it offered a chat service (TV Chat); its closure was announced on 18 November 2004, owing to the rise of text messages with swearing, which the RTP administration said that it violated its rules and that the situation became "unacceptable". In March 2006, it added subtitled to sports broadcasts. On 7 March 2008, automatic subtitles were added to Jornal da Tarde and Telejornal. In November 2008, Jornal 2 added automatic subtitles.
