= Teletext ČT =

Czech teletext service

Teletext ČT is a teletext service provided by Czech Television.

== History ==
The first teletext service in the Czech Republic was launched on 1 May 1988 under Czechoslovak Television. It was inspired by German and Austrian teletexts. Czech Television eventually started to provide teletext services for both its channels — ČT1 (Teletext ČT) and ČT2 (Teletext Express). When ČT 4 Sport was launched, it received its teletext called Teletext ČT4. On 1 February 2010 it started to provide teletext on ČT24, called Teletext ČT24. Teletext services of Czech Television managed to get dominant market share domination, as in 2010 its market share got over 70%. In 2021 TV Nova and Prima televize ceased their teletext services leaving Czech Television the only major teletext provider in the Czech Republic.

In February 2024 Czech Television launched a new version of Teletext ČT, built on internet technology.
