= Austext =

Australian teletext service

- Country: Australia
- Broadcast area: Sydney, Melbourne, Brisbane, Adelaide, Perth, Regional QLD via Seven; Regional: Victoria, Australian Capital Territory; Regional: New South Wales via Prime; Tasmania via Southern Cross
- Network: Seven Network; Prime Television (Relay); Southern Cross Television (Relay)

Ownership
- Owner: Seven Media Group

History
- Launched: 1982
- Closed: 30 September 2009; 16 years ago

Availability

Terrestrial
- Analog: Normally tuned to 7
- SD Digital: Channel 7, 77 (via Seven); Channel 6 (via Prime and Southern Cross)
- HD Digital: Channel 70 (via Seven); Channel 60 (via Prime and Southern Cross)

Austext is the former Australian teletext service based in Brisbane, Queensland. The service was carried and operated by the Seven Network and its affiliates over most of Australia. It carried news, financial information, weather, lottery results, a TV guide and other information, as well as closed captioning for programs.

The service was freely available for viewing on any television, computer or other device with teletext functionality and the ability to access and view Channel Seven, or one of Seven's regional affiliates Prime, GWN or Southern Cross.

== History ==
Seven first began testing the Teletext services in 1979, starting regular service on 4 February 1980 with useful information being transmitted in 1982 in Brisbane and Sydney. TCN, head station of the Nine Network and ATN's competitor, tried a teletext service in 1977, but as of 1979 it wasn't frequently updated due to the lack of teletext receivers.

In its early years, there were two separate services: 7-Text coming out of ATN in Sydney with a separate version for HSV-7 in Melbourne, and in Brisbane, SevenTel. In 1988, BTQ-7 became responsible for the national service and was renamed Austext.

Austext was shut down in September 2009.

== Content ==
The information available on Austext pages included the latest in news, weather, racing, general interests and a television guide. Also available are contact details for Austext and state deaf associations.

The news pages included the latest in business, national news, international news, sport, science and technology, and showbiz. The weather pages include same day forecast capital city temperatures, same day forecast conditions and minimum/maximum temperatures as well as current temperature, humidity, dew point, wind speed, wind direction, sunrise and sunset times, and an outlook for the next five days for major centres across Australia which was all supplied by the Bureau of Meteorology. The racing pages included a national TAB racing index which ceased operation on 4 August 2009. The general interest pages included items such as lottery results, daily horoscopes and a joke of the day. The service also carried a TV guide with listings for the Seven Network in its five metropolitan markets, as well as listings for other networks, both metropolitan and regional, until 2007 when they disappeared.

Closed captioning for programs on the Seven Network's channels are also included in the Austext system. When produced by the Australian Caption Centre, they were branded as "Supertext". To access closed captions through Austext, viewers enter the navigation code number 801 on an analog television or by pressing the Text, CC, Subtitle or a designated coloured button (depending on make and model) on their digital set top box or television.

== Closure ==
In July 2009 Seven announced that Austext would shut down on 30 September 2009. This was due to claims from the network that the technology had come to the end of its useful service life and is not commercially viable to replace. Seven also noted the wide availability of alternate sources of information now accessible to viewers such as Seven's own websites. Despite the closure, closed captioning services continued to remain available.

The onscreen closedown notice read:

The Seven Network started providing test teletext services commencing in 1977, with live services commencing in 1982 in Brisbane and Sydney.

The Austext service today is still provided using the original 1970s technology. This equipment has now reached the end of its lifespan.
Unfortunately, it is not possible to replace the existing Austext system with new equipment except at significant cost.
Austext is a free service and does not attract advertising revenue, so this is not commercially viable.
Seven is aware that Austext has many loyal supporters and we know that many of you will miss the Austext service. We sincerely regret any inconvenience the cessation of this service may cause and we have endeavoured to provide you with as much notice as possible.
Unlike when the service started, information currently available on Austext is now freely available from a number of alternative sources including over the internet via Yahoo7.

CLOSED CAPTIONING SERVICES will be unaffected and continue to be available on page 801.

== See also ==
- Ceefax
- List of teletext services
