= Infonet =

Malaysian teletext service

- Also known as: Beriteks
- Country of origin: Malaysia
- Original languages: Malay; English

Production
- Production company: New Straits Times (as of first year of service)

Original release
- Network: TV3; RTM1; RTM2
- Release: 2 June 1985 – 1 January 2008

Infonet was a Malaysian teletext service. It was formerly known as Beriteks (a combination of the Malay word Berita, meaning news, and Teks, which is a borrowed word from the English language meaning text). This teletext system was launched in early 1985 by TV3, before starting on the RTM channels later in the year. The service at launch was operated by the New Straits Times.

While RTM1 and RTM2 were still transmitting Teletext, the contents of the transmission were different from those offered by TV3's service, which was then also transmitted under the name Beriteks. In the case of RTM1 in its first year, it carried information on foodstuff prices and information on eateries and shopping. As Beriteks is carried on RTM and TV3, they are treated "as a service" and not for competition.

RTM1 and RTM2 has ceased teletext transmission as of 2000, and TV3 was the only TV station in Malaysia transmitting Teletext. None of TV3's sister companies, 8TV, TV9 and NTV7, are transmitting teletext.

Infonet ceased operation from 1 January 2008. Therefore, there are now no TV networks, channels and stations transmitting Teletext in Malaysia.

Infonet uses the BBC Ceefax teletext system.
