= SVT Text =

Sveriges Television's teletext service

SVT Text is the teletext service of Sveriges Television. It started broadcasting on 12 March 1979 as the first regular teletext service outside of the United Kingdom.

Content includes program listings, news, sports results, film reviews and more. At night, due to a drop in staff, the TT news agency is in charge of coverage. The service is also available online at SVT's website and as a mobile application, the last of which operated by a third party.

== History ==
SVT Text opened on 12 March 1979 with the subtitling function; Torbjörn Jacobsson worked at the service from November 1980 (at which time there were only 18,000 teletext-capable sets in Sweden) until his retirement on 30 April 2017. Before the advent of digital technologies, an estimated three million viewers accessed the service daily; by 2014, it had fallen to two million; its online copy was among the most visited websites in Sweden.

On 4 March 2005, the service erroneously said for a few hours that Pope John Paul II died, weeks before he actually did. It was confirmed that the early obituary was due to his illness, which eases preparation for the event of the death of a personality.

Despite its popularity, some sections, as of 2017, were known for their lack of updates, and there is normally one person in charge of the news and sports sections. The most popular pages are the homepage (page 100) and the sports results service (page 377). As of 2018, it was the world's oldest active teletext service still in operation, with one out of six Swedes accessing it. In March 2019, it celebrated its fortieth anniversary.

In September 2022, SVT Text closed its business and stock market pages due to high licensing costs. Only the closing prices for each day are reported.

As of January 2024, there are still people trusting the service, as it is a source of straightforward information. Plans for its 45th anniversary were being made. Carl-Johan Svensson, a history teacher at the Jönköping University, made a book on the history of teletext for the occasion. Erik Aldaeus, who has been working since 2001, is surprised that the service still has its followers, in a time where push notifications are commonplace.
