= Programme Delivery Control =

Television standard to indicate start and end of programmes

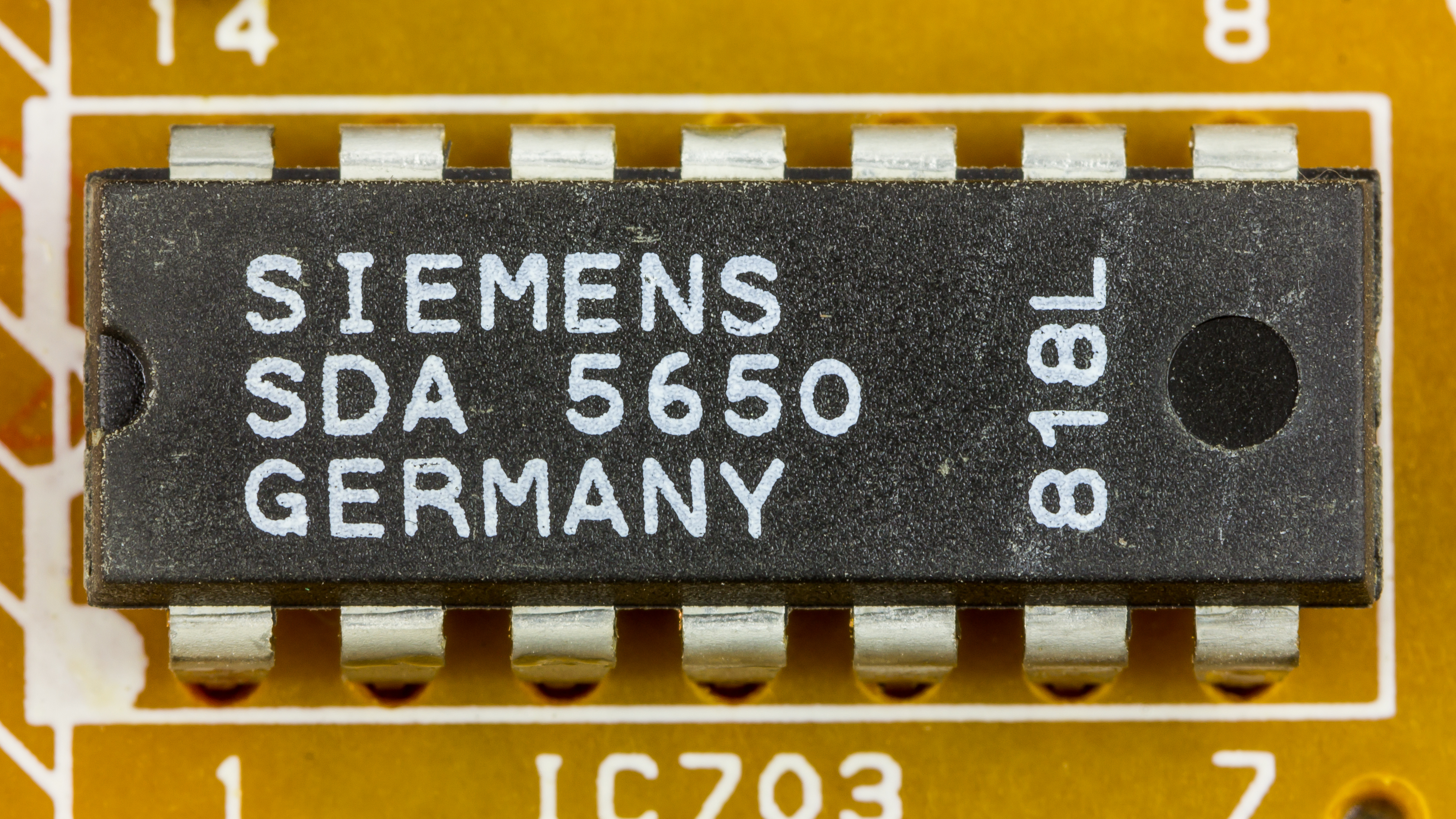
VPS / PDC-plus Decoder IC by Siemens.

Programme delivery control (PDC) is specified by the standard ETS 300 231 (ETSI EN 300 231), published by the European Telecommunications Standards Institute (ETSI). This specifies the signals sent as hidden codes in the teletext service, indicating when transmission of a programme starts and finishes.

PDC (also known as Enhanced Teletext Packet 8/30 Format 2) is often used together with StarText, enabling the user to select a programme to record using specially coded teletext programme listings. The combination of features is often called PDC/StarText.

In Germany and some other European countries, the older standard video programming system (VPS) is in use also known as format 2. Effectively, the two systems do the same thing and most modern VCRs and stand-alone DVD recorders work with both signals.

In digital TV (see Freeview+), the feature Accurate Recording (AR) that was based on the PDC specification for analogue recording devices is now used for a DVB-SI event based scheduling system. This was due to the BBC discontinuing the Ceefax service.

== PDC Packets ==
PDC is transmitted once a second in special packets addressed as magazine 8 and text row 30. Since this row is not displayable it does not interfere with normal pages. Packet 8/30 has various formats specified by ETSI and PDC is format 2. Each packet 8/30 format 2 also has a label number and there can be up to four labels transmitted at a time. Each label contains the scheduled start time and date for a programme and flags to indicate the state. Each programme is assigned a label and in general a label will follow this sequence.

- PRF Set – Prepare for Record. This will tell a VCR to wake up and get ready. This happens about 40 seconds before the programme is active.
- PRF Clear – The VCR should be recording.
- RTI – Record Terminate/Interrupt – Tells the VCR to stop recording. This label is held for 30 seconds after the programme ends.

There are complicated rules for the case where a programme is interrupted by another one as in the case of a film with a break for news in the middle.

There is also a TIMER flag that indicates that there is no valid PDC and that the VCR should use its own timer.
