= Mediavideo =

Italian teletext service

Mediavideo was the teletext service broadcast on the primary Mediaset television channels (Rete 4, Canale 5, Italia 1) in Italy.
