= Televideo (teletext) =

Italian teletext service

Previous logo (2010–2022)

Televideo is the teletext service broadcast on all RAI television channels in Italy, and also available in its entirety on the Internet.

Launched in 1984 with 300 pages, today it counts around 900 pages, with 21 separate regional editions for Rai Tre. During the years, the term Televideo become part of Italian language vocabulary, as synonym of Teletext, with Rai 1, Rai 2, Rai 3.
