= Teletext =

Television information retrieval service

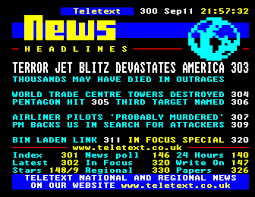
A British Teletext Ltd. index page from September 2001, showing news about the September 11 attacks

Teletext, or broadcast teletext, is a standard for displaying text and rudimentary graphics on suitably equipped television sets. Teletext sends data in the broadcast signal, hidden in the invisible vertical blanking interval (VBI) area at the top and bottom of the screen. The teletext decoder in the television buffers this information as a series of "pages", each given a number. The user can display chosen pages using their remote control. Teletext was uni-directional: the user could only receive, and not respond or send data of their own.

Teletext was created in the United Kingdom in the early 1970s by John Adams, Philips' lead designer for video display units to provide closed captioning to television shows for the hearing impaired. Public teletext information services were introduced by major broadcasters in the UK, starting with the BBC's Ceefax service in 1974. It offered a range of text-based information, typically including news, weather and TV schedules. Similar systems were subsequently introduced by other television broadcasters in various countries, with launches in West Germany (ARD and ZDF's Videotext) and the Netherlands (NOS's Teletekst) in 1980.

Teletext symbol standard (IEC 60417)

Teletext formed the basis for the World System Teletext standard (CCIR Teletext System B), an extended version of the original system. This standard saw widespread use across Europe starting in the 1980s, with almost all television sets including a decoder. Other standards were developed around the world, notably NABTS (CCIR Teletext System C) in the United States, Antiope (CCIR Teletext System A) in France and JTES (CCIR Teletext System D) in Japan, but these were never as popular as their European counterpart and most closed by the early 1990s.

Teletext inspired the later Videotex system that enabled bi-directional communication in a format later recognised as a prototype of the World Wide Web (WWW). Implementations included the French Minitel and the British Prestel. Introduced by the General Post Office, Prestel used Teletext's display standards but instead ran over bi-directional telephone lines using modems.

Most European teletext services continued to exist in one form or another until well into the 2000s when the expansion of the Internet precipitated a closure of some of them. However, many European television stations continue to provide teletext services and even make teletext content available via web and dedicated apps. The recent availability of digital television has led to more advanced systems being provided that perform the same task, such as MHEG-5 and Multimedia Home Platform.

== History ==
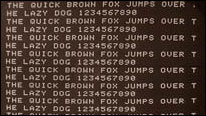
Early Ceefax test in 1972

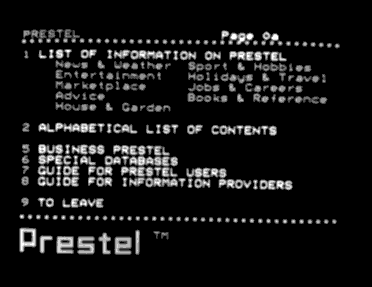
Prestel page from 1981

Teletext is a means of sending text and simple geometric shapes to a properly equipped television screen by use of one of the "vertical blanking interval" lines that together form the dark band dividing pictures horizontally on the television screen. Transmitting and displaying subtitles was relatively easy. It requires limited bandwidth; at a rate of perhaps a few words per second. However, it was found that by combining even a slow data rate with a suitable memory, whole pages of information could be sent and stored on the TV for later recall.

In the early 1970s, work was in progress in Britain to develop such a system. The goal was to provide UK rural homes with electronic hardware that could download pages of up-to-date news, reports, facts and figures targeting UK agriculture. The original idea was the brainchild of Philips (CAL) Laboratories in 1970.

In 1971, CAL engineer John Adams created a design and proposal for UK broadcasters. His configuration contained all the fundamental elements of classic teletext including pages of 24 rows with 40 characters each, page selection, sub-pages of information and vertical blanking interval data transmission. A major objective for Adams during the concept development stage was to make teletext affordable to the home user. In reality, there was no scope to make an economic teletext system with 1971 technology. However, as the low cost was essential to the project's long-term success, this obstacle had to be overcome.

Meanwhile, the General Post Office (GPO), whose telecommunications division later became British Telecom, had been researching a similar concept since the late 1960s, known as Viewdata. Unlike Teledata, a one-way service carried in the existing TV signal, Viewdata was a two-way system using telephones. Since the Post Office owned the telephones, this was considered to be an excellent way to drive more customers to use the phones.

In 1972, the BBC demonstrated its system, now known as Ceefax ("seeing facts", the departmental stationery used the "Cx" logo), on various news shows; this was not actual broadcast teletext but was transmitted using a wired connection. The Independent Television Authority (ITA) announced its own service in 1973, known as ORACLE (Optional Reception of Announcements by Coded Line Electronics). Not to be outdone, the GPO immediately announced a 1200/75 baud videotext service under the name Prestel (this system was based on teletext protocols, but telephone-based).

The TV-broadcast based systems were originally incompatible; Ceefax displayed pages of 24 lines with 32 characters each, while ORACLE offered pages of 22 lines with 40 characters each. In other ways the standards overlapped; for instance, both used 7-bit ASCII characters and other basic details. In 1974, all the services agreed on a standard for displaying the information. The display would be a simple 24 × 40 grid of text, with some graphics characters for constructing simple graphics. The standard did not define the delivery system, so both Viewdata-like and Teledata-like services could at least share the TV-side hardware (which at that time was quite expensive).

=== Rollout in the United Kingdom ===
The world's first demonstration of live broadcast teletext was a 50-page experimental transmission of ORACLE from the Crystal Palace transmitter to an invited audience on 9 April 1973.

The BBC began occasional test transmissions of Ceefax using dummy pages in 1973-4, and by June 1974 it had requested government authorisation to begin formal testing. Approval was granted and the BBC news department put together an editorial team of nine, led by editor Colin McIntyre, to develop a news and information service which began on 23 September 1974. Initially limited to 30 pages, Ceefax expanded to 50 pages in early 1975 and was expected to grow to a "full magazine" of 100 pages later that year.

Despite having been demonstrated first, ORACLE did not begin an experimental service until 30 June 1975.

There was no industrial commitment to make consumer decoders until May 1975, when the UK arm of Texas Instruments was announced as the first company to build decoders that would be sold to TV manufacturers for incorporation into their own sets by early 1976.

Before that point, the only existing teletext decoders were custom-built standalone experimental units, although there was enough technical information about the spec publicly available that the BBC acknowledged in late June 1974 that "a few gifted amateurs" had built their own.

Wireless World magazine ran a series of articles between November 1975 and June 1976 describing the design and construction of a teletext decoder using mainly TTL devices; however, development was limited until the first TV sets with built-in decoders started appearing in 1976.

By May 1976, volume production of teletext TVs had not yet started and while a handful of sets with teletext decoders were on sale, they cost about £1000 each (£11,350 in 2026). To try and reduce the cost of entry for consumers, the manufacturer Labgear produced a prototype standalone decoder box that could be used with any existing 625-line TV set, with an expected price point of £200 (£2260 in 2026), but this was still too expensive to prompt widespread adoption.

By August 1977, it was estimated that up to 3000 teletext TVs had been sold, and both Ceefax and ORACLE were still officially considered "experimental" services. Neither service ever received a formal public launch to separate their experimental phase from full operation; the word "experimental" was simply dropped from references to them in the late 70s.

From October 1977 to April 1978, an industrial dispute meant that ORACLE was blacked out nationally. From 1975 until 1977, ORACLE had operated for 12.5 hours a day Monday to Friday. A planned extension of its operating hours to cover the weekend prompted engineering staff at LWT, the national origination point for ORACLE, to request more money for the additional duties; this was refused, which led to the affected staff refusing to maintain the equipment during the week. A test page was broadcast instead.

By December 1979, it was estimated that there were about 14,000 teletext TVs in use, and that was the first year that the Queen's Christmas speech was publicly announced as being subtitled on Ceefax.

The "Broadcast Teletext Specification" was published in September 1976 jointly by the IBA, the BBC and the British Radio Equipment Manufacturers' Association. The new standard also made the term "teletext" generic, describing any such system. The standard was internationalised as World System Teletext (WST) by CCIR.

Other systems entered commercial service, like Prestel in 1979.

Teletext became popular in the United Kingdom when Ceefax, Oracle and the British government promoted teletext through a massive campaign in 1981.

By 1982, there were two million such sets, and by the mid-1980s they were available as an option for almost every European TV set, typically by means of a plug-in circuit board. It took another decade before the decoders became a standard feature on almost all sets with a screen size above 15 inches (Teletext is still usually only an option for smaller "portable" sets). From the mid-1980s, both Ceefax and ORACLE were broadcasting several hundred pages on every channel, slowly changing them throughout the day.

In 1986, WST was formalised as an international standard as CCIR Teletext System B. It was also adopted in many other European countries.

=== Development in other countries ===
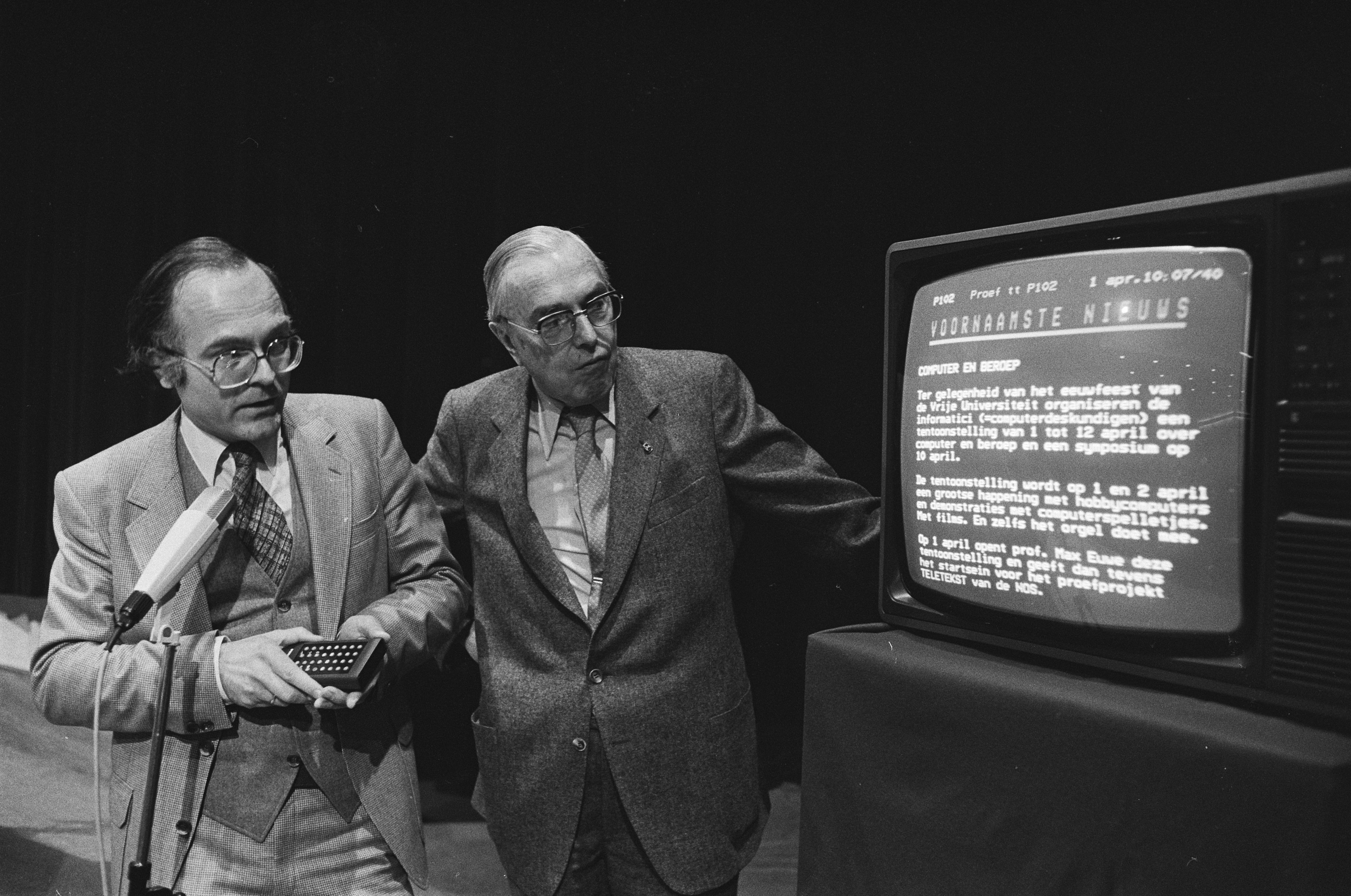
Teletext launch in Amsterdam, 1980

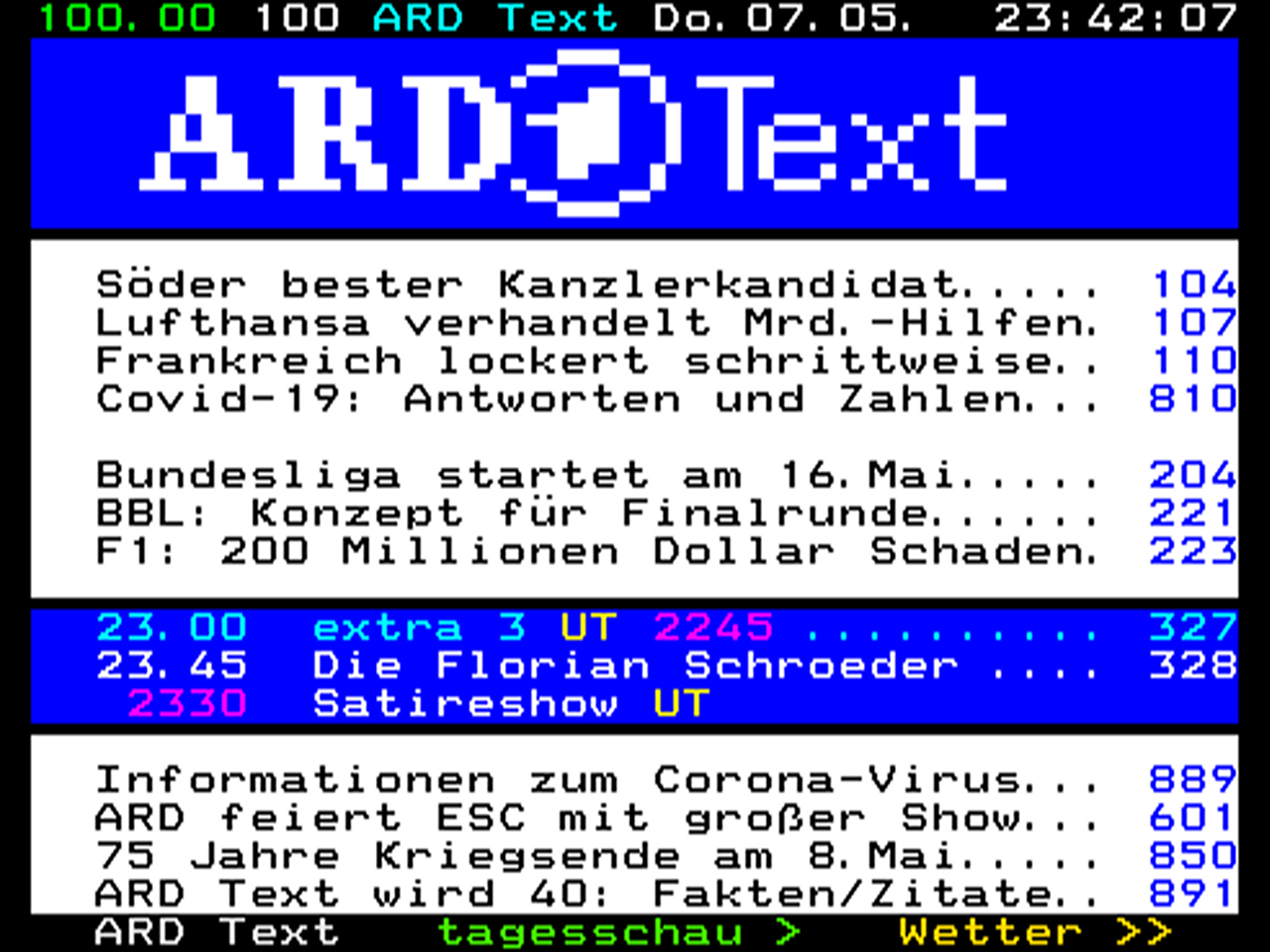
May 2020 teletext page 100 of German public broadcaster ARD

A number of similar teletext services were developed in other countries, some of which attempted to address the limitations of the initial British-developed system, by adding extended character sets or improving graphic abilities. For example, state-owned RAI launched its teletext service, called Televideo, in 1984, with support for Latin character set. Mediaset, the main commercial broadcaster, launched its Mediavideo Teletext in 1993. La7Video in 2001, heir to TMCvideo, the teletext of TMC Telemontecarlo born in the mids 90s. Always in the 90s, Rete A and Rete Mia teletexts arrived. Retemia's teletext has not been functional since 2000, Rete A's since 2006, La7Video since 2014 and Mediavideo since 2022. These developments are covered by the different World System Teletext Levels.

In France, where the SECAM standard is used in television broadcasting, a teletext system was developed in the late 1970s under the name Antiope. It had a higher data rate and was capable of dynamic page sizes, allowing more sophisticated graphics. It was phased out in favour of World System Teletext in 1991.

In North America, NABTS, the North American Broadcast Teletext Specification, was developed to encoding NAPLPS teletext pages, as well as other types of digital data. NABTS was the standard used for both CBS's ExtraVision and NBC's NBC Teletext services in the mid-1980s.

Japan developed its own JTES teletext system with support for Chinese, Katakana and Hiragana characters. Broadcasts started in 1983 by NHK.

In 1986, the four existing teletext systems were adopted into the international standard CCIR 653 (now ITU-R BT.653) as CCIR Teletext System A (Antiope), B (World System Teletext), C (NABTS) and D (JTES).

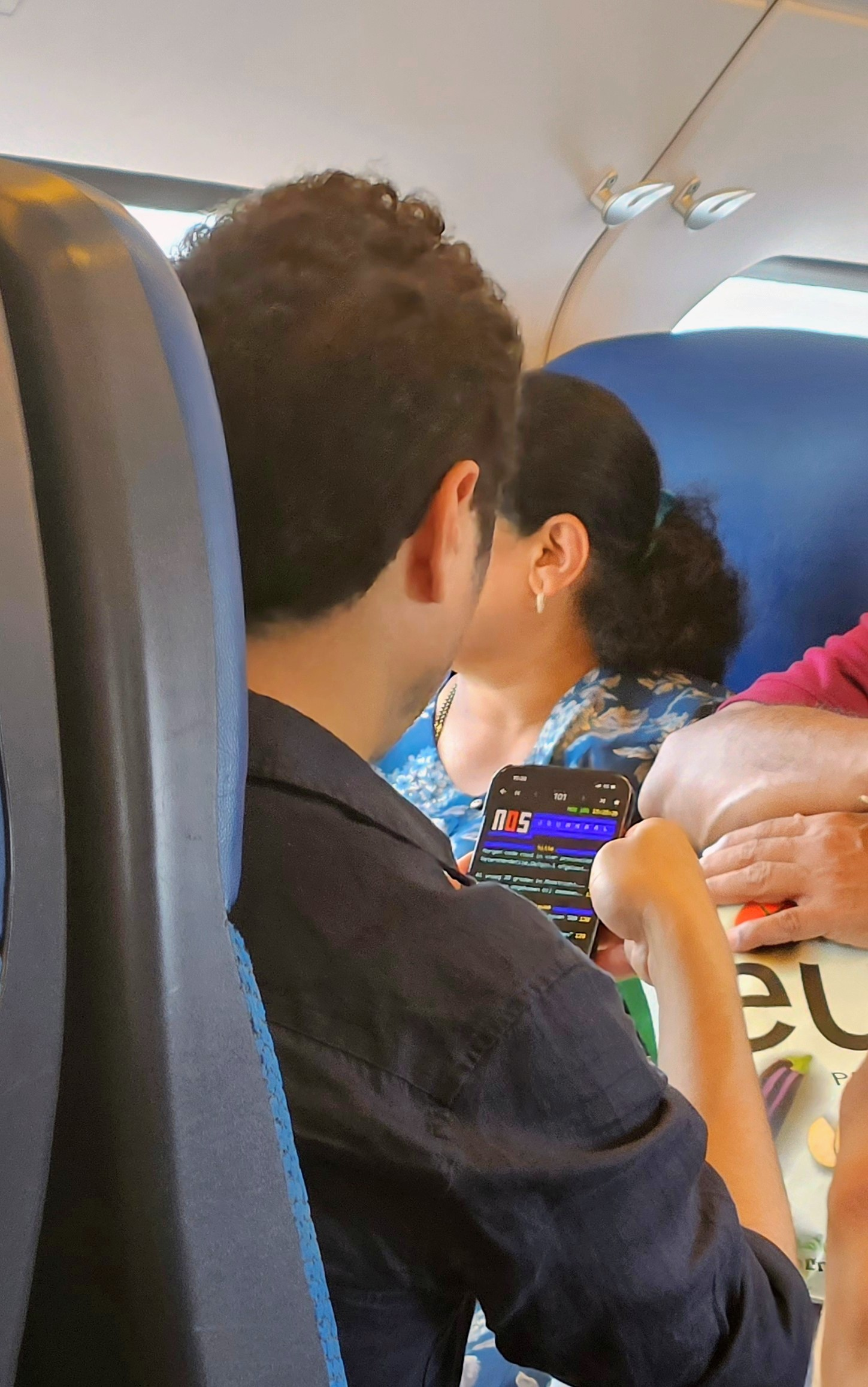
A smartphone user consulting NOS Teletekst in 2026

In 2023, the Dutch public broadcasting organization NOS replaced the original underlying system for teletext that had been in use since the 1980s with a new system. The reason behind the replacement was that the original Cyclone system became harder to maintain over the years and the NOS sometimes even had to consult retired British teletext experts to deal with issues. At the time, a recent Windows update had made it incompatible with the old Cyclone system. Since NOS Teletekst is still popular in the Netherlands (with 3.5 million people using it weekly on televisions and 1 million people using it weekly as an app on other devices), NOS decided to build a new modern underlying system to replace Cyclone. To make Teletekst look visually the same as on the old Cyclone system, the developers of the new system made use of reverse engineering.

Teletext systems used in various countries/geographical areas in 1998
Country/geographical area	Teletext standard	Remarks
Australia	B	
Belgium	A, B	
Brazil	C (modified), D	
Canada	C	
China	B	Extended character set with Chinese characters
Colombia	A	
Denmark	B	
Finland	B	
France	A	
Germany	B	
India	A	
Ireland	B	RTÉ Aertel launched in 1987 on RTE 1 and 2. Other services on launched later on TV3 and TG4
Italy	B	
Japan	D	
Malaysia	B	
Netherlands	B	
New Zealand	B	
Norway	B	
Poland	B	Experimental
Singapore	B	
South Africa	B	Character set with variations to also accommodate Afrikaans
Spain	B	Character set with variations to accommodate Basque, Catalan and Galician
Sweden	B	
Turkey	B	Character set with variations to accommodate Turkish
Ukraine	B	
United Kingdom	B	
United States	C	
Yugoslavia	B	Extended character set

=== Decline ===
The World Wide Web began to take over some of the functions of teletext from the late 1990s. However, due to its broadcast nature, Teletext remained a reliable source of information during times of crisis, for example during the September 11 attacks when webpages of major news sites became inaccessible because of the high demand.

As the web matured, many broadcasters ceased broadcast of Teletext — CNN in 2006 and the BBC in 2012. In the UK, the decline of Teletext was hastened by the introduction of digital television, though an aspect of teletext continues in closed captioning. In other countries the system is still widely used on standard-definition DVB broadcasts.

A number of broadcast authorities have ceased the transmission of teletext services.

- International broadcasters: A live teletext is no longer available on CNN International. Although many pages are still available, they have not been updated since 31 October 2006.
- United Kingdom: the founder of the world's first teletext service, the BBC, closed its Ceefax service in 2012 when Britain adopted a fully digital television broadcast system. The BBC maintains a Red Button service on digital TV which includes access to the latest text news; that text news service is accessible on the BBC News Channel and during BBC One newscasts. Plans to shut it down in 2020 were changed and a reduced service is planned into 2021. Many channels on Sky still broadcast teletext subtitles and may still have a small number of active pages. Analogue teletext ended in each region after analog broadcasts finished: see Digital switchover dates in the United Kingdom.
- Australia: the Seven Network shut down the Austext service on 30 September 2009. They said that the technology has come to the end of its useful service life and is not commercially viable to replace.
- New Zealand: TVNZ Access Services announced the discontinuation of the service on April 2, 2013. A claim about equipment failures and that web sites have been used instead has been given as the reason.
- Ireland: In November 2019, it was announced that RTÉ's Aertel would be shut down as part of cost-cutting measures. On 2 October 2023, it was announced by RTÉ that the service would be shut down on 12 October 2023.
- Italy: Some nation-wide teletext services were switched off; for example, MTV Video was active between 2000 and 2010, while "LA7 Video", the teletext service of La7, was launched in 2001 but discontinued in 2014.
- Malaysia: RTM's TV1 and TV2 ceased transmission of teletext on 1 January 2000. Media Prima reduced the amount of content offered on the Infonet teletext service on TV3 at the same time, and finally shutting down the service for good on 1 January 2008.
- Singapore: MediaCorp discontinued its teletext service on 30 September 2013.
- Germany: ProSiebenSat.1 began sunsetting its teletext services in 2025 by replacing all news content with a link to Joyn News and sports content with a link to the Ran website. Its services will shut down in early 2027 due to declining interest.

Subtitling still continues to use teletext in Australia, New Zealand, and Singapore with some providers switching to using image-based DVB subtitling for HD broadcasts. New Zealand solely uses DVB subtitling on terrestrial transmissions despite teletext still being used on internal SDI links.

== Technology ==
Exurb cut-out of VBI space of Teletext data from a 4fsc sampled vhs tape.

Teletext information is broadcast in the vertical blanking interval between image frames in a broadcast television signal, in numbered "pages". For example, a list of news headlines might appear on page 110; a teletext user would type "110" into the TV's remote control to view this page. The broadcaster constantly sends out pages in a sequence. There will typically be a delay of a few seconds from requesting the page and it being broadcast and displayed, the time being entirely dependent on the number of pages being broadcast. More sophisticated receivers use a memory buffer to store some or all of the teletext pages as they are broadcast, allowing almost instant display from the buffer. This basic architecture separates teletext from other digital information systems, such as the Internet, whereby pages are 'requested' and then 'sent' to the user – a method not possible given the one-way nature of broadcast teletext. Unlike the Internet, teletext is broadcast, so it does not slow down further as the number of users increases, although the greater number of pages, the longer one is likely to wait for each to be found in the cycle. For this reason, some pages (e.g. common index pages) are broadcast more than once in each cycle.

Teletext is also used for carrying special packets interpreted by TVs and video recorders, containing information about subjects such as channels and programming.

Teletext allows up to eight 'magazines' to be broadcast, identified by the first digit of the three-digit page number (1–8). Within each magazine there may theoretically be up to 256 pages at a given time, numbered in hexadecimal and prefixed with the magazine number – for example, magazine 2 may contain pages numbered 200-2FF. In practice, however, non-decimal page numbers are rarely used as domestic teletext receivers will not have options to select hex values A-F, with such numbered pages only occasionally used for 'special' pages of interest to the broadcaster and not intended for public view.

The broadcaster constantly sends out pages in sequence in one of two modes: Serial mode broadcasts every page sequentially whilst parallel mode divides VBI lines amongst the magazines, enabling one page from each magazine to be broadcast simultaneously. There will typically be a delay of a few seconds from requesting the page and it being broadcast and displayed; the time is entirely dependent on the number of pages being broadcast in the magazine (parallel mode) or in total (serial mode) and the number of VBI lines allocated. In parallel mode, therefore, some magazines will load faster than others.

=== Data transmission ===
A standard PAL signal contains 625 lines of video data per screen, broken into two "fields" containing half the lines of the whole image, divided as every odd line, then every even line number. Lines near the top of the screen are used to synchronize the display to the signal and are not seen on-screen. Data formatted in accordance with CEPT presentation layer protocol and data syntax standard is stored in these lines, where they are not visible, using lines 6–22 on the first field and 318–335 on the second field. The system does not have to use all of these lines; a unique pattern of bits allows the decoder to identify which lines contain data. Unused lines must not be used for other services as it will prevent teletext transmission. Some teletext services use a great number of lines, others, for reasons of bandwidth and technical issues, use fewer.

Teletext in the PAL B system can use the VBI lines 6–22 in first half image and 318–334 in the other to transmit 360 data bits including clock run-in and framing code during the active video period at a rate of 6.9375 Mbit/s ±25 bit/s using binary NRZ line coding. The amplitude for a "0" is black level ±2% and a "1" is 66±6% of the difference between black and peak white level. The clock run in consist of 8 times of "10" and the framing code is "11100100". The two last bits of the clock-run in shall start within 12+0.4
−1.0 μs from the negative flank of the line synchronization pulse.

The 6.9375 Mbit/s rate is 444 × nominal fH, i.e. the TV line frequency. Thus 625 × 25 × 444 = 6,937,500 Hz. Each bit will then be 144 ns long. The bandwidth amplitude is 50% at 3.5 MHz and 0% at 6 MHz. If the horizontal sync pulse during the vertical synchronization starts in the middle of the horizontal scan line. Then first interlace frame will be sent, otherwise, if vertical synchronization let the full video line complete the second interlace frame is sent.

Like EIA-608, bits are transmitted in the order of LSB to MSB with odd parity coding of 7-bit character codes. However unlike EIA-608, the DVB version is transmitted the same way. For single bit error recovery during transmission, the packet address (page row and magazine numbers) and header bytes (page number, subtitle flag, etc.) use hamming code 8/4 with extended packets (header extensions) using hamming 24/18, which basically doubles the bits used.

The commonly used standard B uses a fixed PAL subtitling bandwidth of 8,600 (7,680 without page/packet header) bits/s per field for a maximum of 32 characters per line per caption (maximum three captions – lines 19 – 21) for a 25 frame broadcast. While the bandwidth is greater than EIA-608, so is the error rate with more bits encoded per field. Subtitling packets use a lot of non-boxed spacing to control the horizontal positioning of a caption and to pad out the fixed packet. The vertical caption position is determined by the packet address.

Teletext binary NRZ encodings
Standard	Color system	Informational CVBS Lines	Bit rate [Mbit/s]	Waveform	Bits per line (including run-in)	Max. characters (per page row)
A (Antiope)	SECAM	7–18	6.203	Squared Sine wave	320	97
B (World System Teletext)	NTSC	10–18	5.727	Symmetrical about 1/2 bit rate	296	32
B (World System Teletext)	PAL	7–18	6.938	Symmetrical about 1/2 bit rate	360	40
C (NABTS)	NTSC	10–18	5.727	Raised cosine 100% roll-off	288	31
C (NABTS)	PAL-M	10–18	5.734	Raised cosine 100% roll-off	288	31
D (JTES)	NTSC	10–18	5.727	Controlled cosine roll-off of 0.6	296	32
D (JTES)	PAL-M	10–18	5.642	100% cosine roll-off	296	32

In the case of the Ceefax and ORACLE systems and their successors in the UK, the teletext signal is transmitted as part of the ordinary analog TV signal but concealed from view in the Vertical Blanking Interval (VBI) television lines which do not carry picture information. The teletext signal is digitally coded as 45-byte packets, so the resulting rate is 7,175 bits per second per line (41 7-bit 'bytes' per line, on each of 25 frames per second).

A teletext page comprises one or more frames, each containing a screen-full of text. The pages are sent out one after the other in a continual loop. When the user requests a particular page the decoder simply waits for it to be sent, and then captures it for display. In order to keep the delays reasonably short, services typically only transmit a few hundred frames in total. Even with this limited number, waits can be up to 30 seconds, although teletext broadcasters can control the speed and priority with which various pages are broadcast.

Modern television sets, however, usually have built-in memory, often for a few thousand different pages. This way, the teletext decoder captures every page sent out and stores it in memory, so when a page is requested by the user it can be loaded directly from memory instead of having to wait for the page to be transmitted. When the page is transmitted again, the decoder updates the page in memory.

The text can be displayed instead of the television image, or superimposed on it (a mode commonly called mix). Some pages, such as subtitles (closed captioning), are in-vision, meaning that text is displayed in a block on the screen covering part of the television image.

The original standard provides a monospaced 40×24 character grid. Characters are sent using a 7-bit codec, with an 8th bit employed for error detection. The standard was improved in 1976 (World System Teletext Level 1) to allow for improved appearance and the ability to individually select the color of each character from a palette of eight. The proposed higher resolution Level 2 (1981) was not adopted in Britain (in-vision services from Ceefax & ORACLE did use it at various times, however, though even this was ceased by the BBC in 1996), although transmission rates were doubled from two to four lines a frame.

=== Levels ===
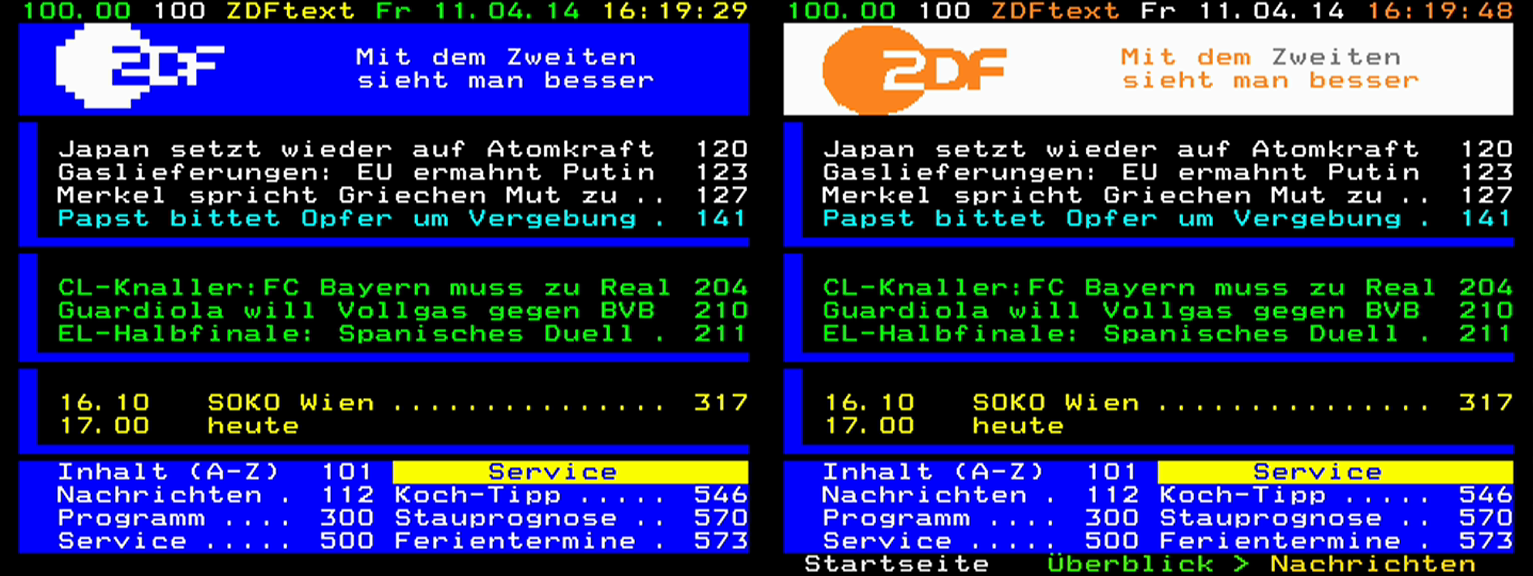
Comparison between teletext Level 1.0 and teletext Level 2.5

In the early 1980s, a number of higher extension levels were envisaged for the specification, based on ideas then being promoted for worldwide videotex standards (telephone dial-up services offering a similar mix of text and graphics).

The most common implementation is Level 1.5, which supports languages other than English. Virtually any TV sold in Europe since the 1990s has support for this level. After 1994 some stations adopted Level 2.5 Teletext or Hi-Text, which allows for a larger color palette and higher resolution graphics.

The proposed higher content levels included geometrically specified graphics (Level 4), and higher-resolution photographic-type images (Level 5), to be conveyed using the same underlying mechanism at the transport layer. No TV sets currently implement the two most sophisticated levels.

== Decoders ==
The Mullard SAA5050 was a character generator chip used in the UK teletext-equipped television sets. In addition to the UK version, several variants of the chip existed with slightly different character sets for particular localizations and/or languages. These had part numbers SAA5051 (German), SAA5052 (Swedish), SAA5053 (Italian), SAA5054 (Belgian), SAA5055 (U.S. ASCII), SAA5056 (Hebrew) and SAA5057 (Cyrillic). The type of decoder circuitry is sometimes marked on televisions as CCT (Computer-Controlled Teletext), or ECCT (Enhanced Computer-Controlled Teletext).

Besides the hardware implementations, it is also possible to decode teletext using a PC and video capture or DVB board, as well as recover historical teletext from self-recorded VHS tapes.

The Acorn BBC Micro's default graphics mode (mode 7) was based on teletext display, and the computer could be used to create and serve teletext-style pages over a modem connection. With a suitable adapter, the computer could receive and display teletext pages, as well as software over the BBC's Ceefax service, for a time. The Philips P2000 home computer's video logic was also based on a chip designed to provide teletext services on television sets.

== Uses ==
=== Interactive teletext ===
Some TV channels offer a service called interactive teletext to remedy some of the shortcomings of standard teletext. To use interactive teletext, the user calls a special telephone number with a push-button telephone. A computer then instructs them to go to a teletext page which is assigned to them for that session.

Usually, the page initially contains a menu of options, from which the user chooses using the telephone keypad. When a choice has been made, the selected page is immediately broadcast for viewing. This is in contrast with usual teletext where the user has to wait for the selected page to be broadcast.

This technology enables teletext to be used for games, chat, access to databases, etc. It overcomes the limitations on the number of available pages. On the other hand, only a limited number of users can be serviced at the same time, since one page number is allocated per user. Some channels solve this by taking into account where the user is calling from and by broadcasting different teletext pages in different geographical regions. In that way, two different users can be assigned the same page number at the same time as long as they do not receive the TV signals from the same source. Another drawback to the technology is the privacy concerns in that many users can see what a user is doing because the interactive pages are received by all viewers. Also, the user usually has to pay for the telephone call to the TV station.

=== Bulletin boards ===
Spanish prisons have banned or deactivated TV sets with teletext capabilities, after finding that the inmates received coded messages from accomplices outside through the bulletin board sections. The same phenomenon has been observed in Finland, where inmates received messages from smugglers through the family bulletin board.

=== Teletext art ===
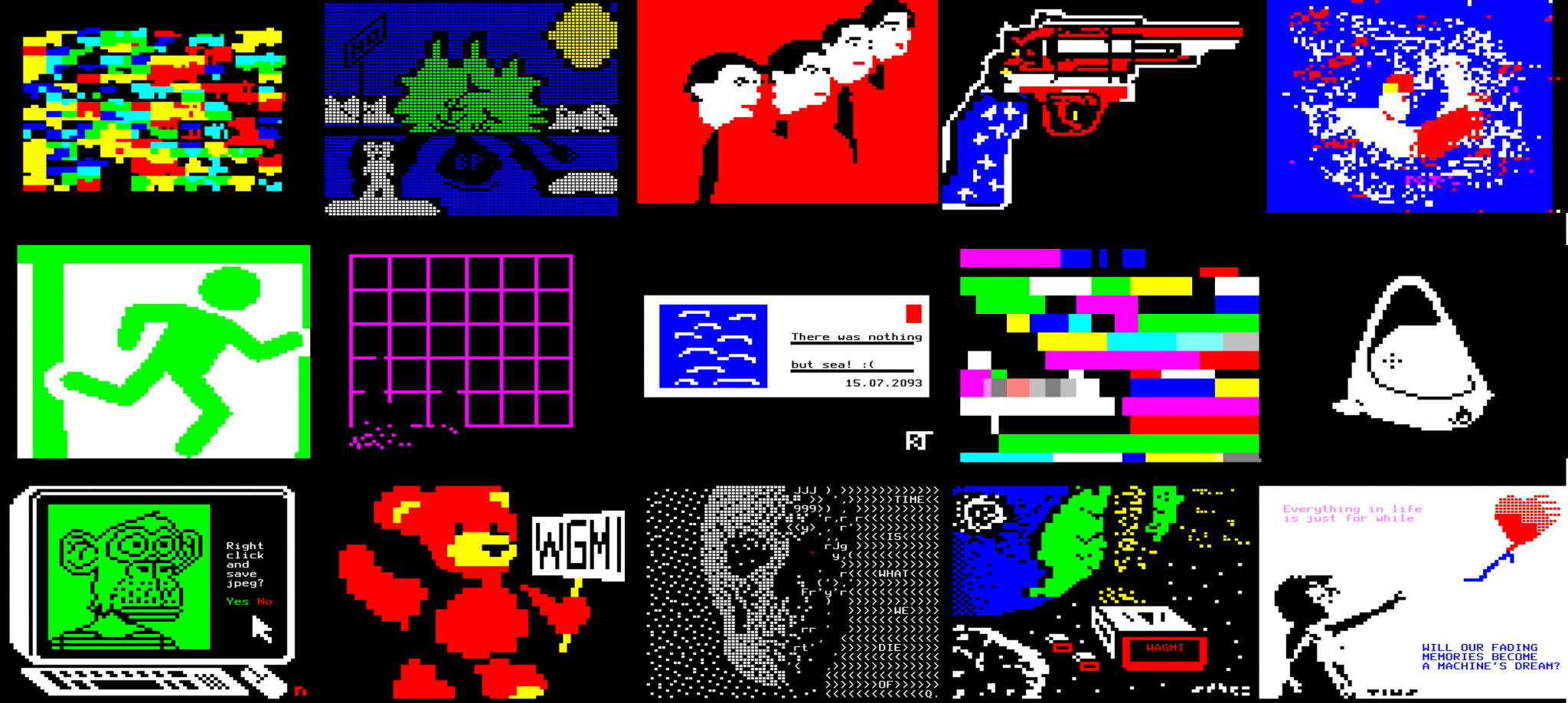
Teletext artworks by TeleNFT (2022) in the typical aesthetics.

The ability to display colored characters and pixels is also used to create teletext art. A teletext page in World System Teletext Level 1 format offers 7-bit colors and a canvas with 40x24 characters, each containing a text character or one of a selection of 2x3 pixel graphics characters known as "sixels" (not to be confused with the 1x6 sixels used on DEC terminals). Specific control commands can be used to switch between text and graphic pixels, and to add effects such as rasterization, blinking, or double line height. The rasterized working area and the limited display options result in the typical teletext aesthetics.

In cooperation with Finnish state television YLE, the Museum of Teletext Art has been presenting and archiving international teletext art online, on air and in exhibitions since 2014.

== Legacy and successors ==
While the basic teletext format has remained unchanged in more than 30 years, a number of improvements and additions have been made.

- Standard electronic program guide (EPGs), like NexTView, are based on teletext, using a compact binary format instead of preformatted text pages.
- Various other kinds of information are sent over the teletext protocol. For instance, Programme Delivery Control (PDC) signals—used by video recorders for starting/stopping recording at the correct time even during changes in programming—are sent as Teletext packets. A similar, but different, standard Video Programming System is also used for this purpose.
- Teletext pages may contain special packages allowing VCRs to interpret their contents. This is used in relation to the Video Programming by Teletext (also known as startext) system which allows users to program their videos for recording by simply selecting the program on a teletext page with a listing of programs.
- Other standards define how special teletext packets may contain information about the name of the channel and the program currently being shown.

=== Internet services ===
Prestel was a British information-retrieval system based on teletext protocols. However, it was essentially a different system, using a modem and the phone system to transmit and receive the data, comparable to systems such as France's Minitel. The modem was asymmetric, with data sent at 75-bit/s, and received at 1200-bit/s. This two-way nature allowed pages to be served on request, in contrast to the TV-based systems' sequential rolling method. It also meant that a limited number of extra services were available such as booking events or train tickets and a limited amount of online banking.

A number of teletext services have been syndicated to web viewers, which mimic the look and feel of broadcast teletext. RSS feeds of news and information from the BBC are presented in Ceefax format in the web viewer.

In 2016, the Teefax teletext service was launched in the United Kingdom to coverage by the BBC, ITV and others. Using a Raspberry Pi computer card as a set-top box, it feeds its service to standard televisions. Teefax content is a mix of crowdsourcing, syndication and contributions from media professionals who contributed heavily to broadcast teletext services. Teefax is also syndicated to a web viewer.

=== Digital teletext ===
NRK digital teletext

With the advent of digital television, some countries adopted the name "digital teletext" for newer standards, despite the older teletext standards' digital nature. Digital teletext is encoded with standards including MHEG-5 and Multimedia Home Platform (MHP).

Other countries use the same teletext streams as before on DVB transmissions, due to the DVB-TXT and DVB-VBI sub-standards. Those allow the emulation of analogue teletext on digital TV platforms, directly on the TV or set-top box, or by recreating analog output, reproducing the vertical blanking interval data in which teletext is carried.

== Similar systems ==
A closely related service is the Video Program System (VPS), introduced in Germany in 1985. Like teletext, this signal is also broadcast in the vertical blanking interval. It consists only of 32 bits of data, primarily the date and time for which the broadcast of the currently running TV programme was originally scheduled. Video recorders can use this information (instead of a simple timer) in order to automatically record a scheduled programme, even if the broadcast time changes after the user programmes the VCR. VPS also provides a PAUSE code; broadcasters can use it to mark interruptions and pause the recorders, however, advertisement-financed broadcasters tend not to use it during their ad breaks. VPS (line 16) definition is now included in the Programme Delivery Control (PDC) standard from ETSI.

== See also ==
- Antiope – French teletext standard (CCIR Teletext System A)
- NABTS – North American Broadcast Teletext Specification (CCIR Teletext System C)
- JTES – Japanese Teletext Specification (CCIR Teletext System D)
- NAPLPS – North American Presentation Level Protocol Syntax
- Park Avenue (teletext soap)
- Radio Data System
- Teletext character set
- Text semigraphics
- Digitiser
- InfoChammel
- Interactive television
