= Steve Regan =

British journalist and television critic

Steve Regan (born 1958 in Wigan) is a UK-based journalist and television critic who worked for the ORACLE teletext service during the 1980s and early 1990s. Educated at the University of Kent, for many years he wrote a popular column on the service under the pseudonym Sam Brady in which he regularly poured scorn on the "middle class blandies" he believed were running the British television industry.

The column was very popular with viewers and when ORACLE closed on 31 December 1992, the column was taken up by its replacement Teletext on 3. It continued for nine years until it was dropped following a change in direction by Teletext.

From the mid-1990s Regan wrote columns for the Hull Daily Mail (where he became known as the King of Hull), the Whitstable Times, the Kentish Times and the Moorlands Trader (Staffordshire). He is now working as a communications director. He writes a blog under his real name, and he also writes as Sam Brady, but again now as a blogger.
