= John Earls =

English music journalist

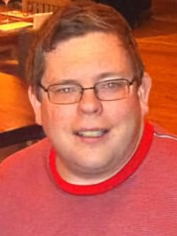
- Earls in 2019
- Born: 25 August 1972 (age 53); Milton Keynes, England
- Occupations: Music critic; sports journalist
- Years active: 1991–present

John Earls (born 25 August 1972) is an English music and sports journalist who serves as reviews editor for Classic Pop. Earls has been a regular contributor to other music magazines such as the NME, Record Collector, and Planet Sound, which he edited from 2001 until its closure in 2009. He is a sporadic football critic for When Saturday Comes.

Earls' work has also appeared in outlets including Newsweek, The Guardian, Drowned in Sound and the Daily Star. For his music criticism, Earls has won publishing industry awards from the British Society of Magazine Editors (BSME) and the Professional Publishers Association (PPA).

== Childhood and early career ==
Born on 25 August 1972, Earls grew up in Milton Keynes. His writings were published by Doctor Who Magazine, and ORACLE's Blue Suede Views music magazine, during his teens. Earls started writing professionally following a 1991 work experience placement at football magazine When Saturday Comes, continuing to cover the sport on an infrequent basis as he moved into the realm of entertainment journalism. During the 1990s Earls worked as a showbiz reporter for The Sunday People; he left the newspaper in 1999, becoming a teen entertainment writer for Teletext (the successor to ORACLE).

== Planet Sound and beyond ==
Earls became a critic for Teletext's music magazine, Planet Sound, some 18 months after joining the company. He was named editor in 2001 and held this post until Teletext ceased broadcasting in December 2009. Earls became synonymous with Planet Sound and his work was often cited by other outlets. He gave early exposure to chart bands such as The Twilight Sad, Maxïmo Park and Hope of the States, by featuring their demo tapes in the magazine's review section. The Twilight Sad frontman James Graham expressed his affection for Earls: "I used to read Planet Sound every day... He's a nice guy and I really appreciate the support he gave us."

Earls has interviewed many musicians throughout his career, and has regularly written for magazines such as Classic Pop, the NME and Record Collector. In 2025, he became reviews editor for Classic Pop. Earls' music and football commentary has also appeared in outlets including Newsweek, The Guardian, Drowned in Sound and the Daily Star. He wrote the sleeve notes for the 40th anniversary edition of A Flock of Seagulls' 1982 self-titled debut album, as well as for the Fun Boy Three box set, The Complete Fun Boy Three (2023). Record Collector identifies the 1980s as his specialist era.

Spiked noted the "critical wisdom of John Earls", while remarking upon his "evident knowledge and enthusiasm" for music journalism. He was recognised by Music Week as a "specialist media tastemaker", and was listed by BBC News as an "influential and impartial UK-based music critic". In 2022, Earls won "Best Writer – Specialist" at the BSME Talent Awards, receiving praise for his communication and interview skills. Three years later, he was named "Writer of the Year" at the Professional Publishers Association (PPA) Independent Publisher Awards. According to the PPA, Earls was "awarded for his meticulous, engaging features and rare-access interviews, with judges noting clear audience resonance and sales uplift." Aside from his writing career, Earls lectures in journalism, and co-founded a record label, WET, in 2009.

In 2009 Earls listed the following albums as ones that music fans should own, besides "the obvious great ones they'd already own":

- Pet Shop Boys – Very
- My Life Story – Mornington Crescent
- The Delgados – The Great Eastern
- The Teardrop Explodes – Wilder
- The National – Alligator
