= Timeline of teletext in the UK =

This is a timeline of the history of teletext on television in the UK. .

== 1970s ==
- 1972
  - October – Ceefax is announced by the BBC as a new service providing pages of text on ordinary television screens.
- 1973
  - April – The first transmission of Oracle takes place, during Engineering Announcements.
- 1974
  - 23 September – The BBC's teletext service Ceefax goes live with 30 pages of information.
- 1975
  - 15 July – BBC1 airs This is Ceefax in which Angela Rippon tells the story of this new form of broadcasting and looks at some of its uses.
- 1976
  - World System Teletext is adopted as the common way to broadcast teletext services through Europe with a display format of 24 rows by 40 columns of characters.
- 1977
  - February – ITV Oracle broadcasts the first ever telesoftware broadcast on pages 101, 102 and 103. There is no reception equipment available to view the broadcast, but it gives the concept of a teletext service carrying software on some of its pages great practical credibility. This broadcast is observed on a public demonstration teletext television at the BBC Pebble Mill studio in Birmingham by the kind help of a member of BBC staff. The software is for a Signetics 2650 microprocessor.
- 1978
  - ITV's teletext service ORACLE launches.
- 1979
  - 14 May – BBC Ceefax begins broadcasts a telesoftware broadcast on Ceefax page 192. The software is written in a specially designed machine independent object code (1456 object code, in speech "fourteen fifty-six object code") with the idea that the object code could be used in a virtual machine so that a telesoftware decoder could use a microprocessor of the choice of the manufacturer of the decoder thus providing fairness of opportunity for manufacturers of microprocessors.

== 1980s ==
- 1980
  - 12 March – The very first in-vision Ceefax transmission is broadcast. It is shown on BBC1 between 8:30am and 9am. A short time later, two 30-minute broadcasts, usually aired at 10am and 3:30pm, begin on BBC2. The output showcases various aspects of the Ceefax service, with a digest of news, sport, weather, TV listings and other topics. The in-vision broadcasts are designed to help promote the Ceefax service and what it offers, along with teletext in general. The broadcasts, called Ceefax in Vision, are not referred to in the Radio Times or on newspapers’ television listings pages.
- 1981
  - October – National Teletext Month takes place. Sponsored by the Department of Trade and Industry and supported by various manufacturers, this is an initiative to promote greater awareness and take-up of teletext receivers by consumers.
- 1982
  - 1 November – S4C launches, along with its teletext service Sbectel.
  - 2 November – Channel 4 launches, along with its teletext service 4-Tel. Both Sbectel and 4-Tel are operated in conjunction with ORACLE with the production of 4-Tel outsourced to Intelfax, a company set up especially for the purpose.
- 1983
  - 28 February – BBC1 begins broadcasting a 30-minute Ceefax slot prior to the start of Breakfast Time. It is called Ceefax AM. It is first mentioned in the Radio Times on 21 March.
  - 18 March – Channel 4 broadcasts in-vision teletext pages for the first time. Two magazines are shown – 4-Tel on View and Oracle on View – and in fifteen minute bursts which are repeated several times each day prior to the start of each day's transmissions. Teletext pages are only shown on weekdays.
  - 2 May – From today Ceefax in Vision is broadcast during all daytime downtime although until September BBC2 continues to fully close down for the four hours after Play School if the programme gap is longer than two hours.
  - Ceefax starts to broadcast computer programs, known as telesoftware, for the BBC Micro (a home computer available in the United Kingdom). It broadcasts the pages in the 700s page range as an addition to the regular 100-page service.
  - November – The Ceefax service is relaunched.
- 1984
  - 7 January – Daytime Ceefax transmissions are renamed Pages from Ceefax following the decision by Radio Times to begin listing daytime Ceefax broadcasts.
- 1985
  - Sky Channel launches its teletext service Sky Text.
  - 1 October – ORACLE revamps its service. The pages on ITV become more news focused and more regional pages are added and the content on Channel 4 becomes more magazine focussed. The changes also see the end of duplicate pages on both channels.
- 1986
  - 2 April – The first in-vision teletext service is seen on ITV when Central launches its Jobfinder service which broadcasts for one hour after the end of the day's programming.
  - May – Ceefax expands its sports coverage when it moves the sport pages to the 300s. This allows Ceefax to expand other sections into the 20 pages previously used for sports news.
  - 24 October – Ahead of the launch of the BBC's daytime television service, Pages from Ceefax are shown during BBC1's daytime downtime for the final time.
- 1987
  - 25 April – Central becomes the first UK television station to use teletext pages to fully fill overnight downtime when, following a programme hours extension, Central fills that downtime with its Jobfinder service.
  - 7 December – The first night-long teletext broadcasts take place in the UK when Tyne Tees launches its Jobfinder service. It airs the service from its usual closedown time of just after midnight until TV-am starts at 6am.
- 1988
  - The commencement of 24-hour broadcasting on ITV sees many more regions launching a teletext Jobfinder service as part of their overnight offering with almost all of the ITV regions using Level 2 teletext graphics. The pages are generally aired between 4am and 5am.
  - 1 December – ORACLE launches its teletext soap opera Park Avenue. A new episode is released daily until ORACLE’s final day on air. To this day, it remains the only soap opera of its kind.
- 1989
  - 31 March – The last Oracle on View transmission takes place.
  - The Ceefax Telesoftware transmissions end after six years.
  - 20 November – The Ceefax service is relaunched to focus on news, sport and current affairs. The magazine elements are significantly reduced and are mainly restricted to the weekend.

== 1990s ==
- 1990
  - No events.
- 1991
  - No events.
- 1992
  - 30 April – The Independent Television Commission announces that Teletext Ltd will replace ORACLE as the teletext provider for ITV and Channel 4 at the end of the year.
  - 16 November – A reorganisation of the Ceefax service takes place.
  - 31 December – ORACLE’s final day on air, and it stops broadcasting at 23:59:59.
- 1993
  - 1 January – At the stroke of midnight, Teletext launches as ITV's new teletext service.
- 1994
  - February – Level 2 teletext graphics are introduced to Pages from Ceefax. However, in early 1996 the Ceefax Level 2 broadcasts are abandoned, not least as they are unreliable and often appear with lines missing and with other obvious technical issues.
- 1995
  - 16 October – BBC Learning Zone launches and Ceefax pages are broadcast in the gaps between the end of regular programmes and the start of Learning Zone broadcasts. This is the first time that Ceefax is broadcast overnight on a regular basis.
- 1996
  - 16 November – A major (and final) reorganisation of the Ceefax service takes place.
- 1997
  - 6 January – Channel 4 starts 24-hour broadcasting, resulting in the end of 4-Tel on View.
  - October – The full version Channel 5's teletext service 5 Text launches. Sky Text is contracted to operate the service.
  - 9 November
    - Pages from Ceefax is broadcast across the UK on BBC1 for the final time as from the following day, all overnight downtime is replaced by an overnight simulcast of BBC News 24.
    - The launch of BBC News 24 sees the BBC introduce a teletext service for the channel. However it is not known as Ceefax despite carrying many of the same pages.
  - November – The BBC introduces regional news and sports pages to Ceefax. This is the first time that any part of the Ceefax service has been regionalised.
- 1998
  - No events.
- 1999
  - No events.

== 2000s ==
- 2000
  - No events.
- 2001
  - No events.
- 2002
  - Channel 4 renames its teletext service to FourText.
  - Ceefax stops broadcasting on digital satellite.
  - Teletext Ltd. takes over as provider of Channel 5’s teletext service.
- 2003
  - No events.
- 2004
  - No events.
- 2005
  - No events.
- 2006
  - No events.
- 2007
  - 17 October – Eskdale Green, Gosforth and Whitehaven in west Cumbria are the first places in the UK to lose their teletext services when they become the first area to complete Digital Switchover.
- 2008
  - 20 November – Selkirk is the first major transmitter to stop broadcasting teletext services and over the next four years, teletext is switched off on a transmitter-by-transmitter basis as analogue transmissions end as the UK goes through digital switchover.
- 2009
  - 9 November – Sbectel stops broadcasting on the day that the first area in Wales (most of South West Wales) completes Digital Switchover.
  - 15 December – With the exception of its travel and holiday sections, ITVs teletext service stops broadcasting on analogue TV.

== 2010s ==
- 2010
  - 29 January – The broadcasting regulator Ofcom revokes Teletext's licence to broadcast and in May Ofcom imposes a financial penalty of £225,000 on Teletext Limited for ceasing to provide part of its service whilst its licence was still extant.
- 2011
  - Channel 5 closes its teletext service 5 Text.
- 2012
  - 22 October – At 5.59am the final transmission of Pages from Ceefax comes to an end with special continuity announcements and a specially created end caption featuring various Ceefax graphics from over the years.
  - 23 October – At 23:32:19 BST, in line with the digital switchover being completed in the final part of the UK, the Ceefax service ends after 38 years.
- 2013
  - 30 October – Sky switches off its Sky Text service.

== See also ==
- Timeline of in vision teletext broadcasts in the UK
