= Digitiser =

Teletext-based video game magazine

- Categories: Video games
- Frequency: Daily (primarily)
- Format: Teletext
- Founder: Paul Rose; Tim Moore
- Founded: 1 January 1993
- Final issue: 9 March 2003
- Company: Teletext Ltd.
- Language: English

Digitiser was a video games magazine broadcast on Teletext in the United Kingdom between 1993 and 2003. It was originally billed as "The World's Only Daily Game Magazine".

The magazine launched on 1 January 1993 on page 370 of the Teletext service on ITV before transferring to Channel 4 later that year. It was updated daily except on Sundays. In 2002, the schedule was reduced to three days a week (weekends and holidays) for a nine-month period.

At its peak, Digitiser had up to 1.5 million viewers. The magazine was known for its surreal humour, risqué jokes, and games coverage. It was advertised on the back of several issues of the multi-platform video game magazine Electric Brain.

Digitiser was created by writers Paul Rose and Tim Moore, who used the pseudonyms Mr Biffo and Mr Hairs. They wrote the magazine together for the first four years. Rose wrote the publication largely solo as a freelancer for the remaining six years.

== History ==
Digitiser generated controversy during its run, drawing criticism from external groups and Teletext's editorial team. The editorial staff viewed the writers as difficult but did not cancel the column due to its popularity. Sub-editors often altered pages without the writers' knowledge or deleted reviews to remove potentially offensive jokes.

On one occasion, a sub-editor contacted Rose to demand the removal of a reference to "fingering the index." Rose stated it was a play on the term "index finger," but the editor insisted it was provocative and deleted it. A similar disagreement occurred over a reference to "The three Rs," which editors interpreted as a reference to "arse" rather than the educational principle.

According to Rose, there were internal and external campaigns to have the writing team dismissed. Complaints came from fans of Amiga, Sega, Sony, and Nintendo, as well as staff from Mean Machines and Official Nintendo Magazine, publications that Digitiser often satirized. Rose stated that these reactions encouraged him to maintain a controversial tone, noting on the letters page that the magazine "hates everyone equally."

Despite the content and internal friction, Digitiser maintained a large readership. The reviews, format, and unusual tone contributed to its popularity.

In 2002, a new senior editorial team at Teletext attempted to change the magazine's tone. They ordered that publication be reduced to three days a week and requested the removal of the humour and characters. Rose claimed he was told the humour "excluded people." Another factor in the reduction was the financial impact of the September 11 attacks on Teletext Ltd.'s travel advertising business.

Rose continued to write the pages anonymously but reduced his working hours. Following the format changes, viewing figures dropped from 1.5 million to 400,000 per day. Viewers sent complaints to the company demanding the return of the original style. In response to the feedback, Teletext asked Rose to reinstate the humour and return to a daily schedule. Rose submitted his notice in December 2002 but agreed to write Digitiser in its original style for a final four-month run. This conclusion included a ten-year anniversary celebration featuring a tribute by author Alex Garland. Digitiser ceased publication on 9 March 2003.

It was replaced by GameCentral, which used the same number of sub-pages but adopted a more conventional tone. In the first edition, editor Tony Mott told readers, "We're not Digitiser so get over it."

== The writers ==
The founding writers were Mr Biffo (Paul Rose) and Mr Hairs (Tim Moore). According to Rose, they initially took the job to "amuse ourselves and get free games." Teletext fired Moore in May 1996. Rose continued to write the majority of the magazine alone, with occasional help from part-time contributors for the letters, tips, and charts pages.

These assistants used pseudonyms such as Mr Cheese, Mr Udders, and Mr Toast. Digitiser also ran a weekly opinion column written by guest journalists, including Violet Berlin and Stuart Campbell.

== Other appearances ==
In a 10 December 2006 episode, videoGaiden inducted Digitiser into their "videoGaiden Time Capsule." The segment featured Colin Baker in his Doctor Who costume and the song "Lavender" by Marillion.

== Regular characters ==
Fictional characters appeared on the service to fill space in reviews and letters sections.

The Man With a Long Chin (later The Man) – Kept a diary detailing his weekly employment, which usually ended with him being fired. In one entry, he worked at a burger bar but was dismissed for replacing toilet paper with gloves, leading to a customer freezing to death.

The Man's Daddy (later Daddy) – An ant/elephant hybrid who claimed to be a famous comedian. His jokes were often disjointed or relied on nonsense answers and puns.

Mr. T – A parody of Mr. T from The A-Team. He gave advice and warned children to stay away from his bins. His dialogue was distinguished by the capitalization of entire words.

Phoning Honey – A character who made prank calls to stores and published the transcripts.

Fat Sow – Presented the news page. Articles began with insults and demands for the reader's attention. Rose reportedly received a warning after editors judged a comment about security guards to be offensive.

Zombie Dave – A reanimated corpse who commented on news items in the style of a zombie. This device was sometimes used to bypass censorship filters.

Insincere Dave – A parody of enthusiastic reviewers and marketing staff, specifically referencing Dave Gibbons of the BBC Ceefax service. Dave provided overly optimistic comments on gaming news, often using excessive exclamation marks (e.g., "Now your DC can be in the pink!!!!!!!"). Occasionally, he appeared as a deadpan version who commented on the financial aspects of the industry.

The Snakes – Two beatboxing snakes who argued in a style similar to Ali G. They used the catchphrase "I Cuss You Bad."

BW – A quizmaster who parodied Bamber Boozler from the Teletext quiz Bamboozle.

Gossi the Dog – A cartoon dog who hosted the gossip page. The Broadcasting Standards Commission upheld a complaint regarding a column that implied Gossi's owner beat him with a belt. This page led to the dismissal of Tim Moore after he printed a rumour about journalist Dave Perry.

Doctor Derek Doctors – A character removed from the service after a viewer complained he was "perverted."

Chester Fisho – Commentary on news that utilized sexual innuendo.

== Mock advertisements ==
Digitiser created spoof advertisements to fill space at the end of subpages. One example was for a fictional German music compilation called Rock Meister!, which used stereotypical German phrasing. It listed artists such as Roxette and The Scorpions. The header "NOT A REAL GERMAN ADVERT" was used instead of the standard "NOT AN ADVERT" after a viewer mistook a previous spoof for a genuine product.

== Reveal button ==
The "reveal" button on the TV remote, typically used for quiz answers, was used to display hidden text. Jokes included surreal non-sequiturs or character comments. The weekend edition often featured stories told through these hidden sections.

On the final page of the last letters section, the reveal button hid an image described as "the real Turner The Worm" (a Teletext character created by Rose). The image was controversial for its resemblance to a phallic symbol.

== Digi-Speak ==
The magazine used a distinctive variation of English, often placing "the" in unusual places or adding suffixes like -uss, -O, -ston, and -me-do. It also coined words such as "huss" (an exclamation of joy). The writers frequently assigned nicknames to letter contributors; for example, a reader named Matt Gander was called "non-shiny goose."

== Legacy and revivals ==
=== Bubblegun.com ===
Bubblegun.com was a website established by Paul Rose that featured contributions from various writers. It was described by Select magazine as one of the UK's top 10 "maverick websites." Rose eventually stopped writing for the site, though it remains as an archive run by designer Steve Horsley.

=== Digitiser 2000 ===
In late 2014, the website Digitiser2000.com launched, featuring games news, reviews, and humour in the style of the original Teletext pages. Written largely by Rose, the site was initially self-funded before moving to a crowdfunding model via Patreon.

=== Mr Biffo's Found Footage ===
In 2017, Rose funded a Kickstarter campaign for "Mr Biffo's Found Footage," a comedy/sci-fi series filmed in a found footage style. The series was released on YouTube in late 2017.

=== Digitiser the Show ===
In 2018, a crowdfunding campaign raised over £44,000 for Digitiser the Show, a six-part YouTube series hosted by Rose, Larry Bundy Jr., Octavius Kitten, Gameplay Jenny, and Paul Gannon. It featured guests from the gaming community and puppets of original Digitiser characters.

A subsequent campaign for a second series, Digitiser the Show: Level 2, raised over £74,000. Filming was planned for 2022 with a release in 2023 to coincide with the magazine's 30th anniversary.

== See also ==
- GameCentral
- Park Avenue
