= Teletext Holidays =

British travel company

- Website type: Private
- Founded: 1992
- Area served: Worldwide
- Industry: Travel, tourism
- Products: Package holidays, hotels
- Services: Travel Agencies
- Website: www.teletextholidays.co.uk

Teletext Holidays is a British travel company established in 1992. The company was owned by Teletext Ltd and initially operated as a teletext service before transitioning to an online platform in the 2010s. In 2021 its parent company Truly Travel entered into liquidation. The brand was revived in 2024.

== History ==
Prior to 1992 Teletext services were available via television sets on the BBC, ITV and Channel 4. In 1992 a new company called Teletext Ltd bought the TV teletext service from previous owners Oracle, which had provided the teletext services on ITV and Channel 4.

On 1 January 1993 Teletext Ltd released a new version of Teletext on TV, with holidays a major part of this revamped offering.

In December 2009 Teletext Ltd removed its services, including Teletext Holidays, from ITV, Channel 4 and Channel 5, leading to a fine of £225,000. Teletext Holidays remained available on Freeview. In October 2012 Ceefax services on BBC also ended.

=== Online offering ===
In late 2010 Teletext Holidays modernised its website. In 2013 the company appointed Truly Travel as their sole provider of package holidays.

=== Data breach ===
In August 2019 it was revealed that Teletext Holidays had left 212,000 customer call recordings on an unprotected server for three years, exposing sensitive personal data.

=== Unpaid refunds and liquidation ===
In February 2021 the UK Competition and Markets Authority (CMA) opened an investigation into Teletext Holidays and its parent company Truly Travel, following hundreds of complains regarding unpaid refunds for holidays cancelled due to the COVID-19 pandemic. The CMA began related court proceedings on 18 October 2021. In November 2021 Truly Travel went into liquidation. On 28 February 2022 the High Court of Justice found that Truly Travel broke the law regarding the unpaid refunds.

The liquidation left Teletext Holidays with no holiday provider and its owners Teletext Ltd sought new buyers. A deal was not struck and in late 2023 Teletext Ltd itself went into liquidation.

=== New owners ===
In 2024 the Teletext Holidays brand was revived by Teletext Travel Ltd., which is unaffiliated with Teletext Ltd or Truly Travel.

== Awards and recognition ==
Teletext Holidays has received industry recognition, including the "Best Online Travel Agent" award at the British Travel Awards in 2018 and 2019, as well as Best Travel Company for All Inclusive Holidays at the British Travel Awards 2025. It was also recognised for "Best All Inclusive Holiday Company" in 2019, and received an award for "Best Use of TV" at The Travel Marketing Awards the same year.
