= Planet Sound =

Former Teletext music page

- Planet Sound banner, May 2007
- Editor: Stephen Eastwood (1997–2001); John Earls (2001–2009)
- Categories: Music
- Frequency: Daily
- Format: Teletext; Online
- Founded: 1997
- Final issue: 14 December 2009
- Company: Teletext Ltd.
- Language: English
- Website: teletext.co.uk/planetsound (archived)

Planet Sound was a British music magazine founded in 1997 by Teletext Ltd. It featured on that company's teletext service (accessible via ITV and Channel 4) and official website. Planet Sound attracted a dedicated community of music fans, facilitated by its letters page, "The Void", and also received endorsements from chart musicians. The magazine was recognised by critics as an authoritative source of music journalism, and its content was reprinted by mainstream news and entertainment outlets including the BBC, NME and Uncut.

Planet Sound was shuttered when Teletext ceased broadcasting in December 2009. The Guardian lamented the closure of "a true one-off... a warm haven of musical discussion and recommendation". Its longest-tenured editor, John Earls – who became synonymous with the magazine – has continued to write music criticism for a variety of publications.

== History ==
Planet Sound has been noted as the successor to Blue Suede Views, a music magazine hosted by Teletext precursor ORACLE in the 1980s and early 1990s. The teenage writings of future Planet Sound editor John Earls – including reviews of ABC and Westworld albums – were published by Blue Suede Views.

Planet Sound was named after the Pixies song, "Planet of Sound". It began in 1997 under editor Stephen Eastwood, with a companion web page also launched that year. Earls served as editor from 2001, becoming synonymous with the magazine. Colin Irwin was also a contributor. Planet Sound featured an assortment of music news, opinions, and reviews of new releases, and purported to give "sane coverage" to indie rock. It hosted a letters page titled "The Void"; those who wrote in were affectionately termed "Voiders". Planet Sound also offered appraisals of demo recordings sent in by budding musicians, and provided The Twilight Sad with their first review. Other bands to receive early media coverage from the magazine included Maxïmo Park and Hope of the States. Planet Sound published news stories daily, with reviews being updated weekly. Rankings of each year's best albums and singles were published annually.

Planet Sound earned a passionate fanbase over the years. Its original content was reproduced in articles by outlets such as the BBC, NME, Uncut, Digital Spy, and Drowned in Sound, who praised the magazine. Teletext neglected to update the online component of Planet Sound after May 1998, although it reappeared in May 2007.

== Closure and aftermath ==
It was announced in July 2009 that Planet Sound was to end in January 2010, although Teletext ultimately ceased broadcasting on 15 December 2009. Peter Ormerod of The Independent lamented Planet Sound's impending closure, calling it "an authoritative, informed and sprightly read from its Pixies-referencing name onwards". The final edition featured musicians Paul Heaton and Nicky Wire paying tribute to Planet Sound and Teletext. Guardian journalist David Renshaw felt that Planet Sound's "sense of community" stood in opposition to the "cutthroat commenting world" of the internet, asserting, "We are losing a true one-off. Future generations will surely find the very concept of Teletext baffling. Today's music news, after all, is distributed by a horde of anonymous bloggers whereas Planet Sound represented something altogether more cosy, a warm haven of musical discussion and recommendation."

Earls established a record label called WET Records, and has continued to write music criticism for a variety of magazines and newspapers. Dave Fawbert of ShortList included Planet Sound in his list of "17 brilliant things we miss about Teletext", writing, "For the avid music fan, forget NME and Melody Maker, Planet Sound on Channel 4 was the most trusted source around." Spiked columnist David Bowden stated, "Anyone trawling around the often overblown and pretentious musings of music websites such as Pitchfork may find themselves yearning for the critical wisdom of John Earls and Colin Irwin on Planet Sound, their evident knowledge and enthusiasm for the job never particularly hampered by 25-odd word limits." The Twilight Sad frontman James Graham said, "I used to read Planet Sound every day. A lot of people my age discovered a lot of their favourite bands on there... I really appreciate the support [Earls] gave us."
