= Digitizer (disambiguation) =

A digitizer is a machine that converts an analog object, image or signal into a digital (i.e. computer-readable) format.

Digitiser, digitizing or digitising may also refer to:

- Graphics tablet or digitizing tablet
- Digitiser, a UK Teletext-based video games magazine
- Digitizer in a touchscreen, the sensor layer between the display and the outer layer of glass or plastic
- Digitizer, a fictional transformation device used in the television show Denji Sentai Megaranger
