= Bamboozle =

Bamboozle means to fool or cheat someone.

Bamboozle or bamboozled may also refer to:

- Bamboozle!, a quiz game that was featured on Channel 4 Teletext in the United Kingdom
- The Bamboozle, an annual three-day music festival held in New Jersey
- Bamboozled, a 2000 satirical film written and directed by Spike Lee
- Bamboozled (soundtrack), the soundtrack to the 2000 film

== See also ==
- Confidence trick
