= Great Expectations (2011 TV series) =

2011 TV serial directed by Brian Kirk

- Genre: Costume drama
- Based on: Great Expectations by Charles Dickens
- Written by: Sarah Phelps
- Directed by: Brian Kirk
- Starring: Douglas Booth; Ray Winstone; Gillian Anderson; David Suchet; Oscar Kennedy
- Composers: Natalie Holt; Martin Phipps
- Country of origin: United Kingdom
- Original language: English
- No. of series: 1
- No. of episodes: 3

Production
- Executive producers: Anne Pivcevic (BBC); Rebecca Eaton (Masterpiece)
- Producer: George Ormond
- Cinematography: Florian Hoffmeister
- Editors: Guy Bensley; Victoria Boydell
- Running time: 55-60 minutes
- Production companies: BBC Productions and Masterpiece co-production

Original release
- Network: BBC One
- Release: 27 December – 29 December 2011

Great Expectations is a three-part BBC television drama adaptation by Sarah Phelps of the 1861 Charles Dickens novel of the same name, starring Ray Winstone as Magwitch, Gillian Anderson as Miss Havisham, Douglas Booth as Pip, Vanessa Kirby as Estella and David Suchet as Jaggers. The adaptation was first broadcast on British television over the Christmas period in 2011.

Anderson's casting as Miss Havisham drew attention to the production due to her being a mere 43 compared to other actresses who have played her. However, critical reception was generally positive. Maxine Audley was also only 43 when she played Miss Havisham in the 1967 BBC adaptation.

In 2012, the PBS broadcast earned the series a total of four Creative Arts Emmy Awards out of five nominations for Outstanding Art Direction, Cinematography, Costumes, and Main Title Design. The remaining nomination was for Outstanding Original Main Title Theme Music.

== Plot ==
=== Part one ===
Young Pip (Oscar Kennedy) is out on the marshes when he meets escaped convict Abel Magwitch (Ray Winstone), who tells him to steal a file so he can remove his shackles. Pip returns, bringing a mutton pie with him along with the file, much to Magwitch’s amazement. Later, Magwitch is re-arrested while fighting with a mysterious fellow escapee (Paul Rhys).

Pip lives with his sister (Claire Rushbrook) and the blacksmith Joe Gargery (Shaun Dooley), who learn from her uncle (Mark Addy) that the reclusive Miss Havisham (Gillian Anderson) needs a young boy. Sure of a reward, Pip’s sister puts him forward, and he becomes a playmate for Havisham's adopted daughter Estella (Izzy Meikle-Small). During his time at the house, Pip becomes convinced that she will become his benefactor and is disappointed when she signs a contract paying for Pip's blacksmith apprenticeship to Joe, even more so when Havisham tells him never to return to see her. While he and Joe are at the house, Pip’s sister is attacked by the evil Orlick (Jack Roth), leaving her bedridden as Pip begins his seven-year apprenticeship.

Seven years later, Pip (now Douglas Booth), having once again seen Estella (now Vanessa Kirby), is visited by the lawyer Jaggers (David Suchet), who informs him that he has an anonymous benefactor who will pay for him to go to London and begin life as a gentleman, on the condition that he must be known only as Pip and must not enquire about the source of the money. Assuming the benefactor to be Havisham, he visits her and promises not to let her down.

=== Part two ===
In London, grown up Pip spends time in the company of Herbert Pocket (Harry Lloyd), racking up debts at a private members club and trying to forget his former life. Pip tells Herbert of his love for Estella but Pocket is wary. He warns Pip that no one knows where Estella came from, that Havisham adopted her from nowhere and from 'friends' no one had ever heard of. Pip, however, chaperones Estella in London, accompanying her to a ball and his feelings grow stronger.

At Jaggers' offices, Pip is berated for his debts, but Pip insists he must impress Havisham to show he is a gentleman. Pip overhears an arrogant client, Bentley Drummle (Tom Burke), also being told off by Jaggers for his ways. Pip attempts to befriend him, but at a dance Drummle shows attention to Estella and taunts Pip, saying he knows he is not a true gentleman.

Jaggers' clerk Wemmick also shows disdain for Pip's background but assists Pip in secretly funding Pocket's new business, which allows Pocket to marry the girl he was thrown out of his family for. Pip attends his sister’s funeral. Alone in his room, Pip awakens to find the convict Magwitch tipping money out of a sack, before revealing himself to be Pip's mysterious benefactor.

=== Part three ===
Pocket stumbles in and after being threatened by Magwitch with a knife to his throat, learns of all. Pip is wary of Magwitch, believing his money must have come from murder. He visits Havisham, meeting Drummle there who gloats of his engagement to Estella. Estella reveals that Pip was brought to the house as a boy for her to practise breaking hearts. After Estella leaves, Pip demands that Havisham explain why she led him on to believe she was his benefactor and that he was meant for Estella. Havisham tells him that Estella is going to break Drummle's heart, but Pip says that Drummle will not care what Estella does.

Pocket finds a place for Magwitch to hide with the help of Wemmick. They discover a large sum of money has been offered by a gentleman from Pip's club for whoever turns in Magwitch. Pip describes him to Magwitch, who reveals his real name to be Compeyson, the man he fought with on the marshes years ago. Pocket and Pip realise Compeyson is the same man who jilted Havisham.

Magwitch assures Pip that the money came from working with sheep, not murder. Pip tells him he has turned his back on his family. Estella has married Drummle, and letters from home are returned unopened to Havisham. Pip, unwilling to accept Magwitch's money, realises that Pocket's new business is in danger, so he goes to Havisham for money. Reluctantly she gives it to him, then asks and receives his forgiveness. While burning old love letters from Compeyson, she is caught up in the flames and burns to death; Pip turns back but is too late to save her.

Magwitch reveals that he was married to a woman called Molly and they had a daughter, but when he went away for work their associate Compeyson tried to rape her, and Molly fought him off. Compeyson reported Molly for attempted murder and she was put in jail. Magwitch returned to find his wife in jail and was told of his daughter's death. Though his wife was spared hanging by Jaggers, Magwitch began drinking and fell into crime. He ended up arrested for a crime both he and Compeyson had committed; Compeyson received two years and Magwitch life.

Pocket and Wemmick find a trustworthy ship to sail Magwitch away from London, and Pip decides to go with him. Orlick discovers Pip's association with Magwitch and tells Compeyson. Orlick attacks Pip, yet Pip overpowers him and leaves for the ship. As they row towards the ship, Compeyson and guards approach on another boat; Magwitch stabs Compeyson to death, but is severely beaten by the guards before being taken to prison to await hanging.

Pip goes to Jaggers and, seeing his housekeeper Molly, realises she is Magwitch's Molly. After freeing her from jail, Jaggers took her on as his servant. He also realises that Estella was Molly's and Magwitch's daughter. Pip goes to Magwitch on his deathbed and tells him that his daughter is alive and loved before Magwitch dies.

Estella marries Drummle who, after repeatedly abusing his horse, is kicked to death by it, freeing Estella, who also shows signs of his abuse with bruised shoulders. She becomes the inheritor of Havisham's and Drummle's estates. Pip, still in one pound's worth of debt to his collectors, intends to leave London, but Wemmick informs him that it has been paid by Joe, whom he had written to asking for help. Pip returns home and begs and receives Joe's forgiveness. Pip goes to Havisham's house where he finds Estella. The pair share a tender scene in the drive.

== Cast ==
In credits order.

- Douglas Booth as Philip "Pip" Pirrip
- Ray Winstone as Abel Magwitch
- Gillian Anderson as Miss Havisham
- David Suchet as Jaggers
- Mark Addy as Uncle Pumblechook
- Frances Barber as Mrs Brandley
- Tom Burke as Bentley Drummle
- Charlie Creed-Miles as Sergeant
- Shaun Dooley as Joe Gargery
- Oscar Kennedy as Young Pip
- Vanessa Kirby as Estella
- Harry Lloyd as Herbert Pocket
- Susan Lynch as Molly
- Izzy Meikle-Small as Young Estella
- Paul Rhys as Compeyson / Denby
- Paul Ritter as John Wemmick
- Jack Roth as Dolge Orlick
- Claire Rushbrook as Mrs. Joe
- Perdita Weeks as Clara
- Mary Roscoe as Hannah, Miss Havisham's maid
- Andrew Bone as Raymond Pocket, Herbert's father
- Abigail Bond as Camilla Pocket, Herbert's mother
- Eros Vlahos as Young Herbert Pocket
- Michael Colgan as Anxious Man
- Steve Lately as Mike, Jaggers' clerk
- Will Tudor as Estella's Admirer
- Dave Legeno as Borrit, jailer at Newgate

== Production ==
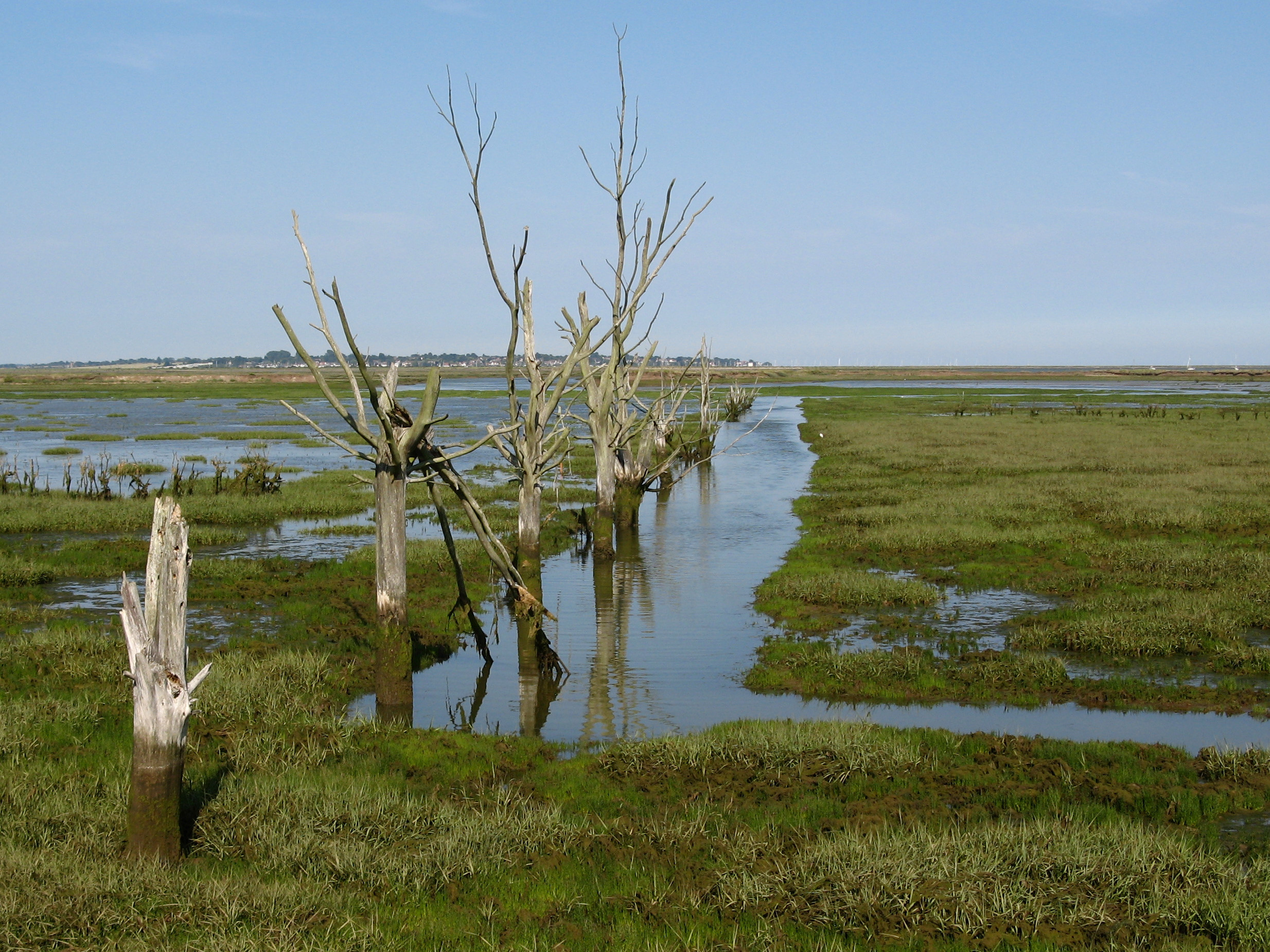
The opening shot of the series was filmed here off Tollesbury Fleet, showing Magwitch emerging from the marsh

In July 2011, over three days of filming, Holdenby House near Northampton was used by the BBC for the exterior set of Satis House. The interior scenes of Satis House were filmed on location in Langleybury Mansion, a former country house and estate near Watford, Hertfordshire.

The Gargery House/Forge was built at RSPB Old Hall Marshes, near the Essex village of Tollesbury, whilst the village church seen in the opening scenes of the series was the St Thomas a Beckett church, located in the deserted Kent village of Fairfield on the Romney Marsh.

== Reception ==
In the UK the first part of the adaptation received the highest viewing figures in its time slot, gaining 6.6 million viewers.

=== Casting ===
The casting of Gillian Anderson as the obsessive jilted bride Miss Havisham drew attention to the production due to her being a mere 43 years old compared to other actresses who have played her. The move was generally accepted with The Independent saying "Phelps's biggest liberty, making Miss Havisham young and beautiful... didn't greatly worry me, because Gillian Anderson nicely captured the continuing hysteria of her obsession." The Guardian said that "some people have been moaning that Gillian Anderson isn't old enough to be Miss Havisham, that she's a cougar rather than a crone, too ravishing for Havisham. She's not that ravishing, though. They've done a pretty good job of ageing and witchifying her. And, more importantly, she feels like Miss Havisham". The Daily Telegraph also praised her saying "this pale yet still beautiful wraith, mouth in need of lip salve and Baby Jane ringlets slowly unravelling, speaking in insidious singsong instead of the usual dotty dowager tones. This was a Miss Havisham who has never really grown up." The Telegraph also pointed out that Anderson is only a little younger than the generally considered definitive version of Miss Havisham as played by Martita Hunt in the David Lean version, a point that Anderson herself made on The Graham Norton Show. Maxine Audley, who portrayed Miss Havisham in the BBC's 1967 adaptation, was also only 43 when she played the role, but little attention was drawn to this at the time.
