= Izzy Meikle-Small =

British actress (born 1996)

- Born: Isobel Hope Meikle-Small; 22 March 1996 (age 30); Hove, East Sussex, England
- Education: King's College London
- Occupation: Actress
- Years active: 2007–present

Isobel Hope Meikle-Small (born 22 March 1996) is an English actress. She began her career as a child actress in the films Never Let Me Go (2010), Snow White and the Huntsman and Private Peaceful (both 2012). She has since appeared in the Starz series Outlander (2023–).

== Early life and education ==
Meikle-Small was born in Hove. She attended Brighton College, where she completed A Levels in English literature, politics, and photography and earned A*s in all three subjects. She went on to graduate in 2018 with a Bachelor of Arts in English Literature from King's College London.

== Career ==
Meikle-Small is best known for portraying young Kathy H. in the 2010 film Never Let Me Go. She played the younger version of the actress Carey Mulligan, to whom she has a close resemblance. In December 2011, Meikle-Small was also in the BBC miniseries Great Expectations (2011) where she played young Estella and Vanessa Kirby played the older Estella. During this role she also studied for her GCSEs at Brighton College and achieved 9 A*s. She appeared in the 2012 film Private Peaceful as young Molly and young Ravenna in the 2012 fantasy film Snow White and the Huntsman.

In July 2014, Meikle-Small played Molly in Pudsey the Dog: The Movie.

In 2022, she was cast as Rachel Hunter in the seventh season of Outlander.

== Filmography ==
Year	Title	Role	Notes
2007	Tchaikovsky: 'Fortune and Tragedy	Sasha	TV movie
2010	Disco	Pippa	Short film
2010	Never Let Me Go	Young Kathy H.	
2011	Great Expectations	Young Estella	TV Miniseries; episode 1.1
2012	Snow White and the Huntsman	Young Ravenna	
2012	Private Peaceful	Young Molly	
2014	The 7.39	Charlotte Matthews	TV Miniseries
2014	Pudsey the Dog: The Movie	Molly	
2016	Ripper Street	Valerie Freeman	2 episodes
2017	Another Mother's Son	Annie	
2023–present	Outlander	Rachel Hunter	
2026	Call the Midwife	Thelma Cutler	season 15 episode 1
