= Bamboozle! =

UK teletext quiz game

- The Boozler Family, shown in the final Bamboozle! article on 15 December 2009.
- Genre: Quiz game
- Created by: Julian Edwards
- Starring: The Boozler Family
- Country of origin: United Kingdom
- Original language: English
- No. of episodes: 5,900

Production
- Production company: Teletext Ltd.

Original release
- Network: Teletext on Channel 4
- Release: 1 January 1993 – 15 December 2009

Bamboozle! is a quiz game featured on Channel 4 Teletext in the United Kingdom. It was originally part of Teletext's "Fun & Games" category, though the rest of the category had been discontinued for some years before Bamboozle! ended (due to the general discontinuation of all Teletext news and editorial content in December 2009). The last edition, themed around 'Ends and Lasts', appeared on Monday 14 December 2009. The Boozler 'family' appeared one last time on Tuesday 15 December 2009 saying farewell to the Teletext audience.

On 9 August 2010 Bamboozle! was given a new home by Teletext Ltd. on the iPhone complete with all the retro graphics (no longer available). On 11 July 2019, Teletext Holidays launched a version of the Bamboozle quiz on their 404 error page.

Bamboozle! was originally intended as a real-time game that could be played in conjunction with a broadcast TV programme using a similar multiple choice format as Who Wants to Be a Millionaire?. The decision by the new broadcast teletext franchise holders (Teletext UK) in 1993 to opt for X.25 packet switching meant that it was impossible to adequately synchronise the broadcast of teletext content in the context of a TV programme. The format thus fell back to the form it had operated in largely unchanged since 1994.

== The game ==
The game used Fastext keys (different coloured buttons on the TV remote control) to select the desired answer from a choice of four, and was "presented" by virtual host Bamber Boozler, who derived his name from the word "bamboozle" and the name of University Challenge host Bamber Gascoigne.

Bamber Boozler's appearance was constrained by the limitations of the Level 1 World System Teletext alpha mosaic display format. Teletext pioneer & engineer Greg Nicholas created the quiz "Bamber Boozler" and the character "Bamber Boozler". The idea came about in the early 1980s when Nicholas was working with Teletext Equipment manufacturers in the UK. In later years, journalists Charlie Ghagan and Roger Wilkinson oversaw the quiz. Wilkinson also provides content for the Teletext iPhone app.

== The Boozler family ==
Quizmaster Bamber Boozler's family members were introduced over the game's first few years. Bamber's wife, Bambette normally appeared when a question was answered incorrectly and Saturday's Junior Bamboozle quizzes, which were generally easier than the weekday editions, were presented by Bamber's son, Buster, with Bambette's role filled by Bonnie, his daughter. A later addition was Brian Boozler who hosted a sports version called "Ten To One".

== Gameplay ==
A new set of questions was originally given each week, but this soon became more regular, eventually becoming daily. Each game originally had 25 questions, later reduced to 20, then 15 and eventually 12; on a very few special occasions there were 30 questions.

At one point in the quiz's history, the red, yellow and green keys were sensible answers and the blue was mostly reserved for a comical response (which was occasionally the correct one). This was later changed and all the keys would have sensible answers.

The player was required to answer all questions correctly in order to complete the quiz, but were allowed multiple attempts to do so. Initially, if a question was answered incorrectly, the player would have to start again from Question 1; this was later amended so that a maximum of three questions would need to be answered again. After completing the quiz, there was a score table with themed responses, for example:

Score	Response
12	Super star
10–11	Martian master
8–9	Clever comet
6–7	Middling meteor
3–5	Plodding Pluto
0–2	Total eclipse

according to how many questions were answered correctly at the first attempt.

== "Bad Luck" pages ==
The "Bad Luck" pages appeared when questions were answered incorrectly; they initially featured trivia at first and then mainly birthday announcements. This was scrapped to introduce "Bambette's Bonus" (or Bonnie's Bonus in Junior Bamboozle) where contestants could score again with a question from her. This was not a multiple-choice question and contestants could get the answer by pressing the reveal button.

== Themes ==
On particular dates the quiz was themed: for example Halloween featured related questions and images of skeletons and spiders, whilst Guy Fawkes Night featured firework-based questions, and there were numerous Christmas-themed versions. There were also special "name the picture/person" graphical editions.

== Weekly competition ==
The makers of Bamboozle! introduced a weekly competition whereby a viewer could contribute the questions to Bamboozle! As well as having their questions used, names mentioned and their image appear on screen (the viewer could supply a photograph, which was converted to a Teletext-style cartoon); the winning contributors also received a £20 WHSmith gift voucher. Even before this, viewer-submitted questions were used in various forms ever since the early days of the quiz.

== Spin offs ==
Back in the early days of Bamboozle!, on a number of occasions the quiz would be replaced by an adventure game (a different one each time), based on the popular children's fantasy programme "Knightmare". Viewers had to use the fastext keys to navigate their way through the quest.

"Ten to One", was a sports version of Bamboozle! with the host Brian Boozler. The quiz was so called because it presented ten sports questions and players had to get from the ten down to one. It is a double meaning as Ten to One also relates to bookies popular odds on betting in many sports.

This quiz ran concurrently with Bamboozle! for sometime until late 1998 where Brian said "I'm putting down the mic for a bit, I'm back in 1999...", however it never returned. He was however, during the period that the quiz was "rested", a guest quizmaster on Bamboozle! asking the contestants sports questions like before, with Bamber saying at the end "Thanks Brian..... check your score below!".

== See also ==
- Digitiser
- Park Avenue
- List of teletext services
