= Paul Rose (writer) =

British screenwriter, a.k.a. Mr. Biffo

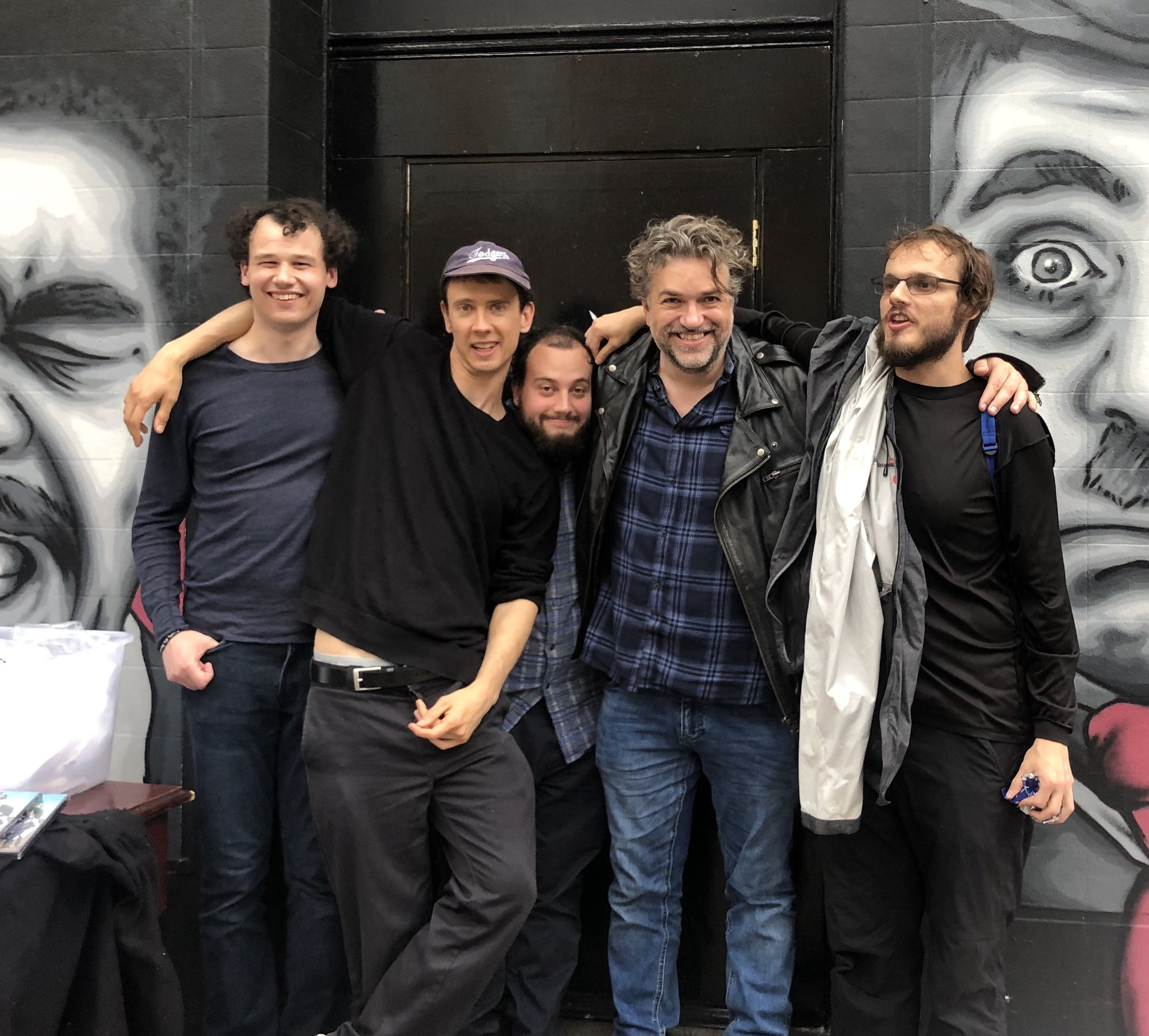
- Asperger's Are Us with Paul Rose (2nd from right)
- Born: 5 August 1971 (age 55)
- Occupation: Screenwriter
- Spouse: Sanja Rose
- Children: 3, and 3 step-children
- Writing career
- Pen name: Mr Biffo
- Period: 1993–present
- Genres: Children's television; Video games; Music podcasts
- Notable works: 4 O'Clock Club; Dani's Castle; Dani's House; Digitiser; My Parents Are Aliens; Pudsey the Dog: The Movie
- Notable awards: Radio Academy Award (Breakfast Music, 2003); RTS Programme Award (Children's Fiction, 2015); Three-time BAFTA nominee (2004, 2012, 2017)

Paul Rose (born 1971), known by his online persona Mr Biffo, is a British screenwriter. He was the editor of the Teletext-based video games magazine Digitiser, which ran between 1993 and 2003, and is a BAFTA-nominated writer of children's television.

== Career ==
=== Video games ===
In 1993 Rose founded the Teletext-based video games magazine Digitiser. This ran until 2003, with the service reaching over 1.5 million viewers a week.

In 2014, the Digitiser brand returned as an online website titled Digitiser 2000, penned by Rose. This was followed in 2018 by a video series, Digitiser: The Show, a retrogaming magazine show funded through Kickstarter. The programme now takes the form of shorter weekly uploads to its YouTube page, titled Digitiser Mini.

Rose has also written for Official PlayStation Magazine and Retro Gamer. From 2003 to 2008 he also wrote a monthly column in Edge entitled Biffovision.

Rose also devised the storyline for the multi-format video game Future Tactics.

=== Children's television ===
Rose is the co-creator and lead writer of the CBBC sitcoms Dani's House, its follow-up Dani's Castle and the programme 4 O'Clock Club, which was nominated for 'Best Children's Comedy' at the 2012 BAFTA Children's Awards. Rose has also worked on the CITV series My Parents are Aliens, which itself was nominated for 'Best Children's Drama' at the 2004 BAFTAs.

Rose has also worked on shows such as Half Moon Investigations, Barking!, The Worst Witch and Sooty.

In 2019, Rose co-created (with Jeremy Salsby) the CBBC show Almost Never, a comedy-drama series starring Emily Atack and Kimberly Wyatt.

=== Other work ===
As well as his work on Children's television, Rose has also contributed to a number of programmes for adult audiences, including The Armstrong and Miller Show, a 2003 episode of UK soap opera EastEnders and the fourth series of Stella. He has also written for numerous film and technology magazines, including Deathray, Empire, Total Film and .net.

In 2003, Rose won a Sony Radio Academy Award for his writing on The Christian O'Connell Breakfast Show on XFM.

In 2007, Rose co-wrote a TV pilot, which was broadcast on BBC Three, titled Biffovision. It was produced by Hartswood Films and is a parody of children's television co-written with Tim Moore. He has also written a number of non-broadcast television pilots, including Too Much Too Young and Now The Weather.

In May 2007, Rose published the book Confessions of a Chatroom Freak through Friday Books, which has since gone into liquidation. In it, Rose posed as a beautiful young woman called LoopyLisa21f who chatted to men online, mostly about sexual acts they wanted to do to Lisa, and then published the transcripts.

In 2014, Rose was the screenwriter of Pudsey: The Movie, a film starring the Britain's Got Talent winner Pudsey the Dog. Pudsey is voiced for the movie by David Walliams.

In 2017, Rose successfully funded a Kickstarter campaign to bring together Mr Biffo's Found Footage, a comedy montage series in the found footage style, which culminated in a short sci fi film featuring Violet Berlin.

In September 2020, Rose started his own podcast via the Acast network. Titled Between You And Me, the series features Rose and his wife Sanja exploring the back-catalogue of British rock band Marillion.
