= Telesoftware =

Transmission of software via teletext

The term telesoftware was coined by W.J.G. Overington who invented the concept in 1974; it literally means “software at a distance” and it often refers to the transmission of programs for a microprocessor or home computer via broadcast teletext, though the use of teletext was just a convenient way to implement the invention, which had been invented as a theoretical broadcasting concept previously. The concept being of producing local interactivity without the need for a return information link to a central computer. The invention arose as spin-off from research on function generators for a hybrid computer system for use in simulation of heat transfer in food preservation, and thus from outside of the broadcasting research establishments.

Software bytes are presented to a terminal as pairs of standard teletext characters, thus utilizing an existing and well-proven broadcasting system.

== History ==
Telesoftware was pioneered in the UK during the 1970s and 1980s, and a paper on the subject was presented by R.H. Vivian (IBA) and W.J.G. Overington at the 1978 International Broadcasting Convention.

The world first test broadcast took place on ITV Oracle in February 1977, though there was no equipment available to use the software at that time. The broadcast simply produced a display of the encoded software, for a Signetics 2650 microprocessor, on a teletext television. However, the fact that the broadcast took place gave the concept practical credibility of something that was realistically possible for the future.

At the 1978 International Broadcasting Convention a demonstration of telesoftware working from a live feed of ITV Oracle teletext was presented on an exhibition stand by Mr Hedger. The Oracle signal being carried within the ITV signal. At one stage the ITV signal was routed via a communication satellite as part of a television demonstration, and the opportunity was used to test telesoftware using that signal that had been routed via the communication satellite, and it worked well.

Also, a display maquette, with the title Telesoftware Tennis had been broadcast live for a few minutes on ITV Oracle in November or December 1976. Although that was just during a discussion of the future possibilities for telesoftware, the development in the 21st century of retrieving teletext pages from super-VHS recordings means that if anyone was recording the ITV television broadcast on super-VHS videotape at that time, then that maquette page could potentially be recovered from the tape by teletext archaeologists, as potentially could the broadcasts from 1977 mentioned above and the broadcasts made in 1978 at the time of the International Broadcasting Convention. Such technique has already been used to recover and archive telesoftware broadcasts made in the 1980s by the BBC.

During that time, software was broadcast at various times on all of the (then) four terrestrial TV channels. Telesoftware and tutorials were available on Ceefax (BBC teletext service) for the BBC Micro via its teletext adapter between 1983 and 1989 and was generally transmitted for a period of one week. The BBC Ceefax Telesoftware service was managed by Jeremy Brayshaw. Most of the Telesoftware programming tutorials were written by Gordon Horsington and they, as well as most of the software, are still available from the online Telesoftware archives (see the external links below). Gathering of the software (often referred to as "downloading", though, as there was no uplink request needed nor used, not really "downloading" as such) could take place from Friday evening to the following Thursday evening. As the updating took place on a Friday, it was advised not to attempt to gather the software between 9 am and 7 pm on Fridays.

Other channels provided for several other computers via a range of adapters and set-top boxes. The same delivery system was also used to deliver satellite weather images from the Meteosat satellite for download.

Although none of the early telesoftware initiatives survived, many of the techniques are now at the heart of the latest digital television systems.

Various archives of BBC Ceefax Telesoftware are preserved on the internet.

== See also ==
- ORACLE (teletext)
- Multimedia Home Platform
- BASICODE
- Timeline of teletext in the UK
