= Future Tactics: The Uprising =

2004 video game

- North American cover art for PlayStation 2
- Developer: Zed Two
- Publishers: NA: Crave Entertainment; EU: JoWooD Productions
- Composer: Tim Follin
- Platforms: PlayStation 2 GameCube; Xbox; Windows
- Release: NA: May 7, 2004; PAL: October 22, 2004; PAL: December 5, 2004 (PS2)
- Genre: Tactical shooter
- Modes: Single-player, multiplayer

Future Tactics: The Uprising is a turn based tactical shooter video game by Zed Two. Once known as Pillage, this turn based shooter was stuck in development for a number of years before being picked up by Crave for a US release, followed shortly by JoWood for a European release. It plays similarly to the Worms 3D games and has a story penned by Paul Rose. The game features a geo-mod system in which almost anything can be destroyed, leaving battlefields scarred by craters. It was released on PlayStation 2, Xbox, GameCube and Windows.

The plot of the game revolves around Low, his sister Pepper, and any other survivors they can find, trying to rid the world of the mysterious and malevolent "creatures" that are slowly taking over the planet.

== Gameplay ==
Gameplay always involves a set of two teams. One team moves all its players, and then the other. The characters fire by aiming at a target and then matching two lines for the precise firing zone. Depending on the upgrades received, the player characters may also zoom in or add an extra boost of power before firing. Firing can destroy parts of the environment, which is one of the selling points of the game. Character progression is based on experience attained from killing enemies, or finding hidden items in the environment.

Although not a new game plus in the traditional sense, if a player continues the game after finishing all 19 episodes, a change to the turn mechanics in combat is made. Instead of an entire team moving at a time, only one character may move before it becomes the other team's turn. Turns are then rotated throughout the characters.

== Development and release ==
Development began on April 1, 2001 by British studio Zed Two, with the game was originally titled 'Pillage' and set to be release by Rage Games; however, financial hardships faced by Rage led to the company being unable to pay the ~$1 million owed to Zed Two on the publishing contract, leading to a new publisher being sought. The game was eventually published by Crave in North America and JoWood in Europe. Zed Two faced challenges in finding publishers, which the developers attributed to the unorthodox multi-genre gameplay of the title and status as a new intellectual property. Eventually, the game released for the budget price of $19.99 in North America.

A Gizmondo version was planned, but cancelled after Tiger Telematics went bankrupt.
