= Timeline of in vision teletext broadcasts in the UK =

This is a timeline of the history of on-air broadcasts of teletext on television in the UK.

== 1980s ==
- 1980
  - 12 March – The UK's very first in-vision teletext transmission is broadcast. It is a 30-minute sample of Ceefax pages, shown on BBC1 between 8:30am and 9am. A short time later, two 30-minute broadcasts, usually aired at 10am and 3:30pm, begin on BBC2. The pages chosen showcase various aspects of the Ceefax service and consists of a digest of news, sport, weather, TV listings and other topics. The in-vision broadcasts are designed to help promote the Ceefax service and what it offers, along with teletext in general. The broadcasts, called Ceefax in Vision, are not referred to in the Radio Times or on newspapers’ television listings pages.
- 1981
  - No events.
- 1982
  - April–June – During the Falklands War, Ceefax pages are sometimes broadcast instead of the test card to keep viewers up to date with the latest developments. Two special sombre tapes are used during this period to reduce the risk of a lapse of taste.
- 1983
  - 14 January – Ahead of the launch of Breakfast Time, the final 8:30am 30-minute Ceefax broadcast is shown on BBC1.
  - 28 February – BBC1 begins broadcasting a 30-minute Ceefax slot prior to the start of Breakfast Time. It is called Ceefax AM. It is first mentioned in the Radio Times on 21 March.
  - 18 March – Channel 4 broadcasts in-vision teletext pages for the first time. Two magazines are shown – 4-Tel on View and Oracle on View – and air in fifteen minute bursts which are repeated several times each day prior to the start of each day's transmission. The pages are alternated with showings of the ETP-1 test card and are shown on weekdays during the afternoon.
  - 2 May – Ceefax in Vision starts to be broadcast during all daytime downtime although, until September, BBC2 continues to fully close down after Play School between 11:30am and 3:30pm when there is a programme gap of more than two hours.
  - 19 September – The BBC's daytime education service Daytime on Two is broadcast for the first time and a special sequence of Ceefax pages, called the Daytime on Two Information Service, is broadcast during the longer gaps between programmes.
  - October – Ceefax in Vision is seen through the morning and into the afternoon on BBC2 at the weekend for the first time during the Open University’s off-season. They continue to be shown on weekend mornings until the OU reopens for the new term at the start of February. The only other all-morning weekend Ceefax broadcast until the following October is over the Easter weekend.
  - 5 December – Following the end of the Daytime on Two term, Ceefax is shown non-stop throughout the day on BBC2 for the first time with transmissions running continuously from around 9am until the start of programmes at 5:35pm.
- 1984
  - 7 January – Daytime Ceefax transmissions are renamed Pages from Ceefax following the decision by the Radio Times to begin listing daytime Ceefax broadcasts. And by then, the start time for BBC2’s Ceefax broadcasts is fixed at 9am.
  - Viewers in London and the South East see a two-minute weekday mid-afternoon Ceefax broadcast. It is aired during the slot when the rest of the UK is broadcasting its afternoon regional news summary - a full regional news service for the area did not launch in the area until the following year. The pages shown are usually from the Ceefax Newsreel sequence rather than the usual Ceefax miscellany.
  - May and June – During the summer term, the lunchtime adult education programmes are not shown, apart for ad-hoc Open University programmes, and during the longer lunchtime gaps, the Daytime on Two Information Service is replaced by the usual Ceefax miscellany. This also occurs during the 1985 summer term lunchtime programme gaps.
  - 4–13 August – During the second week of the 1984 Summer Olympic Games, the BBC extends its live coverage until around 4am. Rather than closing down, the BBC fills the gap with Ceefax Olympics AM which provides news from the Games to fill the gap between the end of live coverage and the start of Olympic Breakfast Time. This is the first time that Ceefax pages are broadcast overnight.
  - 15 October – An extension of Channel 4’s broadcasting hours sees teletext transmissions broadcast earlier, running continuously from 10am until 1:45pm, albeit with the ETP-1 testcard shown between 45 and 00 past the hour, as opposed to the previous hours of between 1pm until 4:15pm.
- 1985
  - 7 January – Afternoon Pages from Ceefax broadcasts appear on BBC1 between the end of lunchtime programmes and the start of children's programmes, and on BBC2 Ceefax pages are shown continuously between 9am and 5:25pm apart from when Daytime on Two is in season and when sporting events are being shown.
  - 18 February – Ceefax AM’s broadcast time is extended from 30 to 50 minutes following the retiming of Breakfast Time to a later time slot.
  - 28 June – The end of the 1984/85 school year sees the closure of the Daytime on Two Information Service as when Daytime on Two returns in September, all gaps of up to 10 minutes are filled by interval captions and for breaks of more than 10 minutes, the usual Ceefax miscellany is shown.
  - 8 September – BBC1 shows Pages from Ceefax on Sunday mornings for the final time as from next year repeats are shown during the adult educational Sunday morning slot's summer break.
- 1986
  - February – For the first time, animated graphics are seen during teletext transmissions. This is made possible by transmitting 4-Tel on View from a disc rather than live. Oracle On View continues to be broadcast live.
  - 2 April – The first in-vision teletext service is seen on ITV when Central launches its Jobfinder service which broadcasts for one hour after the end of the day's programming.
  - 9 September – The last ever non-stop all-day BBC2 Pages from Ceefax broadcast takes place.
  - 14 October – Ahead of the 27 October launch of the BBC's daytime television service, BBC2 begins late afternoon programming by showing a film during the second half of the gap between the end of Daytime on Two and the start of the evening's programmes. Consequently, Ceefax broadcasts now end at just before 4pm.
  - 24 October – Pages from Ceefax is shown during the day on BBC1 for the final time.
  - 8 December – Following the launch of the BBC's daytime service, BBC2's broadcast hours are also extended. Consequently, during the school holidays, Pages from Ceefax now ends at 2pm.
- 1987
  - For a brief period, Oracle pages are shown prior to the start of TV-am’s programmes. The sequence is called Daybreak and mainly consists of information about TV-am. This ends in September when TV-am begins its broadcasts at 6am.
  - 30 January – Yorkshire becomes the second ITV region to launch a Jobfinder service, broadcasting for an hour after closedown.
  - 25 April – Central becomes the first UK television station to use teletext pages to fully fill overnight downtime when, following a programme hours extension, Central fills that downtime with its Jobfinder service.
  - May–August – BBC2 moves its afternoon start time to 3pm for the summer, thereby giving Pages from Ceefax an extra hour in the absence of any other programming.
  - 12 June – On the morning after the 1987 United Kingdom general election, BBC2 broadcasts a Ceefax Results Service, running from 7:20am until the start of Daytime on Two at 10:04am.
  - 14 September
    - ITV Schools programmes transfer to Channel 4 resulting in an expansion of the channel's weekday broadcasting hours. Consequently, teletext pages move to an earlier slot, beginning at 7.30am and running to 9:28am during the term, and from 8am until 11:45am when schools programmes were not being shown.
    - The content of Oracle on View changes from focussing on one aspect of the ORACLE output to being a news service.
  - 11 October – Sunday Ceefax transmissions all-but end following the decision to launch a new children's strand Now on Two during the Open University off-season. Consequently, just a few minutes of Ceefax pages are now broadcast on Sunday mornings. On Saturdays, Ceefax continues to air throughout the morning, generally until around midday.
  - 7 December – The first night-long teletext broadcast takes place in the UK when Tyne Tees launches its Jobfinder service. It airs the service from its usual closedown time of just after midnight until TV-am starts at 6am.
- 1988
  - Teletext pages are sometimes shown on Channel 4 after closedown, airing for a few minutes after the end of the closedown sequence, and after a brief showing of the ETP-1 testcard. The pages are accompanied by tone, and end when transmitters disconnect from the Channel 4 feed ahead of each transmitter’s overnight switch-off.
  - The Summer Daytime on Two break sees the return of the post lunchtime Children's BBC Ceefax broadcast on BBC2 but it's only a 25-minute transmission as afternoon programmes during the summer of 1988 begin at 2pm.
  - 18 August – The level 2 in-vision generator is used for Pages from Ceefax broadcasts for the first time. However these broadcasts are mainly confined to BBC1 from 1990 until 1994.
  - The commencement of 24-hour broadcasting on ITV sees many regions launching a teletext Jobfinder service as part of their overnight offering with almost all ITV regions using Level 2 teletext graphics. Jobfinder broadcasts are aired in the hour prior to the start of the ITN Morning News at 5am.
  - October 1988 to January 1989 – This is the final period that Ceefax is aired all morning on Saturdays during the Open University's Winter break.
- 1989
  - 31 March – The last Oracle on View transmission takes place.
  - 3 April – Channel 4 launches its breakfast television service The Channel Four Daily and from this date, 4-Tel on View is shown in a single 40-minute block rather than in 15 minute bursts. It is also shown at the weekend for the first time.
  - 16 June – Pages from Ceefax is shown after 10am for the final time as from Monday 19th, BBC2 begins broadcasting programmes when Daytime on Two is not on air at 10am rather than at lunchtime.
  - 15 September – Ceefax AM is broadcast for the final time.
  - 20 November – The Ceefax service is revamped to focus mainly on news. Consequently, the in-vision sequence changes dramatically. Gone are the magazine elements with Pages from Ceefax now consisting of a 13-page 'Newsreel' with the 14th page being a title page although for the first few months a weather map and forecast is added on the end of the sequence.
  - 22 November – Following the commencement of televised coverage of the House of Commons the previous day, BBC launches a breakfast news-based service service. Pages from Ceefax between the end of the Open University broadcast until the 8am bulletin from Breakfast News which precedes a round-up of yesterday's events in Parliament, and when the OU of not being aired, Pages from Ceefax airs from 7.30 until 8am.

== 1990s ==
- 1990
  - 2 January – The 30-minute weekday 6am Ceefax slot returns to BBC1 but the content is the same as for all other Ceefax broadcasts and therefore is listed in the same way, as Pages from Ceefax.
  - April – Pages from Ceefax is broadcast after 9am for the final time.
- 1991
  - 17–27 January – During the early stages of the Gulf War, BBC1 keeps its transmitters on air overnight to bring viewers the latest information, and uses Ceefax pages to provide that overnight service.
- 1992
  - 16 November – Following the relaunch of the Ceefax service, the content seen on Pages from Ceefax is increased. The number of pages is more than doubled and the end of the sequence sees the introduction of headline pages for finance, sport and the weather maps and forecast and occasionally travel news. The age number for the in-vision service changes for the first time, moving from 198 to 196.
- 1993
  - 4 January – BBC1 begins broadcasting on weekdays at 6am. A start of day Ceefax broadcast is retained although it now runs for 15 minutes rather than 30.
  - Channel 4 starts broadcasting 4-Tel on View during its overnight closedowns.
  - April – A weekend 7am Ceefax transmission begins on BBC1, and this broadcast is included in TV listings. This continues until later in the year when programmes at 7am start being introduced.
- 1994
  - February – Level 2 teletext graphics are used for the first time. Their introduction coincides with a major change to the in-vision service which sees a significant expansion to the number of pages shown. Rather than just a headline page, sports news items return alongside several pages of financial prices and several pages of travel news. TV listings for all four channels are also shown. In addition, title pages for each section return. However, the expanded content of the Pages from Ceefax broadcasts are confined to the 15 minutes prior to the start of programmes, which means that often there isn't sufficient time to show the entire sequence, which is now between 40 and 50 pages in length.
- 1995
  - 16 October – BBC Learning Zone launches and Pages from Ceefax is broadcast in the gaps between the end of regular programmes and the start of Learning Zone broadcasts. This is the first time that Ceefax is broadcast overnight on a regular basis.
- 1996
  - March – Pages from Ceefax returns to the Level 1 broadcasting format.
  - 16 November – A major shake-up of the Ceefax service sees the in-vision sequence change back to a sequence of news pages which are fronted by headline pages for news, finance, sport and travel. The number of pages shown is halved and the title pages are removed. The page number also changes, from 196 to 152. Also, the top line is removed from the in-vision broadcasts.
- 1997
  - 6 January – Channel 4 starts 24-hour broadcasting, resulting in the end of 4-Tel on View.
  - 24 May – BBC One Scotland begins using Ceefax as an opt-out filler programme for four consecutive Saturday mornings at 7am, displacing US comedy series Harry and the Hendersons airing elsewhere across the UK throughout this short-term period, the temporary opt out ends on 14 June then returned at the same timeslot for the next three Saturday mornings beginning 16 until 30 August.
  - 9 November – Pages from Ceefax is broadcast nationally on BBC1 for the final time as from the following day, all overnight downtime is replaced by an overnight simulcast of BBC News 24 which launches on this day. Pages from Ceefax continues to be occasionally shown on BBC One Scotland when there is a gap between the end of an opt-out and the return to the network.
- 1998
  - 14 January – ITV Nightscreen launches as an overnight filler on ITV. Broadcast as teletext pages, the service features news and information about ITV and its programmes.
- 1999
  - In mid 1999, the top line is restored to Pages from Ceefax.

== 2000s and 2010s ==
- 2000
  - No events.
- 2001
  - No events.
- 2002
  - After six years, the weather maps are reintroduced to Pages from Ceefax broadcasts.
- 2003
  - Teletext pages are no longer used for ITV Nightscreen when the format of the pages is transferred to a format using Scala InfoChannel3.
- 2004
  - A reduction in airtime for BBC Learning Zone means that more airtime is given over to Pages from Ceefax.
- 2005
  - 5 September – A 6am to 7am broadcast of Pages from Ceefax is introduced as a replacement for the 6am CBeebies programming block.
- 2006
  - 22 December – The breakfast Ceefax broadcasts end ahead of the return of the 6am CBeebies hour.
- 2007 to 2011
  - No specific events but this period sees a significant amount of airtime given over to Pages from Ceefax, especially at the weekend, with some transmissions running for as long as five hours. They are broadcast from the end of BBC Two's BBC News 24 simulcast until the start of children's programmes at 6am.
- 2012
  - 22 October – At 5:59am the final transmission of Pages from Ceefax comes to an end with special continuity announcements and a specially created end caption featuring various Ceefax graphics from over the years.

== See also ==
- Timeline of teletext in the UK
