= Pudsey the Dog: The Movie =

- Theatrical release poster
- Directed by: Nick Moore
- Written by: Paul Rose
- Produced by: Michael Leviten; Rupert Preston
- Starring: David Walliams; Jessica Hynes; John Sessions; Olivia Colman
- Cinematography: Ali Asad
- Edited by: Daniel Farrell
- Music by: Simon Woodgate
- Production companies: Syco Entertainment; Infinite Wisdom Studios; Vertigo Films; Roar Films
- Distributed by: Vertigo Films
- Release date: 18 July 2014
- Running time: 87 minutes
- Country: United Kingdom
- Language: English
- Budget: £2.5 million
- Box office: £2.6 million

Pudsey the Dog: The Movie, also known as Pudsey: The Movie, is a 2014 British live action family comedy film directed by Nick Moore, produced by Simon Cowell, written by Paul Rose with music by Simon Woodgate and starring Pudsey the Dog, one half of the dancing duo Ashleigh and Pudsey, voiced by David Walliams. The film, which was released in the United Kingdom on 18 July 2014 (after it was originally set to be released in December 2013), follows Pudsey and his siblings Molly, George, and Tommy as they move to the village of Chuffington-on-Sea with their mother Gail (Jessica Hynes) and set out to save the village, from their landlord Mr. Thorne (John Sessions) and his cat Faustus. Pudsey is voiced by comedian David Walliams.

Other stars include Jessica Hynes, John Sessions, Jim Tavaré and Izzy Meikle-Small. The film was made by Vertigo Films and Syco Entertainment, received negative reviews from critics, and earned £2.6 million on a £2.5 million budget.

On 10 November 2014, Pudsey the Dog: The Movie was released on DVD in the United Kingdom.

== Cast ==
- David Walliams as Pudsey (voice)
- John Sessions as Thorne
- Jessica Hynes as Gail
- Izzy Meikle-Small as Molly
- Spike White as George
- Malachy Knights as Tommy
- Luke Neal as Farmer Jack
- Luke Tittensor as Will
- Lorraine Kelly as Cat (voice)
- Dan Farrell as Ken and Finn
- Jim Tavare as The Dog Catcher
- Peter Serafinowicz as Edward the Horse (voice)
- Olivia Colman as Nelly the Horse (voice)
- Ashleigh Butler as Anabella The Cow (voice)

== Production ==
In January 2013, it was announced that Simon Cowell would produce Pudsey the Dog: The Movie.

== Soundtrack ==
- Pudsey: He's Got the Love – Performed by Echobass
- Things Are Getting Better – Performed by Echobass
- Breaking It Down – Performed by Echobass
- Tea Dance – Composed by Norman Warren
- All Music – Composed by Simon Woodgate

== Home media ==
On 10 November 2014, Pudsey the Dog: The Movie was released on DVD in the United Kingdom.

== Critical reception and box office ==
In its first week, the film grossed £446,000, finishing outside of a Top 5 led by Dawn of the Planet of the Apes with £8.7 million. This was described by the BBC as a "flop". Pudsey: The Movie was critically panned. On review aggregator website Rotten Tomatoes it holds a rare 0% approval rating with an average score of 3.3/10 based on 14 reviews.

Peter Bradshaw of The Guardian called the film "so depressingly bad that cinemas should play the adagietto from Mahler's Fifth over a loudspeaker as audiences file out grimly into the foyer afterwards, silently asking themselves if life has any value... Watching this movie, I was overwhelmed with three emotions: boredom, embarrassment and chiefly shame on behalf of everyone involved, shame that something so shoddily made and mediocre could ever have emerged from our film industry."

Writing in The Observer, Mark Kermode said "nothing can explain (or excuse) the sheer skull scraping ugliness of this relentlessly tacky Britain's Got Talent spin off... If you paid to see this, you would feel duty bound to demand your money back; I saw it for free and still wanted a refund." David Edwards of the Daily Mirror called the film a "cheap and cheerless embarrassment" with a "thin and familiar" plot and said it "deserves to be scraped from the lawn, and dropped in the bin."

In 2022, Paul Rose (the film's writer) was featured in an episode of the comedy podcast Cheapshow in which Rose said, "The film received 0% on Rotten Tomatoes and was called one of the worst films ever made. I'm quite proud of that."
