= Lowcostholidays =

Defunct travel agency in the United Kingdom

lowcostholidays
- Industry: Travel, tourism
- Founded: 2004
- Defunct: 15 July 2016
- Fate: Administration
- Headquarters: Palma de Mallorca, Spain (formerly London)
- Key people: Paul Evans, CEO
- Products: Flights, package holidays, hotels and resorts
- Number of employees: 500+
- Website: www.lowcostholidays.com

Lowcostholidays was a travel company and a consumer-facing brand of the lowcosttravelgroup, which was founded in 2004. It operated to destinations worldwide, with a focus on European city and beach breaks. Around 500 people worked for the brand, which was based in Palma de Mallorca, with additional offices located in London, and Krakow. The company collapsed and went into administration on 15 July 2016. The collapse of the company was blamed on low turnover in the aftermath of the Brexit vote.

== History ==
lowcostholidays was founded in 2004 by CEO Paul Evans, and operated in 13 different markets. Evans had a background in the travel industry, where he worked for companies including Saga Holidays, Airtours/My Travel Group, First Choice and Holiday Hotels.

lowcostholidays’ former headquarters were located in East Grinstead, before relocating to offices just outside Gatwick Airport, in summer 2011. The brand then moved its business to Palma de Mallorca, Spain, in November 2013. Following the move Evans responded to criticism, saying, “We are centralising our lowcostholidays business and simplifying our structure…having a single trading entity, through which all of our holidays are sold, means we can achieve significant efficiencies and cost savings.”

The brand’s German site was the first to launch internationally, followed by a further nine European sites.

In June 2013, lowcostholidays launched its single parent holidays campaign, offering lone parents cheaper rates on selected hotels when travelling with children. The same month, their Secret Hotels programme launched, allowing customers access to cheaper beach breaks by booking an undisclosed hotel.

In early 2014, lowcostholidays expanded further, opening offices in Atlanta, United States and Sydney.

=== Collapse ===
On 15 July 2016, the company collapsed and went into administration. The administrator, Smith & Williamson, claimed that there were approximately 27,000 Lowcostholidays customers on holiday at that date and 110,000 who had booked trips but were then yet to depart. In 2013, the CAA warned holidaymakers to avoid booking with the company, due to its relocation to Spain, which meant that its bookings were no longer protected by ATOL, which would have ensured that customers could return home and receive a refund if a company did collapse.

Lowcostholidays had ignored these warnings, stating that holidaymakers had protection under a Spanish scheme. Its sudden collapse was blamed on "the recent and ongoing turbulent financial environment" (leading up to and following the Brexit vote). The company advertised on ITV in the UK the week before, and a 60% sale on their Facebook page the day before they entered into administration.

== Awards ==
lowcostholidays was named ‘Best Tour Operator-Agent Website’ at the 2009 Travolution Awards. In 2010, the company won Travolution’s ‘Rising Brand of the Year.’ It featured in the Sunday Times Virgin Fast Track 100 League Table twice, in 2009 and 2011 and won ‘Best Optimised/Responsive Mobile Website’ at the MOMA (Marketing on Mobile Award) Awards in early 2013 . The UK site has also been nominated for ‘Best Travel Blog’ and ‘Best Use of Mobile’ in 2014’s Travolution Awards . The brand’s Irish site, lowcostholidays.ie, was voted ‘Best Online Travel Agent’ in 2013 by the Irish media.

== Marketing ==
lowcostholidays launched its first TV advert, created by MPG Media Contacts, in June 2011. A year later, a national bus campaign was launched, the messaging stating, ‘I bet you can’t guess what we do’; later replicated in a similar, ‘Does what it says on the bus’ campaign in September 2013.

In October 2012, lowcostholidays offered a free holiday to a man named Thomas Cook, after he failed to secure a break from the travel company of the same name.

When offering the free holiday, Charlotte Hunt said "if your name was 'lowcostholidays.com' we would certainly have accepted your request". In October 2012, Adam K Dean messaged the company through its website's feedback form, claiming to be "Mr Lowcostholidays" and requesting a holiday to Greece. Lawrence Hunt, non-executive chairman (originally chief operating officer), later sent an SMS to Adam K Dean accepting the request, and subsequently provided a free holiday to Kos, Greece. Jessica Whitworth, managing the "social" aspect of the free trip, later said "after a few internal discussions we have decided that the whole ‘Thomas Cook’ story is now past its expiration date and we don’t feel that publicising your holiday would be of any additional value."

In June 2013, the brand created a YouTube advertisement, consisting of UGC submitted by social fans in its Little Stars competition - the video generating over 126,000 views.

In late 2013 and early 2014, lowcostholidays partnered with BETA to produce a selection of TV adverts. that aired in the UK and Ireland. The campaign continued into 2014, with 10 second, destination focused adverts appearing in the lead up to summer.
