= Ceefax =

Teletext information service operated by the BBC

- Pages from Ceefax title card
- Country of origin: United Kingdom
- Original language: English

Production
- Production company: BBC

Original release
- Network: BBC analogue (via "Text" button); BBC One (1980–1997); BBC Two (1980–2012)
- Release: 23 September 1974 – 23 October 2012

Related
- ORACLE (1978–1992); Teletext Ltd. (1993–2010)

Ceefax (/ˈsiːfæks/) was the world's first teletext information service and a forerunner to the current BBC Red Button service. Ceefax was started by the BBC in 1974 and ended at 23:32:19 BST (11:32:19 p.m.) on 23 October 2012 after 38 years of broadcasting, in line with the digital switchover completion in Northern Ireland.

To receive a desired page of text on a teletext-capable receiver, the user entered a three-digit page number on the device. The selected page was displayed on the user's screen as it was transmitted, requiring a wait of several seconds. There were many pages to choose from, and they could be displayed either on a black background or superimposed over the broadcast programme picture. This latter feature made it technically possible for the first time for British broadcasters to transmit subtitles that could be turned on or off by the viewer, rather than as part of the broadcast image.

== History ==
=== Early electro-mechanical system ===
During the late 1960s, engineers Geoff Larkby and Barry Pyatt at the Designs Department (Television Group) of the BBC worked on an experimental analogue text transmission system, known as Beebfax. Its object was to transmit a printable page of text during the nocturnal "close-down" period of normal television transmission. Sir Hugh Carleton Greene, then Director General of the BBC, was interested in making farming and stock-market prices available as hard copy via the dormant TV transmitters. The remit received by BBC Designs Department was "the equivalent of one page of The Times newspaper to be transmitted during shut-down".

Their system employed a modified rotating-drum facsimile transmitter designed by Alexander Muirhead, and Larkby & Pyatt's own, unique, design of hard-copy printer. This printer used pressure-sensitive "till-roll" paper passing over a drum with a raised helix of steel wire.

The drum was synchronised with the transmission drum by means of the "Start of Page", and "Start of Line" information inherent in the Muirhead system. Printing was effected by a hardened steel blade driven by, initially, a loudspeaker-type moving coil, then by a printed-circuit coil, and finally by a special ceramic piezo element manufactured by Brush-Clevite. The combination of rotating helix and oscillating moving blade, with the till-roll paper moving linearly between them, enabled a raster to be drawn on the paper.

=== Fully electronic version ===
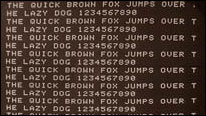
Early test data being received in 1972 – a pangram and numbers

The idea was later taken up again, this time in digital and on-screen form, under the new name of CEEFAX, meaning "see facts". The new system was announced in October 1972, and occasional test transmissions followed until early 1974, when the BBC requested government authorisation to formalise the tests. Approval was granted and on 23 September 1974 an experimental Ceefax service began with thirty pages of information; this expanded to 50 pages by early 1975 and was planned to reach a "full magazine" of 100 pages later that year.

Created in the United Kingdom in the early 1970s by the Philips Lead Designer for VDUs John Adams, his design was given to the BBC so they could start transmission. The BBC were working on ways of providing televisual subtitles for deaf people, it was the first teletext system in the world. Sir James Redmond, the BBC's Director of Engineering at the time, was a particular enthusiast.

Other broadcasters soon took up the idea, including the Independent Broadcasting Authority (IBA), who had developed the incompatible ORACLE teletext system at around the same time and had actually beaten the BBC to the world's first demonstration of live broadcast teletext, via the Crystal Palace transmitter on 9 April 1973 (the BBC had demonstrated Ceefax in 1972 but only via a non-broadcast wired connection). Before the Internet and the World Wide Web became popular, Ceefax pages were often the first location to report a breaking story or headline.

After technical negotiations, the two broadcasters settled in 1974 on a single standard, different from both Ceefax and ORACLE, which ultimately developed into World System Teletext (1976), and which remained in use for analogue broadcasts until 2012. The display format of 24 rows by 40 columns of characters was also adopted for the Prestel system.

The technology became the standard European teletext system and replaced other standards, including the Antiope system formerly used in France.

Graham Clayton was its news executive and began working for Ceefax in 1978. In an interview with The Straits Times, he said that viewers got instant results for the recent snooker championships through its computers, rather than ORACLE which had its reporter reading the scores through the telephone.

In 1983, Ceefax started to broadcast computer programs, known as telesoftware, for the BBC Micro (a home computer available in the United Kingdom). The telesoftware broadcasts stopped in 1989. A similar idea was the French C Plus Direct satellite channel which used different, higher speed technology to broadcast PC software.

The basic technology of Ceefax remained compatible with the 1976 unified rollout; system elaborations in later years were made such that earlier receivers were still able to do a basic decode of pages, but would simply ignore enhanced information rather than showing corrupted data.

=== Closure ===
Ceefax page, seen on 5 October 2008.

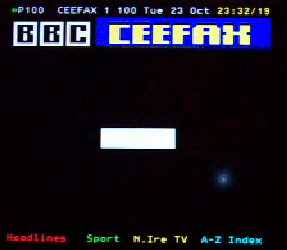
Ceefax page at the moment of switch off, seen on 23 October 2012.

Until 2012, the BBC's Ceefax service was still providing information on topics covering News, Sport, Weather, TV Listings and Businesses. The pages were kept up to date until the UK digital switchover was completed on Tuesday 23 October 2012.

In 2002, the BBC stopped broadcasting Ceefax on the digital satellite Sky Digital service, but later brought back a limited service, including a TV schedule for BBC One and BBC Two; and subtitles.

The BBC has tried to reuse the old Ceefax page numbers where possible on the Freeview and digital satellite BBC Red Button Ceefax-replacement services.

It was announced that Ceefax would not be replaced when the analogue signal was switched off in October 2012. The BBC Red Button service was seen as an alternative to Ceefax and since 2007 the number of regions with a Ceefax-supported analogue signal had declined as digital switchover progressed across the UK. As of the end of 2011, three-quarters of the UK TV regions had completed or were in the process of being switched over.

Ceefax was the last remaining text service available via analogue TV transmissions in the UK, as ITV and Channel 4's Teletext service closed in December 2009. Channel 5's "Five Text" ancillary service closed in 2011. A limited analogue teletext service through ITV and Channel 4 was still available through terrestrial until the digital switchover was completed on 23 October 2012.

At 23:32:19 BST on 23 October 2012, Ceefax was switched off after 38 years of providing news, weather and sport information when the Olympic Games champion Dame Mary Peters turned off the last analogue TV signal in Northern Ireland. A series of graphics on Ceefax's front page marked its 38 years on the BBC. BBC News' website also has memories of Ceefax.

In a tongue-in-cheek article on the 2017 general election, The Guardian gave political satirist Count Binface (then standing as Lord Buckethead) a "Best Policy" award for his manifesto pledge to bring back Ceefax.

== Technology ==
The Ceefax/ORACLE standard was internationalised in the 1980s as World System Teletext, which was adopted into the international standard CCIR 653 (now ITU-R BT.653) of 1986 as CCIR Teletext System B. As with other teletext systems, text and simple graphics are transmitted in-band with the picture signal, and decoded by controller circuitry.

== Pages and content ==
Pages were retrieved using a three-digit number. From the 1996 relaunch onwards, the main sections were organised as follows:

- 100s – News
- 200s – Business News
- 300s – Sport
- 400s – Weather and Travel (including 480 – Golf and 490 – Tennis)
- 500s – Entertainment (including 555 – National Lottery results and 570 – Newsround)
- 600s – TV and Radio Listings (including 660 – Horse Racing)
- 888 – Subtitles

== Pages from Ceefax ==
Pages from Ceefax was a selection of content from the Ceefax service and normally only shown in the absence of any other programming. It consisted of selected Ceefax pages transmitted as an ordinary TV picture, viewable on any receiver. Audio accompaniment consisted of stock music or sometimes a discontinuous tone. The limited set of rolling pages shown on Pages from Ceefax had been accessible at any time of day on teletext-equipped televisions on page 198 (BBC1) and 298 (BBC2), moving to page 196 in November 1992 and to page 152 in November 1996.

=== Content ===
Initially, the in-vision broadcasts featured a variety of different topics – news, sport, weather and BBC TV listings were always included. Other topics would be included from time to time, such as financial news, travel news, a recipe and information about the BBC. In late 1989 the Ceefax service was relaunched as a news-focused service and the in-vision sequence became a news-only service. A headline page for business and sport reappeared in 1992, as did weather and travel information.

=== In-vision history ===
In-vision Ceefax was first shown in March 1980, originally in 30-minute slots. Transmissions were originally billed on-air as Ceefax in Vision but daytime transmissions were not listed in the Radio Times until 7 January 1984, under the title of Pages from Ceefax.

On 28 February 1983, BBC1 started to air a selection of Ceefax pages every weekday morning at 6.00am called Ceefax AM which would lead into the start of Breakfast Time. It is first mentioned in the Radio Times on 21 March.

From May 1983, BBC1 began to transmit Ceefax pages during their daytime downtime periods. This continued until Friday 24 October 1986, three days before BBC1 launched a full daytime schedule, with all subsequent Ceefax transmission on BBC1 being only the weekday 6.00am Ceefax AM broadcast. Also, Ceefax pages were used for the first two years of Daytime on Two (September 1983 to June 1985) to provide listings and information about the sequence's programmes. It was announced on air as the "Daytime on Two Information Service" and was shown at various points between programmes, especially during any longer gaps.

From the late 1980s onwards, Pages from Ceefax was increasingly marginalised by the BBC's move towards a near-continuous service, although BBC2 only gradually expanded its broadcasting hours when schools programming was not being shown and by the early 1990s, Ceefax broadcasts were shown once a day, usually airing for the 15 minutes (sometimes for slightly longer) prior to the first programme of the day. When the BBC launched The Learning Zone in 1995, Ceefax was shown during overnight downtime on BBC Two for the first time, although latterly BBC News filled many of the late-night/early morning gaps in the schedules. The BBC only aired Ceefax on BBC Two on Saturday, Sunday and Monday mornings until 6am when CBeebies started as Tuesday to Friday mornings was allocated to the BBC News channel sometimes and BBC Learning Zone took 3:50am to 6am

The last nationwide Pages from Ceefax broadcast on BBC1 was on 9 November 1997. However, occasional Ceefax broadcasts continued to be shown on BBC One Scotland, BBC One Wales and BBC One Northern Ireland as a filler between the end of an opt-out and rejoining the national network. On BBC Two, Pages from Ceefax continued to be broadcast until less than two days before the Ceefax service was closed down, the final transmission being in the early hours of Monday 22 October 2012, which featured special continuity announcements and a specially created end caption featuring various Ceefax graphics from over the years. The music chosen for the final minutes was "BART" by Ruby, which had been frequently used for Pages from Ceefax and for other continuity. Since then, overnight downtime has been filled with a rolling loop of previews of forthcoming BBC Two programmes.

=== Similar services on other channels ===
Channel 4 showed pages from Oracle from 1983 until 1989 and 4-Tel On View from 1983 until 1997, and in the late 1980s and early 1990s, some ITV companies broadcast Jobfinder, which consisted of Teletext pages showing job vacancies and related information. ITV Nightscreen also used Teletext pages in its first few years on air. In its early days, Sky One showed in-vision pages from the Sky Text service during its overnight downtime.

== Teefax ==
Teefax is a revamped version of Ceefax for the Raspberry Pi computer introduced in August 2016 by Peter Kwan. To view Teefax, enthusiasts connect a Raspberry Pi running appropriate software to the signal input of a Teletext-capable TV. Kwan said: "It's like the modern-day equivalent of restoring steam engines. It's completely useless but it keeps us occupied." The service has 12 pages of up-to-date news and Kwan hopes to create an online archive of old teletext pages from Britain, Germany and France.

== See also ==
- Timeline of teletext in the UK
- Timeline of in vision teletext broadcasts in the UK
- Prestel – British videotex service
