= Park Avenue (teletext soap) =

Daily teletext based soap opera

- Genre: Soap opera
- Created by: Robbie Burns
- Country of origin: United Kingdom
- Original language: English
- No. of episodes: 1,445

Original release
- Network: ORACLE teletext: ITV p126 (1988–1991); Channel 4 p566 (1991–1992)
- Release: 1 December 1988 – 31 December 1992

Park Avenue is a daily teletext based soap opera on ITV's ORACLE teletext service, which was written by Robbie Burns. It was launched in 1988, and 1,445 episodes were written during its time on air. It later moved to Channel 4 after ORACLE was reorganised, before ending when the service lost its franchise at the end of 1992.

== History ==
The series was launched on Page 126 of ORACLE on ITV on Thursday 1 December 1988, with a new episode appearing at 5:00pm each afternoon (including weekends). Park Avenue was set in the fictional town of Parkfield (which was somewhere near London, although the exact location was never given), and told the stories of the everyday lives of the residents of Park Avenue. Each episode would usually have six to ten pages of text, while Page 126 itself would also feature a synopsis of recent storylines enabling readers who'd missed an episode to catch up, occasional character profiles and even teletext-graphics produced pictures of how the author imagined the characters would look. Robbie Burns would often try to involve the characters in topical events of the day – for example one character decided to stop buying beef following the 1990 BSE scare, while another found himself caught up in a riot at a local prison during a time when a riot at Manchester's Strangeways Prison had inspired a number of copycat riots in jails across England, Wales and Scotland.

ORACLE also encouraged some reader involvement with the soap. Readers would sometimes be invited to vote by phone to decide on story outcomes, and there was at least one competition asking readers to suggest ideas for new characters and stories for Park Avenue. Viewers were also able to purchase printouts of episodes, with seven episodes typically costing £2.

The series moved to Channel 4 after ORACLE re-organised some of its pages in 1991. It could then be found on Page 566 and became a six- rather than a seven-day soap, with episodes from Mondays to Saturdays. It remained on Channel 4 until the service's franchise ended on 31 December 1992. The last episode of Park Avenue to appear on Channel 4 did so on 30 December.

In 1995, Park Avenue was repeated by Paramount Comedy Channel's own teletext service PText. The first four days was run then on 11 December they switched to episode 376. They did this in order that 11 December in the soap would also be 11 December for the viewers. In all PText showed 700 episodes of Park Avenue.

== Legacy ==
To the present day Park Avenue remains the only soap of its kind in the United Kingdom. In the early 2000s, ORACLE's successor, Teletext Ltd briefly ran a feature called Diary of An Odd Couple about Terry and Helena, a plumber and an It girl, who begin dating after Helena calls Terry in to do some work at her flat, but this only ran for a short while.

For a while, many episodes appeared on the website of Paramount Comedy Channel's teletext service.
