= Teletext Ltd. =

British provider of teletext and digital interactive services

Teletext
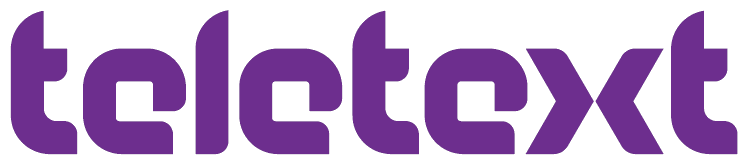
- Predecessor: Oracle (1978–1992)
- Founded: 1 January 1993
- Defunct: 21 June 2010
- Headquarters: London, United Kingdom

Teletext Ltd was the provider of teletext and digital interactive services for ITV, Channel 4 and Channel 5 in the United Kingdom.

== Origins ==
Teletext Ltd started providing teletext services for ITV and Channel 4 on 1 January 1993, replacing the previous ORACLE service which had lost the franchise.

== Ownership ==
The company was owned by A&N Media, the consumer division of Daily Mail and General Trust's Associated Northcliffe Digital. Its main source of income was from the UK travel website Teletext Holidays. The Chairman of Teletext Ltd was Chris Letcher who acquired a stake in Teletext Holidays from parent company A&N Media.

From 1 December 2013, Teletext Holidays moved from advertising holidays from 14 holiday suppliers (including Qwerty Travel, Lowcost Travel Group and Hays Travel) to working with one supplier, Truly Travel.

== Closure ==
Teletext Cars closed on 2 February 2007.

On 21 January 2009, Ofcom reported that "The increasing availability of text based services, both broadcast and online may mean that post 2014 there is no longer clear justification for continued intervention to maintain a public service teletext licence."

On 16 July 2009, DMGT announced that due to competition from the Internet, current economic conditions and Ofcom's findings, the service would cease broadcasting most of its services on analogue and digital television, with the exception of the commercial services broadcast on Freeview channels 101-107 such as Teletext Holidays and the firm's profitable travel websites in January 2010, with the switch off date subsequently brought forward to 14 December 2009 (Sky Digital) and 15 December 2009 (analogue TV, Freesat and Freeview).

Teletext's news and information service were removed from: ITV, Channel 4 and Five on analogue TV; ITV and Channel 4 on Sky Digital; ITV, Channel 4 and channel 100 on Freeview; editorial on Teletext Extra on Freeview; editorial on ch 986 on Freesat. The GameCentral section continued online on the Teletext website before joining another DMGT website Metro, renamed Metro Gaming.

Despite the withdrawal of news and information content, the service continued to broadcast. On 29 January 2010, the broadcasting regulator Ofcom revoked Teletext's licence to broadcast. On 27 May 2010, Ofcom imposed a financial penalty of £225,000 on Teletext Limited for ceasing to provide part of its service whilst its licence was still extant. Ofcom regulations state: "Public service broadcasting licences are offered for a fixed term, requiring the holder to provide the licensed service throughout the licence period. In accepting a licence, the broadcaster takes account of the likely cost of the obligations under the licence, and the value of the benefits associated with the licence, for the duration of the licence period." Teletext's licence was for the licence period 2004 to 2014.

The main Teletext service on Freeview was removed from channel 100 on the EPG on 21 June 2010. Teletext Holidays went digital in January 2011. In a deal between BBC Worldwide and Inview Technology Ltd, Teletext Extra was relaunched as Radio Times Extra on 31 January 2011, with editorial content from the Radio Times instead of Teletext Ltd.

Teletext formally closed down on 28 June 2012, but Teletext Holidays finally closed on 1 October 2012.

== Other teletext services ==
In spite of its name, the "Teletext"-branded service was neither the first nor the only teletext service in the UK. The BBC (one of the original developers of teletext) launched its Ceefax teletext service in 1974, the same year that Teletext's predecessor, ORACLE, also appeared. Although ORACLE closed at the end of 1992 (when Teletext Ltd outbid it for the franchise), Ceefax continued to run on BBC analogue channels until the cessation of analogue signals in October 2012.

FourText, originally called 4-Tel, was first run in conjunction with ORACLE, as an auxiliary teletext provider for Channel 4 from 1982. 4-Tel occupied pages 410–469 within ORACLE's page space. When ORACLE lost its licence and was replaced by Teletext Ltd in 1993, 4-Tel moved to its own page space on pages 300–399 (effectively its own magazine). Channel 4 enlisted Intelfax to run the service. In 2002, 4-Tel was renamed FourText. In addition, FourText also launched on digital television. In 2003, Channel 4 ended their contract with Intelfax and contracted out the service to Teletext Ltd. The new service was named Teletext on 4 and operated on pages 400–499 (which replaced pages 300-399 as Channel 4's page space). However, on 30 October 2008, Teletext on 4 on Channel 104 closed and replaced in December 2008 by 1-2-1 Dating. using Teletext on 4's old channel number.

== See also ==
- Teletext – the system
- List of teletext services
- Teletext Holidays
- Ceefax
- ITV (TV network)
- Channel 4
- Timeline of teletext in the UK
- Bamboozle, a teletext multiple choice quiz game on Channel 4
- Digitiser, the service's initial videogames section
- GameCentral, the service's later videogames section
- Teletext on 4, Channel 4's text service run by Teletext Ltd
- Planet Sound

ITV national franchise
Preceded by ORACLE	Teletext service 1 January 1993 – 29 January 2010	Licence revoked
