= Sky Text =

British teletext service, 1985–2013

Sky Text was the digital teletext service operated by British Sky Broadcasting (BSkyB) in the United Kingdom and Ireland. It was available on Freeview Channel 206 and Sky. The text service ceased on 30 October 2013 and skyinteractive.com, skytext.sky.com are no longer accessible.

== History ==
It was originally launched by Sky Channel in 1985.

In 1995, Sky Text was briefly renamed as Fastext. The Fastext brand was retained in the header row of the service even after the renaming to Sky Text.

A digital teletext counterpart with the same name launched on 11 December 2000 on Sky Digital. It was initially only available in the sports channels and was also accessible to non-subscribers of such channels. The new service launched with 1200 pages and used the WAP protocol which also enabled users to access other compatible websites.

The teletext counterpart, along with its channel specific variations, ended its services in June 2001 along with Sky's shutdown of its analogue satellite broadcasts. The "one-version" service continued on Sky Digital until October 2001. Meanwhile, the service continued on cable, with its only contents being horse racing information and advertisements for bookmakers.

The digital text counterpart was relaunched in August 2002 with a new navigation system while its teletext counterpart lost its graphics and reduced the number of advertisements.

=== Sky Text on Freeview ===
In December 2004, Sky Text was launched on Freeview. On 19 September 2012, Sky Text moved from 108 to 206. On 30 October 2013, Sky Text ceased broadcasting on Freeview Channel 206. On 3 December 2013. Sky Text was removed from the EPG on channel 206.

== Features ==
- News Page 102
- Finance Page 114
- Sport Page 200
  - Sport Letters Page 459
- Weather Page 151
- Showbiz Page 170
- National Lottery results Page 216
- Holidays Page 301
- Program TV Page 550
  - Program TV Now and Next Page 554
- Lifestyle- Program TV- Program on Cinema Page 600
- Now TV App Page 525
