= ORACLE (teletext) =

British teletext system

- First air date: 9 April 1973
- Availability: United Kingdom
- Area: United Kingdom
- Owner: ITV
- Dissolved: 31 December 1992
- Replaced by: Teletext Ltd.

ORACLE (from "Optional Reception of Announcements by Coded Line Electronics") was a commercial teletext service first broadcast on the ITV network in 1975 and later additionally on Channel 4 and S4C in the United Kingdom from 1982. The service ceased on both channels at 23:59 UTC on 31 December 1992, when it was replaced by Teletext Ltd.

== History ==
A typical ORACLE page, here showing news from ITN.

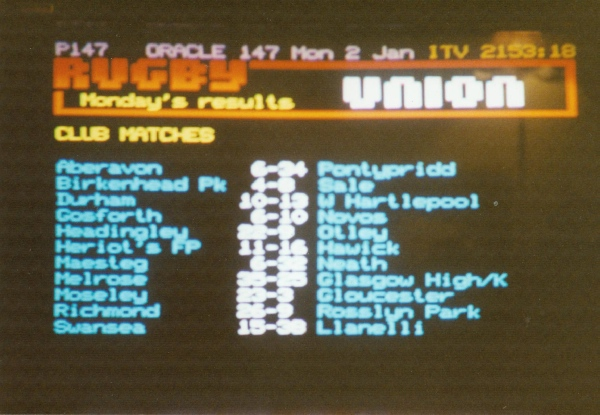
Teletext New Year's Day 1989

The last television listings on ORACLE on its closing day. Note the 00:00 listing titled "THE END OF ORACLE: NOW THE NIGHTMARE BEGINS!", seemingly a jab against Teletext, their successors. A sweepstake to win a Super Nintendo Entertainment System is also shown.

It was developed by the Independent Broadcasting Authority's engineering division. The first demonstration of broadcast teletext anywhere in the world was a 50-page test version of ORACLE to an invited audience, from the IBA's Crystal Palace transmitter on 9 April 1973.

Despite beating the BBC to an actual broadcast demonstration (the BBC had demonstrated Ceefax in 1972 but only via a wired connection between decoder and computer), ORACLE's experimental broadcast service did not begin until 30 June 1975, while Ceefax began on 23 September 1974 following occasional test broadcasts in 1973–74 using dummy pages.

Although it is frequently cited that ORACLE "launched" in 1978, it was regularly broadcast from 1975 and neither it nor Ceefax ever received a formal public launch. Both began as low-key experimental services and grew slowly. There was never an official public declaration that either service had actually "launched", and both were still being described in media reports as being "experimental" as late as August 1977, although eventually the word "experimental" was dropped from reports relating to them.

ITV Oracle made the world's first telesoftware broadcast in February 1977 and this led to a working demonstration of telesoftware at the 1978 International Broadcasting Convention.

From October 1977 to April 1978, an industrial dispute led to ORACLE being blacked out nationally. From 1975 until 1977, ORACLE had operated for 12.5 hours a day Monday to Friday. A planned extension of its operating hours to cover the weekend prompted engineering staff at LWT, the national origination point for ORACLE, to request more money for the additional duties; this was refused, leading to the staff refusing to maintain the equipment during the week. A test page was broadcast instead.

ORACLE was launched as a new advertising medium on 1 September 1981 with 180,000 teletext sets in the country. By the following year, there were then 450,000 sets in the UK and that number was projected to rise to nearly three million at the end of 1985 and confident predictions of advertising revenues as high as $90 million (£50 million).

ORACLE moved away from being an experimental engineering department and more towards being a content provider. Under the original plans for the ITV franchise renewal, they were to have been scrapped at the end of 1992 and the few scan lines they used given to the highest bidder. ORACLE successfully campaigned for the creation of a franchise for the teletext service on ITV and Channel 4, only to find themselves outbid by Teletext Ltd., a consortium originally comprising Associated Newspapers, Koninklijke Philips Electronics N.V., and Media Ventures International, who started broadcasting at midnight on New Year's Day 1993.

== In-vision broadcasts ==
From early 1983 until its demise on 31 December 1992, ORACLE pages were broadcast in vision during downtime, mostly on Channel 4, although pages were shown during the night from 1986, with some regions showing pages nightly and others only airing them for a brief period in 1987.

=== Channel 4 ===
==== 4-Tel on View ====
Shown between 1983 and January 1997, 4-Tel on View was a magazine featuring previews of the day's Channel 4's programmes as well as back-up information and other features, such as the adventures of a dog called 4-T, from Channel 4's own "4-Tel" teletext service. The transmissions were especially notable from 1986 when animated graphics were introduced. Although the service was transmitted alongside Oracle on Channel 4, 4-Tel was editorially and legally separate, and operated for Channel 4 by Intelfax Ltd.

From 1983 until the start of Channel 4's breakfast television service in April 1989, the 4-Tel magazine ran for 15 minutes and was repeated several times each day with transmissions airing at increasingly early times of the day as Channel 4 expanded its broadcast hours. Following the start of breakfast television, however, 4-Tel on View was shown in a single block, initially 40 minutes in length, before the start of programmes. After ORACLE lost its franchise on 31 December 1992, 4-Tel on View continued to be shown and from 1 January 1993 until Channel 4 started 24-hour broadcasting in January 1997, 4-Tel on View was generally shown throughout Channel 4's entire closedown period.

==== Oracle on View ====
Between 1983 and 1989, Channel 4 broadcast pages from the ORACLE service on air. Shown in 15-minute bursts, and alternating with 4-Tel on View and showings of the ETP-1 testcard, the pages were seen during the day when Channel 4 was not broadcasting actual programmes. Initially, the pages shown were from one aspect of the ORACLE service with the subject matter changing every so often. but from September 1987, Oracle on View became a news service, adopting this format at the same time that Channel 4 expanded its broadcast hours to accommodate the transfer of ITV Schools to Channel 4. Oracle on View ended on 31 March 1989, three days before Channel 4 started broadcasting breakfast television.

=== ITV ===
==== Jobfinder ====
Between the late 1980s and mid 1990s, many ITV companies broadcast job vacancies and related information during overnight periods and the service was provided by broadcasting the relevant ORACLE page in-vision. Central was the first company to do this, beginning in April 1986 with Yorkshire following in January 1987. Initially, the pages were broadcast for an hour after the end of regular programming but from April 1987, Central broadcast Jobfinder throughout their overnight downtime with Tyne Tees doing the same from November 1987. By late 1988, all of ITV was broadcasting a 24-hour service and many other companies, including Granada, HTV and TSW, introduced their own Jobfinder service at this point, broadcasting the pages between 4am and 5am, later 4:30am to 5:30am. By the late 1990s, the vacancies were no longer transmitted in a teletext format and by the mid-2000s all of the Jobfinder services had ended, with Yorkshire being the last region to end its Jobfinder programme.

==== Daybreak ====
For a short period in 1987, prior to the start of 24-hour broadcasting on ITV, a selection of teletext pages were broadcast in-vision prior to the start of TV-am. These pages mostly consisted of news and information about TV-am.

== The end ==
The end of the disappearance process of the ORACLE teletext service at 23:56:04 GMT on 31 December 1992, where in the middle, only the text 'ORACLE gone 1978-1992' appears together with a white square in the centre.

ORACLE began to disappear at 23:31:09 on 31 December 1992, with the outer border of pixels turning black: this process continued until 23:55:55 when only a white square was left, with the text "ORACLE gone; 1978–1992", separated by the square. It was then replaced by the service from Teletext Ltd. ORACLE did not carry television listings beyond its midnight closing time on New Year's Eve 1992. By 00:06:38 GMT, Teletext was fully operational.

== See also ==
- Park Avenue, a teletext based soap which appeared on ORACLE for several years written by Robbie Burns and Steve Regan
- Timeline of teletext in the UK
- Timeline of in vision teletext broadcasts in the UK

ITV national franchise
New service	Teletext service 1978 – 31 December 1992	Succeeded by Teletext Ltd.
